= List of United States federal courthouses in Oregon =

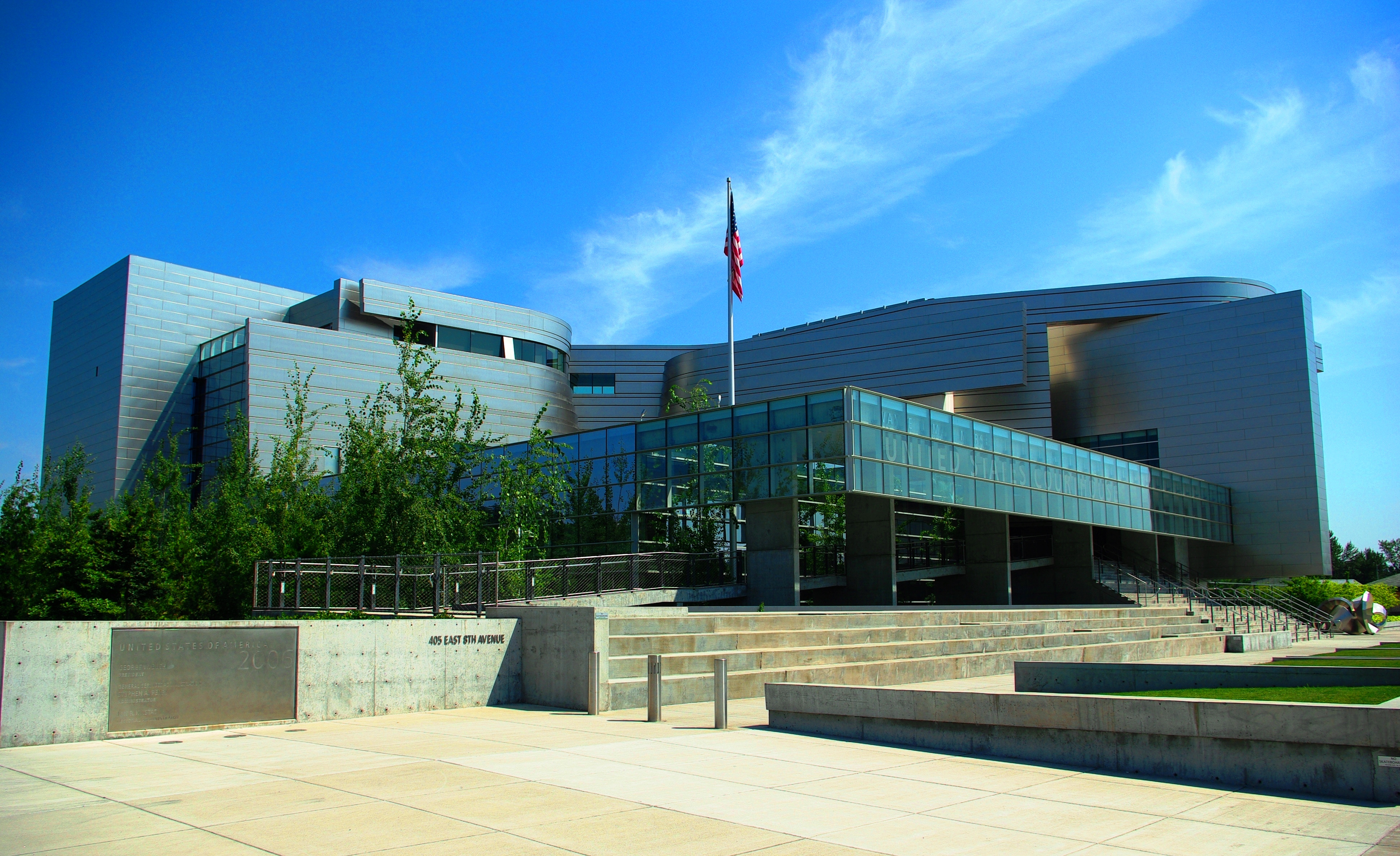
Oregon's newest federal courthouse, the Wayne L. Morse United States Courthouse in Eugene

Following is a list of current and former courthouses of the United States federal court system located in Oregon. Each entry indicates the name of the building along with an image, if available, its location and the jurisdiction it covers, the dates during which it was used for each such jurisdiction, and, if applicable the person for whom it was named, and the date of renaming. Dates of use will not necessarily correspond with the dates of construction or demolition of a building, as pre-existing structures may be adapted or court use, and former court buildings may later be put to other uses. Also, the official name of the building may be changed at some point after its use as a federal court building has been initiated.

== Courthouses ==
Courthouse	City	Image	Street address	Jurisdiction	Dates of use	Named for
Federal Building and United States Courthouse	Eugene		211 East 7th Avenue	D. Ore.	1975–?	n/a
Wayne L. Morse U.S. Courthouse	Eugene		405 East 8th Avenue	D. Ore. 9th Cir.	2006–present	U.S. Senator Wayne Morse
James A. Redden Federal Courthouse^{†}	Medford		310 West Sixth Street	D. Ore.	1916–present	District Court judge James A. Redden (1996)
John F. Kilkenny U.S. Post Office and Courthouse^{†}	Pendleton		104 Southwest Dorion	D. Ore.	1916–present	Court of Appeals judge John Kilkenny
Gus J. Solomon U.S. Courthouse^{†}	Portland		Main Street & 6th Avenue SW	D. Ore.	1933–1997	District Court judge Gus J. Solomon
Pioneer Courthouse^{††}	Portland		555 Southwest Yamhill Street	D. Ore. 9th Cir.	1875–1933; 1973–present	American pioneers to the Northwest Territory (1969)
Mark O. Hatfield U.S. Courthouse	Portland		1000 Southwest Third Avenue	D. Ore.	1997–present	U.S. Senator Mark Hatfield

== Key ==
^{†}	Listed on the National Register of Historic Places (NRHP)
^{††}	NRHP-listed and also designated as a National Historic Landmark
