= List of first minority male lawyers and judges in Oregon =

This is a list of the first minority male lawyer(s) and judge(s) in Oregon. It includes the year in which the men were admitted to practice law (in parentheses). Also included are men who achieved other distinctions such becoming the first in their state to graduate from law school or become a political figure.

== Firsts in state history ==
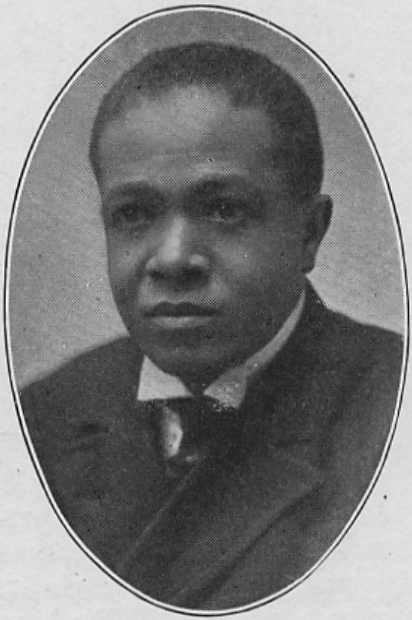
McCants Stewart: First African American male lawyer in Oregon (1903)

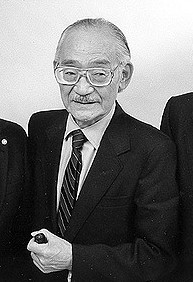
Minoru Yasui: First Japanese American male lawyer in Oregon (c. 1939)

=== Lawyers ===
- First Native American (Clatsop) male: Silas B. Smith (1876)
- First African American male: McCants Stewart (1903)
- First known Chinese American male: Seid Beck Jr. (1907)
- First Japanese American male: Minoru Yasui (c. 1939)
- First Native American male (Nez Perce Tribe): Douglas Roger Nash (1975)
- First undocumented male: Thomas Kim in 2018

=== State judges ===
- First African American male: Aaron Brown Jr. (1959) in 1969
- First Latino American male: Joseph Ceniceros (1968)
- First Japanese American male: Roy Hirai in 1975
- First openly gay male: David Gernant in 1994
- First Asian American male (district circuit court): Michael S. Loy in 1995
- First openly gay male (Oregon Supreme Court): Rives Kistler (1981) in 2003
- First Hispanic American male (Chief Justice; Oregon Supreme Court): Paul De Muniz (1975) in 2006
- First Filipino American male (Oregon Court of Appeals): Steven Powers in 2017
- First Indonesian American male: Roger DeHoog in 2022
- First Vietnamese American male: Thanh H. Tran in 2023

=== Federal judges ===
- First Jewish American male (United States District Court for the District of Oregon): Gus J. Solomon in 1949
- First African American male (U.S. District Court for the District of Oregon): Ancer L. Haggerty (1973) in 1994
- First openly gay male (U.S. District Court for the District of Oregon): Michael J. McShane (1988) in 2013
- First Hispanic American male (magistrate judge; United States District Court for the District of Oregon): John Acosta in 2008
- First Hispanic American male (United States District Court for the District of Oregon): Marco A. Hernández in 2009
- First Muslim American male (magistrate judge and judge; United States District Court for the District of Oregon): Mustafa T. Kasubhai in 2018 and 2024 respectively

=== Assistant Attorney General ===
- First African American male: H.J. Belton Hamilton in 1954

=== District Attorney ===
- First Hispanic American male: John Haroldson in 2008

=== Political Office ===
- First Taiwanese American male (U.S. House of Representatives): David Wu (1982) in 1999

=== Oregon State Bar Association ===
- First Confederated Tribes of the Umatilla Indian Reservation male (admitted): William D. Johnson (1975)
- First openly gay male (president): Mark Johnson Roberts in 1998
- First Hispanic American male (president): Angel Lopez in 2002

== Firsts in local history ==
- Eddie Yoon (1976): Reputed to be the first Korean American male lawyer in the Pacific Northwest
- Raymond Dean Crutchley (1999): First African American male judge in Eastern Oregon (2018)
- John Haroldson: First Hispanic American male to serve as a District Attorney for Benton County, Oregon (2008)
- Thanh H. Tran: First Vietnamese American male to serve as a Judge of the Clackamas County Circuit Court, Oregon (2023)
- Robert Johnson: First African American male judge in Douglas County, Oregon (2022)
- Seid Beck Jr.: First Chinese American male to graduate from the University of Oregon School of Law (1907)
- Derrick Bell: First African American male to serve as the Dean of the University of Oregon School of Law (1981)
- Mustafa T. Kasubhai: First South East Asian male judge in Lane County, Oregon (2007)

== See also ==
- List of first minority male lawyers and judges in the United States

== Other topics of interest ==
- List of first women lawyers and judges in the United States
- List of first women lawyers and judges in Oregon
