= Ralph James Mooney =

American legal scholar

- Born: Eugene, Oregon, United States
- Education: University of Michigan
- Occupations: Law professor, writer

Ralph James Mooney is an American legal scholar. He is the Wallace and Ellen Kaapcke Professor emeritus of Business Law at the University of Oregon School of Law. His specialty is American legal history and contract law.

== Early life ==
Mooney as born in Eugene, Oregon. He received his B.A. from Harvard University (1965) and his J.D. from the University of Michigan Law School (Order of the Coif, 1968).

== Career ==
He joined the University of Oregon School of Law faculty in 1972, after working with the San Francisco law firm of Howard, Prim, Rice, Nemerovski, Canady & Pollak, specializing in commercial litigation

After moving to an academic career, he gained international attention with his article "The New Conceptualism in Contract Law." The article, according to Carl Bjerre, Hollis Professor of Law at the University of Oregon "forthrightly condemns and carefully documents the broad resurgence of a style of judicial reasoning that, throughout a range of issues in contract law, exalts wooden logic at the expense of factual and interpretive nuances, all with 'profoundly conservative political implications.'"

Mooney is also a leading authority on 19th-century Oregon legal history. His major work in progress is a biography of Matthew Deady, Oregon's first federal district judge, some of which has already been published.

He spent two sabbaticals teaching at Victoria University of Wellington, New Zealand and the University of New South Wales in Sydney, Australia. He has also made two extended trips to Ukraine and one to Georgia to teach about American contract and commercial law.

== Selected work ==
- (1974) "The Rise and Fall of Classical Contract Law: A Response to Professor Gilmore." Oregon Law Review 55 (155).
- (1984) "Matthew Deady and the Federal Judicial Response to Racism in the Early West." Oregon Law Review 63 (561).
- (1988) "Formalism and Fairness: Matthew Deady and Federal Public Land Law in the Early West." Washington Law Review 63 (317).
- (1991) "An American View of New Zealand Contract Law." Victoria University of Wellington Law Review 21 (69).
- (1995) "The New Conceptualism in Contract Law". Oregon Law Review 74 (1131).
- (2000) "Hands Across the Water: The Continuing Convergence of American and Australian Contract Law." University of New South Wales Law Journal 23 (1).
- (2005) "A Friendly Letter to the Oregon Supreme Court: Let’s Try Again on the Parol Evidence Rule." Oregon Law Review 84 (369).

== Awards ==
- (1976) University of Oregon School of Law Teacher of the Year
- (1990) Burlington Northern Foundation Award for Teaching Excellence
- (1999) Orlando John Hollis Faculty Teaching Award
