= Judge Hogan =

Judge Hogan may refer to:

- Michael Robert Hogan (born 1946), judge of the United States District Court for the District of Oregon
- Thomas F. Hogan (born 1938), judge of the United States District Court for the District of Columbia
- Timothy Sylvester Hogan (judge) (1909–1989), judge of the United States District Court for the Southern District of Ohio
