= Alfred Goodwin =

American judge (1923–2022)

Senior Judge of the United States Court of Appeals for the Ninth Circuit
- In office January 31, 1991 – December 27, 2022

Chief Judge of the United States Court of Appeals for the Ninth Circuit
- In office June 15, 1988 – January 31, 1991
- Preceded by: James R. Browning
- Succeeded by: J. Clifford Wallace

Judge of the United States Court of Appeals for the Ninth Circuit
- In office November 30, 1971 – January 31, 1991
- Appointed by: Richard Nixon
- Preceded by: John Kilkenny
- Succeeded by: Andrew Kleinfeld

Judge of the United States District Court for the District of Oregon
- In office December 11, 1969 – December 17, 1971
- Appointed by: Richard Nixon
- Preceded by: John Kilkenny
- Succeeded by: Otto Richard Skopil Jr.

72nd Justice of the Oregon Supreme Court
- In office March 8, 1960 – December 19, 1969
- Appointed by: Mark Hatfield
- Preceded by: Hall S. Lusk
- Succeeded by: Thomas Tongue

Personal details
- Born: Alfred Theodore Goodwin; June 29, 1923 Bellingham, Washington, U.S.
- Died: December 27, 2022 (aged 99) Happy Valley, Oregon, U.S.
- Education: University of Oregon (BA, JD)

Military service
- Allegiance: United States
- Branch/service: United States Army
- Years of service: 1943–1946 (Army); 1960–1969 (Reserve)
- Rank: Captain (Army); Lieutenant colonel (Army Reserve)
- Unit: United States Army Reserve, Judge Advocate General's Corps
- Battles/wars: World War II

Alfred Theodore Goodwin (June 29, 1923 – December 27, 2022) was an American jurist who was a United States circuit judge of the United States Court of Appeals for the Ninth Circuit and also a district judge of the United States District Court for the District of Oregon. Goodwin wrote the majority opinion for the Ninth Circuit in the famous pledge of allegiance case that was decided by the United States Supreme Court as Elk Grove Unified School District v. Newdow. Goodwin found that the recitation of the Pledge with the words "under God" violated the Establishment Clause, but the Supreme Court reversed his ruling. Goodwin famously wrote, "A profession that we are a nation 'under God' is identical, for Establishment Clause purposes, to a profession that we are a nation 'under Jesus,' a nation 'under Vishnu,' a nation 'under Zeus,' or a nation 'under no god,' because none of these professions can be neutral with respect to religion."

== Education and career ==
Born on June 29, 1923, in Bellingham, Washington, Goodwin received a Bachelor of Arts degree in 1947 from the University of Oregon and a Juris Doctor in 1951 from the University of Oregon School of Law. While in college, he served as a captain in the United States Army during World War II. Goodwin worked as an attorney for five years in Eugene, Oregon. He then served in the Oregon state courts, first on the Circuit Court (1955–1960), and then on the Supreme Court of Oregon (1960–1969). Goodwin was appointed March 18, 1960, by Oregon Governor Mark Hatfield to replace the outgoing Hall S. Lusk, who was then appointed to the United States Senate, a position Hatfield would later be elected to in 1966. Meanwhile, Goodwin was then elected to a full six-year term later in 1960 and won re-election in 1966 before resigning from the Oregon Supreme Court December 19, 1969, to take a federal judicial position.

== Federal judicial service ==
Goodwin was nominated to a seat on the United States District Court for the District of Oregon by President Richard Nixon on September 22, 1969, to a seat vacated by Judge John Kilkenny. He was confirmed by the United States Senate on December 10, 1969, and received his commission on December 11, 1969. His service terminated on December 17, 1971, due to his elevation to the Ninth Circuit.

Goodwin was nominated to the United States Court of Appeals for the Ninth Circuit by President Nixon, on November 3, 1971, to a seat vacated by Judge John Kilkenny. He was confirmed by the Senate on November 23, 1971, and received his commission on November 30, 1971. Chief Judge James R. Browning stepped down early while Goodwin remained eligible to succeed him as Chief Judge, and Goodwin served in that position from June 15, 1988, until he assumed senior status on January 31, 1991.

== Notable cases ==
Goodwin wrote the majority opinion for the Ninth Circuit in the famous Pledge of Allegiance case that was then decided by the United States Supreme Court as Elk Grove Unified School District v. Newdow. He also is well known for penning the opinion in White v. Samsung, a landmark right of publicity/appropriation case in California in which the host of Wheel of Fortune, Vanna White, successfully sued Samsung for airing a commercial featuring a robot dressed in her likeness and turning letters on a mock Wheel of Fortune board. See White v. Samsung Elecs. Am., 971 F.2d 1395 (9th Cir. 1992).

== Personal life and death ==
Goodwin died on December 27, 2022, at the age of 99. At the time of his death, Goodwin was the oldest federal judge still hearing cases, and the longest-serving current federal judge.

== See also ==
- List of United States federal judges by longevity of service

Legal offices
Preceded by Hall S. Lusk	Associate Justice of the Oregon Supreme Court; 1960–1969	Succeeded by Thomas Tongue
Preceded by John Kilkenny	Judge of the United States District Court for the District of Oregon; 1969–1971	Succeeded by Otto Richard Skopil Jr.
Preceded by John Kilkenny	Judge of the United States Court of Appeals for the Ninth Circuit; 1971–1991	Succeeded by Andrew Kleinfeld
Preceded by James R. Browning	Chief Judge of the United States Court of Appeals for the Ninth Circuit; 1988–1991	Succeeded by J. Clifford Wallace
