= Ancer L. Haggerty =

American judge (born 1944)

Ancer Lee Haggerty
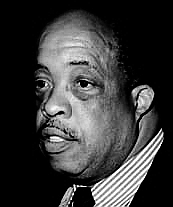

Senior Judge of the United States District Court for the District of Oregon
- Incumbent
- Assumed office August 26, 2009

Chief Judge of the United States District Court for the District of Oregon
- In office 2002 – January 31, 2009
- Preceded by: Michael Robert Hogan
- Succeeded by: Ann Aiken

Judge of the United States District Court for the District of Oregon
- In office March 28, 1994 – August 26, 2009
- Appointed by: Bill Clinton
- Preceded by: Owen M. Panner
- Succeeded by: Michael H. Simon

Personal details
- Born: Ancer Lee Haggerty; August 26, 1944 (age 81) Vanport, Oregon, U.S.
- Education: University of Oregon (BS); University of California College of the Law, San Francisco (JD)

Military service
- Allegiance: United States of America
- Branch/service: United States Marine Corps
- Years of service: 1967–1970
- Unit: 3rd Marine Division
- Battles/wars: Vietnam War
- Awards: Silver Star

Ancer Lee Haggerty (born August 26, 1944) is an inactive senior United States district judge of the United States District Court for the District of Oregon. At the time of his nomination to the federal bench by President Clinton in 1993, he was serving as an Oregon circuit court judge.

== Early life and education ==
Haggerty was born in Vanport, Oregon. He graduated from the University of Oregon with a Bachelor of Science degree in 1967, and after service in the United States Marine Corps from 1967 to 1970, entered University of California College of the Law, San Francisco, earning a Juris Doctor in 1973.

== Career ==
Haggerty was a law clerk for the metropolitan public defender in Portland, Oregon in 1973. He was a staff attorney of Metropolitan Public Defender in Portland from 1973 to 1977. He was in private practice of law in Portland from 1977 to 1988. He was a judge to the Multnomah County District Court, Oregon from 1989 to 1990. He was a judge to the Multnomah County Circuit Court, Oregon from 1990 to 1993.

=== Federal judicial service ===
Haggerty was nominated by President Bill Clinton on November 19, 1993, to serve as a United States district judge of the United States District Court for the District of Oregon. He was nominated to a seat vacated by Judge Owen M. Panner. He was confirmed by the United States Senate on March 25, 1994, and received commission on March 28, 1994. He served as chief judge from 2002 to 2009. He took senior status on August 26, 2009, and took inactive senior status at the end of 2014, meaning that he remains a member of the court, but no longer hears cases or participates in court business.

=== Notable case ===
Haggerty was the presiding judge in the trial of White Aryan Resistance (WAR) founder and leader, Tom Metzger, over his involvement in the 1988 murder of Mulugeta Seraw by skinhead members of Portland's East Side White Pride.

== See also ==
- List of African-American federal judges
- List of African-American jurists
- List of first minority male lawyers and judges in Oregon

Legal offices
Preceded by Owen M. Panner	Judge of the United States District Court for the District of Oregon; 1994–2009	Succeeded by Michael H. Simon
Preceded by Michael Robert Hogan	Chief Judge of the United States District Court for the District of Oregon; 2002–2009	Succeeded by Ann Aiken
