= United States District Court for the District of Oregon =

United States federal district court of Oregon (U.S. state)

Coordinates: 45.51580°N 122.67624°W

- (D. Ore.)
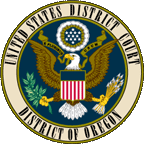
- Location: Mark O. Hatfield U.S. Courthouse (Portland) More locations: Wayne Lyman Morse U.S. Courthouse (Eugene); James A. Redden Federal Courthouse (Medford); John F. Kilkenny U.S. Post Office and Courthouse (Pendleton)
- Appeals to: Ninth Circuit
- Established: March 3, 1859
- Judges: 6
- Chief Judge: Michael J. McShane

Officers of the court
- U.S. Attorney: Scott E. Bradford
- U.S. Marshal: Russel Burger
- www.ord.uscourts.gov

The United States District Court for the District of Oregon (in case citations, D. Ore. or D. Or.) is the federal district court whose jurisdiction comprises the state of Oregon. It was created in 1859 when the state was admitted to the Union. Appellate jurisdiction belongs to the United States Court of Appeals for the Ninth Circuit (except for patent claims and claims against the U.S. government under the Tucker Act, which are appealed to the Federal Circuit). Matthew P. Deady served as its first judge.

The United States Attorney's Office for the District of Oregon represents the United States in civil and criminal litigation in the court. As of July 29, 2025, the United States attorney is Scott E. Bradford.

== Organization ==
Map of the United States District Court for the District of Oregon.: Portland Division; Pendleton Division; Eugene Division; Medford Division

The District of Oregon has four divisional offices within the state: Portland, Eugene, Medford, and Pendleton. Among them, the Portland, Eugene, and Medford Divisions are all staffed. The Pendleton Division is not staffed and in-person filings must be made in the Portland Division. The Portland Division holds court at the Mark O. Hatfield United States Courthouse and handles cases from Clackamas, Clatsop, Columbia, Hood River, Jefferson, Multnomah, Polk, Tillamook, Wasco, Washington, and Yamhill Counties. The Medford Division meets at the James A. Redden United States Courthouse and handles cases from Curry, Jackson, Josephine, Klamath and Lake Counties. The Pendleton Division holds session at John F. Kilkenny United States Post Office and Courthouse and covers cases from Baker, Crook, Gilliam, Grant, Harney, Malheur, Morrow, Sherman, Umatilla, Union, Wallowa and Wheeler Counties. The Wayne L. Morse United States Courthouse houses the Eugene Division that handles cases from Benton, Coos, Deschutes, Douglas, Lane, Lincoln, Linn, and Marion Counties.

== History ==
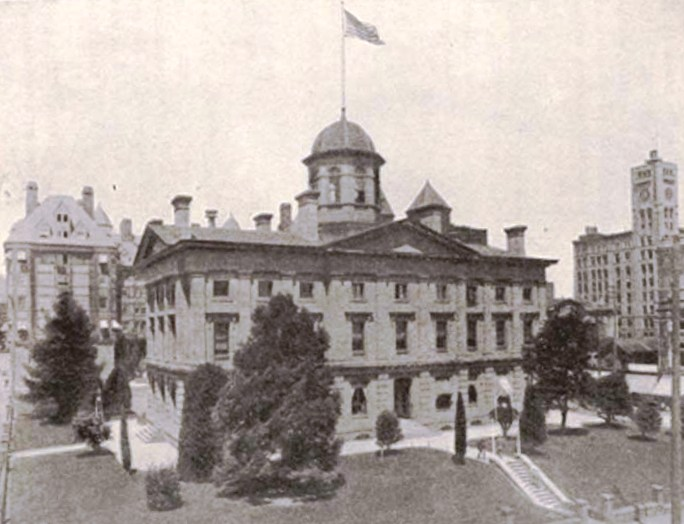
The District of Oregon met in the U.S. Custom House and Post Office of Portland until 1933.

After Oregon became a state on February 14, 1859, the United States Congress created the District of Oregon encompassing the entire state on March 3, 1859. The bill creating the district authorized a single judge and also designated it as a judicial circuit. President James Buchanan appointed Matthew Deady as judge, and the court was to hold annual sessions in April and September at the seat of government in Salem. Deady held the first session of the court on September 12, 1859, in Salem, but was able to have the court relocated to Portland by the September session of 1860. Beginning in 1933, the court was housed in the United States Courthouse (now Gus J. Solomon United States Courthouse) before moving to the new Hatfield Courthouse in 1997.

On March 3, 1863, Congress passed a law that removed the circuit court jurisdiction and transferred appeals court jurisdiction to the Tenth Circuit, and in 1866 transferred it again to the Ninth Circuit. On April 18, 1877, court clerk Ralph Wilcox committed suicide in his office at the court using a Deringer pistol. On March 27, 1885, Judge Deady admitted Mary Leonard to the federal bar, the first woman admitted in Oregon. In 1909, Congress added another seat to the court, followed by another judgeship in 1949. On October 20, 1978, Congress passed a law authorizing two more positions on the bench of the Oregon district court. The first woman to serve on the court was Helen J. Frye, whose service began on February 20, 1980. In 1990, Congress added a sixth judgeship for the district. Ancer L. Haggerty, the first African American on the court, began his service on March 28, 1994.

== Current judges ==
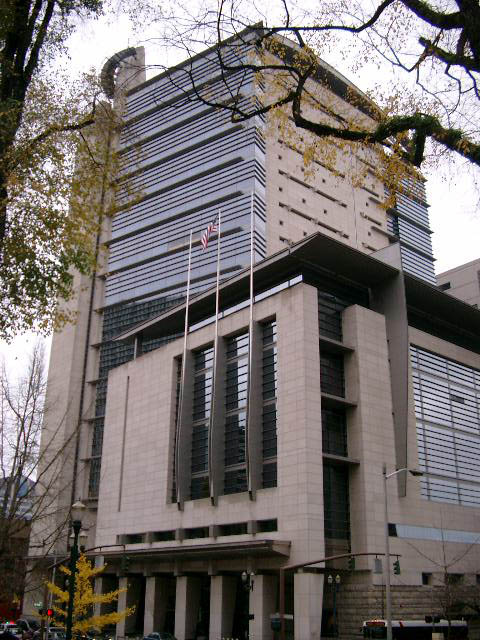
The Mark O. Hatfield United States Courthouse in Portland.

As of March 29, 2025:

#	Title	Judge	Duty station	Born	Term of service			Appointed by
#	Title	Judge	Duty station	Born	Active	Chief	Senior	Appointed by
29	Chief Judge	Michael J. McShane	Eugene	1961	2013–present	2024–present	—	Obama
28	District Judge	Michael H. Simon	Portland	1956	2011–present	—	—	Obama
30	District Judge	Karin Immergut	Portland	1960	2019–present	—	—	Trump
31	District Judge	Adrienne Nelson	Portland	1967	2023–present	—	—	Biden
32	District Judge	Amy M. Baggio	Portland	1973	2024–present	—	—	Biden
33	District Judge	Mustafa T. Kasubhai	Eugene	1970	2024–present	—	—	Biden
22	Senior Judge	Ancer L. Haggerty	inactive	1944	1994–2009	2002–2009	2009–present	Clinton
23	Senior Judge	Ann Aiken	Eugene	1951	1998–2023	2009–2016	2023–present	Clinton
25	Senior Judge	Anna J. Brown	Portland	1952	1999–2017	—	2017–present	Clinton
26	Senior Judge	Michael W. Mosman	Portland	1956	2003–2021	2016–2019	2021–present	G.W. Bush
27	Senior Judge	Marco A. Hernandez	Portland	1957	2011–2024	2019–2024	2024–present	Obama

== Former judges ==
#	Judge	Born–died	Active service	Chief Judge	Senior status	Appointed by	Reason for termination
1	Matthew Deady	1824–1893	1859–1893	—	—	Buchanan	death
2	Charles B. Bellinger	1839–1905	1893–1905	—	—	Cleveland	death
3	Charles E. Wolverton	1851–1926	1905–1926 (Note: Recess appointment; formally nominated on December 5, 1905, confirmed by the United States Senate on January 10, 1906, and received commission the same day.)	—	—	T. Roosevelt	death
4	Robert S. Bean	1854–1931	1909–1931	—	—	Taft	death
5	John Hugh McNary	1867–1936	1927–1936	—	—	Coolidge	death
6	James Alger Fee	1888–1959	1931–1954 (Note: Recess appointment; formally nominated on December 15, 1931, confirmed by the Senate on December 22, 1931, and received commission on December 23, 1931.)	1948–1954	—	Hoover	elevation
7	Claude C. McColloch	1888–1959	1937–1958	1954–1958	1958–1959	F. Roosevelt	death
8	Gus J. Solomon	1906–1987	1949–1971 (Note: Recess appointment; formally nominated on January 5, 1950, confirmed by the Senate on June 27, 1950, and received commission on July 5, 1950.)	1958–1971	1971–1987	Truman	death
9	William G. East	1908–1985	1955–1967	—	1967–1985	Eisenhower	death
10	John Kilkenny	1901–1995	1959–1969	—	—	Eisenhower	elevation
11	Robert C. Belloni	1919–1999	1967–1984	1971–1976	1984–1999	L. Johnson	death
12	Alfred Goodwin	1923–2022	1969–1971	—	—	Nixon	elevation
13	Otto Richard Skopil Jr.	1919–2012	1972–1979	1976–1979	—	Nixon	elevation
14	James M. Burns	1924–2001	1972–1989	1979–1984	1989–2001	Nixon	death
15	Helen J. Frye	1930–2011	1980–1995	—	1995–2011	Carter	death
16	Owen M. Panner	1924–2018	1980–1992	1984–1990	1992–2018	Carter	death
17	James A. Redden	1929–2020	1980–1995	1990–1995	1995–2020	Carter	death
18	Edward Leavy	1929–2023	1984–1987	—	—	Reagan	elevation
19	Malcolm F. Marsh	1928–2025	1987–1998	—	1998–2025	Reagan	death
20	Robert E. Jones	1927–2025	1990–2000	—	2000–2025	G.H.W. Bush	death
21	Michael Robert Hogan	1946–2025	1991–2011	1995–2002	2011–2012	G.H.W. Bush	retirement
24	Garr King	1936–2019	1998–2009	—	2009–2019	Clinton	death

== Chief judges ==
Chief Judge
Fee	1948–1954
McColloch	1954–1958
Solomon	1958–1971
Belloni	1971–1976
Skopil, Jr.	1976–1979
Burns	1979–1984
Panner	1984–1990
Redden, Jr.	1990–1995
Hogan	1995–2002
Haggerty	2002–2009
Aiken	2009–2016
Mosman	2016–2019
Hernandez	2019–2024
McShane	2024-present

Chief judges have administrative responsibilities with respect to their district court. Unlike the Supreme Court, where one justice is specifically nominated to be chief, the office of chief judge rotates among the district court judges. To be chief, a judge must have been in active service on the court for at least one year, be under the age of 65, and have not previously served as chief judge.

A vacancy is filled by the judge highest in seniority among the group of qualified judges. The chief judge serves for a term of seven years, or until age 70, whichever occurs first. The age restrictions are waived if no members of the court would otherwise be qualified for the position.

When the office was created in 1948, the chief judge was the longest-serving judge who had not elected to retire, on what has since 1958 been known as senior status, or declined to serve as chief judge. After August 6, 1959, judges could not become or remain chief after turning 70 years old. The current rules have been in operation since October 1, 1982.

== Succession of seats ==
Seat 1
Seat established on March 3, 1859 by 11 Stat. 437
Deady	1859–1893
Bellinger	1893–1905
Wolverton	1905–1926
McNary	1927–1936
McColloch	1937–1959
Kilkenny	1959–1969
Goodwin	1969–1971
Skopil, Jr.	1972–1979
Panner	1980–1992
Haggerty	1994–2009
Simon	2011–present

Seat 2
Seat established on March 2, 1909 by 35 Stat. 686
Bean	1909–1931
Fee	1931–1954
East	1955–1967
Belloni	1967–1984
Leavy	1984–1987
Marsh	1987–1998
Brown	1999–2017
Immergut	2019–present

Seat 3
Seat established on August 3, 1949 by 63 Stat. 493
Solomon	1949–1971
Burns	1972–1989
Jones	1990–2000
Mosman	2003–2021
Nelson	2023–present

Seat 4
Seat established on October 20, 1978 by 92 Stat. 1629
Redden, Jr.	1980–1995
Aiken	1998–2023
Kasubhai	2024–present

Seat 5
Seat established on October 20, 1978 by 92 Stat. 1629
Frye	1980–1995
King	1998–2009
Hernandez	2011–2024
Baggio	2024–present

Seat 6
Seat established on December 1, 1990 by 104 Stat. 5089
Hogan	1991–2011
McShane	2013–present

== See also ==
- Courts of Oregon
- List of current United States district judges
- List of Oregon District Court judges
- List of United States federal courthouses in Oregon
