= Mary Leonard =

American attorney

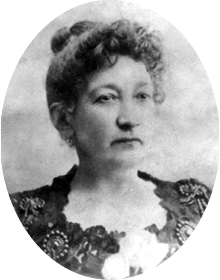
- Born: circa 1845; Alsace, France
- Died: October 24, 1912; Portland, Oregon
- Occupation: Lawyer
- Spouse: Daniel Leonard

Mary Leonard (c. 1845–October 24, 1912) was an American attorney and accused murderer in the state of Oregon. A native of France, she was acquitted for the murder of her husband that many believed she had committed. After her trial, she studied law and became the first female lawyer admitted to the bar in the Washington Territory and in the state of Oregon.

== Early years ==
Marie Gysin was born around 1845 in Alsace, France. Her parents, Johannes Gysin and Elisabeth Grieder, were Swiss immigrants to France and worked in a silk mill. Marie was their second oldest child. Several years later the family returned to Switzerland and the canton of Basel. Marie immigrated around 1870 to the United States and became Mary Gisan. Some stories say she moved in order to provide income for her poor family, others recount that she was attempting to make it on her own.

She moved to Portland, Oregon by the 1870 census and was likely working as a maid for the R. R. Riley family. In 1873, her younger sister Rosa immigrated to America and moved to Portland in 1874. Mary would then begin working as a seamstress until she married Daniel Leonard in late May 1875.

== Marriage, divorce, murder ==
Daniel Leonard owned a hotel and ferry in the Columbia River Gorge along the Oregon Trail. The hotel was east of Wasco, Oregon, at the point where the Oregon Trail crossed the John Day River. Daniel was 57, but he claimed 50 at the time of marriage while Mary claimed to be 30 when they were married at the St. Charles Hotel in Portland with the Reverend John Gantenbein presiding on May 18, 1875. In the Fall of 1877, Daniel filed for divorce, claiming Mary was having an affair with one of the boarders at the hotel, Nathaniel Lindsay.

In December 1877, the divorce went to trial. Daniel was represented by Colonel Nathaniel H. Gates who was also the mayor of The Dalles, Oregon. In the divorce, Mary claimed Daniel physically abused her, that she worked all the time at the hotel until she became ill, and that Daniel had promised her much money after they were married. Daniel said Mary was the abuser, denied him sexual relations, that she stole money and the deeds to his property, and the affair with Lindsay among other charges. At the end of the month, the court ordered Daniel to provide for Mary's maintenance, but he refused.

In late December Mary wrote a scathing letter to Daniel warning him to follow the court's instructions to provide maintenance and threatened to get even with him. On January 4, 1878, Daniel Leonard was shot in the head with a small-caliber gun, but there were no witnesses. Daniel lived until January 16, 1878, but did not identify who shot him, though his lawyer N. H. Gates blamed Mary. Meanwhile, Mary was arrested on assault and attempted murder charges for the shooting on January 5.

Mary remained in jail, but was taken out for walks accompanied by the sheriff. On June 26, 1878, Mary and Lindsay were indicted by a grand jury for the murder of Daniel Leonard. Lindsay was charged with counseling, inciting, and abetting murder, and spent 11 months in jail. In July, the trial was postponed on request of district attorney L. B. Ison. While the trial was pending, women's right activist Abigail Scott Duniway used her newspaper, The New Northwest, to support Mary's defense.

On November 18, 1878, Mary Leonard went to trial represented by William Lair Hill. He was able to get separate trials for Mary and Lindsay, and after a three-day trial won an acquittal for Mary on November 20. With the acquittal, the state dropped the charges against Lindsay. At the time, many believed that she was in fact guilty of killing Daniel, but as he was disliked, people felt sympathy for her. Later that year Mary collected Daniel's estate as the sole heir and moved to Portland where she went into business as the owner of boardinghouses.

== Lawyer ==
Some records indicate Leonard began studying law in Portland in the early 1880s. In 1883, Washington Territory passed a law to establish women's suffrage. Leonard moved that year to Seattle where she began reading law under the guidance of J. C. Haines at the offices of Struve, Haines, and McMicken. In October 1884, she passed the bar and was then admitted to practice in the Washington courts on March 11, 1885. Leonard thus became the first woman lawyer in the history of Washington, though she returned to Portland before practicing law in that then-territory.

On March 18 the Oregon Supreme Court refused to admit her to Oregon's bar, though the court previously admitted lawyers who had passed the bars of other states. The court ruled in its decision that Oregon's law only allowed for men to be admitted to the bar, and that the legislature needed to change the law. On March 27, federal judge Matthew Deady of the United States District Court for the District of Oregon admitted Leonard to the federal bar in Oregon.

In November, the Oregon Legislative Assembly passed a law supported by Leonard and sponsored by J. M. Siglin that altered existing law to allow for women to be admitted to the bar. Governor Zenas Ferry Moody signed the bill into law on November 20. On April 13, 1886, the Oregon Supreme Court admitted her to the state bar as Oregon's first female lawyer, though they attempted to keep her out via a one-year residency requirement. She successfully argued that the requirement had never been enforced, and the court relented.

== Later years ==
Mary Leonard developed a law practice in Portland with a reputation for poor writing but good courtroom skills. She worked mainly with clients that were charged in the police courts and demanded others to call her Judge Mary A. Leonard. She was not very financially successful as an attorney and opened a boardinghouse to supplement her legal income. She also developed a reputation for fighting and for drinking with male attorneys.

In 1897, she was arrested for threatening to kill the landlord of her boardinghouse. After a trial described as a circus, she was acquitted of the charges, but did admit on the witness stand that she carried a small gun and a hammer. The next year, she became involved in a lawsuit as counsel for Annie Branson. During the ongoing case, Leonard was arrested for assault, suborning perjury, and embezzlement. She was convicted for the embezzlement of $1.40 relating to refusing to pay a witness in the Branson case, but did not pay the $18 fine and was sent to jail. She was released after a short time on a writ of habeas corpus drawn up by other attorneys, as the minimum fine for the charge was $25.

Leonard continued to practice law in Portland until June 1912. However, her reputation as an attorney declined. Mary Leonard died at the Multnomah County Hospital on October 24, 1912, of heart disease. Her remains were donated to the University of Oregon Medical School (now part of Oregon Health & Science University), but records of where the body was buried were destroyed in a fire. The Oregon Women Lawyers’ chapter in Marion County is named in her honor.

== See also ==
- List of first women lawyers and judges in Oregon
