= Claude C. McColloch =

American judge

Claude Charles McColloch

Senior Judge of the United States District Court for the District of Oregon
- In office December 31, 1958 – September 30, 1959

Chief Judge of the United States District Court for the District of Oregon
- In office 1954–1958
- Preceded by: James Alger Fee
- Succeeded by: Gus J. Solomon

Judge of the United States District Court for the District of Oregon
- In office August 20, 1937 – December 31, 1958
- Appointed by: Franklin D. Roosevelt
- Preceded by: John Hugh McNary
- Succeeded by: John Kilkenny

Personal details
- Born: Claude Charles McColloch; January 14, 1888 Red Bluff, California
- Died: September 30, 1959 (aged 71)
- Party: Democratic
- Education: University of Chicago Law School (Ph.B.)

Claude Charles McColloch (January 14, 1888 – September 30, 1959) was a member of the Oregon State Senate and later a United States district judge of the United States District Court for the District of Oregon.

== Education and career ==
McColloch was born in Red Bluff, California, to Mary Elizabeth McColloch (née Wooddy) and her husband Charles Henry McColloch on January 14, 1888. When McColloch was two years old, the family relocated to Oregon, where he received his education through high school in Portland. McColloch entered Stanford University in Palo Alto, California, in 1904 and attended until 1907, when he left for the University of Chicago Law School. He graduated from law school in 1909, with a Bachelor of Philosophy degree and was admitted to the Oregon bar in May of that year. Returning to Oregon, he began private legal practice in Eastern Oregon in Baker City. McColloch remained in Baker until 1913, and served in the Oregon State Senate after winning election to a four-year term in 1910. A Democrat, he represented Baker County. In 1913, he returned to Portland where he remained in private practice until 1926. While in Portland, he served on the Port of Portland commission from 1922 to 1924. In 1926, McColloch moved to Southern Oregon where he set up private practice in Klamath Falls. He remained in that city until 1937, and served as chairman of Oregon's Democratic Party in 1936.

== Federal judicial service ==
On August 5, 1937, President Franklin D. Roosevelt nominated McColloch for a position on the United States District Court for the District of Oregon to replace the deceased Judge John Hugh McNary. McColloch was confirmed by the United States Senate on August 17, 1937, and joined the Portland-based court on August 20, 1937, after receiving his commission. He served as Chief Judge from 1954 to 1958. He took senior status on December 31, 1958. McColloch died on September 30, 1959.

Legal offices
Preceded by John Hugh McNary	Judge of the United States District Court for the District of Oregon; 1937–1958	Succeeded by John Kilkenny
Preceded by James Alger Fee	Chief Judge of the United States District Court for the District of Oregon; 1954–1958	Succeeded by Gus J. Solomon
