= James A. Redden Federal Courthouse =

- U.S. Post Office and Courthouse
- U.S. National Register of Historic Places
- U.S. Historic district – Contributing property
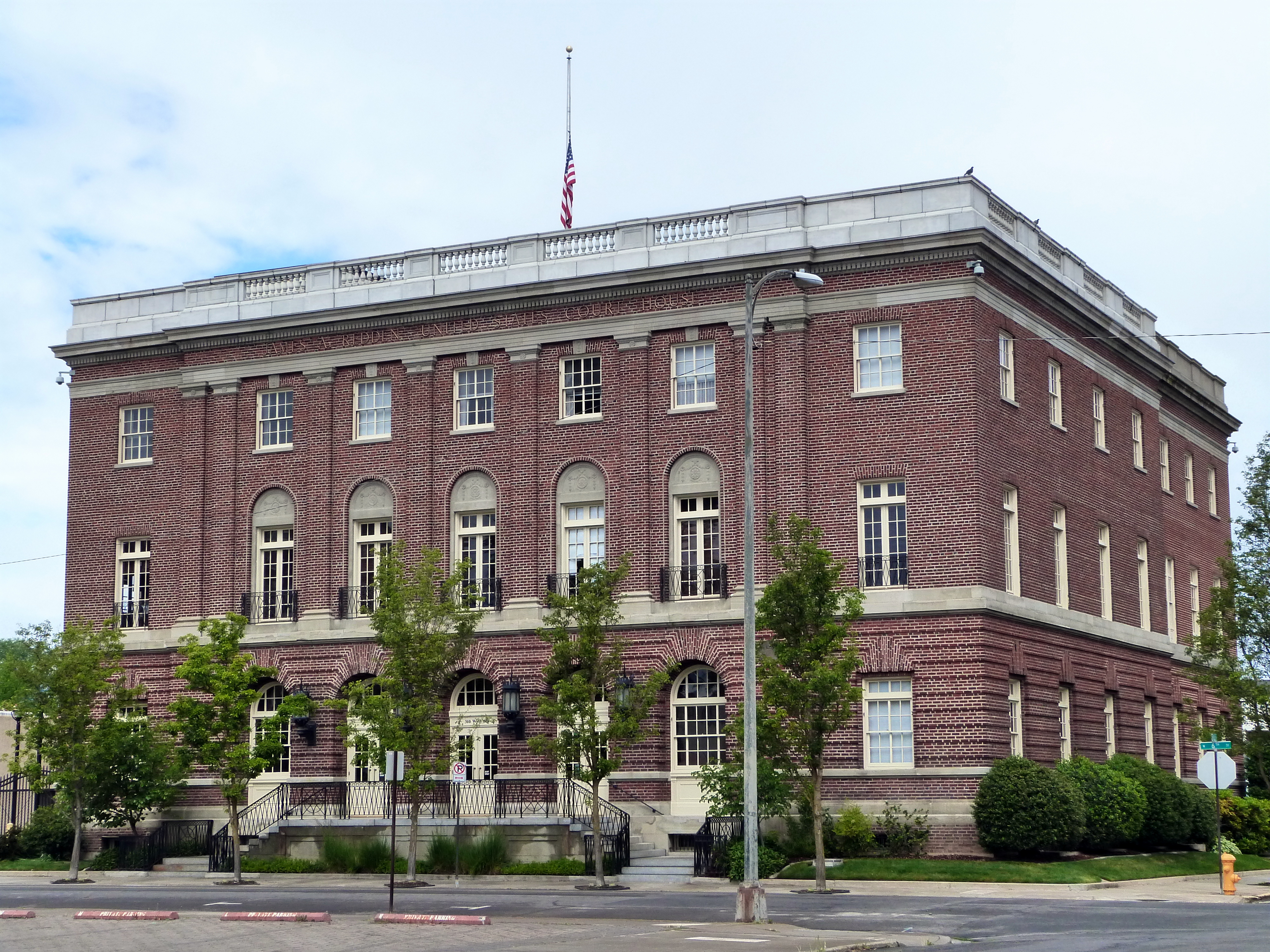
- James A. Redden Federal Courthouse

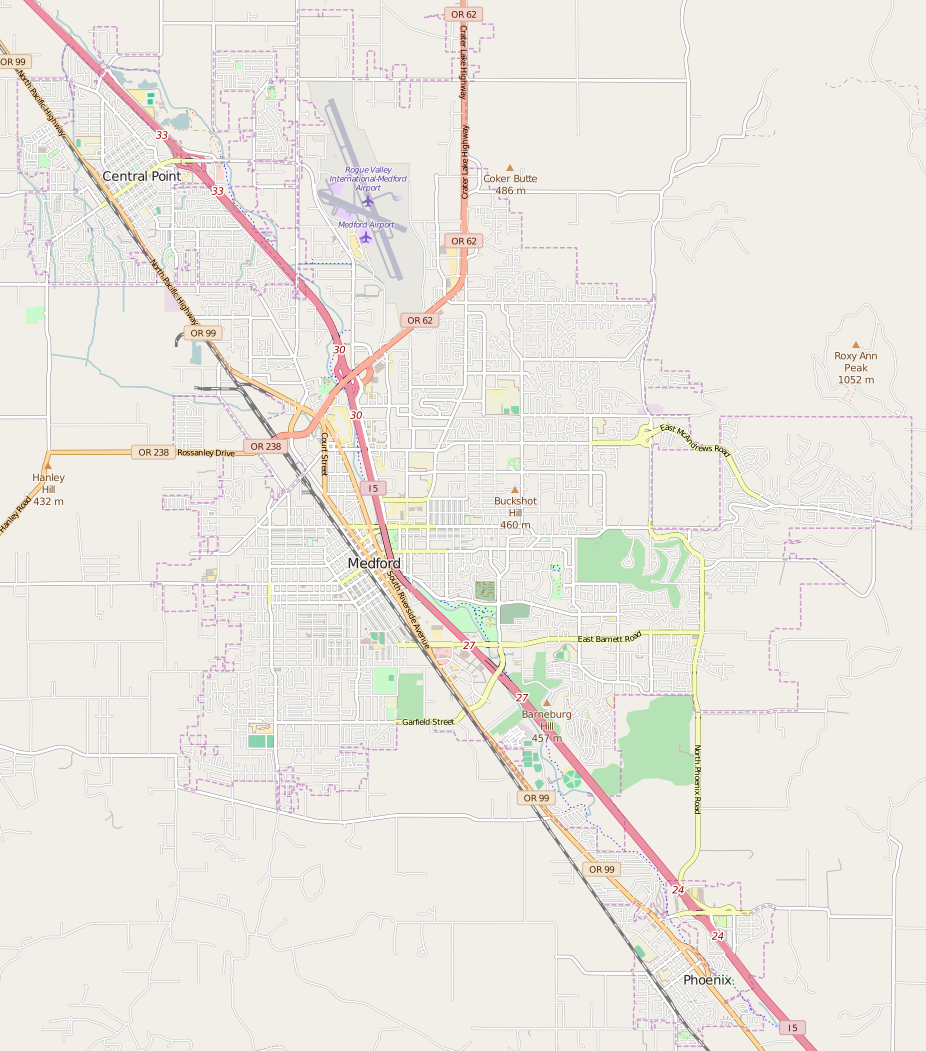
- Location within Medford OR Location within Oregon
- Location: 310 W. 6th Street; Medford, Oregon
- Coordinates: 42°19′32″N 122°52′38″W
- Area: 17,500 square feet (1,630 m^{2})
- Built: 1915–1916
- Architect: Oscar Wenderoth
- Architectural style: Georgian Revival, Second Renaissance Revival
- Part of: Medford Downtown Historic District (ID98000949)
- NRHP reference No.: 79002073
- Added to NRHP: April 30, 1979

The James A. Redden Federal Courthouse, formerly the United States Post Office and Courthouse, is a federal courthouse located in Medford, Oregon, United States. Completed in 1916 under the supervision of architect Oscar Wenderoth, it houses the United States District Court for the District of Oregon. A substantial extension was completed in 1940, under the supervision of architect, Louis A. Simon. In September 1996, the United States Senate enacted a bill introduced by Oregon Senator Mark Hatfield to rename the building for long-serving District Court judge James A. Redden. In 2025 the building was listed for accelerated disposition (sale) by the federal government, having 29,834 square feet of rentable space.

== Significance ==
The building is the earliest remaining federal courthouse in southern Oregon, and an early embodiment of the federal government in that region. The building, which was designed in the office of Oscar Wenderoth - Supervising Architect, U.S. Treasury, was constructed from 1915 to 1916. An identical building was constructed in Pendleton, Oregon, at the same time. Mr. Wenderoth was appointed to his position in 1912 and was responsible for planning many government buildings, especially post offices, before his retirement in 1929. The Medford Federal Building - U.S. Courthouse was designed with many elements of the Georgian Revival style including symmetry, rectangular plan with only minor protrusions, small window panes, arched topped windows (divided as a fan light), classically detailed cornice and balustrade, and red brick exterior. There are also elements of the Second Renaissance Revival style, such as the rusticated first story (performed in brick), a raised first floor with stone base, the lack of front door ornamentation, second level door height casement windows, and wrought iron window ornamentation. These elements give the overall composition a sense of larger scale that is more befitting a federal building. The Oregon State Historic Preservation Office classifies the building as American Renaissance Revival.

The courthouse played an important role in the development and growth of Medford. In the early 1880s the Oregon and California Railroad, which was setting tracks south from Portland, began making surveys in southern Oregon. By the fall of 1883 trains were running into Grants Pass. Jacksonville, the county seat and the most important town in this portion of the state, was naturally supposed to be the next station on the railroad. The railroad asked Jacksonville for a $25,000 bonus (reportedly to compensate for the difficulties in passing over the Applegate Ridge of mountains), but the city refused. The Oregon and California railroad subsequently rerouted the railroad through the center of the Rogue River Valley where it proceeded to start a new town. Medford was named after the hometown of the railroad engineer, David Loring of Medford, Massachusetts. Land for the town site and railroad purposes was donated to the Railroad by local landowners, C.C. Beekman, C. Mingus, C.W. Brobeck and Ira J. Phipps, and on December 20, 1883, the town was founded. Due to the rail stop in the center of the rich agricultural/orchard producing Rogue River Valley, the town grew rapidly and by 1890 Medford housed 1,791 residents. (The 1990 population of Medford was 49,900, while Jacksonville was 2,005). By 1910, the monthly postal receipts had increased from the initial $2–$3 to over $2,000. On October 2, 1910, the Medford Daily Tribune reported that "No better criterion of city's growth can be named than its postal receipts." That same year congress had appropriated $110,000 for a new U.S. Post Office and Courthouse. The building was to replace the previous temporary postal facilities (three prior locations) and to provide a U.S. District Court presence in a high-quality, non-combustible structure. City residents were so enthused by the prospect of the new structure that many offered potential sites. The chosen lot at the corner of Sixth and Holly, only three blocks from the railroad depot, was chosen. The land, which was donated by Bert and May Anderson and W.C. and Flossie Green, was formally dedicated on March 13, 1911 with a payment of $1.

In 1939, the Federal Works Agency, with Louis A. Simon as Supervising Architect and W.G. Noll as Chief Architect, designed a major addition on the north side of the building, and significant interior remodelling for a cost of $230,000. The project provided additional public and workroom facilities for the Post Office at the first floor, consolidated court operations on the second floor, and provided general office space at the third floor. The design included a two-story light-well which retained natural light for the courtroom and (by skylight) the interior of the postal workroom.

In 1966, the post office moved to new facilities two blocks south. Since that time, the building has been utilized for court operations and general office space. Medford has recently adopted a comprehensive plan that encourages downtown development. There has been substantial effort to enhance existing buildings and locate new city, county and federal facilities in the core area, which is bordered at the north by the Medford Federal Building - U.S. Courthouse. In addition to being a governmental center for southern Oregon, Medford is also a center for commerce. The population and tourism of the Rogue River Valley, including historic towns of Jacksonville and Ashland, are growing rapidly. The Medford Federal Building - U.S. Courthouse stands as a functioning symbol of prewar pride and optimism.

== Architecture ==
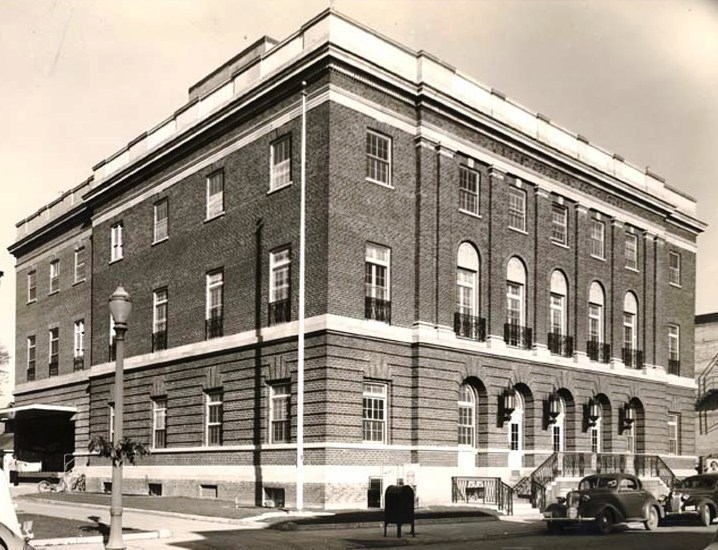
The courthouse as it appeared shortly after its construction.

The courthouse is an example of Renaissance Revival architecture. Its exterior is primarily brick and granite.

=== Site ===
The nearly level, undeveloped site was selected from among several offered as donations from the local citizens, in part due to its location a short distance from the railroad station to the east. The site is now located at the north end of Medford's government and business district. The Medford Federal Building - U.S. Courthouse is located on a lot measuring 140.2 feet by 125.25 feet at the northwest corner of West Sixth Street and North Holly Street. A setback of approximately twenty feet from the two streets (south and east sides) allowed for wide sidewalks with maple street trees, and grass next to the building. The north portion of the site was originally used for mail loading and had a hitching rail for the general public, while the west portion had an access drive. Both were constructed with macadam paving and had concrete curbs. The remaining portions of the site were landscaped with planting beds and seeded grass areas separated by concrete curbing. From the surrounding concrete sidewalks the building was elevated four to five feet to the first floor level. The primary entrance on the center of the south facade was approached via a light-colored raised granite platform which led to the ceremonial granite entry steps, all designed in the classical manner.

=== Exterior ===
The facades of the building were designed with elements of both the Georgian Revival, and Second Renaissance Revival styles which were popular at the beginning of the twentieth century. The front (south side) has the most interesting mix of elements. The symmetrical elevation is organized around five central bays which are defined by single Doric style pilasters at the interior bays and paired pilasters at the ends. The central portion is then flanked on each end by narrow bays that are only slightly recessed. The two-story pilasters rise from a buff-colored sandstone belt course at the second-floor line. The pilasters support a sandstone string course, cornice, and parapet. Originally the parapet had a balustrade in portions aligning with the five bays. The first story, which is detailed in red brick and follows the organization above, is elevated and defined by a sandstone water table course. (Note: This is an interesting design that combines a Renaissance style rustication, which was normally performed in stone, with the red brick of the Georgian Revival style). There are arched openings in the rusticated brick at the five central bays. A voussoir (in the rusticated brick) is detailed at each of these first story openings by individually cut radiating bricks. There originally were paired entry doors with an arched light above at the center three openings. Each of the outer two openings were at one time filled with a three-piece arched top wood casement windows. Each of these were later converted back to doors matching the center pair. At the five central arch openings on the second story, there are Renaissance style wood and glass paired doors with operable transoms. The doors are enclosed with black, wrought iron balcony railings. The arch of the opening is treated as a tympanum and has a bas-relief garlanded sandstone ornament. The third story openings are simplified, rectangular, and have paired casement windows. All of the doors and windows featured multiple light configurations. Four large, ornamental iron, wall mounted fixtures light the entry.

Essentially rectangular, the well-proportioned original building measured 90.0 feet wide by 57.5 feet deep in plan. The original treatment on the two identical end elevations is restrained compared to the front. The horizontal string courses, brick rustication, cornice and parapet detailing continues, but the pilasters and arched openings are omitted in favor of four evenly spaced rectangular openings in a flat wall, (the end walls of the 1939 addition are recessed from the original.) The original rear (now light-well) elevation reflected the organization of the front and also its interior functions. The central portion of the facade was defined by symmetrically flanking narrow bays that were slightly recessed. The first story had five large glazed rectangular openings in the rusticated brick which provided north light to the postal workroom. A protruding mail vestibule/loading dock occupied the center bay. At the second story, there were three large arched glazed openings with fan lights providing light to the courtroom. These were flanked by tall rectangular openings with circular attic windows directly above. Due to the courtroom height, the third story windows were only located at the flanking bays. Stone, brick, and balcony detailing continued to the rear elevation. Similar to the end elevations, the pilasters were omitted from the north facade.

The original construction used common brick exterior walls faced with buff-colored sandstone above, and light-colored granite at and below grade, and red rough faced finish brick. The walls rested on a reinforced concrete foundation. The interior structure was steel frame that was fire-proofed with concrete. Floors were reinforced concrete slabs. Hollow clay tile was used for furring and interior partitions and was typically plastered.

The 1940 addition extended the building 38.0 feet to the north. This required that the parking and loading functions be relocated to the west portion of the site. The design duplicated the original materials and most of the detailing. The new side elevations are recessed eighteen inches so that the massing of the original building is distinct. The window openings are dimensioned similar to the originals and are likewise equally spaced. The sash, however, are double hung types at all three levels. Transoms were retained at the first and second levels. The new parapet was designed to be solid stone, unlike the original which had balustraded portions. A new loading platform was constructed on the north end of the west elevation. The two pairs of loading doors were recessed and were protected from rain by a marquee. The dock also had an employee entrance. The north elevation was redesigned along the lines of the side elevations with five equally spaced window openings that utilized metal sash. The use of two outer flanking openings was retained from the original composition. At the center of the first level, three large rectangular windows provided the postal workroom with day lighting. The interior boiler chimney was relocated to the north elevation. A new fire escape, basement stairway, and areaway for the new swing room were also constructed on the north elevation. The original east, west, and south elevations were left intact with exception of the entry approach. The original ceremonial steps were replaced by dual side stairs leading to a common entry landing. The new granite stair was enclosed with wrought iron railings. The roof mounted flagpole was also relocated to the ground at this time. The addition retained much of the original north elevation by creating a new light-well on the center third, and by incorporating the remaining wall within the new construction. (Portions of the original cornice are visible from the attic.) A new concrete block (with cement plaster exterior finish) rooftop penthouse over the main stair replaced the 1916 structure at this time, and the low sloped, built-up roof construction was continued onto the addition.

There have not been extensive changes to the exterior of the building since the 1940 addition. Notable alterations include the replacement of the two outer entry doors with double hung windows (and later reversal); revisions to the wall at the loading dock and a new ramp; removal of the fire escape; site paving and planting changes; and the removal of the original parapet balustrade, which was replaced with solid stone panels similar to the 1940 addition. The open stone balustrade was later restored. A west side window of the lobby has been replaced with a fully lifted door that is reached by an accessible lift concealed in what was formerly a light-well to a basement window.

An essential element to the building's facade and integrity is its (almost complete) set of original functioning wood windows (which were recently abated). Note that windows on the north side of the building have steel frames for the wood sash units.

=== Interior ===
When the U.S. Post Office and Courthouse first opened, it provided space primarily for just those two operations. The post office occupied the first floor with the public lobby oriented east to west all along the south wall, and with the workroom to the north of the lobby. The money registry was located at the east end of the lobby, the stair wrapping around the elevator cage was at the west end. There was a short lobby extension from the stair northward to provide additional postal windows and give access to the postmaster's office at the northwest corner of the floor. A vault was placed at each end of the floor, one for the money registry and one for the postmaster. There was also a single occupancy toilet at each end of the floor. The mailing vestibule occupied the center position of the postal workroom's north wall. Although it was a construction alternate, the lobby was finished with light colored terrazzo with marble divisions and borders at the floor and wall base. The walls had stained wood wainscoting, postal windows, grills, and door casings with painted plaster above. The interior entry vestibule (center door pair only) was constructed of stained wood and glass and had two wood and glass doors. The ceiling of the lobby had ornamental plaster crown mouldings. The main stairway was constructed with grey marble treads and iron railings, stringers and risers. The original traction elevator had a steel grill enclosure and metal hoist way entrance doors with wire glass relights. The postal lobby finishes were duplicated on the second and third floor lobbies (also a construction alternate) except for the ornamental ceiling plaster. Upper lobbies were centered axially on the stair and elevator which allowed a row of offices along the south wall. The courtroom space occupied the north side of the lobby and extended through the third floor. This courtroom was finished modestly with wall coverings, smooth painted plaster, and stained wood mouldings and furnishings. A construction alternate for the courtroom was designed and shown on the bid drawings but not built. That design was built at the federal courthouse in Pendleton, Oregon, a very similar building that was constructed concurrently. Office areas on the upper two levels typically were finished with wood floors, moulded wood base, chair rail and casings, three panel wood doors, and smooth painted plaster walls and ceilings. The stained wood corridor doors were typically half-light (art glass) over two panels and had transoms.

The 1940 extension and remodeling substantially reconfigured the interior, but for the most part used matching details and materials. The axially designed lobbies were changed to a 'C' shape to provide access to the additional area. On the first floor, the larger lobby surrounded the old postal workroom on three sides. A new postal window wall replaced the original window and screen wall. New workroom space filled the addition. On the second and third floors, new corridors extended northward to the new office and judicial areas. The east corridor led to a new fire escape. A small light-well was created at the upper levels to preserve natural lighting for the courtroom through its three large windows and to the postal workroom below was lit through skylights. The smaller windows at the courtroom were converted to passageways for judges and witnesses. The original vaults and toilet rooms were removed and new ones constructed. The stairway was extended to the roof and included a new penthouse. Woodwork, doors, and stone matched the 1916 construction. The new terrazzo, which replaced the original at the lobby and was used for the corridor extensions on the upper floors, was a substantially different mix design. A darker and redder matrix of Tennessee Medium Pink, and Chesapeake Green marble was used. Existing wood floors were covered with linoleum. The new restrooms were finished with ceramic mosaic tile floors, glazed tile wainscot, new plumbing fixtures, and painted metal partitions.

Since the 1940 remodel there have been various alterations. An extensive remodeling was in undertaken in 1965 shortly after the post office left the building. At that time the first-floor lobby was removed, the stair enclosed, and the postal workroom converted to office space. Upper-level offices were also remodeled. Other recent changes include the addition of suspended ceilings, fluorescent lighting, HVAC, an interior exit stair at the northeast corner, elevator modifications. Another significant remodel occurred in 1994 including converting the first-floor lobby back to near original location, mechanical and electrical, provision of holding cells and an elevator to the courtroom, and remodeling of judge's chambers.

== See also ==
- National Register of Historic Places listings in Jackson County, Oregon
