= John Kilkenny =

American judge (1901–1995)

Senior Judge of the United States Court of Appeals for the Ninth Circuit
- In office November 1, 1971 – February 17, 1995

Judge of the United States Court of Appeals for the Ninth Circuit
- In office September 16, 1969 – November 1, 1971
- Appointed by: Richard Nixon
- Preceded by: Seat established by 82 Stat. 184
- Succeeded by: Alfred Goodwin

Judge of the United States District Court for the District of Oregon
- In office July 30, 1959 – September 26, 1969
- Appointed by: Dwight D. Eisenhower
- Preceded by: Claude C. McColloch
- Succeeded by: Alfred Goodwin

Personal details
- Born: John Francis Kilkenny; October 26, 1901 Heppner, Oregon
- Died: February 17, 1995 (aged 93) Beaverton, Oregon
- Education: Notre Dame Law School (LLB)

John Francis Kilkenny (October 26, 1901 – February 17, 1995) was a United States circuit judge of the United States Court of Appeals for the Ninth Circuit and previously was a United States district judge of the United States District Court for the District of Oregon.

== Early life ==
Kilkenny's father and uncle immigrated to Morrow County, Oregon, from County Leitrim in Ireland in the 1890s. They worked for the railroads until they had saved enough money to buy land. John Kilkenny was born in Heppner, Oregon on October 26, 1901. He was raised on a sheep farm and attended the one-room Alpine School before being sent to Portland, Oregon, where he attended the private boys' boarding school Columbia Preparatory.

After graduation, Kilkenny went on to the Notre Dame Law School, graduating in 1925 with cum laude honors earning a Bachelor of Laws. At Notre Dame, Kilkenny tried out for the football team, then coached by Knute Rockne, but a knee injury kept him from playing. He helped manage one of the teams and was assigned by Rockne the task of acquiring four horses for the Four Horsemen photograph in 1924 due to his experience growing up on a ranch.

== Legal career ==
Upon graduation he became a practicing attorney in Pendleton Oregon, until his appointment to the federal bench in 1959. In 1931 he married Virginia Brannock in Pendleton and had two children. While in private practice he served as president of the Oregon State Bar from 1943 to 1944. He then was a trustee from 1956 to 1958 of the Oregon State Library and the University of Portland.

== Federal judicial service ==
Kilkenny was nominated by President Dwight D. Eisenhower on February 19, 1959, to a seat on the United States District Court for the District of Oregon vacated by Judge Claude C. McColloch. He was confirmed by the United States Senate on July 28, 1959, and received his commission on July 30, 1959. Upon appointment to the federal district court, Kilkenny became Oregon's first Roman Catholic federal judge since Oregon had become a state in 1859. His service terminated on September 26, 1969, due to his elevation to the Ninth Circuit.

Kilkenny was nominated by President Richard Nixon on May 12, 1969, to the United States Court of Appeals for the Ninth Circuit, to a new seat authorized by 82 Stat. 184. He was confirmed by the Senate on September 12, 1969, and received his commission on September 16, 1969. He assumed senior status on November 1, 1971. His service terminated on February 17, 1995, due to his death.

== Later life ==
In 1984, the federal courthouse in Pendleton, Oregon was renamed in his honor and is now the John F. Kilkenny U.S. Post Office and Courthouse. While on the bench, Kilkenny worked to preserve Portland, Oregon's Pioneer Courthouse, receiving an award for this work in 1974 from the American Association for State and Local History.

Kilkenny was a student of Irish American history, and wrote Shamrocks and Shepherds: The Irish of Morrow County (1981), about the history of Irish settlement in Eastern Oregon. In the same year, he received an award of merit from the Oregon State Bar. He donated funds to both Blue Mountain Community College and his alma mater, Notre Dame Law School.

Kilkenny died in Beaverton, Oregon, at the age of 93 on February 17, 1995. He is buried at Olney Cemetery in Pendleton.

== Further information ==
- Kilkenny, John F. "Oral History with John F. Kilkenny." Interview conducted on June 12 and October 3, 1984, by Rick Harmon. U.S. District Court of Oregon Collection, Oregon Historical Society, Portland, Oregon, 1984. Audiotape, 15 hours, 10 minutes.

Legal offices
Preceded by Claude C. McColloch	Judge of the United States District Court for the District of Oregon; 1959–1969	Succeeded by Alfred Goodwin
Preceded by Seat established by 82 Stat. 184	Judge of the United States Court of Appeals for the Ninth Circuit; 1969–1971	Succeeded by Alfred Goodwin
