= James M. Brown (attorney) =

American lawyer (1941–2023)

11th Attorney General of Oregon
- In office March 24, 1980 – January 4, 1981
- Governor: Victor Atiyeh
- Preceded by: James A. Redden
- Succeeded by: David B. Frohnmayer

Personal details
- Born: December 9, 1941 St. Paul, Minnesota, U.S.
- Died: September 8, 2023 (aged 81) San Jose, Costa Rica
- Party: Democratic
- Spouse: Lisa M. LeSage
- Profession: Attorney

James McElwain Brown (December 9, 1941 – September 8, 2023) was an American trial attorney in private practice in Salem, Oregon, who served as Oregon Attorney General from 1980 to 1981. He was a Democrat.

Born in St. Paul, Minnesota, Brown attended American University before graduating Willamette University magna cum laude with a B.A. in 1964, and Yale Law School with an LL.B. in 1967, being admitted to the Oregon bar the same year.

He served as a Deputy District Attorney from 1970 to 1972, and as District Attorney from 1972 to 1977, in Benton County, Oregon. He was Counsel to the Governor of Oregon (1977–1979) and Assistant Attorney General (1979–1980), before being appointed as state Attorney General in 1980.

Brown died after a brief illness in San Jose, Costa Rica, on September 8, 2023, at the age of 81.

== Sources ==
- "Private Practice Lawyer Profile for James M. Brown". Lawyer Locator. New Providence, New Jersey: Lexis Nexis Martindale-Hubbell. 2006. Archived from the original on September 30, 2007.
- "Oregon Department of Justice - Agency History" (pdf). Oregon Secretary of State. 2007.

Legal offices
Preceded by James Redden	Oregon Attorney General; 1980 – 1981	Succeeded by David B. Frohnmayer
