= John F. Kilkenny United States Post Office and Courthouse =

- U.S. Post Office and Courthouse
- U.S. National Register of Historic Places
- U.S. Historic district – Contributing property
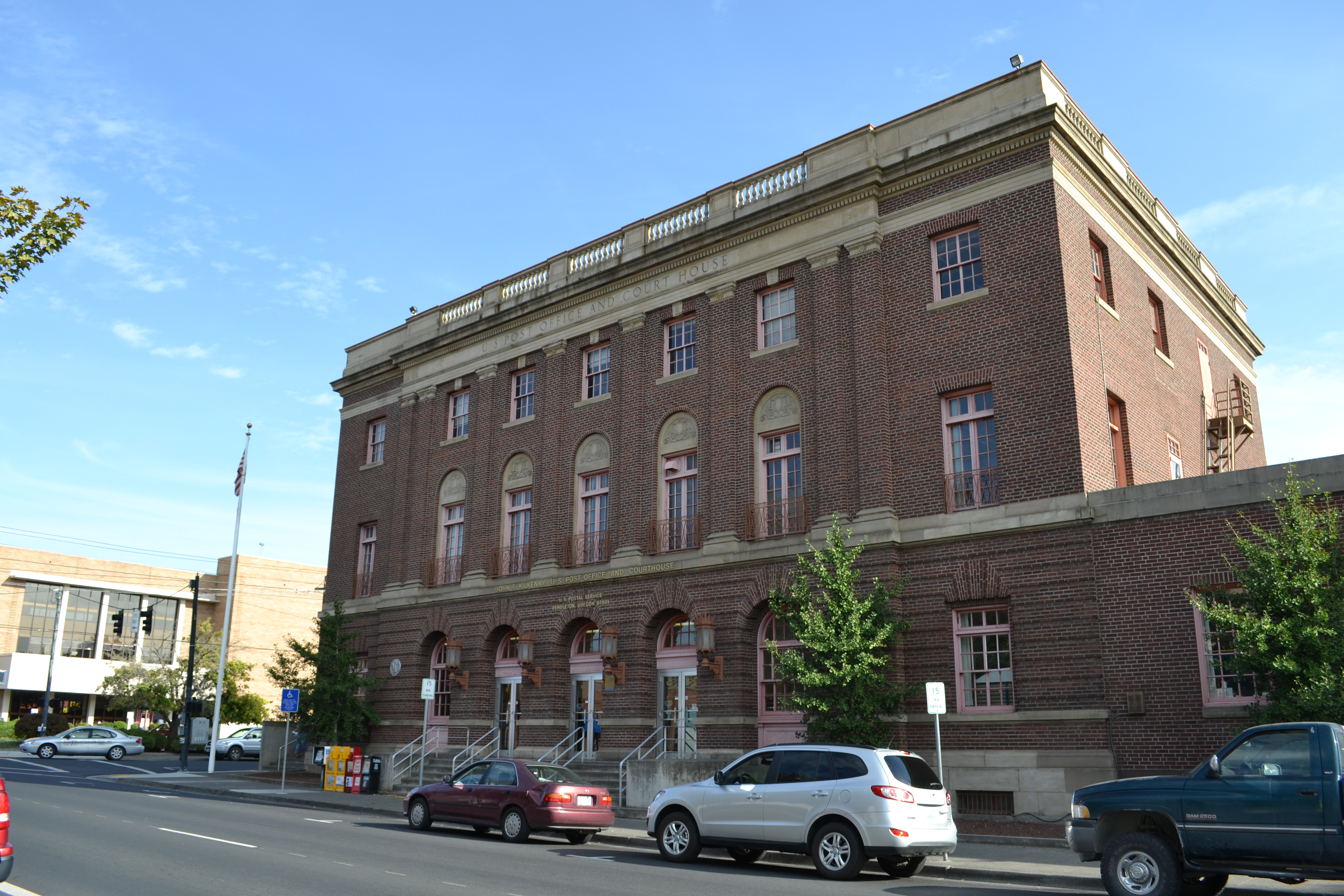

- Location within Oregon Location within the United States
- Location: 104 SW Dorion Avenue; Pendleton, Oregon
- Coordinates: 45°40′16″N 118°47′17″W
- Area: 0.72 acres (0.29 ha)
- Built: 1916
- Architect: Oscar Wenderoth
- Architectural style: Second Renaissance Revival
- Part of: South Main Street Commercial Historic District (ID86003260)
- MPS: Significant US Post Offices in Oregon 1900–1941 TR
- NRHP reference No.: 85000544
- Added to NRHP: March 4, 1985

The John F. Kilkenny United States Post Office and Courthouse, formerly the United States Post Office and Courthouse is a post office and a courthouse of the United States District Court for the District of Oregon, located in Pendleton, Oregon.

Completed in 1916 under the supervision of architect Oscar Wenderoth, the United States Congress renamed the building for John Kilkenny, a former judge of the District of Oregon and of the United States Court of Appeals for the Ninth Circuit in 1984. The building was listed on the National Register of Historic Places in 1985.

== See also ==
- National Register of Historic Places listings in Umatilla County, Oregon
