= Matthew Deady =

American judge (1824–1893)

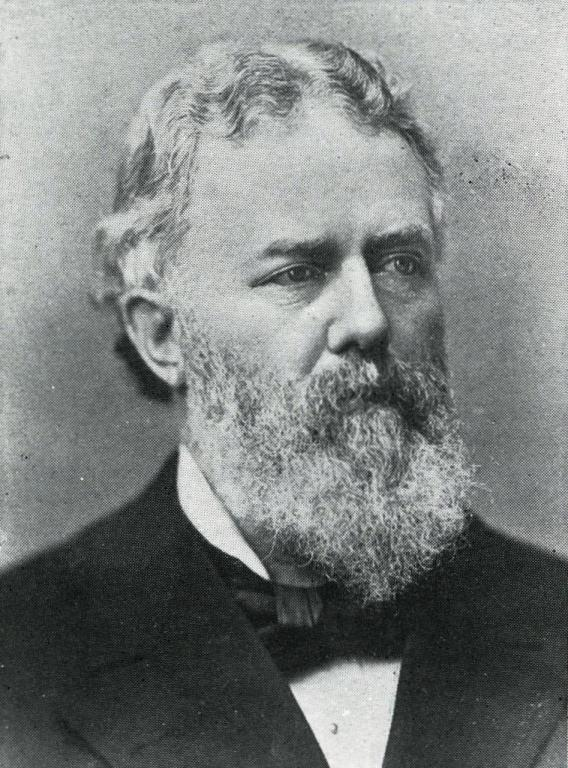

Judge of the United States District Court for the District of Oregon
- In office March 9, 1859 – March 24, 1893
- Appointed by: James Buchanan
- Preceded by: Seat established by 11 Stat. 437
- Succeeded by: Charles B. Bellinger

7th Justice of the Oregon Supreme Court
- In office 1853–1859
- Appointed by: Franklin Pierce
- Preceded by: William Strong
- Succeeded by: Paine Page Prim

President of the Oregon Territory Council
- In office 1852–1853
- Preceded by: Samuel Parker
- Succeeded by: Ralph Wilcox

Personal details
- Born: Matthew Paul Deady; May 12, 1824 Easton, Maryland, U.S.
- Died: March 24, 1893 (aged 68) Portland, Oregon, U.S.
- Party: Democratic
- Education: read law

Matthew Paul Deady (May 12, 1824 – March 24, 1893) was a politician and jurist in the Oregon Territory and the state of Oregon of the United States. He served on the Oregon Supreme Court from 1853 to 1859, at which time he was appointed to the newly created federal court of the state. He served as a United States district judge of the United States District Court for the District of Oregon in Portland, as the sole Judge until his death in 1893. While on the court he presided over the trial that led to the United States Supreme Court decision of Pennoyer v. Neff concerning personal jurisdiction.

Prior to joining the court, Deady served in the legislature of the Oregon Territory, including time served as the President of the Council, and was elected as President of the Oregon Constitutional Convention in 1857. A native of the state of Maryland, his first profession was as a blacksmith. He also spent time as a teacher in both Ohio and Oregon. Deady read law in Ohio and practiced law for a time in that state before immigrating to the Oregon Territory via the Oregon Trail. In Oregon, he helped codify the laws of the state and assisted in the foundation of the Multnomah County Library in Portland. He also was president of the University of Oregon's board of regents. The university renamed Deady Hall in his honor after his death.

== Early life ==
Matthew Paul Deady was born near Easton, Talbot County, Maryland, on May 12, 1824. His parents were Daniel and Mary Ann (McSweeny) Deady.

His father was born in Ireland on September 25, 1794, and married McSweeny on June 10, 1823. Matthew was the oldest of five children in the family. He began his education at the school where his father was a teacher, remaining at that school until the age of twelve. In 1828, the family relocated from the Baltimore, Maryland, area to Wheeling Virginia now (West Virginia). The Deadys also lived for brief periods of time in Cincinnati, Ohio and Covington, Kentucky.

In Wheeling, his father was employed as a teacher and principal at the Lancasterian Academy. On May 31, 1834, his mother died while the family was living in Wheeling. Deady's family was split up, with Matthew sent back to Baltimore for two years.

In Baltimore, he lived with an uncle and grandfather while working in a store. Deady then returned to Wheeling to live with his father while attending school and working in a local music shop. In mid-1837, he moved just across the Ohio River to the state of Ohio where his father had purchased a farm in Beaver Township.

Matthew Deady spent the next four years working for his father on the family farm, engaged in manual labor, while also reading extensively in his spare time. On February 17, 1841, he left home after a disagreement with his father and moved to Barnesville, Ohio. For four years he lived with the family of John Kelly, working as a blacksmith's apprentice.

Beginning in 1843, Deady attended Barnesville Academy, continuing his education there until four months beyond the time that his blacksmith apprenticeship ended. The apprenticeship had paid for the first six months of school. At the school he earned a certificate that allowed him to become a teacher on July 7, 1845, from his instructor Nathan R. Smith.

After graduating, Deady began teaching to pay off a debt incurred for his education, and began to read law. He read law in St. Clairsville, Ohio, under the guidance of judge and former Congressman William Kennon.

Deady passed the Ohio bar on October 26, 1847, and began practicing law in St. Clairsville at the office of Henry Kennon. He remained there until on April 17, 1849, he began his overland journey over the Oregon Trail to the newly created Oregon Territory.

== Oregon ==
Deady originally was to travel with a government designated Indian agent and the agent's family. At Fort Leavenworth the agent remained, and Deady continued his journey in the company of a United States Army regiment bound for Fort Vancouver. Taking the Oregon Trail, he arrived where Portland, Oregon, now stands on November 14, 1849. The next day, he went to neighboring Oregon City, and then a few days later, he moved west to Lafayette, Oregon, the county seat of Yamhill County. Deady began teaching as his occupation to make ends meet. He first worked for room and board, but for the second term of the school year he was paid $75 per month.

While teaching he was consulted by the county commissioner and helped to set up the courts and laws in Yamhill County. In March 1850, he began practicing law in Oregon, appearing for three cases before judge Orville C. Pratt held at a local tavern. After receiving payment for his services, he sent $100 back to Ohio to Henry Kennon to pay off some debt.

That summer he worked for Peter H. Burnett’s brother, Elder Glen Burnett, running his store while Burnett was in California acquiring supplies. While working at the store he sold many supplies to the local Native Americans and learned some Chinook Jargon from them.

On June 24, 1852, Deady married Lucy A. Henderson, with whom he had three children who survived childbirth. Lucy came to Oregon in 1846 with her parents Robert Henderson and Rhoda Holman from Kentucky. The Deady's children were three sons; Edward Nesmith (born 1853), Paul Robert (born 1856), and Henderson Brooke (born 1869). Henderson studied medicine, while Paul and Edward became attorneys like their father. Matthew Geoffrey (born 1860) and Mary (born 1866) died at birth.

While practicing law at Lafayette he represented Adam Wimple of neighboring Polk County after Wimple had been charged for murdering his wife. Deady represented him at trial and was to receive as payment Wimple's land claim via his will. Wimple was convicted of the murder and sentenced to death, but was hanged only after being recaptured from a jail break.

In 1852, Deady was among many legal minds and politicians in the territory such as Joseph C. Avery and Robert Moore that signed a petition asking Governor John P. Gaines to pardon Nimrod O'Kelly after O'Kelly's controversial conviction for the murder of Jeremiah Mahoney. O'Kelly was eventually spared from the gallows.

== Political career ==
Deady was elected to the Oregon Territorial Legislature in 1850, where he represented Yamhill County as a Democrat in the lower chamber House of Representatives. He attended the session held in Oregon City beginning in December, where he met James W. Nesmith and Asahel Bush for the first time. Those three became influential leaders of the Democratic Party in the Oregon Territory, and later the state of Oregon. Deady was an early member of the Democratic Party in the territory.

During his initial session in the territorial legislature in 1850, Deady served on the judicial committee and helped draft many of the laws in the territory. The Oregon Territory had just been created by the United States Congress in 1848, with the territorial government taking control in early 1849.

Following the 1850 to 1851 session, the secretary of the territory, Edward D. Hamilton, asked Deady to assist in publishing the laws passed by the legislature for all previous sessions of the legislative assembly. Deady helped with this process, in what became the first volume of laws published in Oregon, Deady's General Laws of Oregon.

In 1851, Deady was elected to the upper chamber Council, and the following session served as President of that chamber.

During the 1851 session he served as chairman of the council's judiciary committee. In all, Deady attended two regular sessions and one special session of the legislature from 1851 to 1853.

== Territorial judicial service ==
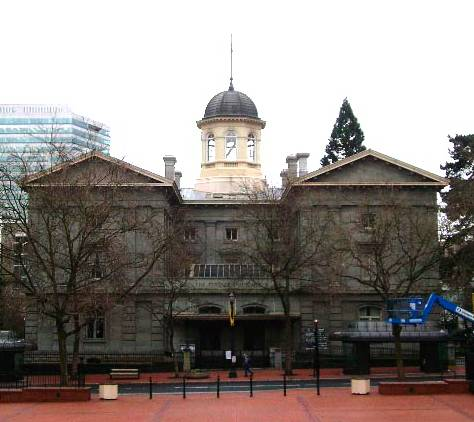
First federal courthouse in Portland

In 1853, Obadiah McFadden delivered a commission from Franklin Pierce making Deady a justice of the Territorial Supreme Court. However, it was subsequently discovered that the commission named "Mordecai P. Deady"; as there was no such person, Deady withdrew from the court on the grounds that the commission was invalid, with McFadden taking his place for the remainder of the term. Historian Sidney Teiser noted contemporary speculation that both the commission and the error were the result of interference by Joseph Lane: as a result of the commission, Deady abandoned his plans to run against Lane in an upcoming election, and as a result of the commission being nullified, Lane had the opportunity to recommend someone else as Deady's replacement. Regardless, Pierce re-appointed Deady to the court in 1857.

At this time justices of the court also rode circuit, presiding over trials in designated counties in addition to serving as an appellate court judge for the Supreme Court. Deady was assigned to the southern counties of the territory, holding court in each county twice per year.

During this time on the court, in the Spring of 1853, he moved south to a farm in the Umpqua River valley. After paying a squatter $100 for the land on Campas Swale, Deady filed for a land claim under the Donation Land Claim Act and moved the family there in the fall, naming it Fair Oaks. While on the court, he helped to establish the court systems in four of the counties in Southern Oregon, and traveled around 1,500 miles (2,400 km) each year to hold court. He won election to a full term in 1858 to take effect once Oregon became a state, but resigned before taking office in 1859.

In 1857, Deady was elected as a delegate to the Oregon Constitutional Convention. The convention was held in the territorial capital of Salem to prepare the territory for statehood. He became president of the body and was influential in shaping the new state constitution, which outlawed slavery but excluded African Americans from settling in the new state.

Deady successfully advocated for provisions in the document to set six-year terms for judges, four-year terms for state officers, and biennial sessions for the legislature. He also led the southern party, which opposed state education in all forms.

Before Secession (Civil War), Deady held views that were racist and proslavery. Deady supported a constitutional provision that excluded free Blacks from the State of Oregon, a provision that won the approval of 89% percent of Oregon voters. He was paraphrased as approving the Dred Scott decision. He also reportedly advocated for discrimination towards Chinese immigrants.

== Federal judicial service ==
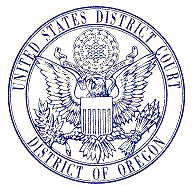
Seal of the U.S. District Court of Oregon

Following admission of the State of Oregon to the Union on February 14, 1859, Deady was nominated by President James Buchanan on March 7, 1859, to the United States District Court for the District of Oregon, to a new seat authorized by 11 Stat. 437. He was confirmed by the United States Senate on March 9, 1859, and received his commission the same day. His service terminated on March 24, 1893, due to his death.

=== Tenure on the court ===
Deady held the first session of the court on September 12, 1859, in Salem, but had the court relocated to Portland by the start of the September session of 1860. He moved to Portland where he helped to found the Multnomah County Library. He served as president of that organization for a number of years. In Portland, he wrote the articles of incorporation for the city, which became the standard in the state for other cities. At first Portland did not have a courthouse for Deady to use, so he rented two rooms from Benjamin Stark on what is now Water Street until a federal courthouse was built beginning in 1869. That courthouse was first named the United States Building, and is now named the Pioneer Courthouse, with Deady moving into the building when it was finished in 1875.

In 1867, United States Supreme Court justice Stephen Johnson Field assigned Deady to serve as a circuit court judge for the United States circuit court located in San Francisco, California. Deady did the same in 1868 and 1869 since there was no circuit court judge assigned to the West Coast at that time, spending three months in San Francisco each year. This was a common practice during this period, as United States Supreme Court justices still rode circuit, and often assigned federal district court judges to serve on the appellate level circuit courts. The Judiciary Act of 1869 reduced much of this process, as did the Judiciary Act of 1891 that established the current United States courts of appeals with Oregon in the Ninth Circuit. While serving on the district court, Deady served as president of the Board of Regents of the State University (later University of Oregon) from 1873 to 1893. He also designed the university's seal, which is still used by the school.

In 1871, in McKay v. Campbell, Deady ruled in the suit brought by Dr. William Cameron McKay, who had born in 1824 in Astoria, in the Oregon Country. The United States and Great Britain had jointly held the Oregon Country until 1846, at which time Astoria became part of the United States. Deady wrote that McKay did not become a US citizen under the 14th Amendment's citizenship clause, because at birth, he had not been under the sole jurisdiction of United States. In response the following year, Oregon Senator Henry Corbett introduced legislation, ultimately successful, to reverse the debility that Deady had imposed. In a blogpost, Michael L. Rosin argues that the debates indicate that members believed the phrase "subject to the jurisdiction of the United States" in the bill could not mean “not subject to any foreign power.” This was the first birthright citizenship legislation in the United States after the passage of the 14th Amendment.

In 1874, in a district court case, Deady ruled in favor of Marcus Neff in a lawsuit against Sylvester Pennoyer concerning unpaid legal fees to John H. Mitchell and a sheriff's auction of Neff's land to Pennoyer. The case became the landmark U.S. Supreme Court decision of Pennoyer v. Neff that helped define the law of personal jurisdiction.

In 1885, Deady admitted Mary Leonard to the federal bar, the first woman admitted to practice in Oregon, though the Oregon Supreme Court at first denied her admittance to the state bar on technical grounds. Later that year the Oregon legislature resolved the technical issue in the statute and the state high court admitted Leonard into the state bar.

Among Deady's work is the General Laws of Oregon, which he compiled and annotated in 1866. This work consisted of a Code of Civil Procedure, a Penal Code, and a Code of Criminal Procedure. In this role he not only codified existing laws, but also made new laws. Deady often drafted the legislation that led to state statutes, thus playing a crucial role in the lawmaking process in the state of Oregon between 1859 and 1872.

In 1874, Deady and fellow code commissioner and later U.S. Representative Lafayette Lane updated Deady's earlier compilation of the state's laws. His criminal laws remained largely in effect in Oregon until the legislature revised much of those laws in 1971. Deady also was the author of the state's business incorporation act. The act was the first in the country to place all business corporations on the same level by requiring a minimum of three people to incorporate as a business.

Regarding Deady's contributions to Oregon, former Oregon Supreme Court justice and United States Attorney General George Henry Williams said: "No hand has been so strongly and deeply impressed upon the legislative and judicial history of Oregon as that of Judge Deady."

== Later years, death, and legacy ==
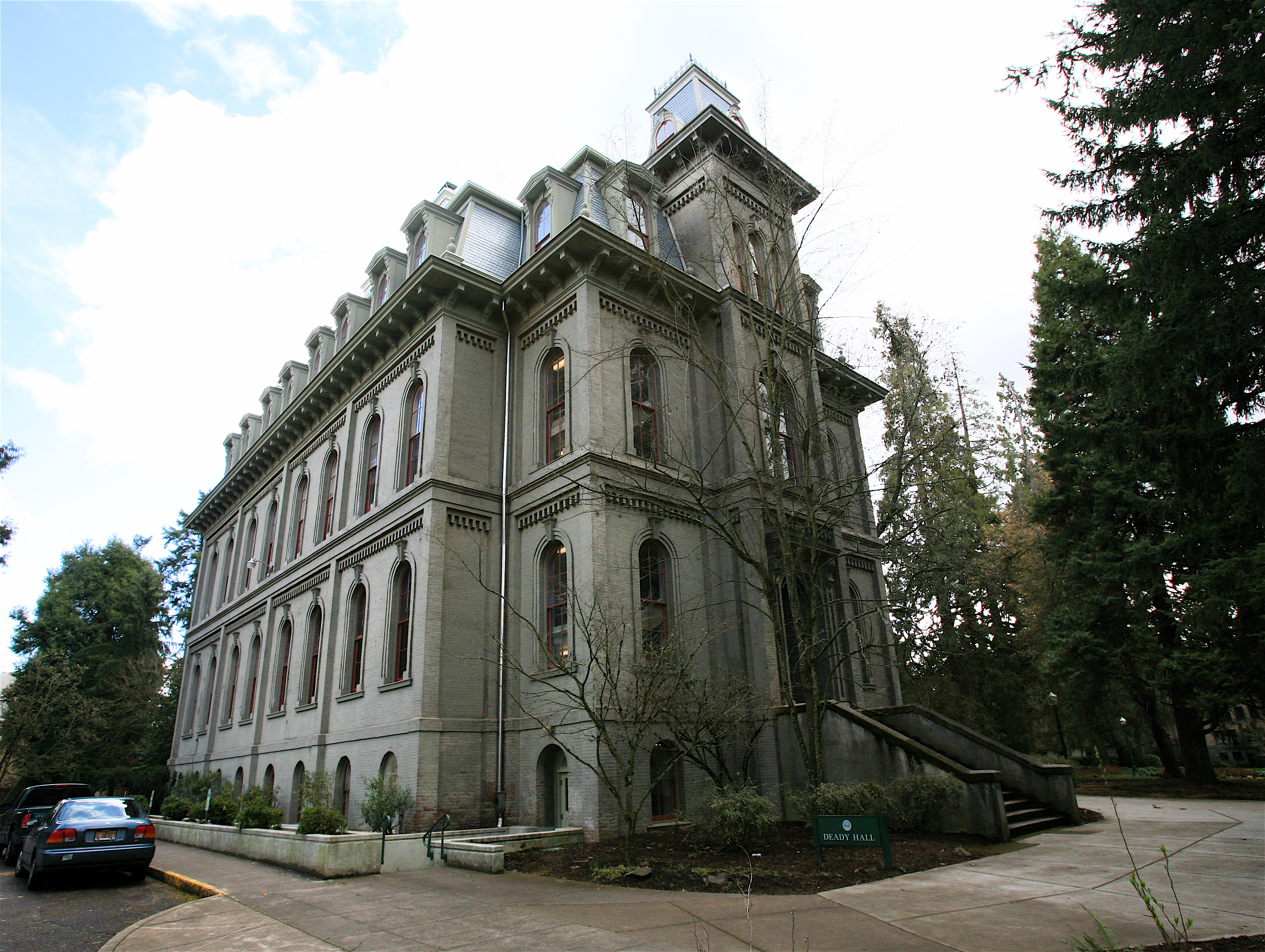
University Hall, formerly Deady Hall, at the University of Oregon

As a prominent figure in Portland he continually worked to raise funds for the library he supported. He also relied on financial help from his associates in order to supplement his small salary as a federal judge. This allowed him to keep his personal appearance inline with what was expected of prominent citizens. In contravention to his earlier stances during the Oregon Constitutional Convention, Deady later denounced violence against Chinese Americans during the 1870s and 1880s, even convening a grand jury to examine charging anti-Chinese crowds with criminal acts. These crowds were threatening violence against these minorities in an attempt to expel the immigrants from the state.

In Portland, Deady helped establish the University of Oregon's law school. As the first public law school in the state, the University of Oregon School of Law opened in 1884 with an address by Deady. The school later moved to the main campus in Eugene.

In a throwback to Pennoyer v. Neff, Deady had an outsized role in the 1885 election of Mitchell, the unethical lawyer who was a centerpoint of the case. Deady came into possession of Mitchell's love-letters from yet another affair, and exposed them to The Oregonian, who gleefully published them. Mitchell's re-election was decried by Deady.

From his work in California, the state bar in that state passed a resolution of thanks for Deady's work. He was also named as a regent to Stanford University by then United States Senator Leland Stanford. Deady gave many public speeches and was a prolific writer on the law and other subjects, in addition to his national reputation in the legal field. Deady was elected a member of the American Antiquarian Society in 1888.

In 1878, Matthew's father Daniel died. In October 1892, he suffered a stroke, but continued to preside over the courtroom. Matthew Paul Deady died in Portland on March 24, 1893, at the age of 68. Matthew's wife Lucy died in 1923, followed by son Henderson in 1933. The eldest son Edward died in 1914, with middle son Paul's death coming in 1920.

In 1893, the first building at the University of Oregon was renamed in Deady's honor. Built in 1876, Deady Hall joined the National Register of Historic Places in 1972 and was designated a National Historic Landmark in 1977.

Due to continued political pressure from the University of Oregon community regarding Deady's racist views, Deady Hall was the target of a renaming effort. On May 6, 2016, President of the University, Michael H. Schill set forth a collection of criteria to determine Deady's potential denaming. In January, Schill sent a letter to the university community explaining why he would "not recommend to the Board of Trustees that it dename Deady Hall". The Board of Trustees received his report and the objections of the president of the Associated Students of the University of Oregon at its meeting on March 2, 2017. Three years later, however, on June 10, 2020, Schill sent a letter to the Board of Trustees, this time recommending the denaming of Deady Hall. On June 24, Deady's name was removed from the hall and University Hall was selected as an interim name.

== Works ==
- The Code of Civil Procedure and Other General Statutes of Oregon: Enacted by the Legislative Assembly at the Session Commencing September 8, A.D. 1862. With A. C. Gibbs and James K. Kelly. Salem, OR: Asahel Bush, State Printer, 1863.
- The Organic and Other General Laws of Oregon, Together with the National Constitution and Other Public Acts and Statutes of the United States. 1845–1864. Portland, OR: H.L. Pittock, State Printer, 1866.
- Reports of Cases Determined in the Circuit and District Courts of the United States of Oregon and California. A.L. Bancroft: San Francisco, 1872.
- The Organic and Other General Laws of Oregon, Together with the National Constitution and Other Public Acts and Statutes of the United States: 1843–1872. With Lafayette Lane. Portland, OR: E. Semple, State Printer, 1874.
- History and Progress of Oregon After 1845: In Continuation of the History of Oregon Before 1845, as Given in Deady's Address to the Pioneers at Salem in 1875. With Hubert Howe Bancroft.
- Wallamet or Willamette. Portland: G.H. Himes, 1875.
- An Address to the Graduating Class of Wallamet University. Portland: Geo. H. Himes' Steam Printing Establishment, 1876.
- "Annual Address to the Oregon Pioneer Association." 1876.
- Oration Delivered at Roseburg. Roseburg, OR: Committee of Arrangements, 1877.
- An Address to the Graduating Class of the University of Oregon. Portland: G.H. Himes, 1878.
- The Dallas Methodist Mission Cases: Opinion of the Court. Portland: G.H. Himes, 1879.
- "To Be or To Have": 1879: An Address to the Graduating Class of the University of Oregon. Portland: Board of Regents, 1879.
- Commencement Address Delivered at St. Helen's Hall, Portland, Oregon. Portland: 1880.
- Oration Delivered at Portland by Matthew P. Deady ... July 4, 1885. Portland: A. G. Walling, 1885.
- "Towns and Cities": University of Oregon Commencement 1886 Address. Portland: Board of Regents, 1886.
- Addresses by Matthew P. Deady, U. S. District Judge: Centennial Celebration Washington's Inauguration, Portland, Oregon, April 30, 1889, and Fourth of July, Vancouver, Washington, 1889. Portland: Himes Printing Co., 1890.
- Pharisee Among Philistines: The Diary of Judge Matthew P. Deady, 1871–1892. In Two Volumes. Portland: Oregon Historical Society, 1975.

== See also ==
- List of United States federal judges by longevity of service

Legal offices
Preceded by Seat established by 11 Stat. 437	Judge of the United States District Court for the District of Oregon; 1859–1893	Succeeded by Charles B. Bellinger
