= Michael Robert Hogan =

American judge (born 1946)

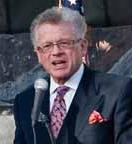
- Hogan in 2006

Senior Judge of the United States District Court for the District of Oregon
- In office September 24, 2011 – November 1, 2012

Chief Judge of the United States District Court for the District of Oregon
- In office 1995–2002
- Preceded by: James A. Redden
- Succeeded by: Ancer L. Haggerty

Judge of the United States District Court for the District of Oregon
- In office September 16, 1991 – September 24, 2011
- Appointed by: George H. W. Bush
- Preceded by: Seat established by 104 Stat. 5089
- Succeeded by: Michael J. McShane

Magistrate Judge of the United States District Court for the District of Oregon
- In office 1973–1991

Bankruptcy Judge of the United States District Court for the District of Oregon
- In office 1973–1980

Personal details
- Born: Michael Robert Hogan; September 24, 1946 Oregon City, Oregon
- Died: November 28, 2025 (aged 79) Eugene, Oregon, U.S.
- Education: University of Oregon (BA); Georgetown University Law Center (JD)

Michael Robert Hogan (September 24, 1946 – November 28, 2025) was a United States district judge of the United States District Court for the District of Oregon. He served as chief judge from 1995 to 2002. He was based at the Wayne L. Morse United States Courthouse in Eugene, Oregon. While he was Chief Judge, he was an influential force on the design of the new courthouse. He took senior status with the court on September 24, 2011 and retired on November 1, 2012.

== Education and career ==
Born in Oregon City, Oregon, Hogan received a Bachelor of Arts degree, with honors, from the University of Oregon in 1968 and received his Juris Doctor from Georgetown University Law Center in 1971. Hogan was a law clerk for Judge Robert C. Belloni after law school. He then went into private practice in Portland before becoming a bankruptcy judge with the District Court in 1973. Later he continued with the district as a United States Magistrate.

== Federal judicial service ==
On June 27, 1991, Hogan was nominated by President George H. W. Bush to a new seat on the United States District Court for the District of Oregon created by 104 Stat. 5089. Hogan was confirmed by the United States Senate on September 12, 1991, and received commission on September 16, 1991. He served as Chief Judge from 1995 to 2002, took senior status on September 24, 2011, and retired on November 1, 2012.

In June 1994, the Malheur National Wildlife Refuge manager notified Dwight Hammond that his permit to graze his cattle and grow hay on the refuge was revoked. Two months later, Hammond and his son Steven obstructed the completion of a refuge boundary fence intended to keep their cattle out of the refuge's protected marsh and wetland, prompting their arrest by federal agents. The fence was needed to stop the Hammonds' cattle from moving onto the refuge after the ranchers had repeatedly violated the terms of their special grazing permit, which limited those times when they could move their cattle across refuge property. Officials also reported that Dwight had made death threats against refuge managers in 1986, 1988, 1991, and 1994; and that Steven Hammond also made incendiary remarks against them.

In 1999 Steven started a fire, intending to burn off juniper trees and sagebrush, but the fire escaped onto BLM land. The agency reminded him of the required burn permit and that if the fires continued, there would be legal consequences. Both Dwight and Steven Hammond later set more fires, one in 2001 and one in 2006, that would lead to eventual convictions of arson on federal land: The 2001 Hardie-Hammond fire began after hunters in the area witnessed the Hammonds illegally slaughtering a herd of deer. Less than two hours later, a fire erupted, forcing the hunters to leave the area but also intending to conceal evidence of the deer herd slaughter. Steven's nephew Dusty Hammond testified his uncle told him to "light the whole countryside on fire," and that in doing so. he was "almost burned up in the fire," having to flee for his life. The Hammonds claimed they started the fire to stop invasive plants from growing onto their grazing fields. The 2006 Krumbo Butte fire started out as a wildfire, but several illegal backburns were set by the Hammonds with an intent of protecting their winter feed. The backfires were set under the cover of night, without warning the firefighters they knew were camped on the slopes above. The fires threatened to trap four BLM firefighters. One of those later confronted Dwight Hammond at the fire scene after he had moved his crews to avoid the danger. Two days later, Steven Hammond threatened to frame a BLM employee with arson if he didn't terminate the investigation. In 2012, the Hammonds were tried in federal district court on multiple charges. During a break in jury deliberations, partial verdicts were rendered, convicting them on two counts of arson on federal land. Striking a plea bargain, in order to have the four remaining charges dismissed and for sentences on the two convictions to run concurrently, the Hammonds waived their rights to appeal their convictions. They knew the trial would proceed to sentencing at which the prosecution intended to seek imposition of the statute's mandatory five-year minimum sentences, under the Antiterrorism and Effective Death Penalty Act of 1996 (AEDPA). Judge Hogan independently decided that sentences of that length "would shock the conscience" and would violate the constitutional prohibition on cruel and unusual punishment. On his last day on the bench before retiring, October 31, 2012, Hogan instead sentenced Dwight Hammond to three months' imprisonment and Steven Hammond to a year and a day's imprisonment and then retired on November 1, 2012. Both men served those sentences.

However, in what was described by one source as a "rare" action, the government (represented by the United States Attorney's Office for the District of Oregon, led by U.S. Attorney Amanda Marshall) successfully appealed the sentence to the United States Court of Appeals for the Ninth Circuit. The appellate court upheld the mandatory-minimum law, writing that "given the seriousness of arson, a five-year sentence is not grossly disproportionate to the offense." The court vacated the original sentence and remanded for re-sentencing. The Hammonds filed petitions for certiorari with the U.S. Supreme Court, which the court denied in March 2015. In October 2015, Chief Judge Ann Aiken re-sentenced the pair to five years in prison (with credit for time served), ordering that they return to prison on January 4, 2016. Both of the Hammonds reported to Federal Correctional Institution, Terminal Island in California on January 4, as ordered by the court. A few days earlier, the Hammonds also paid the federal government the remaining balance on a US$400,000 court order for restitution related to the arson fires.

Legal offices
Preceded by Seat established by 104 Stat. 5089	Judge of the United States District Court for the District of Oregon; 1991–2011	Succeeded by Michael J. McShane
Preceded by James A. Redden	Chief Judge of the United States District Court for the District of Oregon; 1995–2002	Succeeded by Ancer L. Haggerty
