= James A. Redden =

American judge and politician (1929–2020)

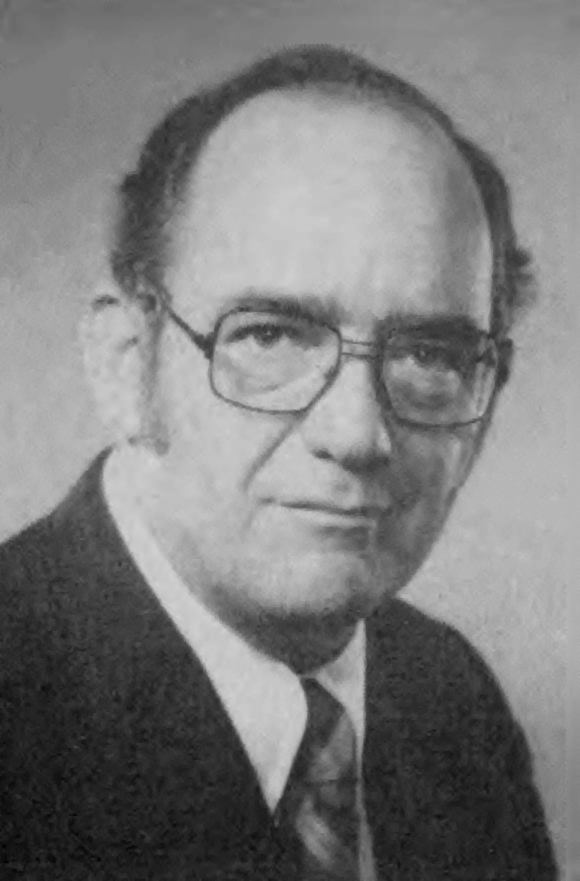

Senior Judge of the United States District Court for the District of Oregon
- In office March 13, 1995 – March 31, 2020

Chief Judge of the United States District Court for the District of Oregon
- In office 1990–1995
- Preceded by: Owen M. Panner
- Succeeded by: Michael Robert Hogan

Judge of the United States District Court for the District of Oregon
- In office February 20, 1980 – March 13, 1995
- Appointed by: Jimmy Carter
- Preceded by: Seat established by 92 Stat. 1629
- Succeeded by: Ann Aiken

10th Oregon Attorney General
- In office January 3, 1977 – March 24, 1980
- Governor: Robert W. Straub; Victor Atiyeh
- Preceded by: Lee Johnson
- Succeeded by: James M. Brown

Oregon State Treasurer
- In office January 1, 1973 – January 3, 1977
- Governor: Tom McCall
- Preceded by: Robert W. Straub
- Succeeded by: H. Clay Myers Jr.

Member of the Oregon House of Representatives
- In office 1963–1969

Personal details
- Born: James Anthony Redden Jr. March 13, 1929 Springfield, Massachusetts, U.S.
- Died: March 31, 2020 (aged 91) Beaverton, Oregon, U.S.
- Party: Democratic
- Spouse: Joan Johnson (m. 1951; died 2018)
- Children: 2
- Education: Boston College; Boston College Law School (LLB)

James Anthony Redden Jr. (March 13, 1929 – March 31, 2020) was an American judge and politician from Oregon. He was a senior United States district judge of the United States District Court for the District of Oregon, from 1995 to 2020, and, before that, had served as a federal judge since 1980. Before his appointment to the bench, he was a trial attorney, and a career Democratic politician, serving as a legislator and in two of the state's constitutional offices, as Treasurer and Attorney General.

== Early life and education ==
Redden was born in Springfield, Massachusetts, the third child of James A. Redden Sr., a dentist, and his wife, Alma. He spent his early childhood in their home on Bronson Terrace at the eastern edge of Forest Park, where for a time his father also maintained his dental office. During what he would later describe as a "mediocre" high school career, Redden enlisted in the United States Army in 1946, serving two years as a PFC in occupied Japan. He was assigned as a hospital medic and witnessed the aftermath of the bombing of Hiroshima firsthand. He married Joan Johnson in 1951 and took several low-end jobs, including working coding survey sheets for the Gillette Razor Company, and managed not only to earn a belated high school diploma, but went on to Boston College and Boston College Law School, graduating with a Bachelor of Laws in 1954, and was admitted to the Massachusetts bar the same year.

== Career ==
=== Law ===
After engaging in the private practice of law in Massachusetts for only a year, Redden moved to Portland, Oregon, in 1955 to take the Oregon State Bar exam and a position with a title insurance company. His work as a title examiner lasted only one year, followed by an equally brief tenure as a claims adjuster for Allstate Insurance Company. Neither position satisfied what he would later describe as a growing passion for the law, particularly as it plays out in the courtroom. Redden lived for the next seventeen years in Medford, Oregon, where he built a law practice. He became immersed in politics, quickly becoming regarded as one of the Democratic Party's "rising stars".

=== Politics ===
It was as a favor to a friend seeking a challenger to the incumbent Republican for the 19th District in the Oregon House of Representatives that Redden entered his first political race in 1962. He won the race and served for six years in the House, becoming the party Minority Leader in 1967. As a legislator, Redden was a key figure in some of Oregon's most groundbreaking legislative initiatives, including brokering the deal which brought the passage of the state's 1967 public beach access law. In 1969 Redden moved to the executive branch, becoming chairman of the Public Employee Relations Board until 1972. From 1973 to 1976 he was the state treasurer, and from 1977 to 1980, he was the Oregon Attorney General.

=== Jurist ===
Redden was nominated by President Jimmy Carter on December 3, 1979, to a new seat on the United States District Court for the District of Oregon created by 92 Stat. 1629. He was confirmed by the United States Senate and received his commission on February 20, 1980. He served as Chief Judge from 1990 to 1995, and then assumed senior status on March 13, 1995. He assumed inactive senior status on March 31, 2017.

== Notable cases ==
In 1983, Redden dismissed weapons charges, from 1975, against American Indian Movement leader Dennis Banks.

After 2003, Redden emerged as a central figure in the tension between industry and environmental concerns about the hydroelectric dams on the Columbia River, rejecting two management plans advanced by the federal government of the United States, on the grounds that they failed to protect various species of salmon, as required by the Endangered Species Act, and suggested that if the Bush administration failed to adequately address the salmon issue, management of the dams could fall to the courts. In November 2011, he announced that he would remove himself from the case prior to a new plan that the government presented in 2014.

== Personal life ==
Redden married Joan Johnson in 1951; she predeceased him in 2018. They had two sons, William and James; James is a journalist at the Portland Tribune. Redden died in Beaverton on March 31, 2020, eighteen days after his 91st birthday, shortly after being treated for congestive heart failure. He had been living in an adult foster care home.

== Honors ==
The federal courthouse in Medford, Oregon, where Redden practiced law for 17 years, was renamed by an Act of Congress in his honor.

Political offices
Preceded by Robert W. Straub	Oregon State Treasurer; 1973–1976	Succeeded by H. Clay Myers Jr.
Legal offices
Preceded by Lee Johnson	Oregon Attorney General; 1977–1980	Succeeded by James M. Brown
Preceded by Seat established by 92 Stat. 1629	Judge of the United States District Court for the District of Oregon; 1980–1995	Succeeded by Ann Aiken
Preceded by Owen M. Panner	Chief Judge of the United States District Court for the District of Oregon; 1990–1995	Succeeded by Michael Robert Hogan
