= Mark O. Hatfield United States Courthouse =

Federal courthouse in Portland, Oregon, U.S.

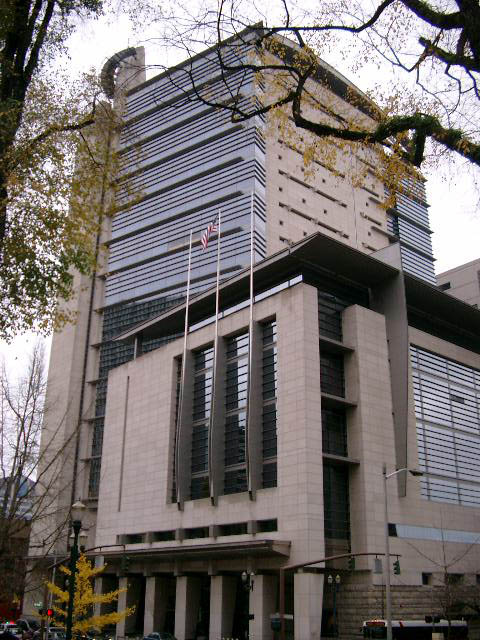
- Hatfield Courthouse

- Location within Portland, Oregon

General information
- Type: courthouse
- Location: Portland, Oregon
- Coordinates: 45°30′57″N 122°40′35″W
- Completed: 1997
- Owner: United States government

Height
- Height: 318 feet (97 m)

Technical details
- Floor count: 16
- Floor area: 563,000 square feet (52,300 m^{2})

Design and construction
- Architects: Kohn Pedersen Fox Associates; Bora Architects (formerly BOORA and Broome, Oringdulph, O'Toole, Rudolph & Associates)
- Main contractor: Hoffman Construction Company

The Mark O. Hatfield United States Courthouse is a federal courthouse in Portland, Oregon. It is named in honor of former U.S. Senator Mark O. Hatfield. It is used by the United States District Court for the District of Oregon.

The federal government originally planned to increase courtroom space in Portland by building a 13-story annex adjacent to the Gus J. Solomon United States Courthouse. In 1992, the government shifted to the construction of a new building across the street from the Multnomah County Justice Center, where federal prisoners are held for trial. The General Services Administration chose what was then known as the Hamilton Hotel block between Second and Third avenues and Salmon and Main streets for the courthouse.

With 16 stories, the courthouse rises to a height of 318 feet (97 m), making it the tenth-tallest building in Portland. The design is a collaboration between the architecture firms Kohn Pedersen Fox Associates of New York and Bora Architects previously named Broome, Oringdulph, O'Toole, Rudolph & Associates of Portland, Oregon. It was completed in 1997 at a cost of $129 million, making it the fifth most-expensive courthouse of its size constructed in the 1990s. The building contains approximately 563,000 square feet (52,300 m^{2}). Upon completion the District Court moved from the Solomon Courthouse that was built in 1933.

The building's architecture is distinctive and contemporary, especially when compared with Portland's older, primarily rectilinear towers. The distinctive cantilevered roof shelters a small green planting area which is visible to traffic approaching on Washington Street. Designed with energy efficiency in mind, the building exceeded Oregon's Energy Code by 29 percent when it was built.

== History ==
In 1994, the General Services Administration launched a five-year plan calling for the construction of hundreds of new federal facilities – courthouses, agency offices, research labs, and border stations - in the biggest public building boom ever. GSA sought to elevate the design of courthouses and other federal buildings through its Design Excellence Program, which encourages design by nationally prominent contemporary American architects and invites prominent architects and critics to join judges and agency heads on the selection panels. This overhaul of government design was led by Edward Feiner, Chief Architect of GSA's Public Buildings Service. The new program called for regional sensitivity and urban vitality in federal architecture.

The Mark O. Hatfield Federal Courthouse was designed and detailed by Kohn Pederson Fox Associates (KPF) of New York City, New York; and Portland's BOORA Architects, who were actually selected by a GSA panel before the institution of the Design Excellence Program. The design won a 1994 GSA National Honor Award, one of two honor awards given by GSA for new federal buildings in 1994.

The site selected for the structure is in downtown Portland, overlooking the Plaza Blocks, a trio of civic parks shared by City Hall and other civic buildings, including Michael Grave's 1984 Portland Building. The construction of the new courthouse on this site required the removal of the Hamilton Hotel, a property eligible for inclusion in the National Register of Historic Places, and underground structures associated with 19th-century Chinese commercial activity in Portland. GSA, the Oregon State Historic Preservation Office (SHPO) and the Advisory Council on Historic Preservation entered into a Memorandum of Agreement in order to take into account the effect of the undertaking on the historic properties. The agreement contained several stipulations, including Historic American Buildings Survey (HABS) documentation of the Hamilton Hotel, salvage of architecturally and historically significant items, and archaeological testing, monitoring, and recovery from the site. It was agreed that a portion of the collection of the archaeological artifacts and specimens would be displayed in the first-floor lobby of the courthouse.

The Arts in Architecture program for the courthouse was enhanced by GSA's participation in the City of Portland's percent for arts Floor-Area-Ratio (FAR) bonus credits. In November 1994, the Community Arts panel reviewed credentials and slides representing approximately 200 artists. From this extensive list, the panel recommended four artists and sites for GSA review and approval. GSA concurred and approved the selections. The artists and sites include Eric Orr - Main Lobby; Sandra Stone - Main Lobby; Tom Otterness - 8th Floor Roof Terrace; and Judith Poxson Fawkes – 16th Floor Special Proceedings Courtroom.

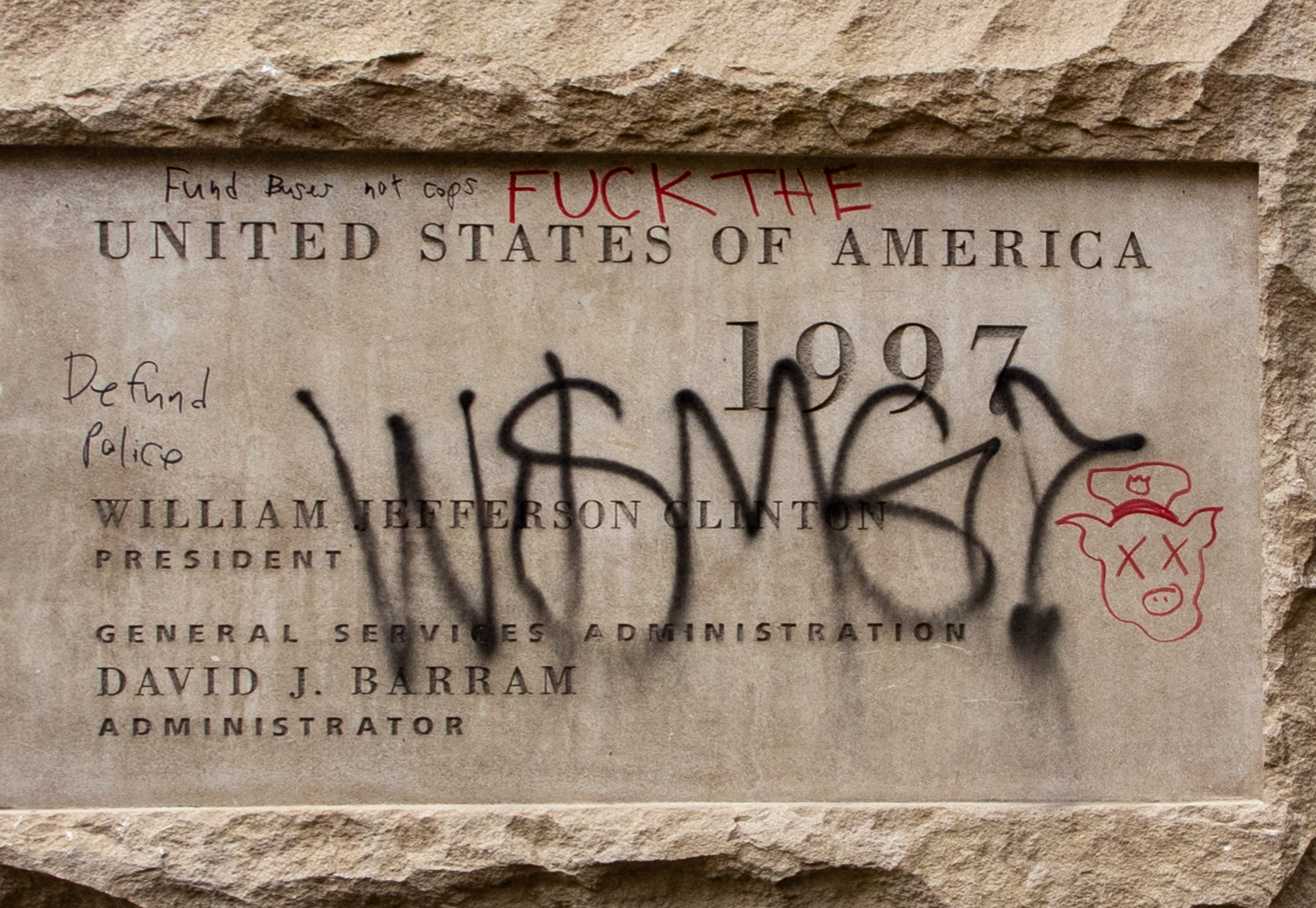
Cornerstone of the building with graffiti from the George Floyd protests

The design of the building was initiated in October 1992. The base building was competitively bid at 92.3 million dollars. Site demolition, foundation, and non-court tenant improvements were constructed under separate contracts for a total construction cost of 97.9 million dollars. Construction began in June 1994 and was substantially completed in September 1997.

The courthouse became a significant target during the Portland George Floyd protests.

== Architectural description ==
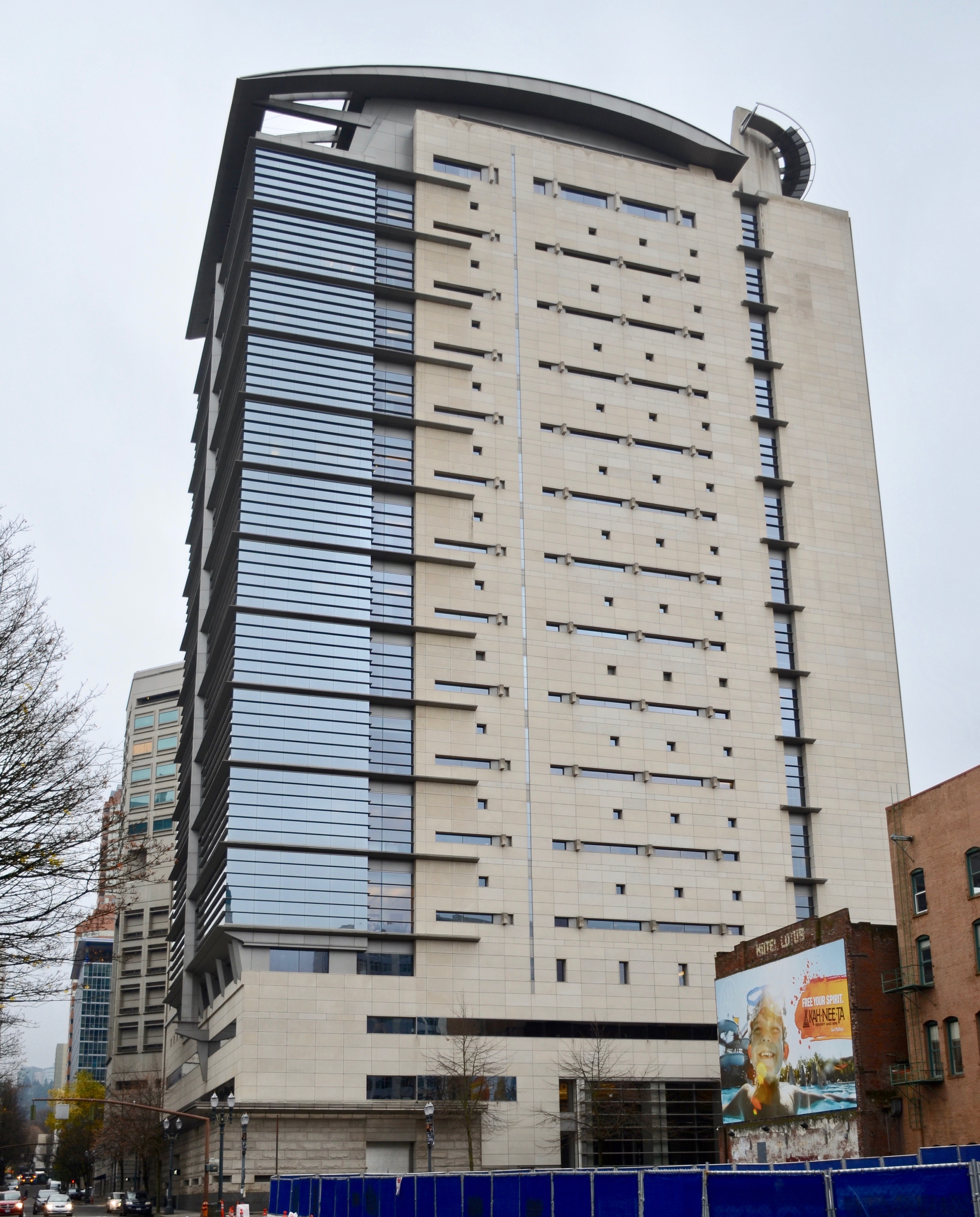
North façade in 2017

The design for the new 565,300-square-foot (52,520 m^{2}) courthouse building is a creative, responsive and efficient solution to placing a large, complex program on a small 195' x 200' site in an important civic setting. BOORA Architects and Kohn Pedersen Fox Associates separated the sleek limestone, steel, aluminum, and glass courthouse into two distinct volumes.

An eight-story block, scaled to the height of the neighboring county courthouse building, incorporates administration offices and a law library with a roof terrace atop the 8th floor. Below the eight-story block are two levels of below-grade parking, building service areas, and storage space built out to the edge of the perimeter sidewalks. Behind the eight-story block, a 17-story tower contains two courtrooms per floor - each with a jury suite and judge's chambers - separated by a zone of services and circulation. Secure corridors wrap the north, south and east sides of the courtrooms, with punched windows that admit daylight into both jury suites and courts. The two courtroom per floor scheme results in an extremely efficient floor plan that maintains separate public, restricted, and secure circulation systems. The courthouse building completes Portland's "Government Center" facing three historic park blocks.

The building site is bounded by Third Avenue to the west, Main Street to the south, Second Avenue to the east and Salmon Street to the north. The building sits on a rusticated stone base referencing Italianate palazzo design. The building sits on a black granite base. Immediately atop the granite is a rough-faced limestone veneer. The remainder of the building is clad with smooth limestone or steel/aluminum and glass curtain walls. A curved elevator tower punctuates the northwest corner of the building like a campanile. The building is capped by a vaulted metal roof canopy.

The building's main entrance is located on its west elevation. The glass and steel storefront entrance is recessed at an angle from the plane of the elevation behind a row of massive pillars and is sheltered under a projecting metal canopy. The exterior wall surfaces of the eight-story block (southern half of the elevation) above the canopy is smooth limestone veneer with punched window openings, one such being a five-story opening which constitutes virtually half of the wall surface. It is divided into four bays by vertical metal fins which terminate as flagpoles or decorative poles and horizontally by metal spandrels and mullions. The top floor of the eight-story block contains the law library. Its west elevation is fully glazed and recessed from the plane of the elevation and set under another projecting metal canopy. An open-air rooftop terrace caps the eight-story block. The northern half of the west elevation above the main entrance canopy consists of the 16-story smooth limestone and glass and steel curtain wall tower. The northwest corner is a solid limestone shaft. A curved elevator penthouse with projecting metal skirt rises above the shaft like a campanile. The curtain wall portion follows the same recessed angle back from the plane of the elevation as the main entrance. The curtain wall is divided horizontally by projecting fins at the floor plates and intermediate window mullions.

The same materials and similar details continue around to the south elevation. The employees entrance is located near the center of the first floor. The eight-story block of the south elevation features a wide, vertical band of windows near its west end and a punched four-story window opening which constitutes nearly two-thirds of the elevation's wall surface. The windows are divided horizontally by metal spandrels and mullions. The top floor of the eight-story block is fully glazed and sheltered under a projecting metal canopy. A four-story metal bracket appears to support the cantilevered canopy. The 16-story tower is set back from the plane of the eight-story block, allowing for the open-air rooftop terrace. The tower's elevation consists of a limestone center shaft flanked by glass and steel curtain walls. The limestone wall surface has punched window openings of horizontal bands and small squares. The curtain walls are divided horizontally by projecting fins at the floor plates and intermediate window mullions. The vaulted metal roof crowns the tower.

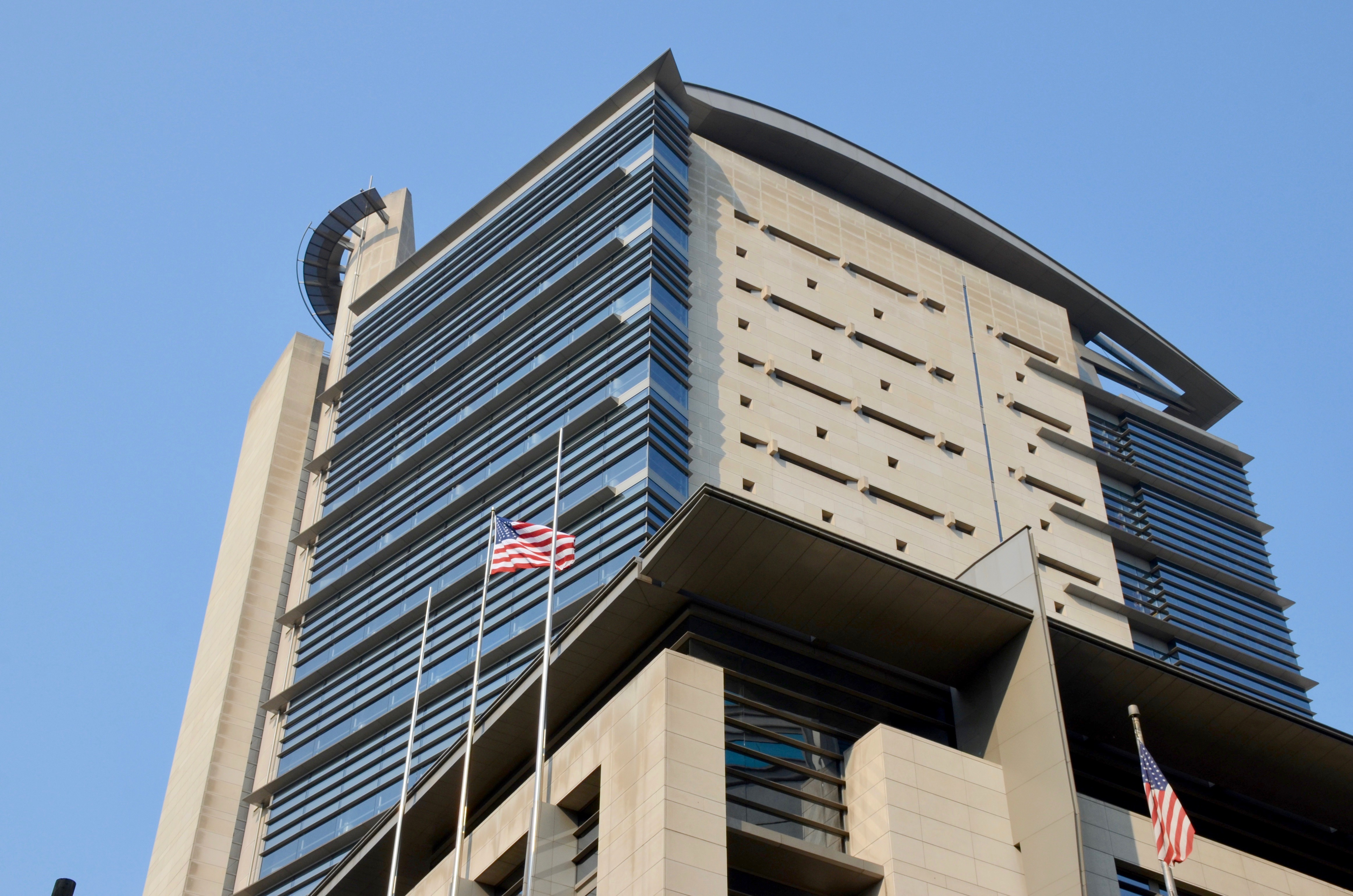
The building's upper portion, from the southwest

The east elevation contains the building's vehicular and service entrances. The overhead garage doors are sheltered under a wide projecting metal canopy which stretches the length of the elevation. The next two floor levels are clad with smooth limestone and contain long horizontal bands of windows. At the fourth floor level, the elevation changes character. The southern half, the 16-story tower, consists of a projecting glass and steel curtain wall that appears to be supported by projecting metal brackets. The curtain wall is divided horizontally by the same projecting fins at the floor plates and intermediate window mullions. The curtain wall is divided vertically by a central recessed channel. A bracketed vertical metal fin, rising from the 4th through the 15th floors, accentuates this channel. The 16th-floor level is set back from the plane of the elevation, creating another open-air rooftop terrace covered by an open canopy which is an extension of the building's vaulted metal roof.

The north elevation contains two-story window openings at its base, allowing natural light into the public lobby. The majority of this elevation is smooth limestone veneer with punched window openings. The projecting glass and steel curtain wall accents the northeast corner, and the solid limestone shaft with curved elevator penthouse accents the northwest corner. The building's vaulted metal roof crowns the tower.

Quotations about the law are incised around the outside ground level of the courthouse, and in various locations on the courtroom floors. A famous quotation by Wendell Phillips, "The first duty of society is justice," is in the public lobby.

Interior of one of the building's courtrooms

The courthouse incorporates extensive security measures using building design, technology, and personnel. The building provides three independent and separate circulation systems to protect court participants. Separate elevators and corridors are provided for the public, for persons in custody, and for court personnel. These circulation paths meet in the courtrooms. Extensive electronic technology includes video cameras, electronic locks, duress alarms, X-ray, and magnetometers. Architecturally significant interior spaces include the two-story main entrance lobby with marble stair and cascading water features, upper-floor court lobbies with semi-circular elevator lobbies, finely detailed wood-paneled courtrooms and hearing rooms, and the aforementioned rooftop terraces.

== See also ==
- Architecture of Portland, Oregon
- List of tallest buildings in Portland, Oregon
