= Gus J. Solomon =

American judge (1906–1987)

Gus Jerome Solomon

Senior Judge of the United States District Court for the District of Oregon
- In office September 1, 1971 – February 15, 1987

Chief Judge of the United States District Court for the District of Oregon
- In office 1958–1971
- Preceded by: Claude C. McColloch
- Succeeded by: Robert C. Belloni

Judge of the United States District Court for the District of Oregon
- In office October 21, 1949 – September 1, 1971
- Appointed by: Harry S. Truman
- Preceded by: Seat established by 63 Stat. 493
- Succeeded by: James M. Burns

Personal details
- Born: Gus Jerome Solomon; August 29, 1906 Portland, Oregon
- Died: February 15, 1987 (aged 80)
- Education: University of Chicago (Ph.B.); Stanford Law School (LL.B.)

Gus Jerome Solomon (August 29, 1906 – February 15, 1987) was a United States district judge of the United States District Court for the District of Oregon.

== Education and career ==
Born in Portland, Oregon, Solomon was the child of immigrant Jewish parents, his father having been born in Romania and his mother in Russia. Solomon received a Bachelor of Philosophy degree from the University of Chicago in 1926 and a Bachelor of Laws from Stanford Law School in 1929. He was in private practice in Portland from 1929 to 1949, first individually and then in partnership with Raymond M. Kell. The Portland law firm of Kell, Alterman & Runstein traces its origin to his practice.

== Federal judicial service ==
On October 21, 1949, Solomon received a recess appointment from President Harry S. Truman to a new seat on the United States District Court for the District of Oregon created by 63 Stat. 493. Formally nominated to the same seat by President Truman on January 5, 1950, he was confirmed by the United States Senate on June 27, 1950, and received his commission on July 5, 1950. He served as Chief Judge from 1958 to 1971 and as a member of the Judicial Conference of the United States from 1963 to 1965, assuming senior status on September 1, 1971, and serving in that capacity until his death on February 15, 1987.

== Honor ==
The Gus J. Solomon United States Courthouse was named in his honor.

== See also ==
- List of Jewish American jurists

== Sources ==
Legal offices
Preceded by Seat established by 63 Stat. 493	Judge of the United States District Court for the District of Oregon; 1949–1971	Succeeded by James M. Burns
Preceded by Claude C. McColloch	Chief Judge of the United States District Court for the District of Oregon; 1958–1971	Succeeded by Robert C. Belloni
