= Pioneer Courthouse =

Historic building in Portland, Oregon, U.S.

- U.S. National Register of Historic Places
- U.S. National Historic Landmark
- Portland Historic Landmark
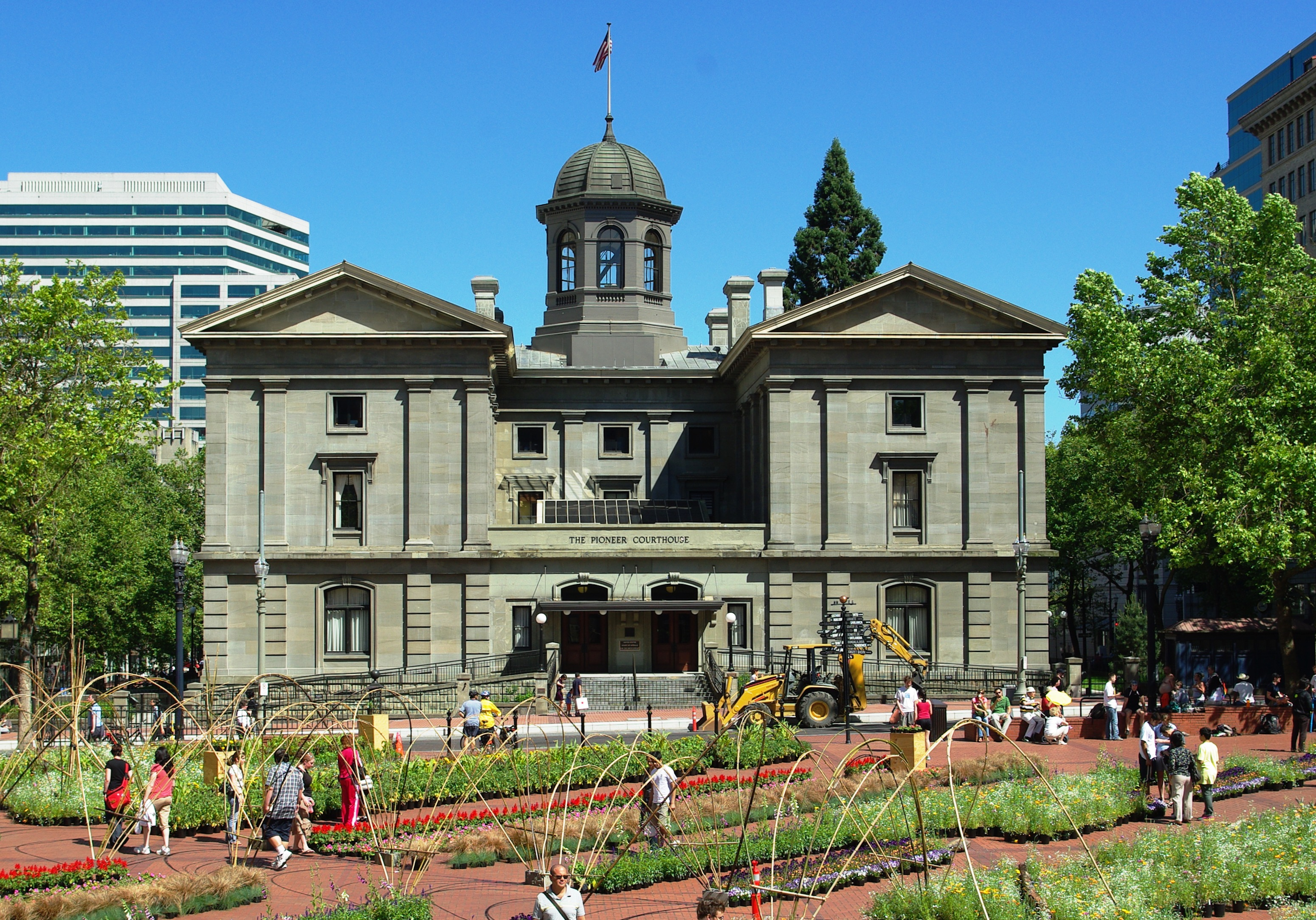
- The Pioneer Courthouse as viewed from Pioneer Courthouse Square after 2005 renovations.

- Location within Portland, Oregon Location within Oregon Location within the United States
- Location: 700 SW 6th Avenue; Portland, Oregon
- Coordinates: 45°31′07″N 122°40′42″W
- Built: 1869
- Architect: Alfred B. Mullett
- Architectural style: Italianate
- NRHP reference No.: 73001582

Significant dates
- Added to NRHP: March 20, 1973
- Designated NHL: May 5, 1977

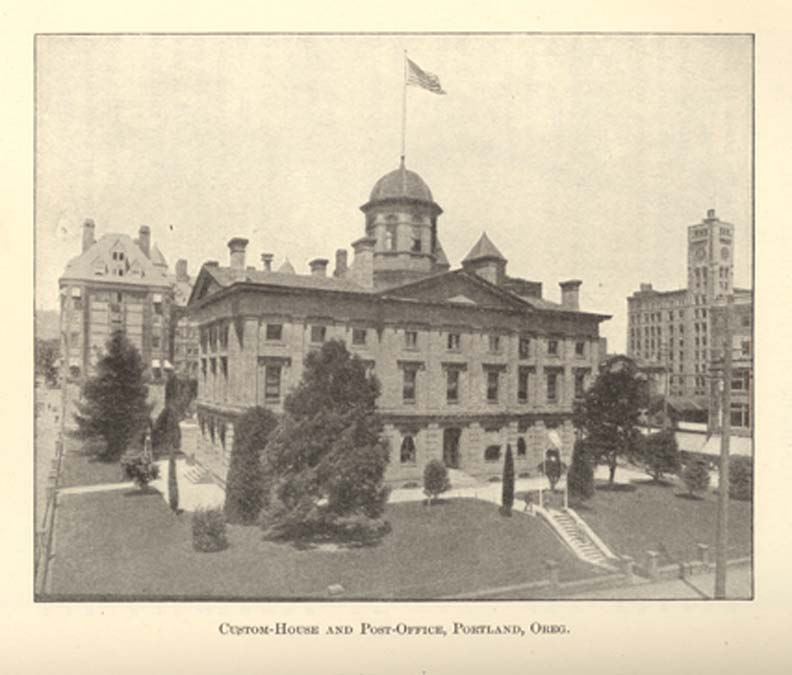
The Pioneer Courthouse (Custom House and Post Office) in 1901

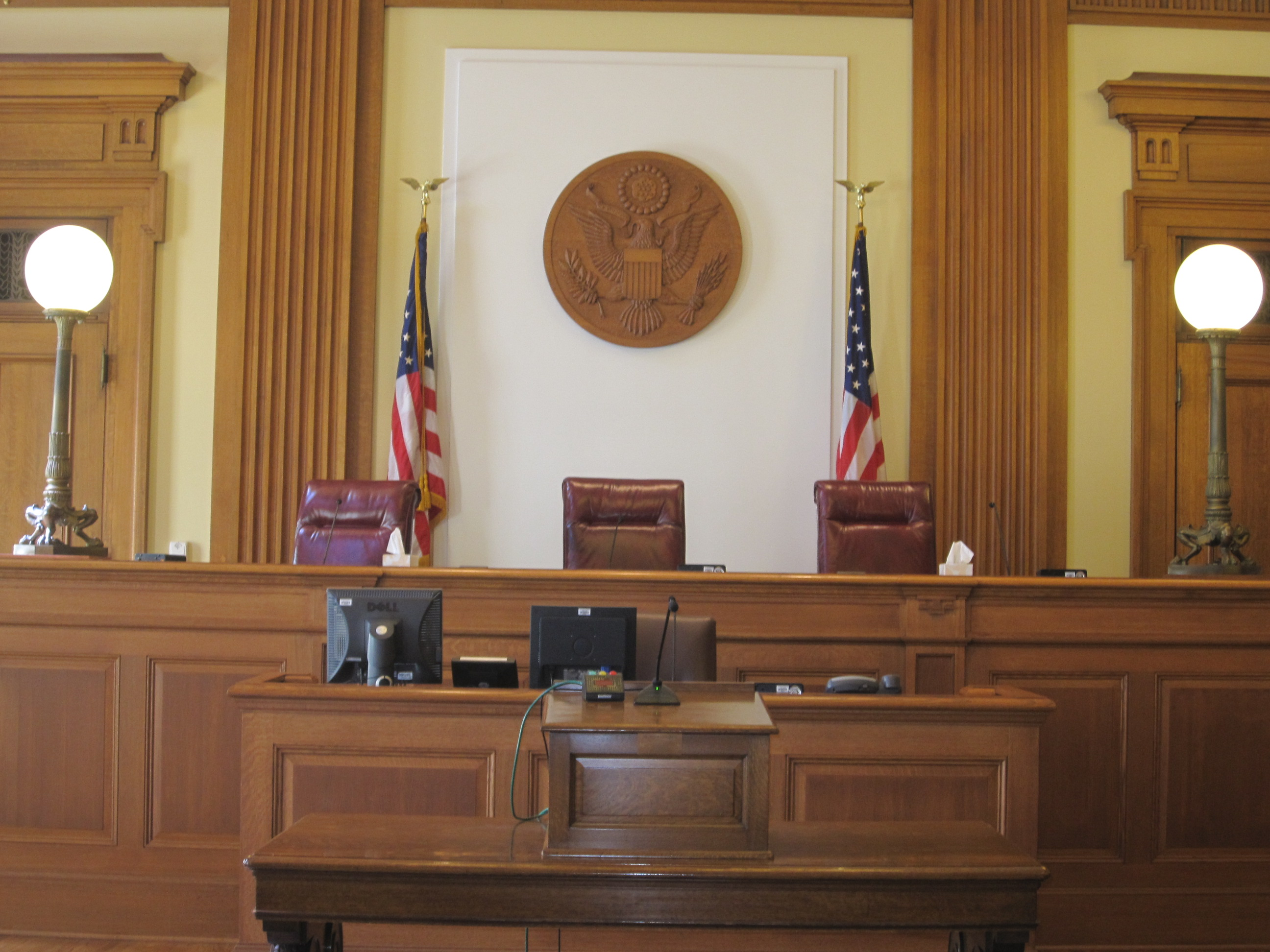
Interior

The Pioneer Courthouse is a federal courthouse in Portland, Oregon, United States. Built beginning in 1869, the structure is the oldest federal building in the Pacific Northwest, and the second-oldest west of the Mississippi River. Along with Pioneer Courthouse Square, it serves as the center of downtown Portland. It is also known as the Pioneer Post Office because a popular downtown Portland post office was, until 2005, located inside. The courthouse is one of four primary locations where the United States Court of Appeals for the Ninth Circuit hears oral arguments. It also houses the chambers of the Portland-based judges on the Ninth Circuit.

== History ==
Built in stages between 1869 and 1903, it was first occupied in 1875 by judge Matthew Deady. At that time, the building was named the United States Building. Pioneer Courthouse has survived several attempts to demolish it, while continuing to function as a federal facility. On March 20, 1973, the building was placed on the National Register of Historic Places. It was declared a National Historic Landmark in 1977.

In March 1933, city engineer Olaf Laurgaard proposed tearing down the building to open a parking garage. John C. Ainsworth asked Oregon representative Charles Martin and Charles L. McNary to see if President Franklin D. Roosevelt would consider giving the structure and property to the city of Portland. Portland would then renovate the structure for the Oregon Historical Society and The Colonial Dames of America to use. Martin immediately replied that the timing was bad since Oregon was asking for funding of the Bonneville Dam, and it was likely illegal to donate a post office to a city. Ainsworth quickly came up with a new scheme: demolish the Pioneer Courthouse and build an office building for the Historical Society, the Boy Scouts, a theater, and a museum. A. E. Doyle, his architectural firm, the local chapter of the American Institute of Architects, the Colonial Dames, and The Oregon Journal sharply opposed destroying the building.

In 2003, plans for renovating the courthouse sparked an unusual conflict between Portland Democratic congressmen Earl Blumenauer and David Wu. Wu, whose district contained the courthouse, supported a plan that included removing the post office from the courthouse, and adding five parking spaces in its basement. Wu's plan was ultimately adopted, and the $23.4 million renovation of the building was completed in December 2005. The work included the addition of base isolators to protect the historic structure from earthquakes, the secure judges' parking area under the building, and the renovation of the lobby where the post office had been.

== Notable trials ==
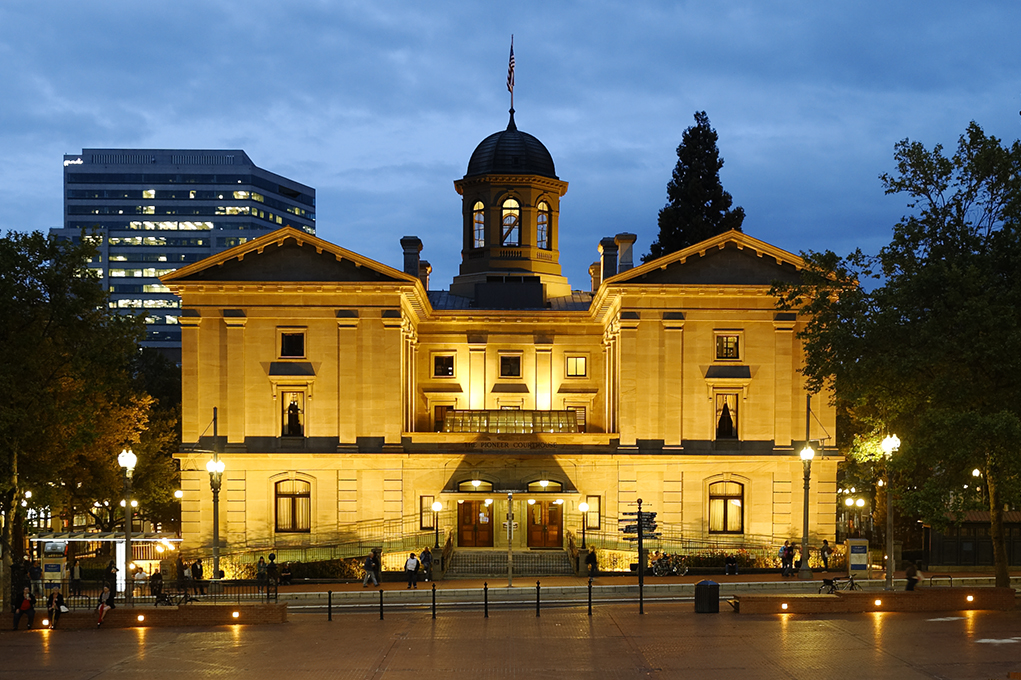
The Pioneer Courthouse at dusk in 2013

The trials of the Oregon land fraud scandal were held in the courthouse, beginning in 1904. These trials were documented at length in Stephen A. Douglas Puter's book Looters of the Public Domain.

== See also ==
- List of the oldest buildings in the United States
- Mark O. Hatfield United States Courthouse – Federal courthouse in Portland, Oregon, U.S.
- National Historic Landmarks in Oregon
- National Register of Historic Places listings in South and Southwest Portland, Oregon
- Old Courthouse (St. Louis)
- Pioneer Courthouse Square – Public space in Portland, Oregon, U.S.
