= List of Phi Delta Delta chapters =

Phi Delta Delta was a women's professional law fraternity founded in 1911 at the University of Southern California. It merged with Phi Alpha Delta in 1972.

== Collegiate chapters ==
Following is a list of Phi Delta Delta collegiate chapters. Status is as of the time of the merger in 1972. All chapters are now inactive, most having merged into Phi Alpha Delta.

Chapter	Charter date and range	Institution	Location	Status	Ref.
Alpha	November 11, 1911	University of Southern California	Los Angeles, California	Active	
Beta	April 17, 1913	Washington College of Law	Washington, D.C.	Active	
Gamma	April 1913 – 19xx ?	Chicago-Kent College of Law	Chicago, Illinois	Inactive	(Note: Gamma chapter's charter was revoked because of dissension in the group.)
Delta	February 1, 1914 – 19xx ?; February 22, 1930	University of Oregon School of Law	Eugene, Oregon	Active	(Note: Delta chapter went inactive for a period due to a lack of female law students.)
Epsilon	February 10, 1917	University of Washington School of Law	Seattle, Washington	Active	
Zeta	February 15, 1918	George Washington University Law School	Washington, D.C.	Active	
Eta	January 24, 1920	New England School of Law	Boston, Massachusetts	Active	
Theta	December 13, 1920	University of Kansas School of Law	Lawrence, Kansas	Active	
Iota	May 19, 1921	Vanderbilt University Law School	Nashville, Tennessee.	Active	
Kappa	May 21, 1921	Washburn University School of Law	Topeka, Kansas	Active	
Lambda	May 23, 1921	University of Pittsburgh School of Law	Pittsburgh, Pennsylvania	Active	
Mu	January 21, 1922	University of Missouri School of Law	Columbia, Missouri	Active	
Nu	May 7, 1922	Brooklyn Law School	Brooklyn, New York City, New York	Active	
Xi	May 20, 1922	Northwestern College of Law	Portland, Oregon	Active	
Omicron	May 18, 1923	Dickinson School of Law	Carlisle, Pennsylvania	Active	
Pi	May 19, 1923	Case Western Reserve University School of Law	Cleveland, Ohio	Active	
Rho	May 27, 1923	Stetson University College of Law	Gulfport, Florida	Active	
Sigma	September 22, 1923	University at Buffalo Law School	Amherst, New York	Active	
Tau	May 3, 1924	Temple University Law School	Philadelphia, Pennsylvania	Active	
Upsilon	May 29, 1924	Willamette University College of Law	Salem, Oregon	Active	
Phi	May 28, 1924	University of Colorado Law School	Boulder, Colorado	Active	
Chi	September 30, 1924	Duquesne University School of Law	Pittsburgh, Pennsylvania	Active	
Psi	May 3, 1925	Kansas City School of Law	Kansas City, Missouri	Active	
Omega	January 30, 1926 – 1945	Vancouver Law School	Vancouver, British Columbia, Canada	Inactive	(Note: Omega chapter closed when the Vancouver Law School merged with the University of British Columbia.)
Alpha Alpha	February 28, 1926	Fordham University School of Law	Manhattan, New York City, New York	Active	
Alpha Beta	March 19, 1927	University of Cincinnati College of Law	Cincinnati, Ohio	Active	
Alpha Gamma	May 1, 1927	New York University School of Law	Manhattan, New York City, New York	Active	
Alpha Delta	March 19, 1927	University of Maryland School of Law	Baltimore, Maryland	Active	
Alpha Epsilon	October 23, 1927 – October 3, 1959	Minnesota College of Law	Saint Paul, Minnesota	Merged	(Note: Alpha Epsilon chapter merged into Alpha Epsilon Psi chapter when its institution merged.)
Alpha Zeta	October 26, 1927	Loyola University New Orleans College of Law	New Orleans, Louisiana	Active	
Alpha Eta	October 29, 1927	University of South Dakota School of Law	Vermillion, South Dakota	Active	
Alpha Theta	February 18, 1928	Loyola Law School	Los Angeles, California	Active	
Alpha Iota	May 12, 1928	University of Louisville School of Law	Louisville, Kentucky	Active	
Alpha Kappa	May 12, 1928	University of Detroit Law School	Downtown Detroit, Michigan	Active	
Alpha Lambda	July 1, 1928 – December 12, 1955	National University School of Law	Washington, D.C.	Merged	(Note: The Alpha Lambda chapter ceased to exist when the National University School of Law merged with George Washington University School of Law; members were invited to affiliate with the Zeta chapter there.)
Alpha Mu	May 4, 1929	Columbia Law School	New York City, New York	Active	
Alpha Nu	October 5, 1929	Cleveland Law School	Cleveland, Ohio	Active	
Alpha Xi	October 12, 1929	Indiana Law School	Indianapolis, Indiana	Active	
Alpha Omicron	June 8, 1929	Tulsa Law School	Tulsa, Oklahoma	Active	
Alpha Pi	December 7, 1929	University of Utah College of Law	Salt Lake City, Utah	Active	
Alpha Rho	November 11, 1929	St. John's University School of Law	Jamaica, New York City, New York	Active	
Alpha Sigma	May 10, 1930	University of Michigan Law School	Ann Arbor, Michigan	Active	
Alpha Tau	August 27, 1930	Yale Law School	New Haven, Connecticut	Active	
Alpha Upsilon	November 9, 1930	Saint Louis University School of Law	St. Louis, Missouri	Active	
Alpha Phi	March 8, 1931	University of Miami School of Law	Coral Gables, Florida.	Active	
Alpha Chi	October 24, 1931	University of Memphis Law School	Memphis, Tennessee	Active	
Alpha Psi	July 24, 1931 – October 3, 1959	St. Paul College of Law	Saint Paul, Minnesota	Merged	(Note: Alpha Psi chapter merger into Alpha Epsilon Psi chapter when its institution merged.)
Alpha Omega	March 19, 1932	Louisiana State University School of Law	Baton Rouge, Louisiana	Active	(Note: Five female students at LSU formed the co-ed law club, Queen's Counselors, in the fall of 1930. This group was absorbed by Phi Delta Delta in March 1932.)
Beta Alpha	October 9, 1932	Southwestern University School of Law	Mid-Wilshire, Los Angeles, California	Active	
Beta Beta	April 12, 1933	University of California at Berkeley School of Law	Berkeley, California	Active	
Beta Gamma	July 11, 1936	University of Mississippi School of Law	Oxford, Mississippi	Active	
Beta Delta	May 15, 1937	Stanford Law School	Stanford, California	Active	
Beta Epsilon	October 15, 1946	Columbus School of Law	Washington, D.C.	Active	
Beta Zeta	October 24, 1947	University of Florida School of Law	Gainesville, Florida	Active	
Beta Eta	December 3, 1949	University of Georgia School of Law	Athens, Georgia	Active	
Beta Theta	April 15, 1950	UCLA School of Law	Los Angeles, California	Active	
Beta Iota	April 10, 1954	University of Richmond School of Law	Richmond, Virginia	Active	
Beta Kappa	October 30, 1954	Salmon P. Chase College of Law	Highland Heights, Kentucky	Active	
Beta Lambda	October 8, 1955	Georgetown University School of Law	Washington, D.C.	Active	
Beta Mu	April 11, 1958	University of Alabama School of Law	Tuscaloosa, Alabama	Active	
Alpha Epsilon Psi	October 3, 1959	William Mitchell College of Law	Saint Paul, Minnesota	Active	(Note: Alpha Epsilon Psi chapter. was formed from the merger of Alpha Epsilon and Alpha Psi after their institutions merged.) (Note: When the sorority merged with Phi Alpha Tau, the Minnesota members voted to create their organization, the Minnesota Women Lawyers, instead of merging.)
Beta Nu	February 28, 1964	California Western School of Law	San Diego, California	Active	
Beta Xi	April 24, 1965	University of Akron School of Law	Akron, Ohio	Active	
Beta Omicron	October 15, 1965	University of San Diego School of Law	San Diego, California	Active	
Beta Pi	December 9, 1966	Cumberland School of Law	Homewood, Alabama	Active	
Beta Rho	May 18, 1968	University of Tennessee College of Law	Knoxville, Tennessee	Active	
Beta Sigma	May 1, 1968	New York Law School	Tribeca, New York City, New York	Active	
Beta Tau	June 1, 1968	Florida State University College of Law	Tallahassee, Florida	Active	
Beta Upsilon	May 1969	University of South Dakota School of Law	Vermillion, South Dakota	Active	

== Alumnae chapters ==
Following is a list of Phi Delta Delta alumnae chapters. Status is as of the time of the merger in 1972. All chapters are now inactive, due to the merger with Phi Alpha Delta.

Chapter	Charter date and range	Location	Status	Ref.
Los Angeles Alumnae chapter	March 3, 1922	Los Angeles, California	Active	
Kansas City Alumnae chapter	March 22, 1924 – 194x ?	Kansas City, Kansas	Inactive	(Note: Chapter surrendered its charter and affiliated with its local collegiate chapter to keep the fraternity active at the law school during World War II when few women were studying law.)
Washington Alumnae chapter	January 9, 1925	Washington, D.C.	Active	
San Francisco Alumnae chapter	November 17, 1925	San Francisco, California	Active	
Buffalo Alumnae chapter	September 2, 1927 – 19xx ?	Buffalo, New York	Inactive	
Boston Alumnae chapter	November 11, 1927 – 194x ?	Boston, Massachusetts	Inactive	
New York City Alumnae chapter	November 12, 1927	New York City, New York	Active	
Cincinnati Alumnae chapter	May 12, 1932 – 194x ?	Cincinnati, Ohio	Inactive	
Cleveland Alumnae chapter	March 25, 1934 – 194x ?	Cleveland, Ohio	Inactive	
Santa Barbara-Ventura Alumnae chapter	May 5, 1957	Santa Barbara and Ventura, California	Active	
