= Lucy Somerville Howorth =

American politician

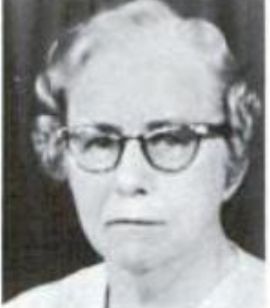
- Lucy Somerville Howorth, from a 1963 publication of the United States federal government
- Born: July 1, 1895; Greenville, Mississippi, U.S.
- Died: August 23, 1997 (aged 102); Cleveland, Mississippi, U.S.
- Occupations: Lawyer, politician, judge
- Spouse: Joseph Marion Howorth (m. 1928-1982; his death)

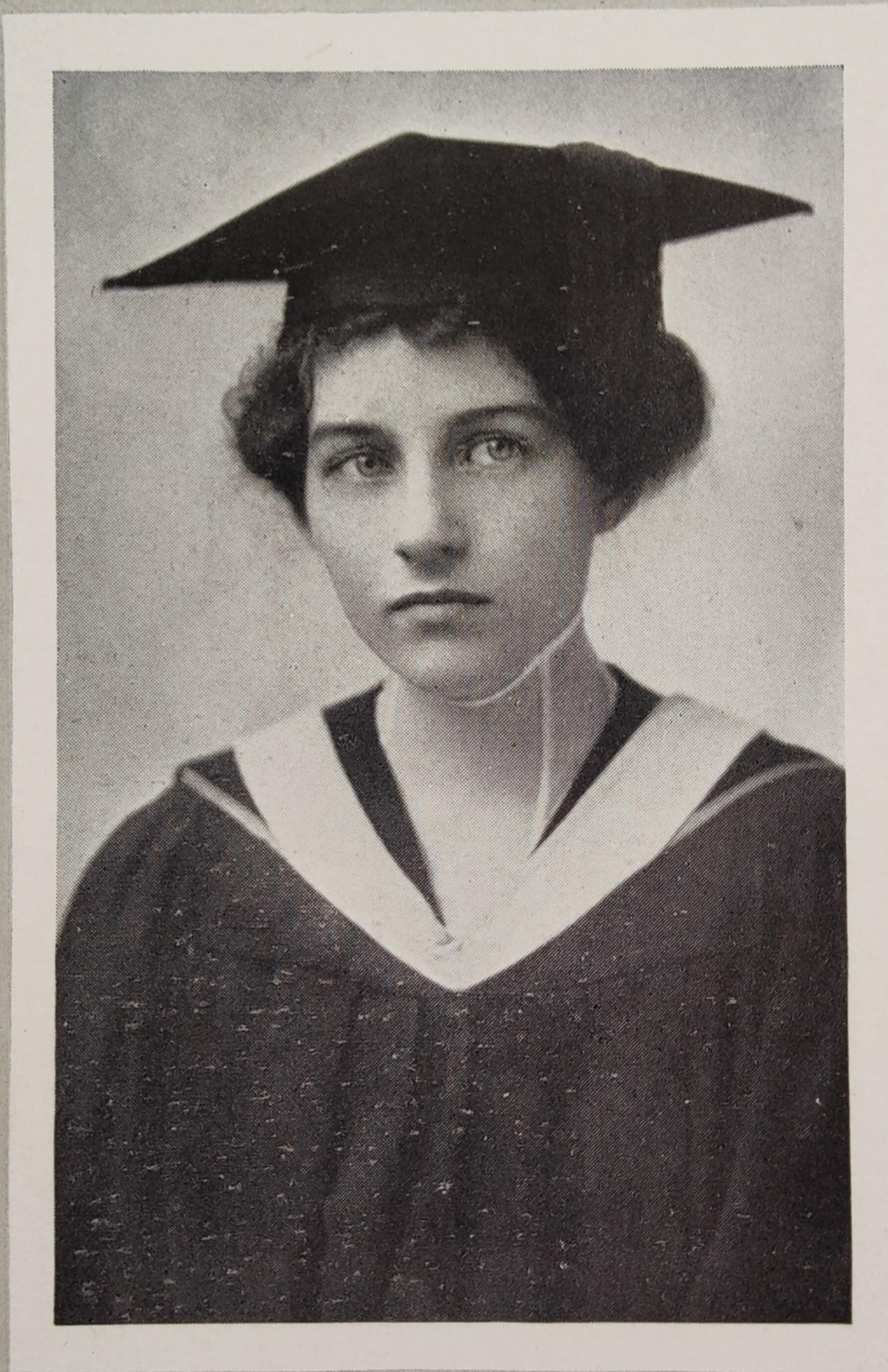
Lucy's yearbook photo

Lucy Somerville Howorth (July 1, 1895 – August 23, 1997) was an American lawyer, feminist and politician. On August 18, 1917, in the State Capitol gallery in Nashville, Tennessee, she witnessed the Nineteenth Amendment to the United States Constitution being ratified, giving women the right to vote. This inspired her lifelong fight for the civil rights of minorities and women. She served in the Mississippi House of Representatives from 1932-1936. She worked on New Deal legislation.

== Early life ==
Lucy Somerville was born on July 1, 1895, in Greenville, Mississippi. The daughter of Nellie Nugent Somerville, nationally known as a temperance and woman suffrage leader and the first woman to serve in the Mississippi Legislature, she was raised in an atmosphere of female equality, a rarity at that time. She attended Randolph-Macon Woman's College, now Randolph College, in Lynchburg, Virginia, (1912–16) where she was a member of Alpha Omicron Pi fraternity, Pi Gamma Mu international honor society and the Phi Beta Kappa society.

After completing her B.A. she continued her education at in 1918 Columbia University as a graduate student in psychology and economics. While living in New York City, she would attend political rallies and meetings; she also regularly visited settlement houses and sweatshops where she first saw how bosses mistreated working women and minorities. These experiences sparked her lifelong interest in civil rights.

From 1920 to 1922, she returned to the South and enrolled in the University of Mississippi Law School (in Oxford, Mississippi), and graduated summa cum laude with a LL.B., one of only two women in her class. While a law student, she started a female basketball team, a writer's group, and a book review column.

== Political life ==
Howorth moved to Cleveland, Mississippi, to begin practicing law. She then moved her law practice to her hometown, Greenville, Mississippi, where she married Joseph M. Howorth, a local lawyer. After five years of practicing law, she was appointed as a judge. She was admitted to Mississippi state and federal courts, the U.S. Supreme Court, and all of the courts in the District of Columbia.

As a Democrat, she served Mississippians as a Hinds County Representative and as a member of the Mississippi House of Representatives from 1932 to 1936. She led the National Federation of Business and Professional Women (BPW). She was program coordinator during the 1937-1939 national BPW presidency of her Mississippi friend, Earlene White, and she represented the BPW at a meeting of the International Federation in Norway in 1939.

Appointed by President Franklin D. Roosevelt, Howorth served on the Board of Veterans Appeals from July 1934 to April 1943. Howorth served on the War Claims Commission, 1949–1954, as associate general counsel, deputy general counsel, and general counsel. After leaving government work in 1954, she moved back to Cleveland, Mississippi, where she practiced law with her husband. In 1961, John F. Kennedy appointed her to his Commission on the Status of Women. She regularly traveled the US and internationally to give speeches and serve on boards that protected and furthered civil rights. She retired from her law practice in 1980 at 85 years old.

== Activism and community involvement ==
In her lifetime Howorth was a member of many organizations including the National Association of Women Lawyers, Phi Delta Delta Legal Fraternity (founded 1911, merged with Phi Alpha Delta in 1972), the Professional Women's Club, and the Daughters of the American Revolution. She served as vice president of the American Association of University Women, and played a role in ending their segregationist practices in the 1940s. She was member and chairman of the United Nations League of Lawyers, and she served as the chairman of the Cleveland Public Library Commission for ten years.

== Later life and legacy ==
Howorth co-edited her grandfather's Civil War letters, which were published under the title, My Dear Nellie (1978). Her husband died in 1982 after 54 years of marriage. She died from heart failure in Cleveland, Mississippi, on August 23, 1997, at the age of 102. The Lucy Somerville Howorth Collection is held at Delta State University and consists of some of her professional and non-professional works, personal correspondences, certificates, awards and other items of memorabilia, photos and artwork, and newspaper clippings, and a scrapbook she and her husband owned. The first biography of Howorth, published in 2006, is titled Lucy Somerville Howorth: New Deal Lawyer, Politician, and Feminist from the South and is by Dorothy S. Shawhan and Martha H. Swain. The Lucy Somerville Howorth Lecture Series is held at the University of Mississippi, and brings speakers on women's studies to the campus.

Howorth's portrait is part of the Mississippi Hall of Fame located in the Old Capitol Museum to honor her significant contributions to the state of Mississippi.
