= Bullowa =

Bullowa is a surname. Notable people with the name include:

- Emilie Bullowa (1869–1942), American lawyer
- Jesse Bullowa (1879–1943), American medical researcher
