= F. Josephine Stevenson =

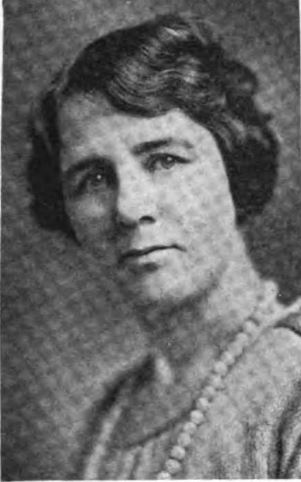
F. Josephine Stevenson

F. Josephine Stevenson was an early 20th-century female attorney and state chairman of Uniform Laws of the National League of Women Voters (1920–1921).

== Early life ==
F. Josephine Stevenson was born in Oil City, Pennsylvania, daughter of Walter R. Stevenson and Mary E. Hunt.

She attended Oil City High School and then the College of Law, University of Southern California, graduating in June 1918. The Legal Lights, a women's law organization at USC, was founded in 1911. It became Phi Delta Delta (merged into Phi Alpha Delta in 1972), the first women’s law sorority in the U.S. In 1918, two of USC's five post-graduate law students were women, with Stevenson one of the two.

== Career ==
Stevenson was admitted to the Bar in 1918; she was an attorney-at-law and specialized in probate work. She served one year as president of the Women Lawyers' Club, and four years as corresponding secretary.

She was state chairman of Uniform Laws of the National League of Women Voters (1920–1921).

Stevenson was former president of Pasadena Business and Professional Women's Club. For one year, she was state organization chairman of the State Federation of Business and Professional Women's Clubs.

She was a member of the State and County Bar Associations, the Kappa Beta Phi (national legal sorority) and the Woman's Civic League of Pasadena.

In 1922, Stevenson published Legal Status of Women (California Civic League of Women Voters): a study of the legal status of women in California and presenting to women a plain exposition of the laws effecting their rights. Sixteen pages written in simple English dealing with separate and community property rights; obligation of parents to children; marriage and divorce laws; family support; testimony and contracts; public education; office holding; jury service; legal disability and protective legislation.

== Personal life ==
Stevenson moved to California in 1894. In 1922, she lived at 43 North El Molino Avenue and in 1928 at 3817 E. California St., Pasadena, California.
