= Women in the United States judiciary =

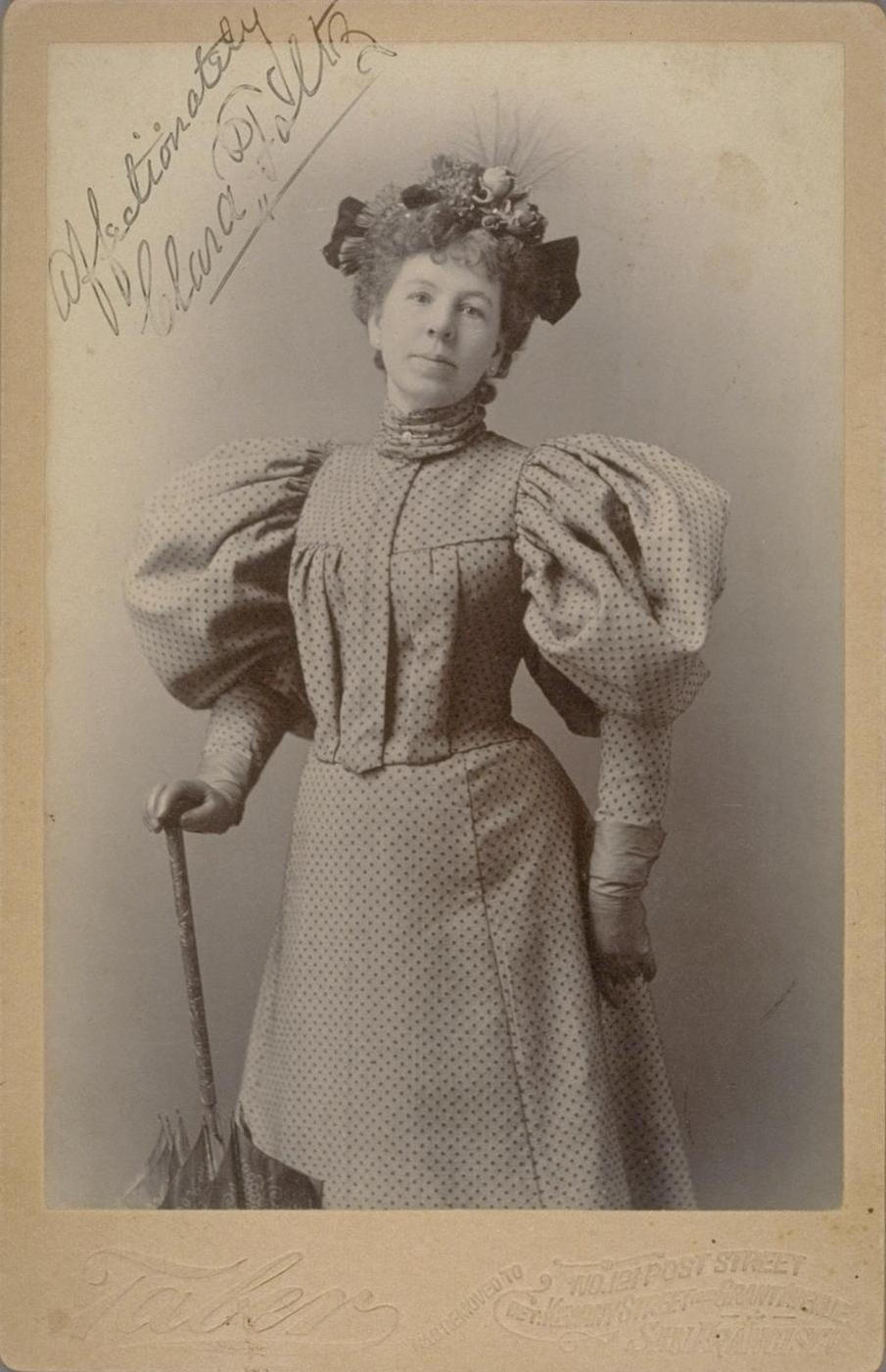
Clara Shortridge Foltz circa 1906, the first female lawyer admitted to the California State Bar

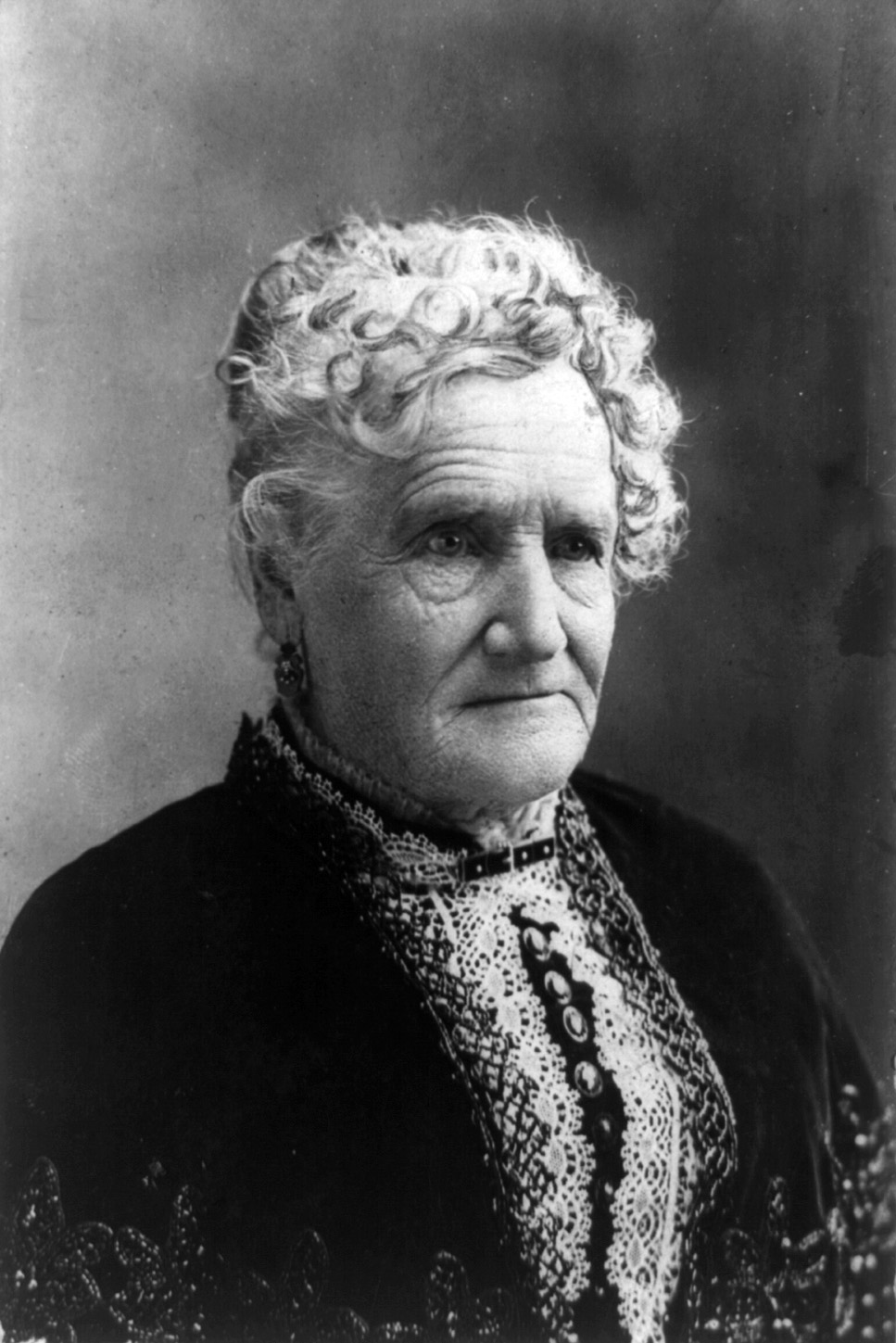
Esther Hobart Morris: first woman to serve as a judicial officer in the United States (1870)

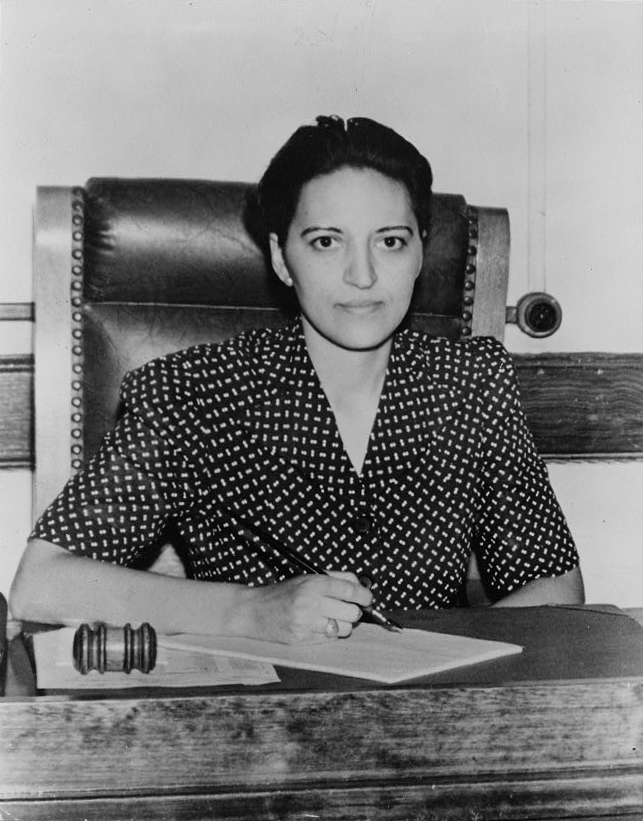
Jane Bolin: First African American female judge in the United States (1939)

The number of women in the United States judiciary has increased as more women have entered law school, but women still face significant barriers in pursuing legal careers.

== History ==
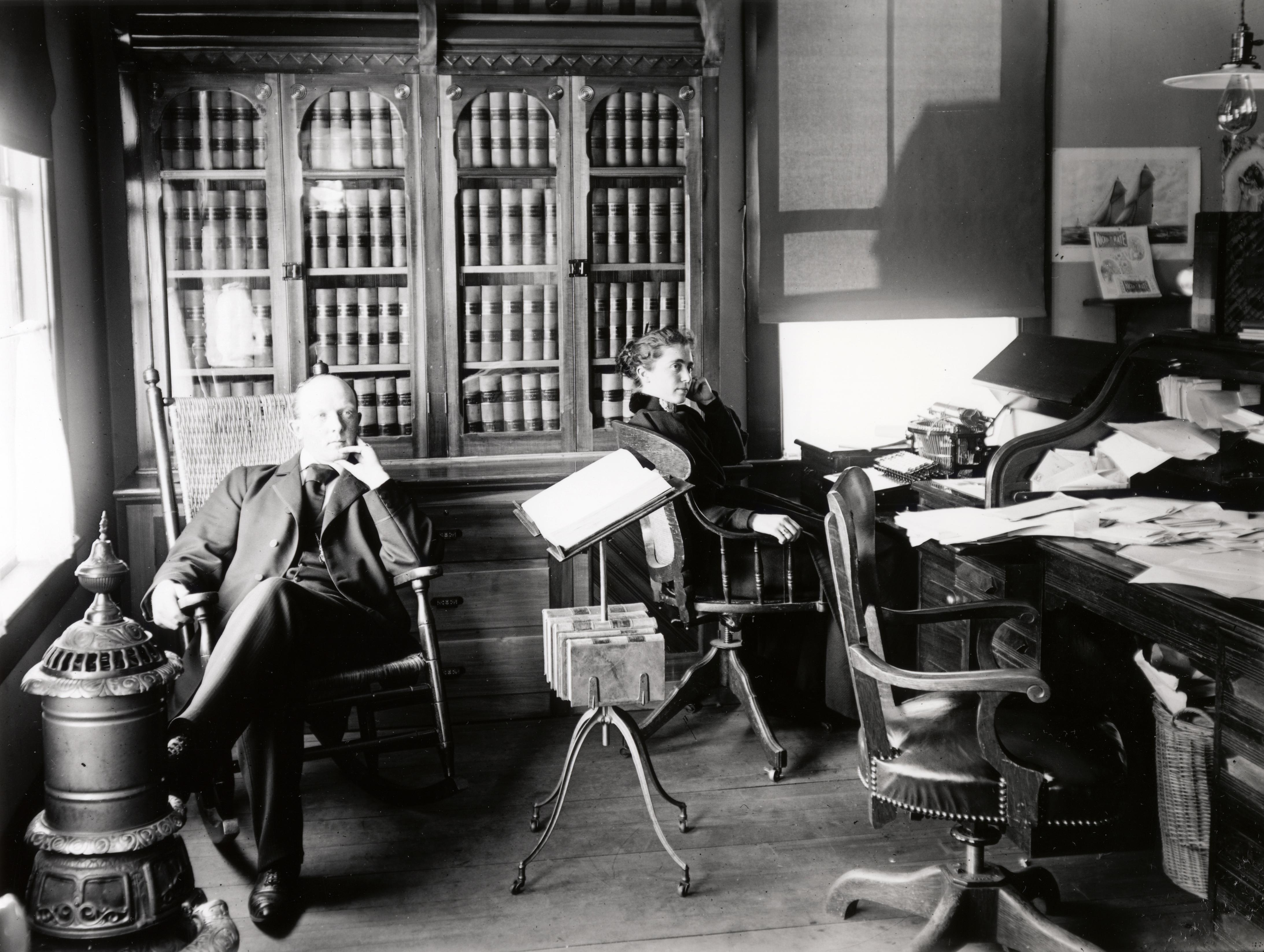
Belle Leavitt, the third woman admitted to Maine Bar Association, 1900, with law partner Fred J. Allen

Women have long faced significant barriers to entering the legal profession in the U.S., and any steps forward were frequently followed by setbacks. For example, in June 1869, the Iowa Supreme Court ruled that Arabella Mansfield could not be denied a chance to take the bar exam because she was a woman. She took the exam and passed, becoming the first licensed female lawyer in the United States. However, just 6 years later, in 1875, the Wisconsin Supreme Court denied Lavinia Goodell admission to the state bar on the grounds that "[n]ature has tempered woman as little for the juridical conflicts of the court room, as for the physical conflicts of the battle field. Womanhood is moulded [sic] for gentler and better things."

In 1872, the United States Supreme Court affirmed a decision from the Supreme Court of Illinois that denied Myra Bradwell admission to the state bar. The state Supreme Court had reasoned that because state law invalidated any contract entered into by a married woman without the consent of her husband, women (most of whom would be married) could not adequately represent their clients. The U.S. Supreme Court affirmed, noting that even though some women might not actually be married, such women were the rare exceptions. The U.S. Supreme Court noted:

The paramount destiny and mission of woman are to fulfil the noble and benign offices of wife and mother. This is the law of the Creator. And the rules of civil society must be adapted to the general constitution of things, and cannot be based upon exceptional cases.

— Bradwell v. Illinois, 83 U.S. 130, 141-42 (1873).

Also in 1872, the Utah Bar admitted its first two women, Phoebe Couzins and Georgianna Snow.

In Washington, D.C., Belva Ann Lockwood lobbied Congress on three separate occasions to change the U.S. Supreme Court admissions rules to allow a woman to argue before the court. Her efforts succeeded. Lockwood was sworn in as the first woman member of the U.S. Supreme Court bar on March 3, 1879. Late in 1880, she became the first woman lawyer to argue a case before the U.S. Supreme Court.

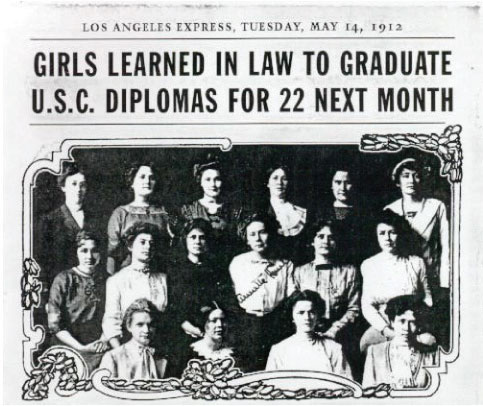
Georgia Bullock's graduating law school class, 1912

Mary Bartelme was appointed assistant judge in Cook County, Illinois in 1913, where she presided over court cases involving juveniles and was referred to at that time as, "America's only woman judge", by The New York Times. In 1914, Georgia Bullock was appointed the "woman judge" of Los Angeles, in charge of a court segregated by sex where "she would serve as a model of Victorian ideals of womanhood for female misdemeanants".

Ratified in 1920, the Nineteenth Amendment granted women the right to vote. During this time, women began assuming judgeships, through both appointment and election. One such woman was Mary O'Toole, who became the first woman municipal judge of the United States, when she was appointed Judge of the Municipal Court of Washington, D.C. by President Harding in 1921.

Barring women from practicing law was prohibited in the U.S. in 1971. In 1975, Julia Cooper Mack was appointed to the D.C. Court of Appeals, making her the first woman of color, and only the eighth woman total, to be appointed to a court of last resort. By 1993, 60 women had served on the highest court in forty states, the District, and the federal courts. As of 2001, women filled 26.3% of the judgeships on state courts of last resort, 19.2% of federal district court judgeships, 20.1% of federal appellate judgeships, and as of 2018, 33.3% of the U.S. Supreme Court.

In 1981, Sandra Day O'Connor was the first woman appointed to the U.S. Supreme Court. She received unanimous Senate approval. Justice Sandra Day O'Connor, commenting on women pursuing careers, observed that "women professionals still have primary responsibility for the children and the housekeeping, spending roughly twice as much time on these cares as do their professional husbands."

In 1992, the United States Court of Appeals for the Sixth Circuit convened the first federal all-female three-judge panel, composed of Sixth Circuit judges Alice M. Batchelder and Cornelia Groefsema Kennedy, alongside the Eastern District of Michigan's Anna Diggs Taylor, sitting by designation. On the global scale, Joan Donoghue is the first American female to serve as a Judge (2010) and President (2021) of the International Court of Justice.

== Gender bias and barriers to entry in the US courts ==
Since 1992, women's representation in law school classes has approached 50%. And by 2021, women constituted 55% of law students, 45% of law faculty, and 42% of law deans. However, the percentage of female federal judges is fairly lower. As of 2016, only 36% of judges on the federal courts of appeals were women, that is 60 out of 167 active judges. Women represented only 15% of judges on the Third Circuit, only 20% of judges on the Eight Circuit and only 25% of judges on the Tenth Circuit. As for women of color, there is even a smaller number. Only 12 women (7% of judges) of color were on the U.S. courts of appeals.

=== Inappropriate interactions ===
Many of the task forces found both explicit and implicit unacceptable treatment of female lawyers by male judges. For instance, in 1988, a senior status federal district court judge refused to address a female attorney as 'Ms.' and threatened to hold her in contempt if she persisted in using her birth name rather than her married name. Women judges also report hearing more disparaging remarks than male judges do.

== Notable women judges ==
=== State judges ===
- First female justice of the peace: Esther Hobart Morris in 1870
- First elected female justice of the peace: Catherine Waugh McCulloch (1886) in 1907
- First female probate judge: Mary H. Cooper in 1908:
- First female juvenile judge: Mary Bartelme (1894) in 1913
- First female elected judge: Florence E. Allen (1914) in 1920
- First female municipal judge: Mary O'Toole (1914) in 1921
- First female police judge: Julia W. Ker (1912) in 1926
- First African American female: Jane Bolin (1932) in 1939
- First sisters to simultaneously serve as judges: Cornelia Groefsema Kennedy (1947) and Margaret G. Schaeffer (1948)
- First African American female (elected judge): Geraldine Bledsoe Ford in 1966
- First Hispanic American female (county court judge): Dorothy Comstock Riley in 1972
- First African American female (probate court): Edith Jacqueline Ingram Grant in 1973
- First Latino American female: Frances Munoz (1972) in 1978
- First openly lesbian: Abby Soven in 1978
- First Chinese American female: Patricia A. Yim Cowett (1972) in 1979
- First Native American (Ojibwe) female (federal judge): Margaret Treuer (1977) in 1983
- First Filipino American female: Lillian Y. Lim (1977) in 1986
- First Vietnamese American female: Wendy Duong (1984) in 1992
- First Dominican American (female) elected: Faviola Soto (1979) in 1994
- First Muslim American female to preside over an American courtroom: Zakia Mahasa in 1997
- First Indian American female: Rena M. Van Tine (1986) in 2001
- First Hispanic American (female) to preside as an arbitrator on an American television court show: Marilyn Milian in 2001
- First Korean American female: Jeannie Hong (1993) in 2002
- First Muslim American female: Mona K. Majzoub in 2004
- First Colombian American (female): Catalina M. Avalos in 2005
- First Arab American female: Charlene Mekled Elder in 2006
- First Ethiopian American (female): Nina Ashenafi-Richardson in 2008
- First Ecuadorian American (female) elected: Carmen Velasquez in 2009
- First known Pakistani American female: Pamela Leeming in 2009
- First transgender woman: Phyllis Frye (1981) in 2010
- First Egyptian American female elected: Sherrie Mikhail Miday (2001) in 2016
- First Hasidic Jewish American female elected: Rachel Freier (2006) in 2017
- First Hmong American females: Kashoua "Kristy" Yang (2009) and Sophia Y. Vuelo (1999) in 2017
- First Sikh female: Neetu Badhan Smith in 2017
- First Cambodian American (female): Jana Seng in 2018
- First Armenian-born (female): Amy Ashvanian in 2018
- First Indian American female (elected): Juli Mathew in 2018
- First Indonesian American female: Marissa Hutabarat (2010) in 2020
- First Tibetan American (female): Tsering Cornell in 2022
- First Laotian American (female): Chanpone Sinlapasai in 2022
- First hijab-wearing: Nadia Kahf in 2023
- First Sri-Lankan American female: Divani Nadaraja in 2023
- First Afghan American (female): Malalai Farooqi in 2026
- First Yemeni American female: Assma Ali in 2026

==== State Appellate Court ====
- First female: Arleigh M. Woods (1953) in 1980

==== State Supreme Court ====
- First female: Florence E. Allen (1914) in 1922
- First female to serve as chief justice: Lorna E. Lockwood (1925) in 1970
- First Hispanic American female: Dorothy Comstock Riley in 1982
- First Japanese American female: Paula A. Nakayama in 1993
- First African American female to serve as chief justice: Leah Ward Sears (1980) in 2005
- First openly lesbian: Virginia Linder (1980) in 2007
- First openly lesbian to serve as chief justice: Maite Oronoz Rodríguez (2001) in 2016
- First Native American (female): Anne McKeig in 2016
- First Armenian American female: Gabrielle Wolohojian in 2024

=== Federal judges ===
- First female (federal judge): Kathryn Sellers (1911) in 1918
- First female Article III federal judge: Florence E. Allen in 1934
- First African American female (federal judge): Constance Baker Motley (1946) in 1966
- First Italian American female (federal judge): Veronica DiCarlo Wicker
- First African American female (court of last resort): Julia Cooper Mack (1951) in 1975
- First Mexican American female (federal judge): Irma Elsa Gonzalez (1973) in 1984
- First Guatemalan American female (federal judge): Lourdes Baird in 1992
- First Asian American female (federal judge): Marilyn Go in 1993
- First openly lesbian African American (federal judge): Deborah Batts (1972) in 1994
- First Cuban American female (federal judge): Cecilia Altonaga (1983) in 2003
- First Chinese American female (federal judge): Dolly M. Gee (1984) in 2010
- First Korean American female (federal judge): Lucy H. Koh (1993) in 2010
- First South Asian female (federal judge): Cathy Bissoon (1993) in 2011
- First Filipino American female (federal judge): Lorna G. Schofield (1981) in 2012
- First Afro-Caribbean-born (female): Margo Kitsy Brodie in 2012
- First openly lesbian Asian American (federal judge): Pamela K. Chen (1986) in 2013
- First openly lesbian Latino American (federal judge): Nitza Quiñones Alejandro (1975) in 2013
- First Native American (Hopi) female (federal judge): Diane Humetewa (1993) in 2014
- First Indian American (female) federal judge: Alka Sagar in 2014
- First Assyrian American (female) (federal judge): Hala Y. Jarbou in 2020
- First Greek American female (federal judge): Eleni M. Roumel in 2020
- First Navajo Nation (female) (federal judge): Sunshine Sykes in 2022
- First Muslim American female and Bangladeshi American [female] (federal judge): Nusrat Choudhury in 2023
- First Native Hawaiian female: Shanlyn A.S. Park in 2023

==== U.S. Bankruptcy Court ====
- First female Referee in Bankruptcy: Florence Olson in 1898
- First African American female: Bernice B. Donald in 1988

==== U.S. District Court ====
- First female: Burnita Shelton Matthews (1919) in 1949
- First Puerto Rican American female: Carmen Consuelo Cerezo (1969) in 1980
- First Asian American female: Susan Oki Mollway (1981) in 1988

==== U.S. Magistrate ====
- First African American female (chief magistrate): Joyce London Alexander (1972) in 1979

==== U.S. Circuit Court (Intermediate Appellate Courts) ====
- First female: Florence E. Allen (1914) in 1934
- First African American female: Amalya Lyle Kearse (c. 1960s) in 1979
- First Hispanic American female: Kim McLane Wardlaw (1979) in 1998
- First openly lesbian African American (Seventh Circuit): Staci Michelle Yandle (1987) in 2014
- First Vietnamese American and Asian-Pacific female: Jacqueline Nguyen (1991) in 2012
- First South Asian female (federal court of appeals): Neomi Rao in 2019
- First African American (female) (U.S. Court of Appeals for the Federal Circuit): Tiffany P. Cunningham in 2021
- First former federal (female) public defender to serve as a U.S. Circuit Judge: Candace Jackson-Akiwumi in 2021
- First federal (female) public defender to serve as a U.S. Circuit Judge: Eunice C. Lee in 2021
- First openly lesbian: Beth Robinson (1989) in 2021
- First African American female (United States Court of Appeals for the Fifth Circuit): Dana Douglas in 2022
- First African American female (United States Court of Appeals for the Third Circuit): Arianna J. Freeman in 2022
- First Asian American [female] (United States Court of Appeals for the Third Circuit): Cindy K. Chung in 2023
- First Latino American female (United States Court of Appeals for the Fifth Circuit): Irma Carrillo Ramirez in 2023
- First African American female (United States Court of Appeals for the Eleventh Circuit): Nancy Abudu in 2023
- First openly lesbian [and LGBT person] (United States Court of Appeals for the Fourth Circuit): Nicole Berner in 2024

==== U.S. Customs Court ====
- First female: Genevieve R. Cline (1921) in 1928

==== Supreme Court of the U.S. ====
- First female: Sandra Day O'Connor (1952) in 1981
- First Jewish female: Ruth Bader Ginsburg (1959) in 1993
- First Hispanic American female: Sonia Sotomayor (1980) in 2009
- First African American female: Ketanji Brown Jackson in 2022

== See also ==
- Women in law
- Women in the workforce
- List of female state supreme court justices
- List of first women lawyers and judges in the United States
- Ada Kepley, 1847-1925 - first woman to graduate from a law school in the United States (1870)
