= Mary O'Toole =

Irish-American municipal judge (1874–1954)

Mary O’Toole
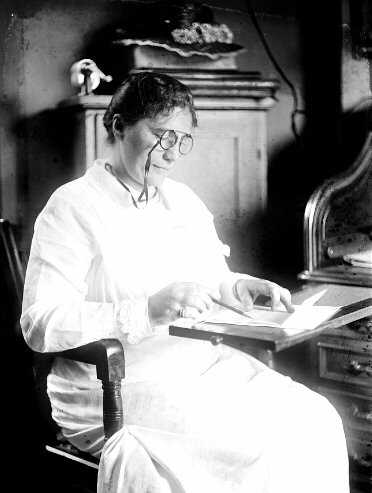

Judge of the United States District Court for the District of Columbia
- In office May 1, 1921 – June 14, 1943
- Nominated by: Warren G. Harding

Personal details
- Born: April 4, 1874 Hacketstown, County Carlow, Ireland
- Died: July 24, 1954 (aged 80) Washington, D.C., U.S.
- Education: Washington College of Law (LL.B.) (LL.M.)
- Known for: First woman municipal judge in the United States of America

Mary O'Toole (April 4, 1874 – July 24, 1954) was the first woman municipal judge of the United States. Mayor Muriel Bowser declared 21 July 2022 "Mary O'Toole Day" in Washington, D.C. In 2023, a children's book on O'Toole, titled "The Trailblazing Life of Mary O'Toole: A Pioneering Woman on the Bench", co-authored by Nichola D. Gutgold and O'Toole's grand-niece Paula Mulhall, was published by Eifrig Publishing.

== Early life ==
O'Toole was born in Hacketstown, County Carlow, Ireland to Nicholas O'Toole and Brigid O'Toole (née O'Connor). Her father Nicholas was imprisoned in Naas Gaol in 1882 because he was a follower of Charles Stewart Parnell's no-rents campaign.

O'Toole emigrated to the United States at age 16. She was the first woman to be naturalised in Steuben County, New York, in 1900, and afterwards became the first woman to be appointed official stenographer in Steuben County.

She studied at Washington College of Law, completing her Bachelor of Laws in 1908, and Master of Laws in 1914. She was a member of the Phi Delta Delta women's legal fraternity.

== Career ==
O'Toole was appointed Judge of the Municipal Court of Washington, D.C. by President Warren G. Harding in 1921 and confirmed by the Senate. At the time of her appointment, there were only three woman judges in the United States. In August 1921, she was the first judge in the District of Columbia to perform a marriage ceremony.

In 1924, she was a delegate at a meeting of the American Bar Association, held in London. She was re-appointed to the Municipal Court by President Coolidge in 1925.

O'Toole was a member of the board of trustees of the Washington College of Law, and held the position of Acting Dean of the College while Dean Grace Hays Riley attended the American Legion Convention in Paris in September 1927.

In January 1928, E. E. Dudding, national president of the Prisoner's Aid Society, wrote to the Department of Justice nominating O'Toole to fill the vacancy on the bench of the District of Columbia Supreme Court caused by the resignation of Judge Adolph Hoehling, stating, "There is no better lawyer in Washington or anywhere else. She knows the law. She is judicial. She would make one of the best judges to be found and would, I think, raise public opinion of Federal courts".

O'Toole was reappointed to the Municipal Court by President Hoover in 1929.

In 1930, O'Toole was named one of the 50 women who had done the most for Washington by The Washington Post. Referring to O'Toole as a "pioneering woman member of the bench" and "a fixture in Washington's judiciary system", The Washington Post in 1934 reported on how, prior to her initial appointment, "the very mention of her name as a prospective member of the bench made usually dignified men pace the floor and use undignified language".

In 1931, she was elected to the executive committee of the National Association of Women Lawyers, which her colleague Dr Ellen Spencer Mussey had helped found in 1919. She spoke at the Thirty-Seventh Annual Meeting of the National Association of Women Lawyers on 5 August 1936.

O'Toole was also a member of the Phi Delta Delta Women's Legal Fraternity and the District of Columbia Women's Bar Association.

== Views ==
=== Capital punishment ===
In September 1929, The Washington Daily News reported that O'Toole was "one of the most ardent anti-capital punishment workers in the District [of Columbia]". She is stated to have said, "I am convinced that experience, history, and psychology teach us that the death penalty is wrong. In any event, it does not suit our times and the upward and onward progress of our civilisation. That we constantly try to mitigate its horrors for ourselves by seeking and selecting the least painful methods of inflicting it, by limiting the number of witnesses, and so on, is the sure argument for its abolishment". O'Toole led a successful campaign to have the Washington Chamber of Commerce go on record as opposing capital punishment.

=== Divorce ===
An interview with O'Toole was published in The Washington Post on February 26, 1928, under the headline "High Divorce Rate a Sign of Progress: Some Very Frank Opinions From a Woman on the Bench, Judge Mary O'Toole, of the Municipal Court of the District of Columbia, and Why She Does Not 'View With Alarm' Recent Increase in Marriage Breaks". She was quoted in the interview as saying, "A woman seeks divorce for one of three main reasons: To protect herself from a person no longer tolerable; to be free, perhaps to acquire other bonds; or to free her husband, her economic independence lulling the fear of want and poverty, so large a factor in the life of women of an earlier day".

=== Suffrage ===
O'Toole was the president of the District of Columbia State Equal Suffrage Association, a member of the Executive Council of the National American Woman Suffrage Association, and a member of The League of Women Voters. She campaigned for women's suffrage and voting rights for citizens of the District of Columbia. She wrote an article for a local newspaper that started, "Why do I favour suffrage for the District? As well ask me why I want to eat. One seems quite as obvious as the other". She assisted Mary Summer Boyd, Secretary of the Data Department, National American Woman Suffrage Association, with an analysis of equal guardianship laws "which give the mother equal rights with the father in respect to custody, control of education, religion, medical care, etc., of her children, equal rights to their earnings and an equal inheritance right in respect to them", which was published in the Woman Suffrage Year Book, 1917.

== Other interests ==
O'Toole was the first president of the Women's City Club of Washington, D.C. which was founded in 1919. On the club's ethos, O'Toole said the group hoped to attract not only women in the academic and professional sphere, but housewives as well. The Club's charter called for a "better understanding among women, and a place for women to meet and socialise".

She was the first woman to be chosen as director of the Washington Chamber of Commerce, and was a director in the Citizens Savings Bank of Washington, D.C.

O'Toole also had membership with the Sulgrave Institution, the Columbia Historical Society, the Catholic Actors Guild, the American Catholic History Association, the American Association of University Women, the Women's National Republican Club, the League of Republican Women of the District, and the American Legion Auxiliary.

== See also ==
- Women in the United States judiciary
- Women in law
- List of first women lawyers and judges in Washington D.C.
- List of first women lawyers and judges in the United States
- Timeline of women lawyers in the United States
