= Phi Delta Delta =

North American women's law fraternity

- ΦΔΔ
- Founded: November 11, 1911; 114 years ago University of Southern California, Law School
- Type: Professional
- Former affiliation: PFA
- Status: Merged
- Merge date: August 12, 1972
- Successor: Phi Alpha Delta
- Emphasis: Law, Women
- Scope: International
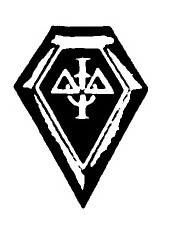
- Member badge
- Colors: Old rose and Violet
- Flower: Rose and Violet
- Jewel: Pearl
- Publication: The Phi Delta Delta
- Chapters: 68
- Members: 5,000 lifetime
- Headquarters: United States

Phi Delta Delta (ΦΔΔ) was a women's professional law fraternity founded in November 1911 at the University of Southern California. It merged with Phi Alpha Delta in 1972.

== History ==
Phi Delta Delta Legal Sorority was founded at the Law School of the University of Southern California on November 11, 1911. Its founders were Georgia Bullock, Gladys Morre Brown, Sarah Patten Doherty, Annette Fillius Hunley, and Vere Radir-Norton. Its purpose was "to promote a higher standard of professional ethics and culture among women in law schools and the legal profession." Phi Delta Delta Legal Fraternity was incorporated as a nonprofit corporation in California on October 25, 1912.

The fraternity went national with the opening of its Beta chapter at the Washington College of Law and Gamma chapter at the Chicago-Kent College of Law in April 1913. This was followed by the Delta chapter at the University of Oregon Law School in 1914. Phi Delta Delta held its first national convention in Los Angeles on August 20–22, 1917 with delegates from Alpha, Delta, and Epsilon chapters.

The fraternity's publication was The Phi Delta Delta. It was established at the fraternity's first convention in 1917 as an annual publication. Initially, it was called Oak Leaves and was edited by a member of the Zeta chapter. At the fraternity's second convention, the publication's frequency was changed to semiannual, along with the name change to The Phi Delta Delta. Its frequency became quarterly after the fraternity's third convention in 1924.

Phi Delta Delta became an international fraternity in 1926 with the establishment of the Omega chapter at the Vancouver School of Law in Vancouver, Canada in January 1926. It also added chapters in Cuba, England, and South America. By March 1926, it was the largest legal sorority in the United States. The fraternity eventually expanded to include 5,000 members and 68 chapters in the United States and Canada.

Phi Delta Delta created an endowment fund that provided loans to students in their last year of law school. In addition, it provided scholarship keys at graduation for scholastic excellence in law school.

Each year at the American Bar Association conference, Phi Delta Delta sponsored a breakfast for deans of law schools, judges, prominent members of the association, and fraternity members. The fraternity also had a speakers bureau on its research interests, including coordinating council movement, juvenile delinquency, legislation impacting women, the probation and parole system, restatement of the law, and taxation.

== Merger ==
In 1970, the all-male legal fraternity Phi Alpha Delta amended its constitution to accept female members. In 1971, Phi Delta Delta began negotiating a merger with Phi Alpha Delta. Both fraternities held conventions in San Diego on August 9–12, 1972. Phi Delta Delta and Phi Alpha Delta reached a merger agreement on August 12, 1972. At this time, all members of Phi Delta Delta became members of Phi Alpha Delta. Its chapters were renamed when they merged into Phi Alpha Delta.

Archival records of Phi Alpha Delta are stored in the special collections of the Charles E. Young Research Library at the University of California, Los Angeles, and the Washburn University School of Law.

== Symbols ==
The colors of Phi Delta Delta were old rose and violet. Its official flowers were the rose and the violet. Its jewel was the pearl.

The fraternity's badge was a flat-topped kite of black enamel, with an anagram of the Greek letters Φ, Δ and Δ, grouped so that the two Deltas appeared as the twin pans of a balance scale.

== Chapters ==
All chapters are now inactive, most having merged into Phi Alpha Delta.

== Notable members ==
Name	Chapter	Notability	References
Edith Atkinson	Rho	judge	
Othilia Carroll Beals	Epsilon	lawyer and judge	
Georgia Bullock	Alpha	first female Superior Court judge in California	
Litta Belle Hibbon Campbell	Alpha	attorney, professor, and the first female deputy district attorney in the United States	
H. Alberta Colclaser	Pi	aviation lawyer and foreign service officer	
Lucile Atcherson Curtis		first woman appointed as a United States Diplomatic Officer	
Harriet Daggett	Alpha Tau	attorney and professor	
Mercedes Deiz	Xi	judge	
Oda Faulconer	Alpha	lawyer, judge, and the president of the Bank of Italy	
Zula Inez Ferguson	Iota	advertising manager at Blackstone's	
Betty Binns Fletcher	Epsilon	United States circuit judge	
Marion Janet Harron	Beta Beta	lawyer and United States Tax Court judge	
Sybil Holmes	Eta	politician and the first woman elected to the Massachusetts Senate	
Lucy Somerville Howorth	Beta Gamma	lawyer, politician, and the first woman to serve in the Mississippi Legislature	
Shirley Hufsteler	Beta Delta, Los Angeles Alumnae chapter	attorney, judge, and United States Secretary of Education	
Reba Hurn	Epsilon	lawyer and Washington state legislator	
May Darlington Lahey	Alpha	lawyer, judge, first Australian woman to serve as a judge	
Manche Irene Langley	Xi	lawyer and professor at Pacific University	
Mary Florence Lathrop		lawyer	
Mildred Lillie	Beta Beta	justice, Court of Appeals of the State of California	
Annabel Matthews	Gamma	judge of the United States Board of Tax Appeals	
Margaret M. McChesney	Eta	lawyer	
Mary O'Toole	Beta	U.S. District Court judge, first woman municipal judge of the United States	
Ruth Bryan Owen		U.S. House of Representatives. U.S. Envoy to Denmark, pioneering filmmaker	
Emma Fall Schofield		judge	
Orfa Jean Shontz	Alpha	lawyer and judge	
Sara Soffel	Lambda	lawyer and judge	
Mary Jane Spurlin	Xi	judge	
F. Josephine Stevenson	Alpha	lawyer	
Martha Ware	Eta	district court judge	
Ida V. Wells	Alpha	lawyer	
Reah Whitehead	Epsilon	lawyer and justice of the peace	
Mabel Walker Willebrandt	Alpha	U.S. Assistant Attorney General	
