= Zula Inez Ferguson =

American advertising manager

- Born: February 27, 1899; Paducah, Kentucky, U.S.
- Died: October 28, 1988 (aged 89)
- Education: Vanderbilt University (BA), Columbia University (MA)
- Alma mater: Vanderbilt University; Columbia University
- Occupation: Advertising manager
- Employer: Blackstone's
- Parent(s): McDougal Ferguson; Inez Kimbrough

Zula Inez Ferguson (February 27, 1899 – October 28, 1988) was an advertising manager at Blackstone's in Los Angeles.

== Early life ==
Zula Inez Ferguson was born on February 27, 1899, in Paducah, Kentucky. She was the daughter of Hon. McDougal Ferguson (1858–1909) and Inez Kimbrough (1867–1902). Her father was a member of the Kentucky General Assembly, Kentucky Senate, and Kentucky Railroad Commission. He died of malaria in 1909.

She had 4 siblings: Garth K. (1887–1972), Lillian T., Elizabeth W., and McDougal Ferguson Jr. Her grandfather was Rev. John D. Ferguson, a Christian preacher, and she was a member of the First Christian Church of Paducah.

Ferguson received a B.A. from Vanderbilt University and an M.A. from Columbia University. She studied law at Vanderbilt, the University of Kentucky, and University of Southern California. She was a member of Phi Delta Delta and Alpha Xi Delta.

== Career ==
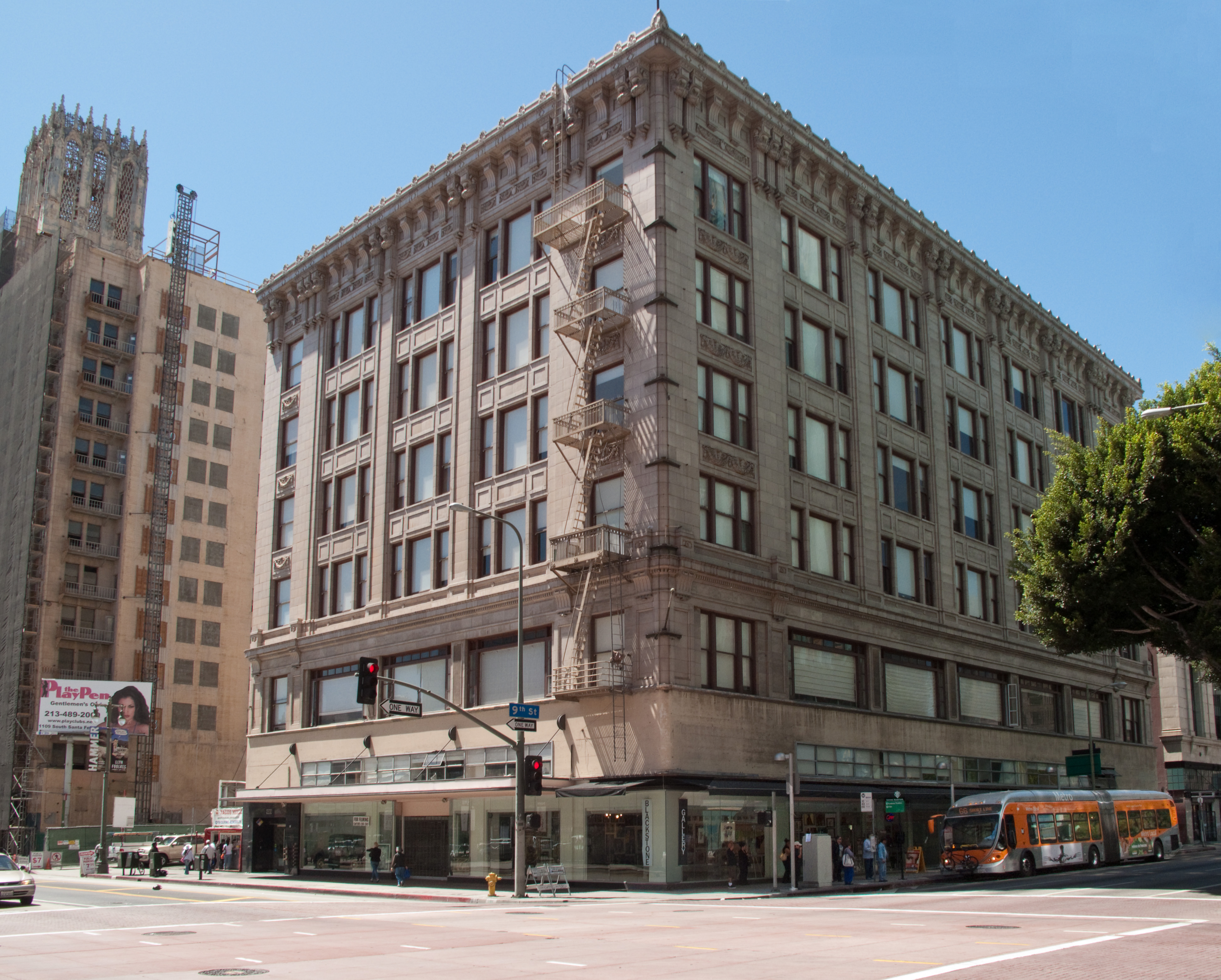
Blackstone's

Ferguson was advertising manager at Blackstone's, Los Angeles. She engaged in various advertising and publicity positions.

== Personal life ==
Ferguson lived at 322 North Alexandria Avenue, Little Armenia, Los Angeles. She died on October 28, 1988.
