= Mary Jane Spurlin =

American judge

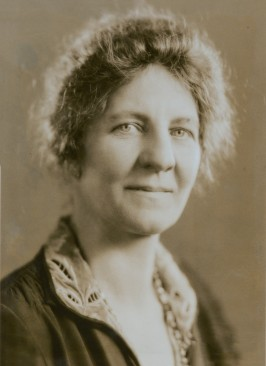
- Judge Mary Jane Spurlin, 1924

Multnomah County District Court Judge
- In office April 1, 1926 – Unknown
- Nominated by: Governor Walter M. Pierce

Personal details
- Born: January 16, 1883
- Died: June 4, 1970 (aged 87) Portland, Oregon
- Education: Lewis & Clark Law School

Mary Jane Spurlin (January 16, 1883 – June 4, 1970) became Oregon's first woman judge in 1926 after Governor Walter M. Pierce appointed her as a Multnomah County district judge. In 1927, Spurlin was elected president of the Portland Federation of Women's Clubs.

== Early life ==
Mary Jane Spurlin was a native of Virginia, the daughter of D. A. and Daisy Marie Spurlin.

== Career ==
Spurlin graduated from Lewis & Clark Law School in 1924. In 1926, Governor Walter M. Pierce appointed her district judge for Multnomah County. She became Oregon's first woman judge on April 1, 1926 when she was sworn into that position. Governor Pierce had previously appointed her to Oregon's Child Welfare Commission. She was defeated in November 1926 in the following election.

In 1935, Spurlin became Oregon's director of women's programs for the Works Progress Administration.

Spurlin wrote in 1935 about the negative reactions the public had to uniformed police officers, adding that policewomen in street dress had an advantage over uniformed patrolmen in gaining the confidence of both troublesome children and their parents.

Spurlin was a member of the Women Lawyers Association of Oregon. She was also a member of the General Federation of Women's Clubs. Spurlin was elected president of the Portland Federation of Women's Clubs on April 9, 1927. In addition, she was a member of the Business and Professional Women's Club (which was organized in Oregon by Abigail Keasey Frankel), the Soroptimist Club, the Women's Convalescent Home Board, the League of Women Voters, the Phi Delta Delta, and the Professional Woman's League.

== Personal life ==
She moved to Oregon in 1913 and lived at 315 Piatt Building, Portland, Oregon.

== See also ==
- List of first women lawyers and judges in Oregon
