= List of first women lawyers and judges in Oregon =

This is a list of the first women lawyer(s) and judge(s) in Oregon. It includes the year in which the women were admitted to practice law (in parentheses). Also included are women who achieved other distinctions such becoming the first in their state to graduate from law school or become a political figure.

== Firsts in Oregon's history ==
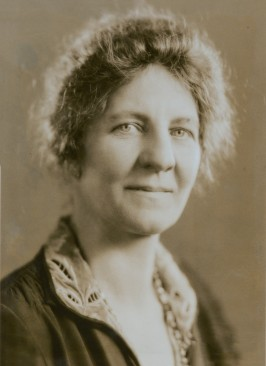
Mary Jane Spurlin: First female judge in Oregon

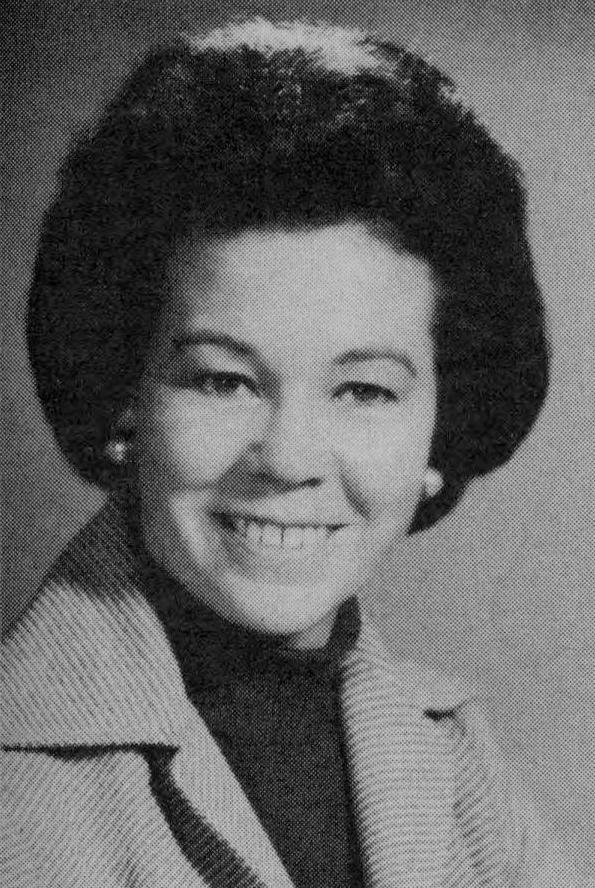
Betty Roberts: First female Justice of the Oregon Supreme Court (1982)

=== Lawyers ===
- First female: Mary Leonard (1885)
- First African American and Latino female: Mercedes Deiz (1960)

=== Law Clerk ===
- First female to clerk for a federal judge in Oregon: Helen F. Althaus (1945) from 1947-1949

=== State judges ===
- First female (temporary): Ethel Graham in 1914
- First female: Mary Jane Spurlin (1924)
- First female (circuit court): Jean Lagerquist Lewis (1938) in 1961
- First African American female: Mercedes Deiz (1960) in 1969
- First female (Oregon Court of Appeals): Betty Roberts (1966) in 1977
- First female (Supreme Court of Oregon): Betty Roberts (1966) in 1982
- First openly lesbian female: Janice Wilson in 1991
- First females (tax court): Jill A. Tanner and Coyreen Weidner in 1997
- First female (Chief Judge; Oregon Court of Appeals): Mary Deits in 1997
- First Hispanic American female (Oregon Court of Appeals): Darleen Ortega (1989) in 2003
- First African American (female) (appellate court): Adrienne Nelson (1993) in 2006
- First Asian American female: Youlee Yim You in 2007
- First openly lesbian female (Supreme Court of Oregon): Virginia Linder (1980) in 2007
- First openly lesbian and Asian American (female) (Oregon Court of Appeals): Lynn Nakamoto (1985) in 2011
- First openly lesbian and Asian American (female) (Supreme Court of Oregon): Lynn Nakamoto (1985) in 2015
- First African American (female) (Supreme Court of Oregon): Adrienne Nelson (1993) in 2018
- First female (Chief Justice; Supreme Court of Oregon): Martha Lee Walters in 2018
- First Laotian American (female): Chanpone Sinlapasai in 2022
- First South Asian (female) (Supreme Court of Oregon): Aruna Masih in 2023
- First Arab American (female) and first Muslim American (female) (Multnomah County Circuit Court): Rima Ghandour in 2023.

=== Federal judges ===
- First female (U.S. District Court of Oregon): Helen Frye (1966) in 1980
- First female (U.S. Bankruptcy Court): Polly Higden in 1983
- First female (magistrate; United States District Court for the District of Oregon): Janice Stewart in 1993
- First female (U.S. Court of Appeals for the Ninth Circuit): Susan P. Graber (1972) in 1998
- First female (Chief Judge; United States District Court Judge for the District of Oregon): Ann Aiken (1979) in 2009
- First Asian American (female) (magistrate; United States District Court for the District of Oregon): Youlee Yim You in 2016
- First Asian American (female) (U.S. Court of Appeals for the Ninth Circuit): Jennifer Sung in 2021
- First African American female (United States District Court for the District of Oregon): Adrienne Nelson (1993) in 2023

=== Attorney General ===
- First [Jewish] female: Ellen Rosenblum (1975) in 2012

=== Assistant Attorney General ===
- First (African American) female (Department of Justice): Armonica Gilford (1981) in 1989

=== Solicitor General ===
- First openly lesbian female: Virginia Linder (1980) from 1986-1997

=== United States Attorney ===
- First female (law clerk): Susan P. Graber (1972)

=== Political Office ===
- First openly bisexual female (governor): Kate Brown (1985) in 2015

=== Oregon State Bar Association ===
- First female president: Julie Frantz in 1992
- First Asian American (female) president: Liani J. Reeves in 2020

== Firsts in local history ==
- Barb Haslinger and Alta Brady: First female judges respectively in Central Oregon (1990 and 1994)
- Paula Bechtold (1975): First female judge in Coos County, Oregon
- Jody Newby: First female District Attorney for Coos County, Oregon (2025)
- Diana Wales (1977): First female lawyer in private practice in Roseburg, Oregon [Douglas County, Oregon]
- Jeannette Thatcher Marshall (1946): First female lawyer in Medford, Oregon [Jackson County, Oregon]
- Beth Heckert: First female District Attorney for Jackson County, Oregon (c. 2013)
- Valerie Love: First Asian American female to become a Judge of the Lane County Circuit Court, Oregon (2007)
- Clara Rigmaiden: First Hispanic American female to become a Judge of the Lane County Circuit Court, Oregon (2007)
- Patty Perlow: First female District Attorney for Lane County, Oregon (2015)
- Jolie Russo (1988): First female magistrate in Eugene, Oregon (2016) [Lane County, Oregon]
- Sharon Cox Stevens (1978): First female lawyer in Linn County, Oregon
- Jane Evenson: First female Justice of the Peace in Silverton, Marion County, Oregon (1935)
- Hattie Bratzel Kremen: First female District Attorney for Marion County, Oregon (1956-1964)
- Jean Lagerquist Lewis (1938): First female judge in Multnomah County, Oregon (1954)
- Beatrice Morrow Cannady (Law Degree, 1922): First African American female lawyer to appear in Portland, Oregon [Multnomah County, Oregon]
- Youlee You: First Asian American female to become a Judge of the Multnomah County Superior Court, Oregon (2007)
- Rima Ghandour: First Arab American female and first Muslim American to serve as a judge in Multnomah County, Oregon
- Nancy W. Campbell: First female judge in Washington County, Oregon
- Carol E. Jones: First female judge appointed to the Yamhill County Circuit Court [Yamhill County, Oregon]

== See also ==
- List of first women lawyers and judges in the United States
- Timeline of women lawyers in the United States
- Women in law

== Other topics of interest ==
- List of first minority male lawyers and judges in the United States
- List of first minority male lawyers and judges in Oregon
