= Lotus Langley =

American politician (1875–1955)

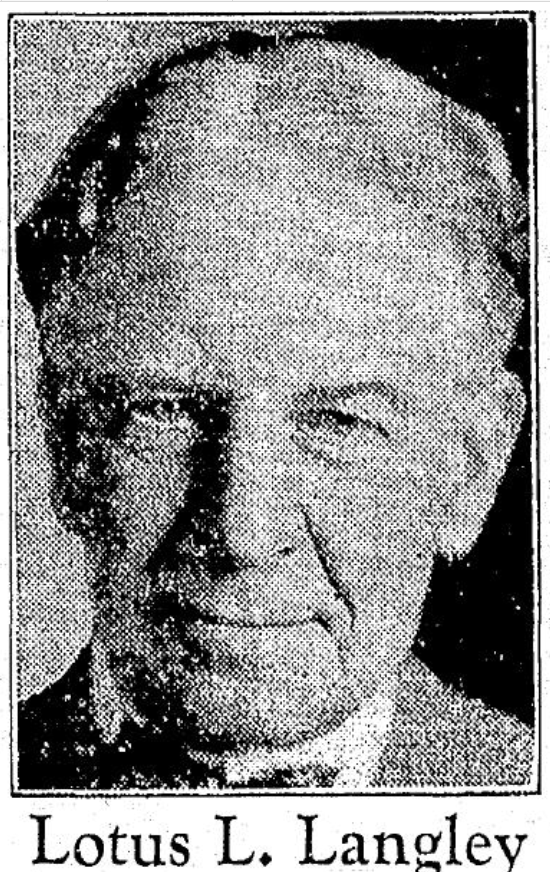
Langley as shown in a 1934 political ad

Lotus L. Langley (September 15, 1875-1955) was a Democratic politician and lawyer in the U.S. state of Oregon in the early 20th century. He served one term as district attorney of Multnomah County, after defeating rival Stanley Myers by the largest majority of any previous occupant of the office.

A "Committee of 50" vigorously pursued his recall in 1932, but fell just short of the requisite number of signatures. The committee "came into being when it seemed evident that maladministration of city affairs existed, and that under existing conditions there was little likelihood of the facts becoming generally known..." It claimed credit for producing the evidence that resulted in grand jury indictments against the mayor and a city commissioner, and the recall of the latter. The recall petition accused Langley of "incompetence, personal laziness and negligence that render him unfit to continue in his official capacity" and alleged that he was less than diligent in pursuing certain convictions. Langley also commented on the lack of convictions, focusing on gambling, and placed the blame on the police bureau.

Langley authored the amendment to the Oregon Constitution that provides for 10-juror convictions in criminal cases, ran to be a delegate to a contentious Democratic National Convention in 1940, and served as state chair of the Democratic party, and as president of the Multnomah County bar association. He was also chosen as vice president of the District Attorneys of Oregon. In 1937 he was appointed to the state parole board by Governor Martin.

Langley was born in Scranton, Iowa in 1875. He grew up in northwestern Kansas, and described his experience herding cattle as formative. An early job was inking forms, and later running the press, for the Hoxie Sentinel. He moved to Oregon in 1891, attended Pacific University, and then worked in his father's law office.

Langley's sister Manche Irene Langley was one of the first woman lawyers in Oregon, and his son William served an incomplete term as Multnomah County district attorney prior to being removed from office. He also had a daughter named Mary.
