= Turtle Creek, Pennsylvania =

Borough in Pennsylvania, US

- Borough
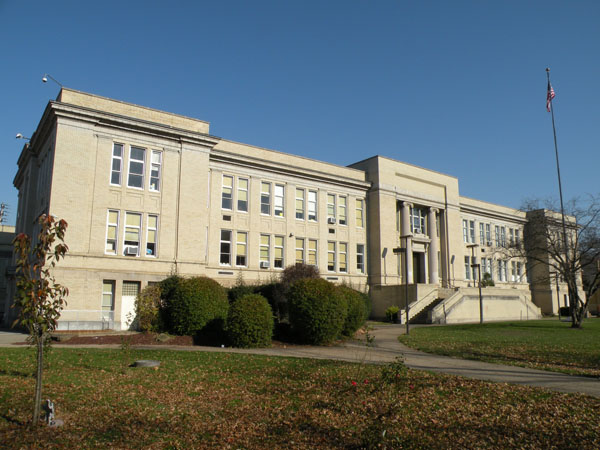
- Turtle Creek High School, built in 1917
- Etymology: Iroquois Turtle Clan
- Location in Allegheny County and the U.S. state of Pennsylvania.

- Location of Pennsylvania in the United States
- Coordinates: 40°24′29″N 79°49′18″W
- Country: United States
- State: Pennsylvania
- County: Allegheny
- Founded: 1892

Government
  - Mayor: Adam Forgie

Area
  - Total: 0.97 sq mi (2.51 km^{2})
  - Land: 0.97 sq mi (2.51 km^{2})
  - Water: 0 sq mi (0.00 km^{2})
- Elevation: 833 ft (254 m)

Population (2020)
  - Total: 5,114
  - Estimate (2019): 5,138
  - Density: 5,300.9/sq mi (2,046.69/km^{2})
- Time zone: UTC-5 (EST)
  - Summer (DST): UTC-4 (EDT)
- ZIP code: 15145
- Area code: 412
- FIPS code: 42-77912
- School District: Woodland Hills
- Website: www.turtlecreekborough.us

Turtle Creek is a borough in Allegheny County, Pennsylvania, United States, 12 miles (19 km) southeast of Pittsburgh. The population was 5,114 at the 2020 census. George Westinghouse constructed a manufacturing plant nearby. Turtle Creek takes its name from a small stream that flows into the Monongahela River. Before white settlers arrived, there was a small village of Native Americans living there from the Turtle Clan of the Iroquois Nation. (See: East Pittsburgh and Wilmerding.)

== Geography ==
Turtle Creek is located at 40°24′29″N 79°49′18″W (40.408018, −79.821802).

According to the United States Census Bureau, the borough has a total area of 1.0 square mile (2.6 km^{2}), all land.

== Neighboring municipalities ==
Turtle Creek has five borders, including Wilkins Township to the west and north, Monroeville to the east, Wilmerding to the southeast, North Versailles Township to the south, and East Pittsburgh to the southwest.

== Demographics ==
Historical population
Census	Pop.	Note	%±
1880	548		—
1900	3,262		—
1910	4,995		53.1%
1920	8,138		62.9%
1930	10,690		31.4%
1940	9,805		−8.3%
1950	12,363		26.1%
1960	10,607		−14.2%
1970	8,308		−21.7%
1980	6,959		−16.2%
1990	6,556		−5.8%
2000	6,076		−7.3%
2010	5,349		−12.0%
2020	5,114		−4.4%

As of the 2000 census, there were 6,076 people, 2,717 households, and 1,516 families residing in the borough. The population density was 6,205.2 inhabitants per square mile (2,395.8/km^{2}). There were 2,969 housing units at an average density of 3,032.1 per square mile (1,170.7/km^{2}). The racial makeup of the borough was 92.71% White, 5.17% African American, 0.08% Native American, 0.61% Asian, 0.15% from other races, and 1.28% from two or more races. Hispanic or Latino of any race were 0.61% of the population.

There were 2,717 households, out of which 23.4% had children under the age of 18 living with them, 37.7% were married couples living together, 14.5% had a female householder with no husband present, and 44.2% were non-families. 39.2% of all households were made up of individuals, and 17.4% had someone living alone who was 65 years of age or older. The average household size was 2.16 and the average family size was 2.91.

In the borough the population was spread out, with 20.1% under the age of 18, 8.1% from 18 to 24, 28.1% from 25 to 44, 21.8% from 45 to 64, and 21.9% who were 65 years of age or older. The median age was 40 years. For every 100 females there were 81.4 males. For every 100 females age 18 and over, there were 78.8 males.

The median income for a household in the borough was $30,057, and the median income for a family was $43,975. Males had a median income of $28,859 versus $23,581 for females. The per capita income for the borough was $17,552. About 10.5% of families and 11.3% of the population were below the poverty line, including 15.0% of those under age 18 and 12.5% of those age 65 or over.

In 1900, 3,262 people lived here; in 1910, 4,995 people lived here, and in 1940, 9,805 people lived in Turtle Creek. The population was 6,076 at the 2000 census.

== Culture ==
The 1960s harmony-pop vocal group the Vogues originated in Turtle Creek.

Actor Ron Harper was born in Turtle Creek.

== Government and politics ==
Presidential election results
Year	Republican	Democratic	Third parties
2020	37% 863	61% 1,428	0.9% 21
2016	38% 798	61% 1,257	1% 22
2012	35% 707	64% 1,301	1% 27

== Notable people ==
- H. Alberta Colclaser, lawyer
- Michael J. Estocin, Vietnam War Medal of Honor Recipient
- Jerry Grcevich, tamburica player and folk musician
- Ron Harper, actor
- Leon Hart, football player
