= Nina Miglionico =

American lawyer (1913–2009)

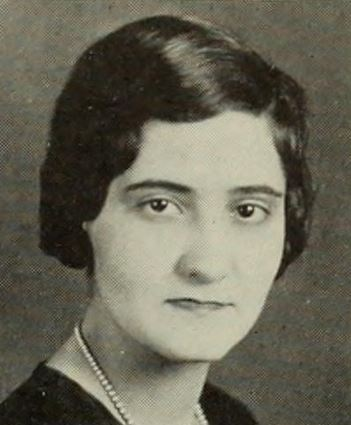
- Miglionico from her 1932 college yearbook
- Born: September 14, 1913; Birmingham, Alabama, US
- Died: May 6, 2009 (aged 95); Birmingham, Alabama, US
- Occupations: Lawyer, clubwoman, city councilmember

Nina Miglionico (September 14, 1913 – May 6, 2009) was an American lawyer and clubwoman in Birmingham, Alabama. She was the first woman to serve on the Birmingham City Council, where she held a seat from 1963 to 1985.

== Early life ==
Miglionico was born in Birmingham, the daughter of Joseph and Mary Miglionico. Her parents were both born in Italy, and ran a delicatessen. She attended Howard College (now known as Samford University), graduating in 1933. She earned her law degree at the University of Alabama at Birmingham in 1936, one of five women in her graduating class.

== Career ==
In 1958, Miglionico was elected president of the National Association of Women Lawyers. She also served on the tax committee of the American Bar Association. As a tax expert, she served on the Citizens Advisory Committee to the Commissioner of Internal Revenue, and was appointed to the President's Commission on the Status of Women.

In Alabama, she was president of the Alabama Federation of Business and Professional Women's Clubs, the Alabama Women Lawyers Association, the Alabama League of Municipalities, the Alabama Merit System League, and the Birmingham Zonta Club. She ran for the Birmingham School Board in 1958. She was the first woman to serve on the Birmingham City Council, a seat she held for over twenty years, from 1963 to 1985. She worked against the poll tax and child labor, and for prison reform, and food safety.

Miglionico was targeted several times with violent warnings for her work on civil rights and women's rights. In 1965, a bomb was placed on the porch of her home; it did not explode. In 1974, when she ran for a Congressional seat, a cross was burned in front of her house.

In 1963, Miglionico was named Birmingham Woman of the Year. In 1996, she was honored by the American Bar Association with a Margaret Brent Award, for her lifetime of accomplishments.

== Personal life ==
Miglionico died in 2009, aged 95 years, in Birmingham. She was inducted into the Alabama Lawyers' Hall of Fame in 2011, and the Alabama Women's Hall of Fame in 2012. There is a statue of Nina Miglionico in Birmingham's Linn Park. Her papers are collected at the Birmingham Public Library and the law library at the University of Alabama. The Women Lawyers Section of the Birmingham Bar Association presents a Nina Miglionico "Paving the Way" Award. The first recipient of the Miglionico Award was judge Inge Prytz Johnson, in 2006.

In 2016, a documentary, Stand Up, Speak Out: The Nina Miglionico Story was released. In 2020, Miglionico was featured in a virtual exhibit to mark the centennial of women's suffrage in Alabama.
