= Olive Stott Gabriel =

American lawyer and suffragist

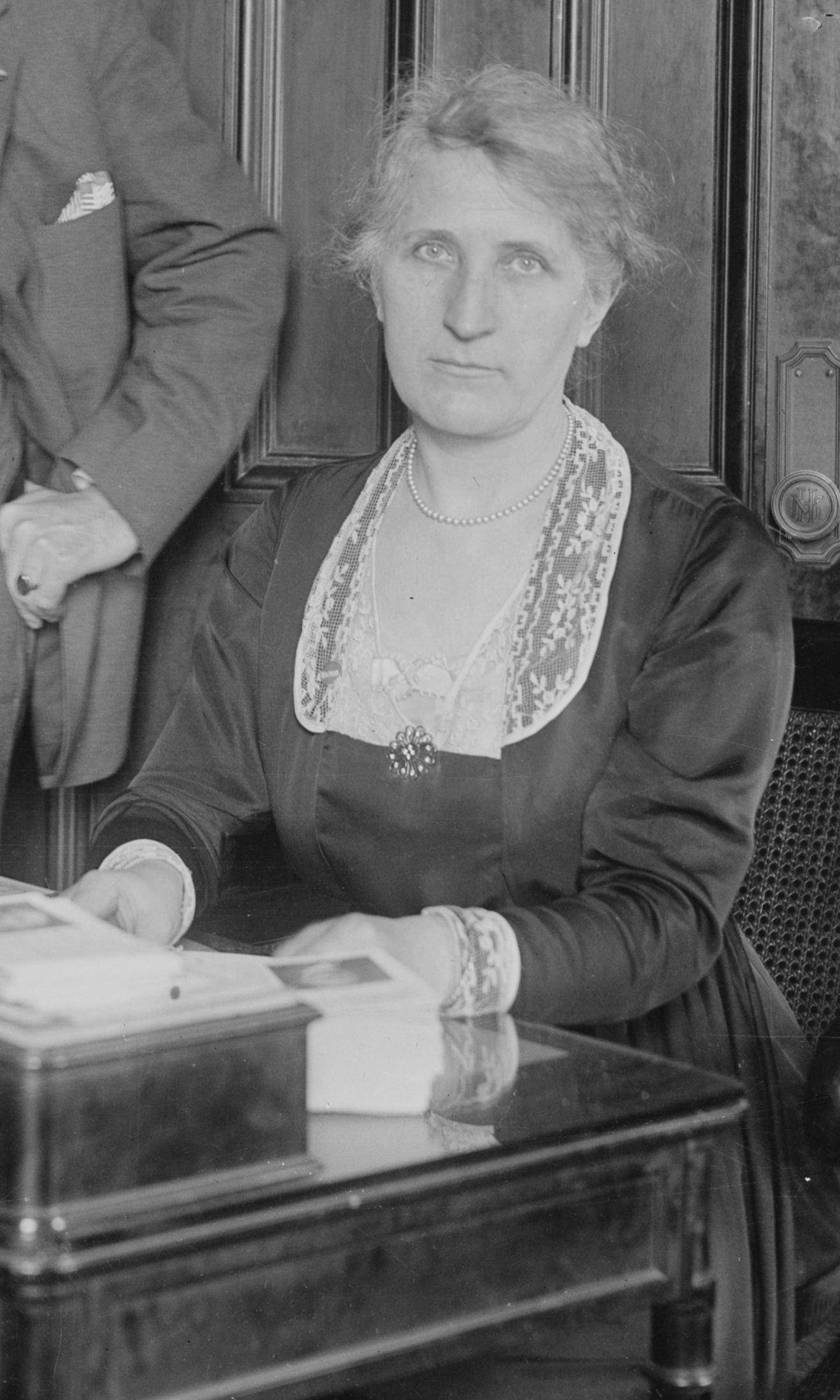
- Born: September 26, 1872; Portland, Oregon, US
- Died: May 6, 1944 (aged 71); Portland, Oregon, US
- Education: St. Mary's Academy and College (1889); New York University School of Law (LL.B, 1902; LL.M, 1903)
- Occupations: Lawyer and activist
- Political party: Republican

Olive Stott Gabriel (September 26, 1872 – May 6, 1944) was an American activist, clubwoman, and lawyer, active in Republican politics in New York City. She served as president of the National Association of Women Lawyers in the early 1930s and was a champion of many Progressive Era feminist causes, such as women's suffrage and the campaign against prostitution.

== Early life and career ==
Gabriel was born in Portland, Oregon, to Fielding Denny Stott, a farmer and businessperson; and Mary Ellen Stott, née Perry, a businessperson, teacher and depot agent. Mary, a cousin of Oliver Hazard Perry, was "an earnest and enthusiastic worker for female suffrage, higher education and kindred reforms." The family lived in Yamhill County.

Gabriel graduated from New York University School of Law with an LL.B in 1902 and LL.M. in 1903. In 1906, she became inaugural second vice president of the Women's Association of the Bar (or the Women's Bar Association of New York), described by The New York Times at the time as the first women's bar association in the world.

She married Adolphe J. Gabriel in Milwaukee on January 13, 1896, following which the couple moved to New York.

Gabriel had settled in Greenwich Village by the early 1900s, with a residence at 77 Washington Place. She later moved to 78 East 96th Street on the Upper East Side, and then back downtown to 45 West 11th Street. She maintained a general law practice, with offices at 220 Broadway as of 1906.

== Suffrage movement ==
In 1909, Gabriel was part of a group of suffrage activists that went to Albany to campaign for passage of state-level legislation for women's suffrage.

In 1913, Gabriel delivered a petition demanding suffrage for women to Washington, D.C, as part of a nationwide petition campaign that summer urging passage of a Senate resolution to extend the franchise.

== Home front in World War I ==
During World War I, Gabriel was active in the War Camp Community Service, a program that provided assistance and entertainment for soldiers in training at military bases in the United States.

As of 1918, she chaired the Employment Department of the New York Mayor's Committee of Women on National Defense, in which capacity she "ma[de] a special attempt to place plain, middle-aged women in war work." (Note: For Gabriel's own description of the Employment Committee's activities, see The Activities of the Mayor's Committee of Women on National Defense, New York, 1918–1919. New York. 1919. pp. 14–15. OCLC 1038747270..)

== "White slavery" ==
As Ellen DuBois has explained, Progressive Era feminists and women's groups were opposed to prostitution and so-called "white slavery," which they regarded as the fate of "sexual innocents" who "fell" into unfortunate conditions. Gabriel was no exception.

As of 1917, Gabriel was involved in a campaign to provide legal counsel to women prosecuted in New York City's women-only night court. Following a campaign by the Committee of Fourteen and others, (Note: For a contemporary account by supporter of the women's night court and a member of the Committee of Fourteen, see Whitin, Frederick H. (1914). "The Women's Night Court in New York City". The Annals of the American Academy of Political and Social Science. 52: 181–187. doi:10.1177/000271621405200122. ISSN 0002-7162. JSTOR 1012497. S2CID 144328646..) the court had been established on September 1, 1910, in an attempt to reduce the perceived perils of the city's night court system, which had originally placed women and men in the same holding cells. Women tried in the night court were typically charged with "vagrancy," a vague, catch-all charge that was typically used to arrest sex workers, so-called "degenerates," and other marginalized people.

In a 1918 book, Rose Falls Bres described Gabriel as having "an international reputation among those who labor to save and secure young girls who have drifted from the strait [sic] and narrow way or who have been the victims of the white slave traffic."

== Republican politics ==
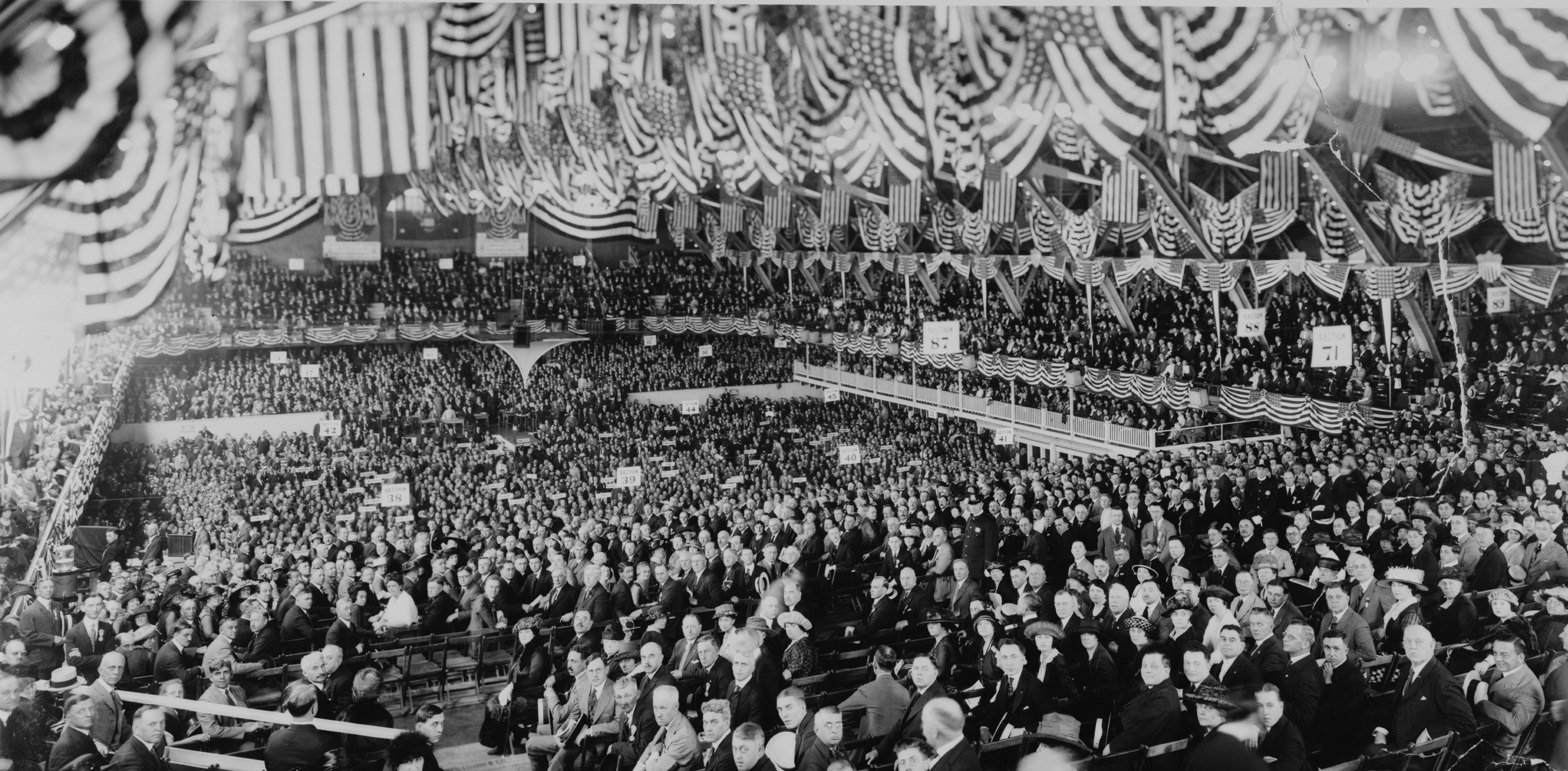
The convention hall at the 1920 Republican National Convention. Gabriel served as an alternate.

In 1918, Gabriel served as campaign manager to A. Parker Nevin, a Republican candidate for the New York Supreme Court. In July 1918, she was a delegate to the New York State Republican convention for Manhattan's 10th Assembly District, along with a number of other suffrage activists. In 1919, she helped to form the National Woman's Republican Association in New York.

In 1920, Gabriel supported James Wolcott Wadsworth Jr.'s campaign for the Republican Senate nomination. This was a somewhat curious endorsement, given Gabriel's suffrage activism, as Wadsworth opposed extending the franchise to women—and the fact that the 1920 election was the first in which women were able to vote. Nonetheless, as a number of other prominent Republican women including Henrietta Wells Livermore endorsed Wadsworth (despite a campaign against him by Mary Garrett Hay), it seems likely that Gabriel was convinced to side with the Livermore faction.

In June 1920, Gabriel was an alternate delegate to the 1920 Republican National Convention, at which Warren G. Harding received the Republican nomination. She had organized voters for Harding, as against Frank Orren Lowden, then the Governor of Illinois. She served as an alternate for New York's 14th Assembly district, for which the primary delegates were Fiorello La Guardia and Samuel S. Koenig.

As of 1922, Gabriel was a Republican Party official in New York's 10th Assembly District. She initially endorsed La Guardia for mayor in 1921, but switched her endorsement to Manhattan Borough President Henry H. Curran (not to be confused with Henry M. Curran) shortly thereafter once Republican leadership settled on Curran as their preferred candidate to counter the incumbent Tammany Hall ally John Francis Hylan.

In September 1922, she was voted out of office as "co-leader" of the 10th Assembly District committee. In a speech after the vote, she denounced Tammany Hall boss Charles F. Murphy and Republican leader Samuel S. Koenig, who, she alleged, had combined to subvert John P. Cohalan's election as New York Surrogate. She spoke passionately in favor of Cohalan, on whose campaign she had worked. She would later attribute the Republican Party's losses in the 1922 elections to a lack of women in leadership positions.

Gabriel was a correspondent of Senator William Borah. Borah wrote to her on March 7, 1924 regarding the Teapot Dome scandal and related upheavals in the Harding administration, suggesting that Republicans ought to "clean out" their ranks in response.

== National Association of Women Lawyers ==
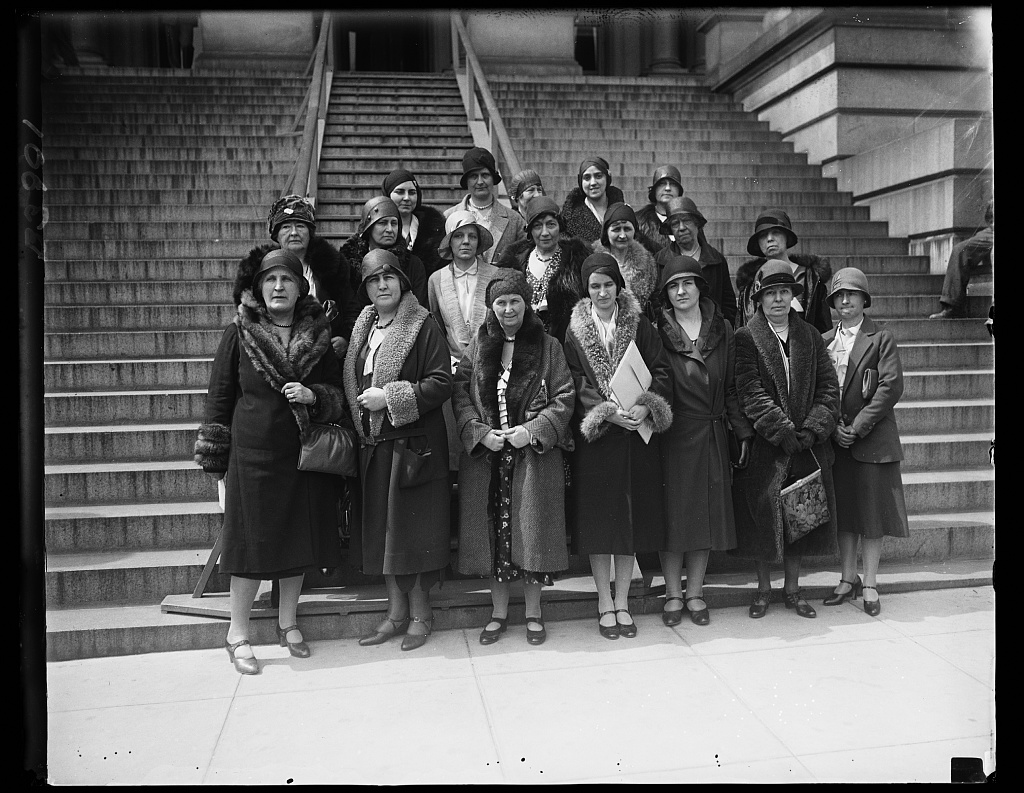
Gabriel (front left) was part of a delegation sent by the National Association of Women Lawyers to President Herbert Hoover in 1930.

Gabriel became president of the National Association of Women Lawyers in 1930 and continued to serve for several years in the early 1930s.

In October 1930, Gabriel was one of three lawyers selected by the New York City Federation of Women's Clubs to respond to the arrest of Emma Swift Hammerstein (third wife of Oscar Hammerstein I) on vagrancy charges. The charges, which many clubwomen took to be trumped-up, were among the catalysts for the investigation into corruption in New York City law and politics known as the Hofstadter Committee or Seabury Commission. Among other things, the investigation revealed routine perjury by police in criminal cases. In response, the group requested that Franklin D. Roosevelt, then Governor of New York, pardon women who had been convicted on the basis of falsified testimony.

On December 13, 1933, Gabriel wrote to Roosevelt—now President—on behalf of the Association, requesting that the United States support inclusion of the following language in the Montevideo Convention: (Note: For background, see Scott, James Brown (October 1930). "Inter-American Commission of Women". The American Journal of International Law. 24 (4): 757–762. doi:10.2307/2190067. JSTOR 2190067.)

The Contracting Parties agree that from the going into effect of this treaty there shall be no distinction based on sex in their law and practice relating to nationality.

Ultimately, the language was not adopted.

In a 1934 speech to the National Association of Women Lawyers, Gabriel spoke out against the Codes of Fair Competition promulgated by the National Recovery Administration, alleging that they had the effect of "forc[ing] women back into the home." She called on the federal government to provide assistance to unemployed women. She further stated:

We cautiously advanced in our seventy-five years of progress until now ... We must demand for our women employment, appointments, salaries and promotion on equal terms with men. We must stand squarely against all discrimination based on sex.

== Other activities ==
Gabriel served as secretary of the "New Yorkers" club, founded February 4, 1907, whose "object" was to "facilitate social intercourse, broaden intellectuality, encourage congeniality and harmony and promote the general progress of New York women."

As of 1916, Gabriel, along with Rose Falls Bres, founded a publication called Oyez that aimed to "draw the attention of women to their complete lack of legal status."

In 1919, Gabriel sponsored a resolution by the New York Federation of Women's Clubs calling upon fashion designers to produce less revealing clothing.

Gabriel opposed the League of Nations and, accordingly, was involved in an organization called the Special Campaign Committee of American Women Opposed to the League of Nations as of late 1919.

In late 1920, Gabriel spoke at a rally at the Polo Grounds in honor of Terence MacSwiney, following his death in October 1920.

== See also ==
- History of New York City (1898–1945)
- Women in law

== Sources ==
- Bres, Rose Falls (1918). Maids, Wives and Widows: The Law of the Land and of the Various States as it Affects Women. New York: E. P. Dutton. OCLC 1114456476 – via Internet Archive.
- DuBois, Ellen Carol (1998). Woman Suffrage and Women's Rights. New York: New York University Press. pp. 141–142. ISBN 0-585-43471-9. OCLC 51232208.
- Perry, Elisabeth Israels (2019). After the Vote: Feminist Politics in La Guardia's New York. Oxford: Oxford University Press. doi:10.1093/oso/9780199341849.001.0001. ISBN 978-0-19-094854-2. OCLC 1078433948.
- Roberts, Ina Brevoort, ed. (1904). Club Women of New York, 1908–1909. New York: Club Women of New York Company – via Internet Archive.
