= May Darlington Lahey =

Australian lawyer and judge

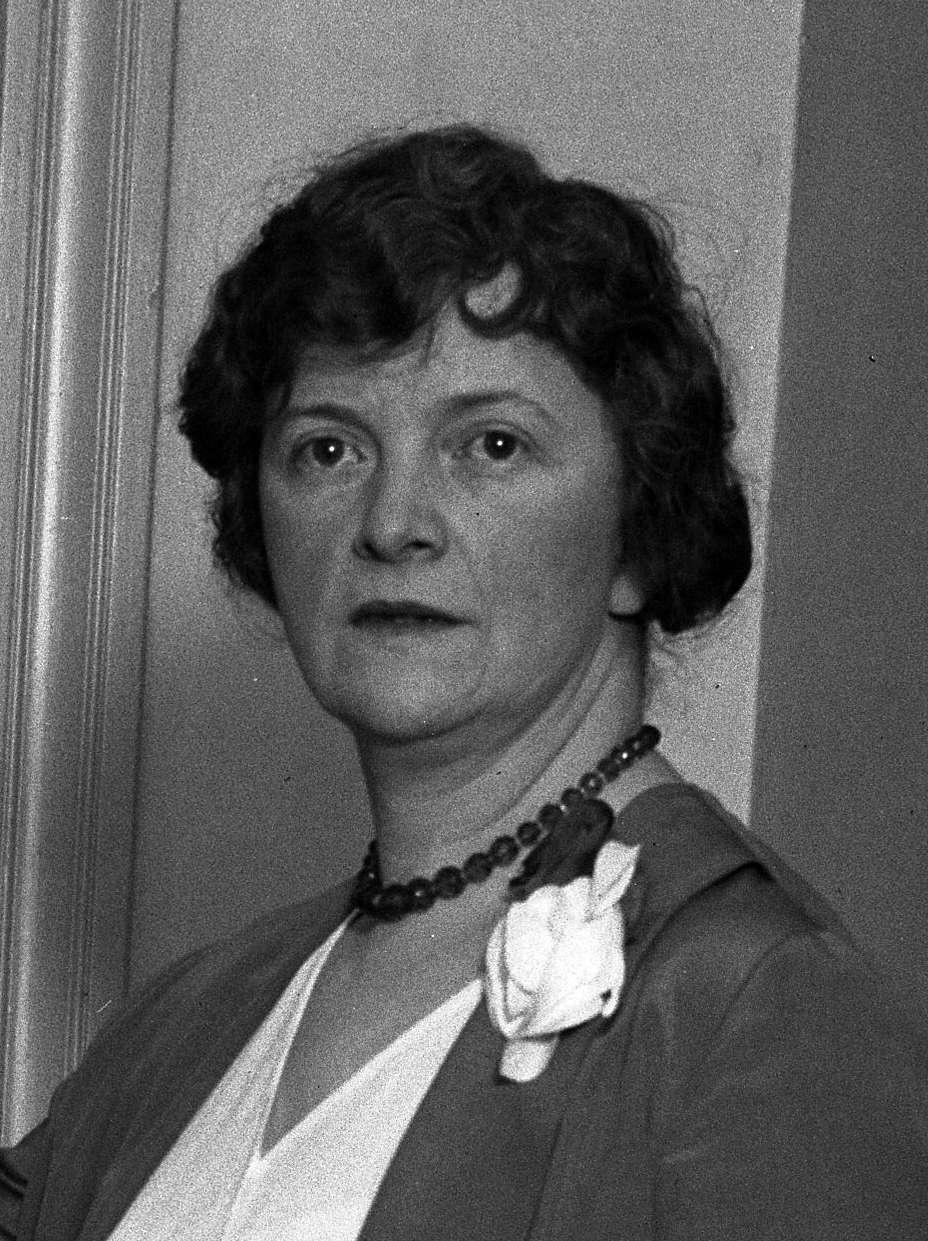
- Judge Lahey in 1931

Presiding judge of the Los Angeles County Superior Court
- In office 1943–1965

Personal details
- Born: 1889 Canungra, Queensland, Australia
- Died: 1984 (aged 94–95)
- Citizenship: United States (from 1916)
- Party: Republican
- Education: Brisbane Girls Grammar School
- Alma mater: University of Sydney, University of Southern California Law
- Profession: Lawyer and judge
- Known for: First Australian woman to serve as a judge

May Darlington Lahey (1889–1984) was an Australian-born American lawyer and jurist. Her career achievements in the United States pre-date similar achievements in Australia: she began practising law in California in 1914, thus becoming the first woman from Queensland to practise law. Likewise, she was appointed a judge in 1928, 35 years before Roma Mitchell became the first female judge in Australia, therefore becoming the first Australian woman to serve as a judge.

== Early life ==
Lahey was born in 1889 in Canungra, south-east Queensland, in 1889 to sawmill operator James Lahey and his wife Amelia. She attended Hillview State School in Canungra and Brisbane Girls Grammar School, completing her studies in 1906, and the University of Sydney. She had an uncle living in California and in 1910 she and her mother and sisters moved there. She attended the University of Southern California's College of Law, where she joined the law society Phi Delta Delta, and graduated with an honours degree in 1914. The same year, she passed the California Bar and began work as a probate lawyer until 1928.

In 1916 she adopted American citizenship, recognising that there were greater opportunities for career advancement in the United States than in her native Australia. Lahey became prominent in women's organisations such as the League of Women Voters and the Women Lawyers Club, and was also an active Republican - she campaigned for Herbert Hoover in his 1928 presidential campaign.

== Appointment as judge ==
In December 1928, the California governor appointed Lahey to be a judge of the Los Angeles County Superior Court, the second woman to be appointed to the court. Lahey was in the news after Jean Harlow's new husband Paul Bern was killed in a mysterious death that was ruled as suicide in 1932. Lahey ruled in Harlow's favour and made her an executor of her husband's estate. After 15 years' service, Lahey was unanimously elected the court's Presiding Judge, becoming the first woman to hold the position.

Lahey briefly retired in 1947, due to ill health but resumed her legal career in 1951, ultimately retiring in 1965. She received the Ernestine Stahlhut award in 1965. She died in Los Angeles in 1984.
