= Georgia Bullock =

Female Superior Court Judge in California from 1931-1956

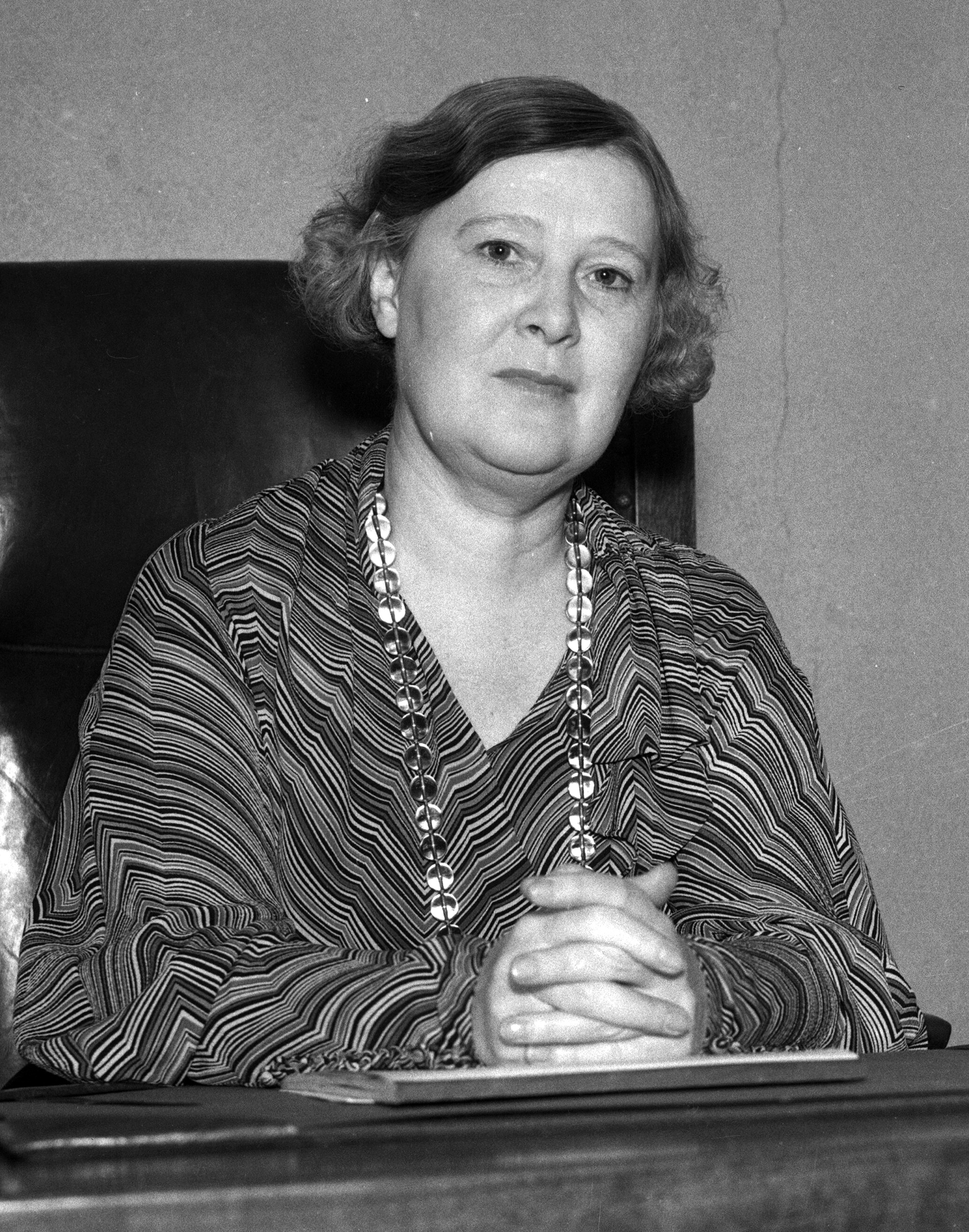
- Bullock c. 1924

Los Angeles Superior Court Judge
- In office August 14, 1931 – 1956
- Appointed by: Gov. James Rolph Jr.

Personal details
- Born: November 18, 1878 Chicago, Illinois
- Died: August 29, 1957 (aged 78) Monterey, California
- Education: University of Southern California Law School

Georgia Philipps Bullock (November 18, 1878 − August 28, 1957) was the first female Superior Court judge in California.

== Education and early career ==
Georgia Philipps Morgan was born in 1878, in Chicago, Illinois, to Thomas Herbert Morgan and Mary Potwin Judd. Her father was born in Aberavon in South Wales. A promising concert singer as a child, she was discouraged by her parents from pursuing a career in music because they disapproved of women performing publicly.

As a young woman, Bullock worked at a law firm during the day and took shorthand and typing classes at night. In 1912, she enrolled in night classes at the University of Southern California law school.

She earned her LL.B. from the University of Southern California's law school in 1914, having already passed the California bar. While still in law school, she began her judicial career by volunteering as a probation officer on the Woman's Court, a division of the Los Angeles Police Court that dealt with female defendants. In 1917, she became a deputy district attorney, prosecuting prostitutes and their clients during World War I. She later moved into private practice.

She was a founding member of Phi Delta Delta, a law student sorority, and co-founded the Women Lawyers Club of Los Angeles. In 1932, she served as vice president of the National Association of Women Lawyers (NAWL). She became a prominent role model for professional woman in Los Angeles, promoting the participation of women in public office and policymaking.

== Judicial experience ==
In 1924, Bullock was named by county supervisors to the Women's Court, becoming the first female judge in California above the level of justice of the peace. Bullock was appointed to the new Women's Court by a Los Angeles judge as a division of his own court. The cases brought before her often involved women charged with crimes such as prostitution and drug use, as well as men charged with sexual violence and failure to support their families. Committed to the principle that men and women deserved the same punishments and rewards, she held women responsible for the behavior. Her work on behalf of women was sometimes seen as progressive, but she also promoted traditional practices such as corporal punishment.

In 1926, following a statute that converted the police court into the municipal court, Bullock became a Los Angeles municipal judge. In 1927, she ran against and beat a male opponent to retain her position. In 1928, she ran for superior court but lost. In 1931, Republican governor James Rolph Jr. appointed her to a vacant seat on the court, making Bullock the second woman in the country to sit on a court of general jurisdiction. She was repeatedly reelected to her seat in elections in 1932, 1938, 1944, and 1950. She retired in 1956.

== Personal life ==
Georgia Morgan married William Wingfield Bullock in 1899. The couple had two children before divorcing. One of her children, Wynn Bullock, became a notable photographer. After moving to Pasadena, California with her children in 1910, Bullock described herself as a widow. While living in the Pasadena area, Judge Bullock belonged to St. James Episcopal Church in South Pasadena, and was active with Zonta International and the Order of the Eastern Star, among other affiliations.

Bullock died in 1957, age 78, in a convalescent home in Monterey, California, after a stroke. The papers of Georgia Philipps Morgan Bullock are archived in UCLA Libraries Special Collections.

== See also ==
- List of first women lawyers and judges in California
