= Manche Irene Langley =

American lawyer (1883–1963)

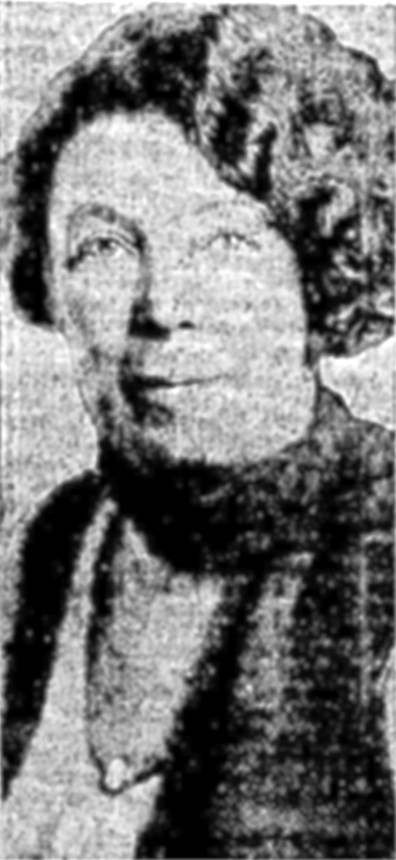
Langley in 1932

Manche Irene Langley (August 19, 1883 - July 13, 1963) was the seventeenth woman in Oregon to practice law. Her career as a litigator lasted from 1909 to 1963; she participated in state and county politics while teaching law at Pacific University.

== Early life and education ==
Langley was born in Furnas County, Nebraska on August 19, 1883. Her father was William Langley, a lawyer, and her mother was Amanda Scott Langley. In 1891, Langley's family moved to Washington County, Oregon. In 1898, she graduated from Forest Grove High School and went on to study at Tualatin Academy, the predecessor of Pacific University. Her brother Lotus Langley and her nephew William Langley both served as district attorney in Multnomah County.

She studied at Pacific University from 1900 to 1903 where she earned certificates in proficiency in certain departments. Langley did not receive a formal degree, but did go on to study law with her father and passed the bar exam in 1909. She practiced law in Forest Grove, Oregon from 1909 to 1933. Langley also earned a bachelor's degree of law from Northwestern College of Law.

== Government Work and Community Service ==
Langley was appointed Democratic National Committee women of Oregon on June 5, 1932. She had also served as the secretary and chairman of the Washington County Democratic Central Committee prior to 1932.

In 1926 she was the president of the Women Lawyers’ Association of Oregon and a member of the League of Women Voters in 1925. The league founded the Northwest Institute of International Relations where she served as a moderator for several early sessions. Langley served on the State Board of the League from 1944 to 1948 and continued her service as a member of its Committee on International Relations in 1950.

She was known for her volunteer work for the Oregon Prison Association and helped with parole cases from 1944 to 1950; she was elected as the vice president in 1949. Langley was a member of Phi Delta Delta, a legal fraternity for women, a member and president of Queen's Bench, American Association, Oregon State Association, and Multnomah Bar Association.

Langley was appointed Multnomah County deputy district attorney in the Women's Division in 1944; later, in 1961 she was appointed chief deputy of the Domestic Relations Department of the Multnomah County District Attorney's Office. She gave legal advice for real estate matters and with domestic relations.

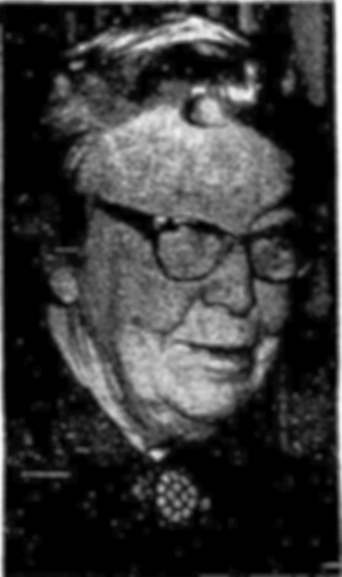
Langley in 1959

== Legacy ==
To honor Langley's legacy of helping women in the legal profession in Oregon, a scholarship fund was established in her name at Lewis & Clark Law School.

Langley died in 1963.
