= Eugénie M. Rayé-Smith =

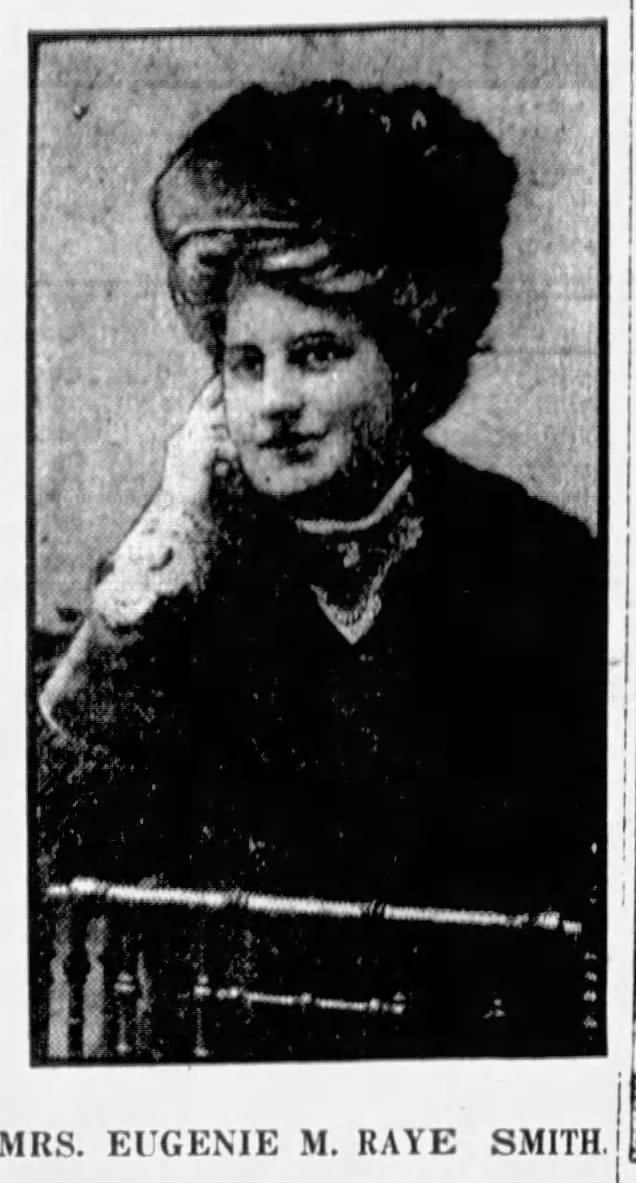
Eugénie M. Rayé Smith from the Times Union, July 10, 1914

Eugénie M. Rayé-Smith (1871 - July 9, 1914) was an American lawyer, educator and suffragist.

Eugénie Marie Rayé-Smith was born around 1871 and attended public school in New York City. She earned her bachelor's degree in 1899 and her master's degree in 1901 from New York University (NYU) where she studied law. She went on to teach the Woman's Law Class at NYU. She married Alexander G. Smith in 1906.

She served as the vice president of the Women Lawyers' Club in New York, which she helped to organize. Rayé-Smith was the first editor of the Women Lawyers Journal (WLJ), which was started in May 1911. As an advocate of women's suffrage, Rayé-Smith founded the Fortnightly Suffrage Club of Richmond Hill. She was well known for her suffrage songs and verses. In 1912, she published an expanded edition of the book, Equal Suffrage Song Sheaf, which included three new songs. This "second edition" was one of the most popular women's suffrage songsters.

Rayé-Smith died in her home on July 9, 1914, at the age of 43. She was buried in Greenwood Cemetery. The next year, the Fortnightly Suffrage Club held a memorial in her honor. The Women Lawyers Journal, nearly a decade after her death, praised Rayé-Smith for her work as editor, noting that her efforts helped grow the "meetingless club" of women lawyers.
