= William Langley (Oregon politician) =

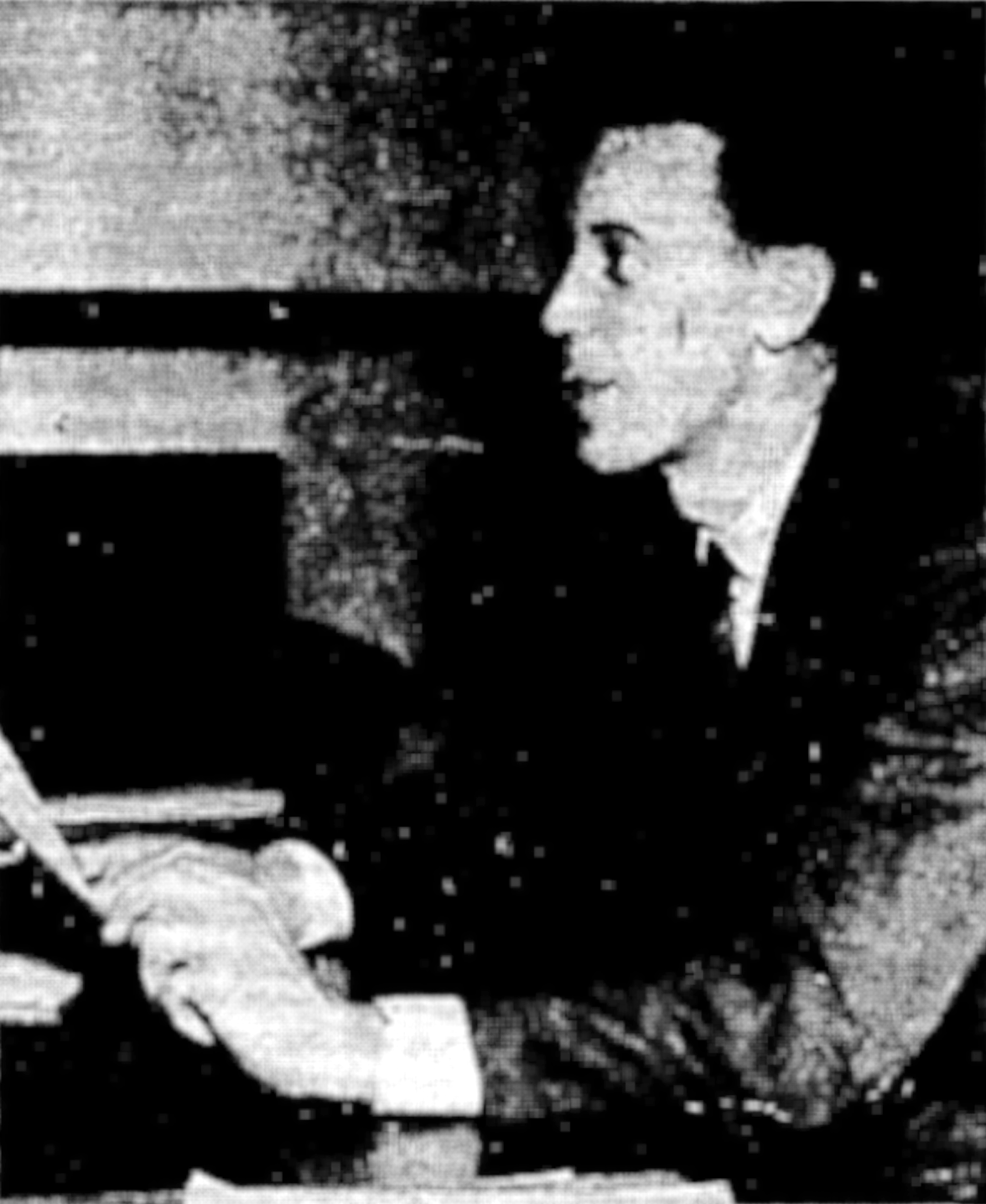
Langley in 1956

William Langley was an American politician. A Democrat, he served as district attorney (D.A.) in Multnomah County, Oregon, and was removed from that office upon his conviction for failure to prosecute gambling.

Langley practiced criminal law with his father, Lotus Langley, who had previously served as Multnomah County D.A. He was also a deputy United States Attorney. In 1950 he ran unsuccessfully for Multnomah County D.A. against Republican John B. McCourt, who had been appointed in 1946.

Langley ran against McCourt again in 1954, this time successfully, in a closely contested election.

In March 1957, he was called before the U.S. Senate's McClellan Commission, which was investigating corruption in organized labor, and refused to answer 90% of questions asked of him, invoking the Fifth Amendment to the United States Constitution. Subsequently, a Multnomah County jury convicted him of failing to prosecute gambling operations. As a result of the conviction, judge Frank J. Lonergan ordered Langley removed from office. Governor Robert D. Holmes appointed Leo Smith to finish Langley's term.

Langley appealed the ruling on the basis that excessive courtroom photography interfered with the trial, but he was unsuccessful in the Oregon Court of Appeals and the Oregon Supreme Court, and the United States Supreme Court declined to hear the case, leaving the original ruling intact. Langley returned to private practice.

Langley had one sister, Mary Manche. He married Janice Graham in August 1940. His aunt, Manche Irene Langley, was a deputy district attorney and one of the first women lawyers in the state.
