= H. Alberta Colclaser =

American lawyer

- H. Alberta Colclaser, from a 1947 newspaper
- Born: Hazel Alberta Colclaser; February 19, 1911; Turtle Creek, Pennsylvania
- Died: July 7, 2010 (aged 99); Wooster, Ohio
- Occupation(s): Lawyer, foreign service officer
- Known for: Specialist in international aviation law

Hazel Alberta Colclaser (February 19, 1911 – July 7, 2010) was an American aviation lawyer and foreign service officer. She was also involved in early efforts to shape space law.

== Early life and education ==
Colclaser was born in Turtle Creek, Pennsylvania, the daughter of Levi (Lee) A. Coclaser and Bertha Margaret Lear Colclaser. She graduated from the College of Wooster in 1933. She earned a Juris Doctor degree from Case Western Reserve University Law School in 1936, and a Master of Laws (LLM) degree from Columbia Law School in 1939, with a focus on international aviation law.

== Career ==
Colclaser worked for the United States Department of State as a specialist in international aviation law for 34 years, beginning in 1939 as an assistant to Green Hackworth. She was a foreign service officer at American embassies in Paris and Ottawa. In Paris for the 1946 Peace Conference, she contributed to the rewriting of international aviation policies for post-World War II Europe. She was the one of three American representatives and the only woman on the legal committee of the International Civil Aviation Organization (ICAO). She was also involved in early federal discussions about space law.

Colclaser was awarded the department's Superior Service Award in 1966, After she retired from government work, she was an administrator at the College of Wooster. She received an honorary doctorate from the College of Wooster in 1965, and was named a Distinguished Alumna of the college in 1983. She was a member of Phi Delta Delta, an organization for women lawyers, and held a pilot's license. In her eighties, she visited Antarctica, and was a volunteer counselor helping other senior citizens with medical bills. She was a life member of the American Society of International Law.

In 1997 she gave an oral history interview to Jane Bickford, for the Columbia University Law School alumnae oral history collection. She established the H. Alberta Colclaser Scholarship Fund at Case Western Reserve University, for women students studying international law.

== Publications ==
- "The New International Civil Aviation Organization" (1945)
- "Jurisdiction in Private International Air Law Cases" (1951)
- "Civil Aviation: Current Legal Problems in the International Field" (1951)
- "The Juridical Status of the Air Space above the Territorial Sea" (1958)

== Personal life ==
Colclasser died in 2010, aged 99 years, near Wooster, Ohio.
