= Emilie Bullowa =

American lawyer (1869–1942)

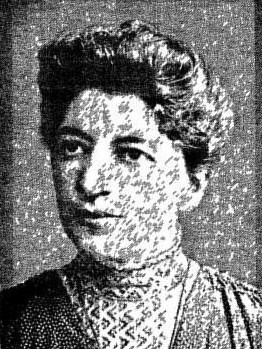
- Born: Emilie Moritz Bullowa; 1869; New York City, U.S.
- Died: October 25, 1942 (aged 73); New York City, U.S.
- Occupation: Lawyer
- Years active: 1900–1941

Emilie Moritz Bullowa (1869 – October 25, 1942) was an American lawyer. She was the first president of the National Association of Women Lawyers. After graduating from the Law College of New York University in 1900, she established a law firm with her brother, specializing in admiralty law. She advocated for women's equality and was a member of the Women Lawyers Association and the Women's City Club of New York. She served on the board of the New York Medical College and Hospital for Women and was its president from 1921 to 1942.

== Early life and education ==
Emilie Moritz Bullowa was born in New York in 1869, the eldest of six children of Mary (née Grunhut) and Morris Bullowa. Her father was a merchant from Lubenec, Czechoslovakia. She attended public school in New York and received private lessons in art, music, and languages. She attended Normal College (now Hunter College). Her parents died sometime before she reached the age of 20 and she cared for her siblings.

She was a member of Kappa Beta Pi, earned a law degree from New York University's Law College in 1900.

== Legal career ==
Bullowa was admitted to the bar and opened the law firm Bullowa and Bullowa on Nassau Street in lower Manhattan with her brother Ferdinand (d. 1919) in 1900. They specialized in admiralty law and among their clients were foreign shipping lines. Bullowa became an accomplished trial lawyer and "established a new point" in libel law in 1919.

Bullowa advocated for equality for women in property rights. Sometime before 1910, while she was legislative chair of the New York State Federation, she said that she was "unable to find a single unimportant inequality in the New York laws governing the property rights of women". Bullowa was also a clubwoman and a member of the Women's City Club in New York.

Bullowa was president of the Women Lawyers Association of New York City from 1916 until 1922. In 1922, she was a founding member and the first president of the National Association of Women Lawyers. She served as president from 1920 to 1924. While she served as president the association held its first national conference in Minneapolis in July 1923.

She chaired various American Bar Association committees. She was on the New York County Lawyers Association's committee on citizenship. She was a judge in a New York Times-sponsored contest for essays on the United States Constitution. She served on the board of the New York Medical College and Hospital for Women and was its president from 1921 to 1942.

Bullowa fought for equal standing for women lawyers and was a member of the Women's Democratic Union platform committee in 1924. She attended a meeting of the British and American Bars in England in 1924 where she met the lawyer Maud Crofts.

== Later life and philanthropy ==
During her career, Bullowa advocated for legal aid, saying "our democracy doesn't work if the people who can't afford to give compensation for legal aid can't get justice. It is just as important to help people in their rights as in their health and their housing." She also offered her services pro bono to clients in need.

After World War I, she donated a French chateau she had inherited to the French War Relief. She adopted several French children orphaned during the war. She later adopted orphaned British children during World War II and gifted a mobile kitchen unit to the British War Relief Society.

Bullowa practiced law until her retirement in 1941. She donated around 2,000 legal volumes that had belonged to her brother to The Legal Aid Society's Criminal Courts branch legal library.

Bullowa died in New York on October 25, 1942. She was 73. She was affiliated with New York's Central Synagogue and served on the Board of Trustees of the Jewish Institute of Religion.

== See also ==
- List of first women lawyers and judges in New York
