= Mercedes Deiz =

American judge

Mercedes Deiz (December 13, 1917 – October 5, 2005) was an American lawyer. She became the first black woman admitted to the Oregon State Bar, and was also the first black woman to serve as a district court judge and the first to be elected as a county circuit court judge.

== Early years ==
The oldest of ten children, Mercedes Deiz (born Mercedes Francis Lopez) was born in New York City in 1917 to Czechoslovak and Cuban parents. Raised in a poor family, she credited her parents' pushing her to spend time at the library and visiting the city museums for her intellectual development. She credited her father, particularly, for "insist[ing] that each of his kids be unique to the best of our abilities." Deiz graduated high school at age 16, and worked as a maid, theater usher, switchboard operator and ticket clerk, and attended Hunter College in New York City. After moving to Portland, Oregon in 1948, she would receive her law degree while studying evenings at the Northwestern School of Law, while working as a legal assistant during the day. Before she entered law school, she was active in Portland's Urban League and the NAACP, partially as a result of her experiences with discriminatory practices by her employers.

== Legal career ==
Mercedes Deiz was admitted to the Oregon bar in 1960 as the first black woman with that honor. Some historical sources list Beatrice Morrow Cannady as the first black woman to practice law in Oregon; however, Cannady never passed the bar examination, having failed on five occasions. Mercedes Deiz worked as a litigator for several years, and also as an administrative law judge for worker's compensation disputes. Deiz would also become the first black female district court judge in Oregon after she was appointed by Governor Tom McCall in 1969. In 1972, she became the first black woman to be elected as a County Circuit Court judge in Oregon, defeating seven other male candidates.

== Lifetime of Service ==
Beginning in 1993, and in recognition of her service and impact on the legal profession, Oregon Women Lawyers, which represents women and minorities in the legal profession, has bestowed the Judge Mercedes Deiz Award upon "an individual who has made an outstanding contribution to promoting minorities in the legal profession and in the community." When she died in 2005, she was praised for her life of dedicated public service, and for her "legendary" mentoring of young lawyers. It was said of Judge Deiz that nearly "every African-American lawyer who entered practice between 1970 and 1992 sat with Judge Deiz in her chambers, receiving a few hours or more of private tutoring in career development." Deiz was posthumously honored by a joint resolution of the Oregon Legislative Assembly in 2007.

== See also ==
- List of African-American jurists
- List of first women lawyers and judges in Oregon
