= Jesse Bullowa =

American medical researcher

Jesse Godrey Moritz Bullowa (October 19, 1879 – November 9, 1943) was an American medical researcher, and an early proponent of controlled clinical trials. From 1928 until his death he was a clinical professor at New York University College of Medicine.

== Early life and education ==
Bullowa was born in New York City on October 19, 1879 to Moritz and Mary (née Grunhut) Bullowa. He graduated from the College of the City of New York (now part of [The City University of New York ]) in 1899 and then received his MD from the College of Physicians and Surgeons in 1903. Bullowa was married on September 24, 1907 to Sadie Nones, with whom he had five children.

== Career ==
In the late 1920s, he was appointed a clinical professor of pulmonary medicine at New York University College of Medicine and joint director of the pulmonary service of Harlem Hospital with Milton Rosenblüth, where he also worked with William Hallock Park. He later consulted at several other New York hospitals. He was a member of the American Trudeau Society and the Society for Experimental Biology and Medicine, and a Fellow of the New York Academy of Medicine.

He conducted a controlled trial of serum treatment of lobar pneumonia, with funding from Lucius Littauer. He used a study design with alternation of patients to serum vs standard treatments, established inclusion criteria and severity scales, approximated an intention-to-treat analysis, and included nearly 800 participants. His work was published in the Journal of the American Medical Association in 1928; this work "reveals a knowledge and use of statistics which was still unusual among medical researchers at that time" and "stands out as one of the most sophisticated invocations of the controlled clinical trial in the 1920s, and as a self-conscious attempt to justify and promote the methodology". Bullowa acknowledged statistician Louis Israel Dublin for help, and introduced a measure of the "ratio of outcome differences between the two groups divided by the square root of the sum of the squares of the two groups' standard errors", arguing that once the ratio was above 2 then the beneficial treatment should be administered to all patients. He later tested sulfa therapy, serum therapy, and combined therapy in 1939, but despite the results favoring sulfa monotherapy he made post-hoc arguments for the benefit of his serum treatment in sub-stratified patient groups.
