= National Association of Women Lawyers =

The National Association of Women Lawyers is a voluntary organization founded in 1899 and based in the United States. Its aim is to promote women lawyers and women's legal rights.

== History ==
The group was originally called the "Women Lawyers' Club", and was founded by 18 female lawyers in New York City in 1899. The group was renamed the "Women Lawyers Association" by 1914, and changed to its current name in 1923.

== Women Lawyers Journal ==
The organization started publishing the Women Lawyers Journal in 1911.

== Notable members ==
- Flora Warren Seymour, an attorney based in Chicago, served as an assistant editor of the Women Lawyers Journal
- Rosalind Goodrich Bates, an attorney based in Los Angeles, served as the editor of the Women Lawyers Journal in 1931 and from 1935-1936.
- Eva M. Mack, editor of Women Lawyers' Journal.
- Emilie Bullowa, an advocate for legal aid, who served as the first president of the national organization from 1916-1922.
- Oda Faulconer: The Women Lawyers Association of Los Angeles was born by the merging of two women's bar organizations: the Women Lawyers' Club, founded in 1918, and the Women Lawyers' Association of Southern California, founded in 1928. The president of the Women Lawyers' Association of Southern California was Mab Copeland Lineman, who was also the 4th President of the Women Lawyers' Club, while Faulconer was the secretary-treasurer. In 1930, when the Association reorganized into the Southern California Council of the National Association of Women Lawyers, Ida May Adams was president and Faulconer vice-president. Faulconer was elected president for two terms, in 1938 and 1939
- Mary Lilly, suffragist and politician, who served as an editor of the Women Lawyers Journal from 1915-1916.
- Nina Miglionico was elected president in 1958 and served as the editor of the Women Lawyers Journal from 1960-1961.
- Kate Pier served as the vice-president for Wisconsin of the National Association of Women Lawyers.
- Lavinia Marian Fleming Poe, the first African American woman lawyer in Virginia, passing the bar exam in 1925.
- Eugénie M. Rayé-Smith, suffragist, who served as the first editor of the Women Lawyers Journal from 1911-1914.
- F. Josephine Stevenson served one year as president of the Women Lawyers' Club, and four years as corresponding secretary.
- Ida V. Wells was the director of the Women Lawyers' Association.
- Olive Stott Gabriel served as the organization's president in the 1930s.
- Rose Zetzer was the first woman admitted to the Maryland State Bar Association.

== See also ==
- National Association of Muslim Lawyers
- National LGBTQ+ Bar Association
- National Negro Bar Association
