= Phi Alpha Delta =

American professional law fraternity

- ΦΑΔ
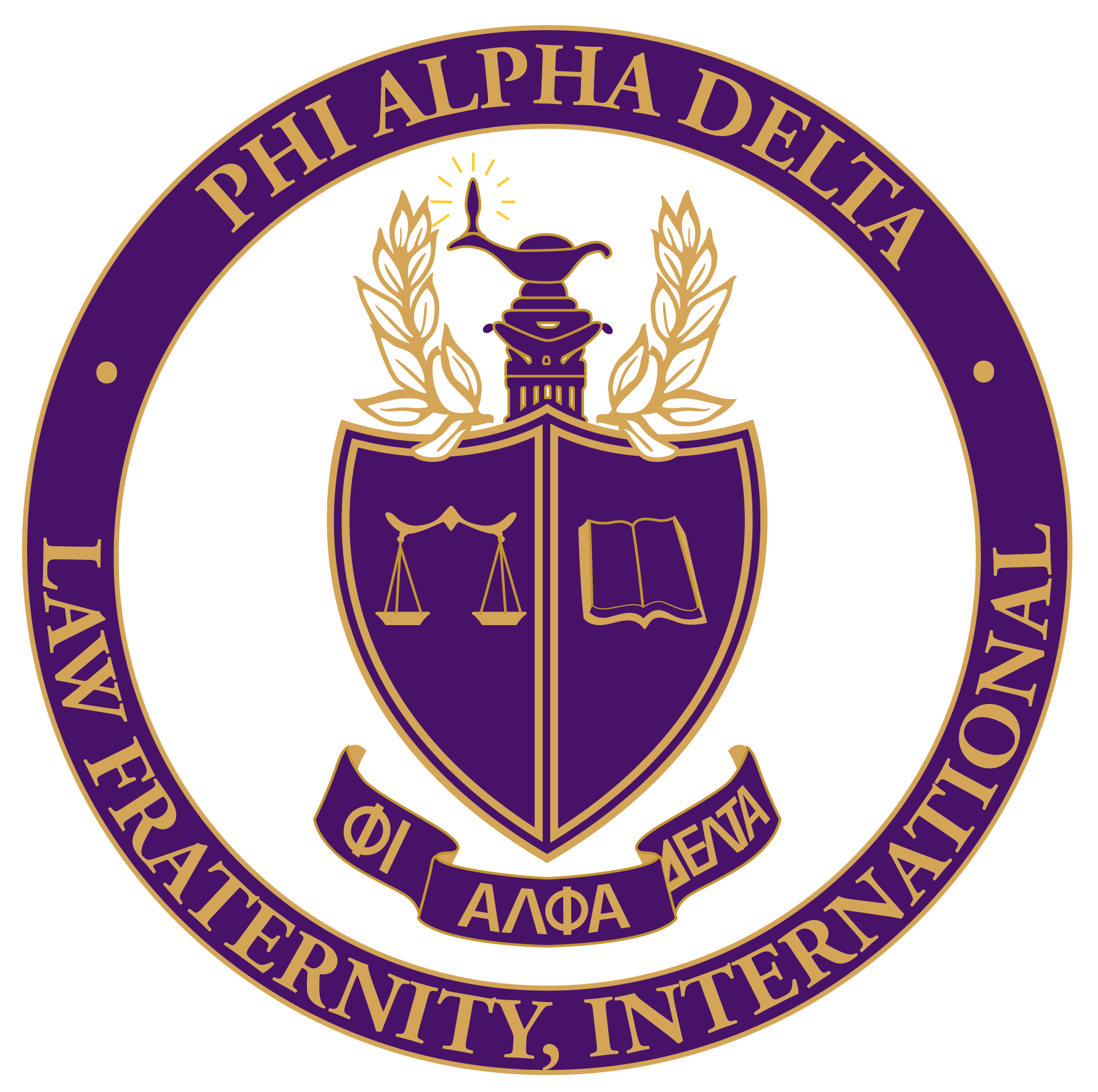
- Founded: November 8, 1902; 123 years ago Chicago, Illinois and South Haven, Michigan
- Type: Professional
- Affiliation: PFA
- Former affiliation: PIC
- Status: Active
- Emphasis: Law
- Scope: North America
- Motto: Philos Adelphos Dikaios' "Love of Humanity and Justice for All"
- Pillars: Compassion, Courage, Diversity, Innovation, Integrity, Professionalism, Service
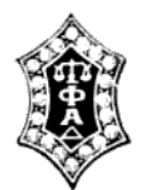
- Member badge
- Colors: Purple and Gold
- Symbol: Book of Law, Lamp of Learning, and Scales of Justice
- Flower: Red Carnation
- Chapters: 206 law school, 316 college pre-law, 99 alumni
- Headquarters: 606 Baltimore Avenue, Suite 303; Towson, Maryland 21204; United States
- Website: www.pad.org

Phi Alpha Delta Law Fraternity, International (ΦΑΔ or P.A.D.) is a North American professional fraternity composed of pre-law and law students, legal educators, attorneys, judges, and government officials. It is one of the largest professional law fraternities in the United States. It was a charter member of the Professional Fraternity Association and its male predecessor the Professional Interfraternity Conference.

== History ==
Formed in Chicago in 1887, their short-lived predecessor Lambda Epsilon informally served law students until November 8, 1902, when the group was reorganized into Phi Alpha Delta at a meeting in South Haven, Michigan.

Phi Alpha Delta was founded to promote professional competency and achievement within the legal profession. P.A.D. was the first law fraternity to admit members of all races, creeds, colors, religions, and national origins. In September 1970, Phi Alpha Delta became the first law fraternity to admit women. In 1972, Phi Delta Delta Law Fraternity for women was, by joint action, merged into Phi Alpha Delta. In 1978, it became a charter member of the Professional Fraternity Association.

P.A.D. is the only law fraternity to admit undergraduate students interested in law. Application for membership to Phi Alpha Delta is available to undergraduate students, law school students, lawyers, judges, and politicians. Today, P.A.D. is one of the world's largest law fraternity, with 206 law school chapters, 99 alum chapters, and 316 pre-law chapters in the United States (including Puerto Rico), Canada, and Mexico.

== Symbols ==
Phi Alpha Delta's badge is an oblong hexagonal shield with concave sides. It has the Greek letters ΦΑΔ, arranged vertically, with the scales of justice above.

The motto of Phi Alpha Delta is Philos Adelphos Dikaios or "Love of Humanity and Justice for All". Its core values or pillars are compassion, courage, diversity, innovation, integrity, professionalism, and service.

The fraternity's colors are old gold and purple. Its symbols are the book of law, the lamp of learning, and the scales of justice. Its flower is the red carnation. The fraternity's flag has a purple field with the coat of arms in gold and border of gold fringe.

== Activities ==
P.A.D. hosts a "Senior Transition Program" aimed to help undergraduate seniors transition from the life of undergraduate studies to law school. It sponsors an annual International Pre-Law Conference and Mock Trial Competition. P.A.D. is the only law fraternity to receive federal funding from the U.S. Department of Justice for its Law-Related Education program.

== Organization and government ==
The supreme governing body of the fraternity is the International Chapter which meets at conventions. The International Chapter is composed of up to two delegates (and alternates) from each active law school and alumni chapter, up to two alumni members-at-large from each district, each District Justice, each International Officer, and each former Supreme or International Justice in attendance. Conventions are convened once every two years, usually in August.

Between conventions, the fraternity is governed by an International Executive Board (I.E.B.) composed of the International Justice, the International Vice Justice, the International Secretary, the International Treasurer, the International Marshall, and four Members-at-Large. An International Tribunal, composed of the Chief Tribune and two Associate Tribunes, holds judicial authority within the Fraternity. All twelve International Officers are elected at Biennial Conventions.

For organizational purposes, the fraternity is geographically divided into 33 districts covering North America. For each district, the International Justice, with the advice and consent of the I.E.B., appoints a District Justice to serve as Regional Coordinator and work with Law School and alumni chapters within their district. Each District Justice may have one or more Assistant District Justice(s) to assist them. District Justices are appointed in volunteer positions.
