= Lezak =

Lezak is a surname. Notable people with the surname include:

- Jason Lezak (born 1975), American swimmer and swimming executive
- Muriel Lezak (1927–2021), American neuropsychologist
- Sidney I. Lezak (1924–2006), American lawyer

== See also ==
- Ležáky
