= 2025–2026 Portland, Oregon, protests =

Series of protests in Oregon, US

2025–2026 Portland protests
- Part of protests against mass deportation during the second Trump administration, and domestic military deployments by the second Trump administration
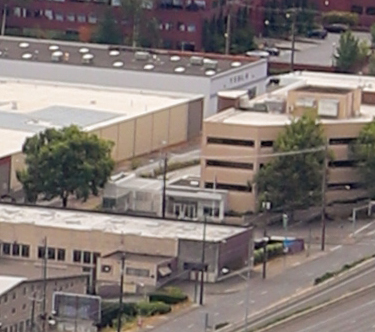
- Immigration and Customs Enforcement's field office in South Waterfront, the primary location of the protests
- Date: June 4, 2025 - present (1 year, 5 months and 6 days)
- Location: South Waterfront; Portland, Oregon U.S.
- Caused by: Deportation
- Methods: Demonstrations; Civil disobedience; Civil unrest; Civil resistance; Traffic obstruction; Internet activism

Parties
Protestors; Abolish ICE; Rose City Antifa; Unaffiliated protestors	State of Oregon; City of Portland; Portland Police Bureau	United States Federal Government; Department of Homeland Security; Immigration and Customs Enforcement

Lead figures
	Tina Kotek; Bob Day	Donald Trump; Pete Hegseth; Kristi Noem

Number
400+ protestors (October 4)		

On June 4, 2025, ongoing protests began in Portland, Oregon in response to Immigration and Customs Enforcement (ICE) operations and presence in the city and surrounding area. The protests began in conjunction with a similar protest in Los Angeles, California. The protests have generally been focused around the immediate vicinity of the ICE field office in Portland's South Waterfront neighborhood, approximately one mile south of downtown.

The protests gained national attention after President Donald Trump referred to the city as "anarchy" during a September 5 press conference and later referred to the city as "war-ravaged" and that federal buildings were “under siege" by Antifa and “other domestic terrorists,” before announcing a plan to send troops and "authorizing full force" on September 28. The Oregon Attorney General's office filed suit, arguing that Trump was "exaggerating the threat of protests against his immigration policies to justify illegally seizing control of state National Guard units." On October 4, 2025, federal judge Karin Immergut blocked the deployment of Oregon National Guardsmen.

On October 5, 2025, Trump announced that he was federalizing up to 400 Texas National Guard personnel to Portland and other locations, as well as about 300 California National Guard personnel. Oregon Attorney General Dan Rayfield and Governor of California Gavin Newsom both filed suit against Trump. A trial is set for October 29. Later that day, Immergut expanded her order to block the deployment of any National Guard personnel, regardless of state.

As of October 2, 128 people have been arrested in conjunction with the protests.

On December 31, Trump officially abandoned plans to deploy the National Guard to Portland.

== Background ==
Protests and movements against ICE have been seen throughout the United States with a major movement seen in Abolish ICE, which gained mainstream traction in June 2018, following the Trump administration family separation policy.

Portland has been declared a sanctuary city since March 22, 2017, when the Portland City Commission unanimously passed Resolution 37277. Oregon became the first sanctuary state in July 1987. Trump's immigration policy elicited concern from Oregon's immigrant community and many local politicians since the beginning of his first term, as Trump warned that sanctuary jurisdictions would be the target of his administration. During his 2024 presidential campaign, Trump said he would use the military to end protests without consent from state governors, actions which his aides had talked him out of during his first term. He also stated he would use the military against "the enemy within".

In early June, four asylum seekers were arrested outside of immigration court in Downtown Portland.

== Events ==
=== June 2025 ===
On June 4, protestors attempted to block a van they believed was delivering a detainee to an ICE holding facility in Tacoma, Washington. Three protestors were detained by federal officers. On the evening of June 7, protestors blocked the driveway of Portland's ICE field office. A Homeland Security contractor in an empty transport van called 911 and notified emergency services. Nearby residents also reported noise complaints. Portland Police Bureau (PPB) officers responded and helped clear the driveway. No arrests were made and no force was used.

On June 8 at approximately 11:40am, the owner of private property adjacent to the ICE office had asked protestors to leave his property. Upon their refusal, he called PPB who sent officers to remove the individuals. After a discussion, officers had convinced the protestors to move to a nearby sidewalk. One arrest was made after a protestor was recognized from a previous unrelated incident. At approximately 7:30pm, a larger crowd had formed. PPB Dialogue Officers attempted to speak with the crowd but they refused. Officers continued to monitor the crowd. At approximately 11:00pm, some protestors began to spray paint the ICE office. Three people were arrested for criminal mischief I, and one was also charged for a previous vandalism of a PPB precinct the year prior. Federal officers also clashed with a group of about two dozen protestors.

On June 11 at approximately 9:50pm, PPB officers, who were monitoring the protest, witnessed a protestor stacking flammable material against the ICE office. Another protestor placed a lit flare onto the material and started a fire. An ICE employee extinguished the fire before significant damage occurred. When officers arrested the two subjects, they were attacked by another protestor. She punched and attempted to choke one of the officers, who was not seriously injured. All three protestors were arrested and booked into the Multnomah County Jail. Later in the night, officers removed a pole that had been placed against the building's main lobby entrance due to the potential life safety issue.

On June 12 and into June 13, hundreds had gathered outside the ICE office, mostly in response to the federal response to a similar protest in Los Angeles. Protestors began spray painting the building's entryway and blocking the driveway with pallets, electric scooters, a dumpster, and various other items. Some protestors began throwing fireworks at the building and lighting a fire near the driveway barricade. PPB officers, including members of the Rapid Response Team, arrived and arrested 10 people. After PPB left, federal officers began firing crowd control munitions into the group of protestors from the building's roof, pushing them away from the barricade.

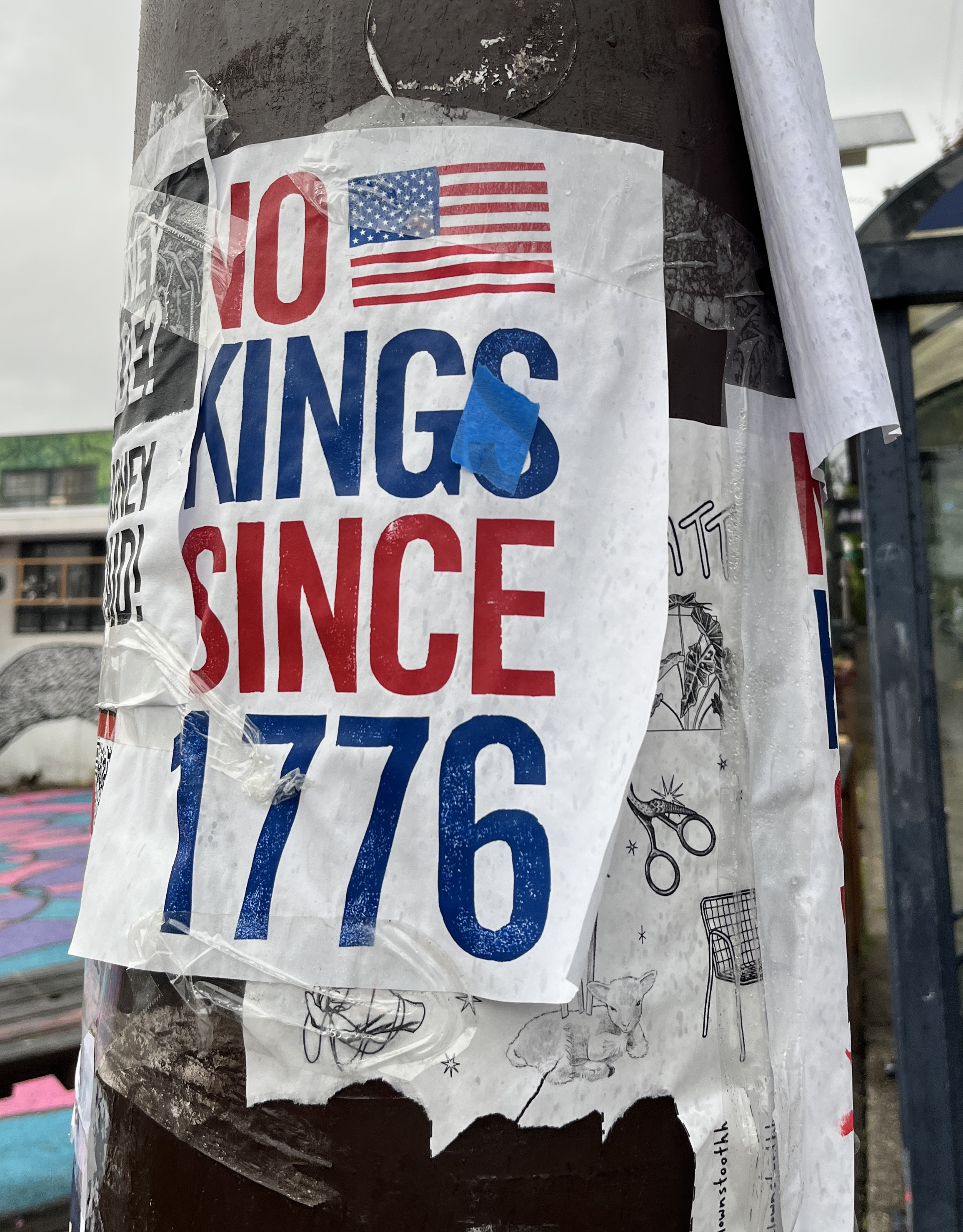
Protest sign in June 2025

Early on June 14, tens of thousands of people participated in the No Kings protests at various locations throughout the Portland area. Towards the end of this protest, some began to gather at the ICE building. Criminal behavior began to occur and PPB dispatched Dialogue Officers, the Rapid Response Team, Mobile Field Forces, the Air Support Unit, and the sound truck. At approximately 5:49pm, a federal officer was assaulted by protestors. PPB officers and medics responded and shortly after. Multiple protestors began to use a stop sign as a battering ram and shattered the front glass door of the building. PPB declared the protest a riot and federal officers deployed smoke, tear gas, flash grenades, and other projectiles. PPB officers made targeted arrests for various criminal activity observed throughout the night. Three arrests were made and all subjects were booked into the Multnomah County Jail. Rose City Antifa and affiliated groups hand out posters with pictures, names, and addresses of local ICE officers.

On June 15, Mayor of Portland Keith Wilson pledged that PPB will "uphold the law in the city, but will 'not be used as agents of ICE.'" He also released a statement in response to federal deployment of National Guard troops to Los Angeles, stating "that Portland 'has not requested and does not require' intervention from the National Guard" and said the city would fight unwarranted federal intervention in court. Eight more protestors are arrested and charged during June 15–18.

On June 24, DHS arrests two protestors. One protestor points a laser pointer at an ICE officer. PPB monitors the area but does not make any arrests. Portland police chief Bob Day tells members of the Portland City Council that his agency is looking at ways to scale back its policing of ICE protests. According to a police activity log, a police team noted during a debrief that "if it were not ICE, we could assist directly."

On June 29, a protestor was arrested for assaulting a federal officer and attempting to damage the ICE building.

=== July–August 2025 ===
On July 4, a large group gathered outside the ICE building. One protestor was arrested for vandalizing the building's guard shack with spray paint, while another was arrested for kicking an officer who was attempting to arrest him. At approximately 11:15pm, as federal officers were clearing protestors from the property, a protestor threw an incendiary device towards the officers which exploded near them. A protestor was arrested for using bolt cutters to attempt to damage a card reader near the building's driveway. He removed fiber optic cables, interrupting the building's internet service, and kicked and punched several officers during his arrest.

On July 8, 2025, the city of Portland released a public statement saying pepper balls, pepper spray, and HC smoke had been used against protesters. In a letter to Kristi Noem sent on October 16, 2025, Portland officials Ron Wyden, Jeffrey A. Merkley, Suzanne Bonamici, Maxine Dexter, and Janelle Bynum cited concerns about the use of HC smoke. HC smoke inhalation can cause severe acute respiratory distress syndrome, and one study found that it can cause permanent liver damage.

On August 13, a protestor is tackled by a federal agent while leading a protest. Other agents swarmed him and deployed tear gas. He was arrested and cited for failure to comply. He is tackled again three days later, and later filed a lawsuit against the DHS. On August 20, United States border czar Tom Homan visited Portland and met with both sworn and nonsworn employees expressing support for them and letting them know that he and President Trump "have their six."

=== September 2025 ===
After a large protest in Downtown Portland on September 1, over 100 people marched from Elizabeth Caruthers Park to the ICE building. Some protestors brought a makeshift guillotine and displayed it near the facility. Federal officers deployed gas and pepper balls after the crowd began to become unruly.

After analyzing data from the federal government, the city of Portland claimed that analysis revealed ICE held detainees overnight or in excess of 12 hours 25 times since October 1, 2024, in violation of a land use agreement only allowing detention under 12 hours. The detentions amounted to about 6 percent of the 418 total detentions in that time. On September 17, the city of Portland ruled that ICE violated their land use agreement. ICE will have the opportunity to respond, and Portland's Permitting & Development Bureau may reconsider ICE's land use approval. The Oregonian released a video of federal agents shoving nonviolent protestors and spraying them with pepper spray.

Reporting by Fox News falsely portrayed the protests by showing clips from 2020 protests in the city as if they were recent. Fox broadcasts also showed the wrong dates for videos and used footage from other cities implied to be in Portland. In other broadcasts hosts described events as "riots" when protests were peaceful and no crimes were charged or violence by protestors alleged.

=== October–December 2025 ===
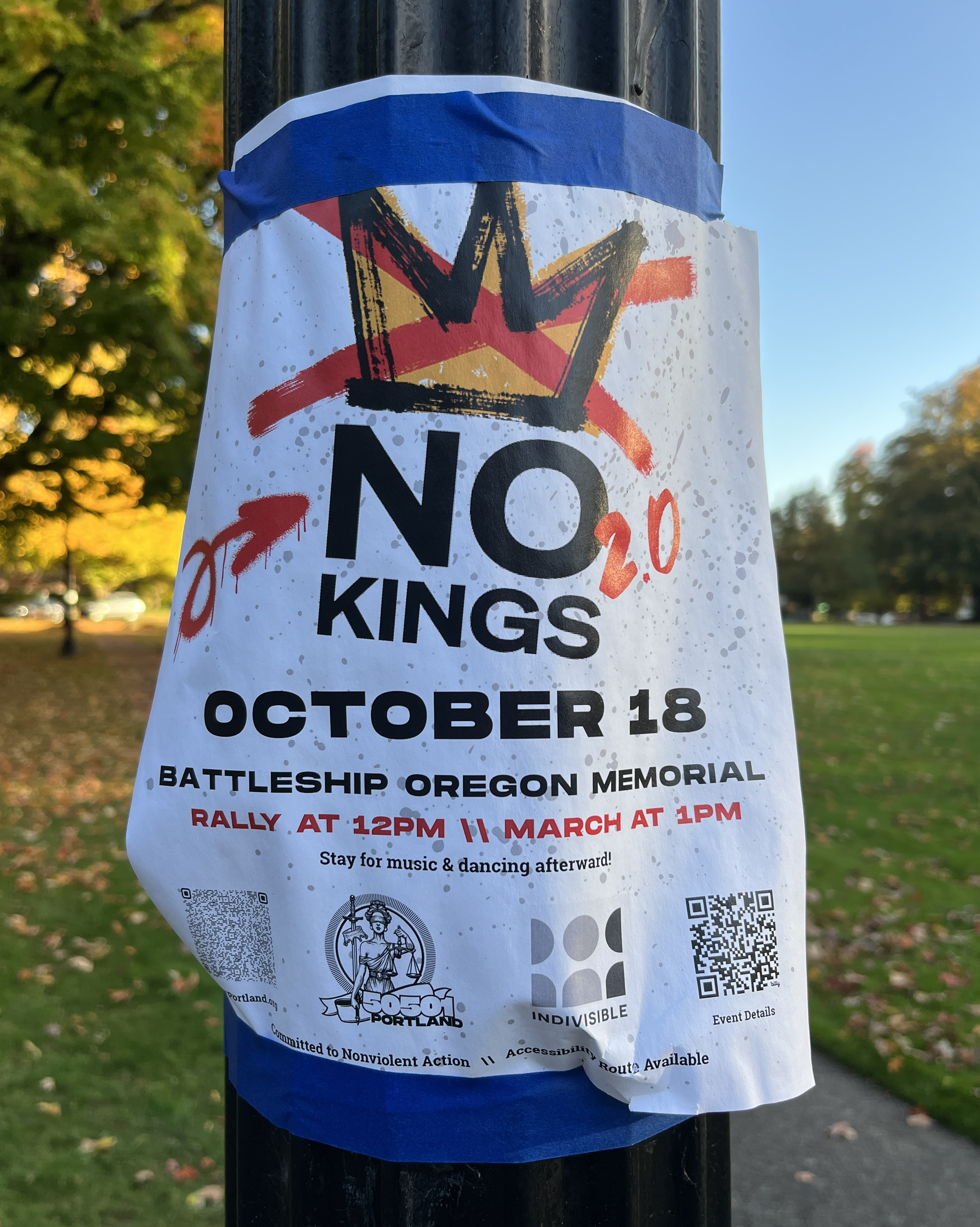
Sign for the No Kings protest in October

Before the judicial blocking of the deployment of the National Guard in Portland, the local Republican Party posted a welcome to the California National Guard on social networks, which contained an image of policemen holding a line against rioters; the image was a composite of old South American photos. The post was later deleted.

Homeland Security Secretary Kristi Noem visited the city and its ICE office on October 8 along with a trio of conservative influencers, Noem's chief of staff, and general counsel. Noem continued with a live report from the top of the building with Fox News explaining her meeting with Oregon Governor Tina Kotek, Mayor Keith Wilson and others. During the interview Noem stated that during her time in Portland she had been dealing with a "bunch of pansies that are elected into political office who won’t make a decision to keep their citizens safe." During her visit about 25 protestors gathered to blast music and wave signs with others gathering to watch. The same building that Noem visited has become site of controversy as local news organizations have alleged that access is being restricted to only outlets like Fox News and conservative content creators such as The Post Millennial.

To protest the Trump administration policies and actions in the city, over a thousand people participated in an "emergency" World Naked Bike Ride on October 12. House Speaker Mike Johnson called the ride the "most threatening thing' he's seen yet". The Unipiper participated. Jordan Klepper of The Daily Show filmed at the event.

On December 31, Trump announced the end of plans to deploy the National Guard to Portland.

=== January - June 2026 ===
On January 8, two people were shot and injured by an ICE agent in Southeast Portland, after the driver allegedly attempted to run them over during a traffic stop. Several groups organized protests after this incident, and the killing of Renée Good. On January 10, over 100 people were arrested around the Portland ICE facility, after a protest in Rose City earlier in the day. Protesters also held a candlelight vigil for those affected by immigration raids at the Terry Schrunk Plaza. On January 24, four more people were arrested outside the ICE facility after more protests were organized over the killing of Alex Pretti.

On March 28, after thousands gathered in downtown Portland for a peaceful "No Kings" protest, a group gathered at the ICE facility. Protesters broke the front gate to the facility and threw "large rocks" at authorities leading to three arrests and the assembly being declared a riot by local police.

On May 1, 2026, several hundred protesters gathered at the ICE facility after a peaceful demonstration downtown. Five protesters were arrested after rocks and bottles were thrown during the demonstration, resulting in injuries to two officers.

Portland officials say at least 86 arrests have been made related to protests at the ICE facility.

== Legal ==
Oregon v. Trump
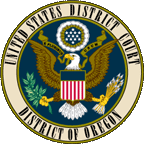
- Court: District of Oregon
- Started: September 28, 2025
- Docket nos.: 3:25-cv-01756 (D. Ore.); 25-6268 (9th Cir.)

Case history
- Appealed to: 9th Circuit

Court membership
- Judge sitting: Karin Immergut

On July 25 in Multnomah County Circuit Court, during a hearing in regards to a lawsuit against the city of Portland regarding enforcement of noise ordinance in the area surrounding the ICE facility, PPB Assistant Chief Craig Dobson testifies that federal police appeared to be instigating some of the clashes that have been occurring. When asked to clarify, he stated "I’m saying that they’re [federal officers] not following best practice.” PPB refused to comment on the testimony.

On August 14, in regards to the noise ordinance lawsuit, Multnomah County Senior Judge Ellen Rosenblum, former Oregon Attorney General, rules that police are not required to enforce noise ordinances, leaving it up to officer discretion.

On October 4, 2025, Judge Karin Immergut of the U.S. District Court for the District of Oregon granted a temporary restraining order blocking the federalization of the Oregon National Guard, and the deployment of National Guard troops to Portland. The order originally lasted through October 17, with further hearings scheduled for October 29. An ICE official testified that the Federal Protective Service (FPS) had been "stretched to the point of collapse", with 115 officers—"a quarter" of the agency's capacity—deployed between June and September 2025 to control the protests. Immergut—who was appointed by Trump in 2019—ruled that lawful protest activity did not constitute a "rebellion" under the Posse Comitatus Act, and that Trump had exceeded his statutory authority under Title 10 of the United States Code. She wrote that Trump's narrative of Portland as a "war-ravaged" city was "untethered to facts", the incidents which did occur were "nowhere near the type of incidents that cannot be handled by regular law enforcement forces", and that "this country has a longstanding and foundational tradition of resistance to government overreach, especially in the form of military intrusion into civil affairs. This historical tradition boils down to a simple proposition: this is a nation of Constitutional law, not martial law."

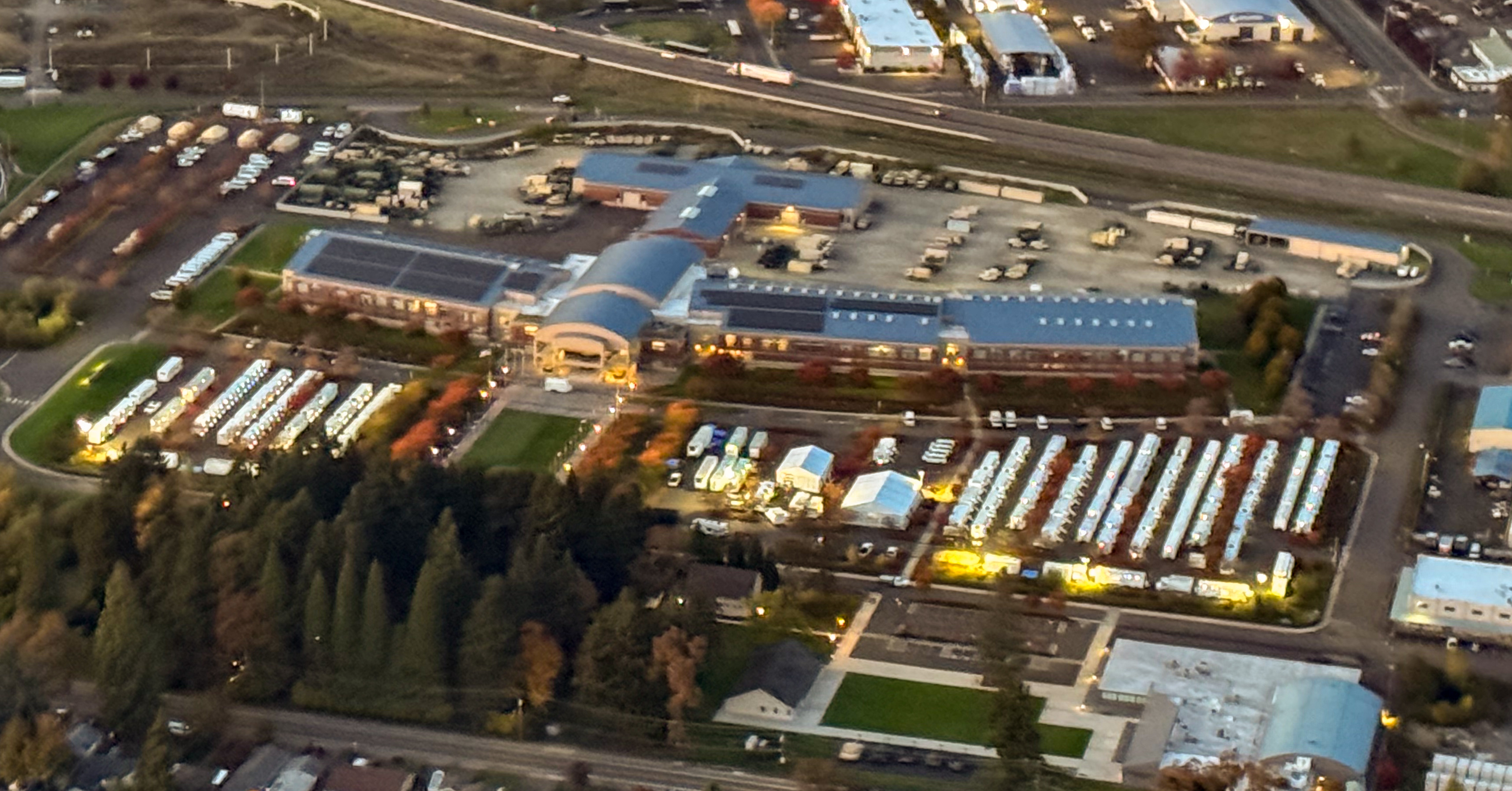
Aerial photo of Camp Withycombe with California National Guard on site in white trailers

On October 5, 2025, the Trump administration announced its intent to federalize and deploy the California and Texas National Guard in Portland instead. Governor of California Gavin Newsom joined Governor Kotek in the city's lawsuit and jointly requested emergency relief. That evening, Judge Immergut granted a second temporary restraining order explicitly prohibiting any deployment of the National Guard to Portland, regardless of origin. She ruled that the attempts to deploy out-of-state forces constituted a contravention of the first TRO.

The federal government subsequently requested an appeal of the first restraining order, with the case assigned to Ninth Circuit Court of Appeals judges Bridget S. Bade. Susan P. Graber, and Ryan D. Nelson. Ahead of oral arguments on October 9, the court issued an administrative stay on the first restraining order, thus allowing troops of the Oregon National Guard to remain federalized pending a ruling, but continuing to prohibit them from being deployed to Portland. On October 15, Immergut issued a procedural ruling to extend the temporary restraining orders by 14 additional days.

On October 20, the Ninth Circuit issued a 2–1 majority decision that overturns the first restraining order. Albeit not addressing or endorsing Trump's claims of Portland being "war-ravaged", Bade and Nelson wrote that "rather than reviewing the President's determination with great deference, the district court substituted its own determination of the relevant facts and circumstances. That approach is error. Even if the President may exaggerate the extent of the problem on social media, this does not change that other facts provide a colorable basis to support the statutory requirement." Graber issued a dissenting opinion, writing that it "erodes core constitutional principles including sovereign States' control over their States' militias and the people's First Amendment rights to assemble and to object to the government's policies and actions." The ruling does not affect the second restraining order, meaning that the National Guard still cannot be deployed to Portland at this time. The ruling also creates a circuit split with the Seventh Circuit, which had blocked the deployment of the National Guard in Chicago under a ruling that claims of a "rebellion" by the administration were exaggerated. Oregon attorney general Dan Rayfield stated that he plans to seek an en banc review.

On October 27, a Department of Justice attorney issued an admission that its testimony had "overstated" the number of FPS officers that were deployed in Portland, stating that only 86 had been deployed, and that the assessment of the deployment using a "quarter" of its capacity was referring to the number of FPS inspectors deployed, and that this only reached 13% of capacity. The amount of FPS officers deployed to Portland was a factor in the Ninth Circuit's majority decision, and had been disputed by the city and state (which had projected that the number officers in Portland never exceeded 31). On October 28, the Ninth Circuit voted to vacate its original decision and rehear the case en banc.

== Reactions ==
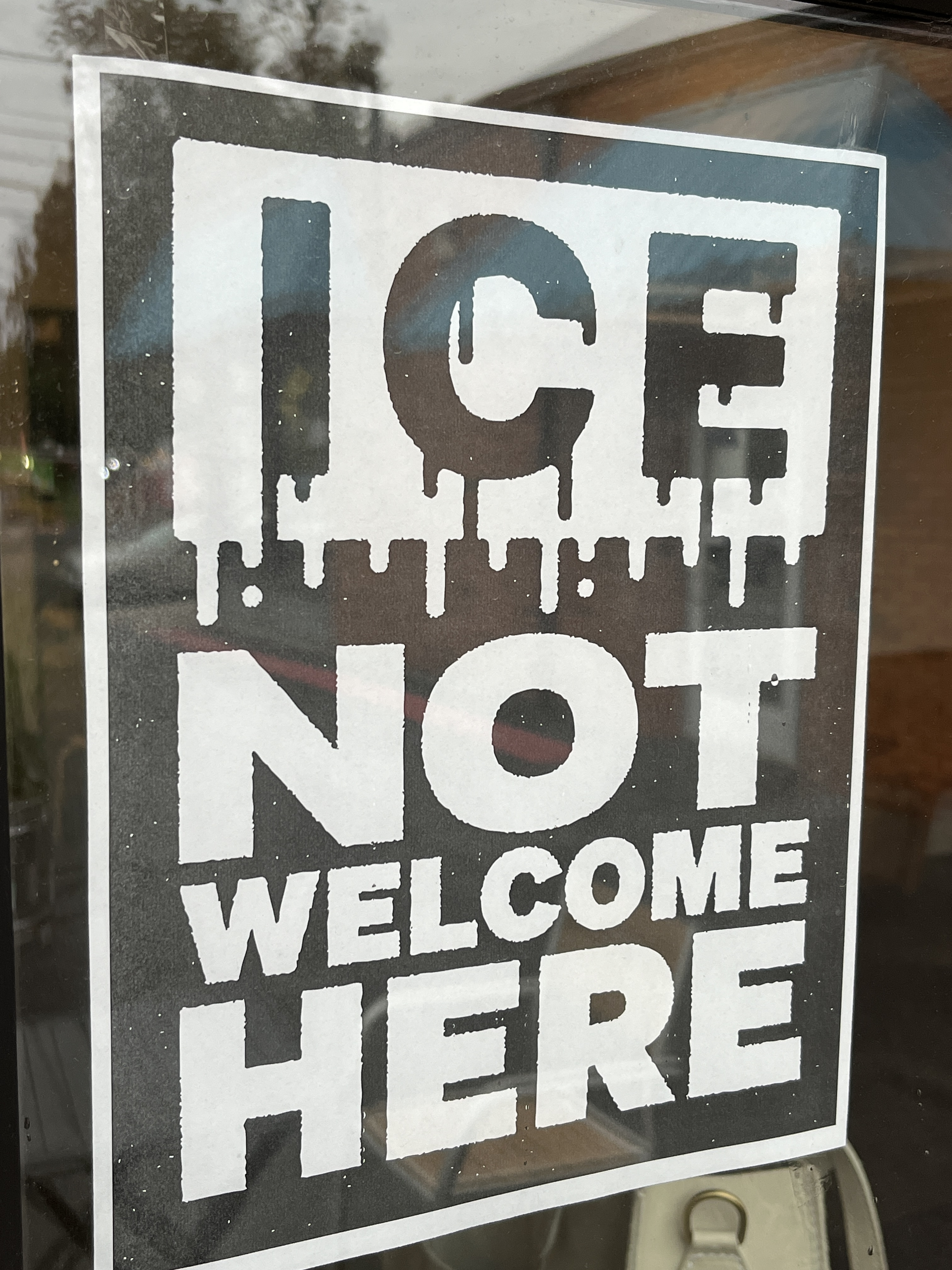
Sign with the text "ICE Not Welcome Here" displayed in the window of a business in southeast Portland, October 2025

On July 11, in response to posters with pictures, names, and addresses of local ICE officers that were handed out at previous protests by Rose City Antifa and affiliated groups, Homeland Security Secretary Kristi Noem promised "swift prosecution" of “anarchist and Antifa-affiliated groups.” The posters were handed out at protests, placed online, and put up fliers in the officers' neighborhoods. In one case, trash was dumped in an officer's property. She stated "We will prosecute those who dox ICE agents to the fullest extent of the law. These criminals are taking the side of vicious cartels and human traffickers. We won’t allow it in America." Noem also criticized Portland's government and other sanctuary cities.

On August 26, US Secretary of Labor Lori Chavez-DeRemer, a former congresswoman who represented part of Portland, complimented Trump on his and ICE's efforts. In response to the protests she stated "we are expecting a crackdown."

During a September 5 press conference, President Trump referred to Portland as "anarchy." He claims that protestors have "ruined that city" and living in Portland is "like living in hell." He said he was weighing federal intervention, including deployment of the National Guard. Governor Tina Kotek responded to the threats of deployment as "absurd, unlawful and un-American." It has been reported that Trump may have been misled by a Fox News segment depicting the 2020 riots. At a September 19 press conference, President Trump asked reporters if they've seen what is happening in Portland. He claimed "this has been going on for years. People out of control and crazy. We’re going to stop that pretty soon." It was demonstrated that a post showing a violent arrest during confrontations between police and protesters, widely circulating on social media by the end of September, used images from 2020.

=== Costumes and Operation Inflation ===
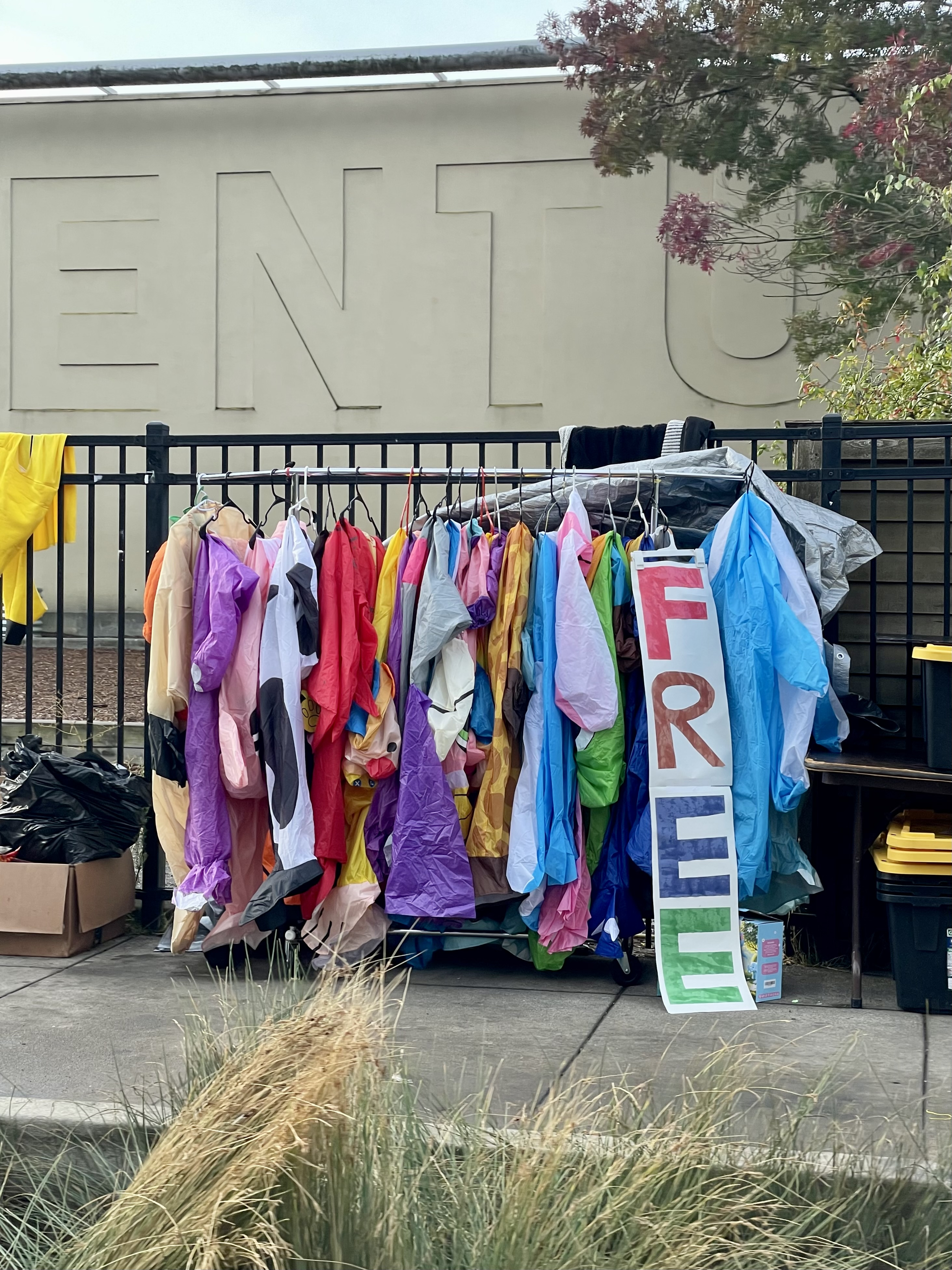
Costumes being given out by Operation Inflation

Many protesters have worn inflatable costumes of various animals, fictional characters, and other items, including axolotls, bananas, capybaras, cats, chickens, cows, dinosaurs, frogs, lobsters, peacocks, polar bears, raccoons, sharks, Stitch, Tigger, and unicorns. According to The Oregonian, approximately 100 people were wearing costumes regularly. One couple got married; the bride wore a unicorn outfit and the groom was dressed as the South Park character Kenny.

According to Oregon Public Broadcasting, "It seemed to start with a person in a bright-yellow chicken suit, who was a regular at the ICE building for months. Then an inflatable frog joined in September. Now, there’s a frog colony, the Pillsbury Doughboy, sharks, squids, ducks and dinosaurs. There are also other whimsical participants and events in what has become the most unique protest scene in America." The absurdist and colorful costumes used by the protesters and their contrast against the federal agents in riot gear has resulted in national coverage, memes, and late-night talk show segments. Jeet Heer of The Nation wrote, "These silly costumes have a serious intent. Trump has painted a terrifying picture of Portland. The boisterous party in the street shows how false his claims are. On an emotional level, they counter Trump's grimness and cultural despair. They refuse to let Trump set the mood for their lives." Salon.com predicted the presence of many "frogs" at the No Kings protests in October. Conservative journalist Andy Ngo said the costumes "serve the function of masking the violent extremism to make the direct action appear like a family-friendly gathering on camera, and to whitewash the past ultraviolence". According to KOIN, the protest has attracted tourists.

One protester launched the Operation Inflation website after seeing federal police confront another protestor and pepper spray the respiratory hole in his inflatable costume on October 2. A TikTok video of the incident received 1.4 million likes. NBC News said "the frog has become a symbol of nonviolent protest". The Hindustan Times said, "Among all the protestors in Portland ... one has captured social media's attention for turning up wearing unusual attire – an inflatable frog costume. Since then, videos and pictures of the protestor, dubbed the Portland Frog, have taken over social media." The Telegraph said the protester "has risen to notoriety" and "become a symbol of resistance". Willamette Week said "the Portland Frog became an icon". The Independent has called Portland's "antifa frog" the unofficial mascot of the No Kings protest movement.

Operation Inflation has distributed approximately 75–100 costumes. Some local restaurants such as Lardo and Scottie's Pizza Parlor offered food and drink specials to guests wearing inflatable costumes.

Protesters in other cities such as Chicago and Cleveland have started wearing inflatable costumes.
