= Timeline of Oregon history =

The following is a timeline of the history of Oregon in the United States of America.

== Pre-European ==
Prior to European colonization of the Americas, Oregon was populated by many Native American groups, including the Bannock, Chasta, Chinook, Kalapuya, Klamath, Molalla, Nez Perce, Takelma, and Umpqua.

=== 16,250 BCE ===
Earliest evidence of human habitation in Oregon; discovered in 2011 at Rimrock Draw Rockshelter near modern-day Riley.

=== 13,200 BCE ===
There is evidence of human habitation in Oregon during this period at Fort Rock Cave in modern day Lake County.

=== 13,000–11,000 BCE ===
The Missoula floods inundate and scour large portions of the state along the Columbia River and in the Willamette Valley before entering the Pacific Ocean.

=== 10,000 BCE ===
There is evidence of humans living in the Paisley Caves.

=== 5,677 BCE ===
Mount Mazama suffers a major volcanic eruption, forming the caldera to later be filled by Crater Lake.

== 16th to 18th centuries ==
=== 1542 ===
A Spanish expedition led by Juan Rodríguez Cabrillo explores north along the West Coast of North America, possibly reaching present-day Oregon before turning back.

=== 1565–1700s ===
Spanish explorers originating from the Philippines reach the West Coast of North America. Most landed in California, but some shipwrecked along the Oregon Coast.

=== 1579 ===
June 5 – Francis Drake, exploring for Britain, lands near Coos Bay.

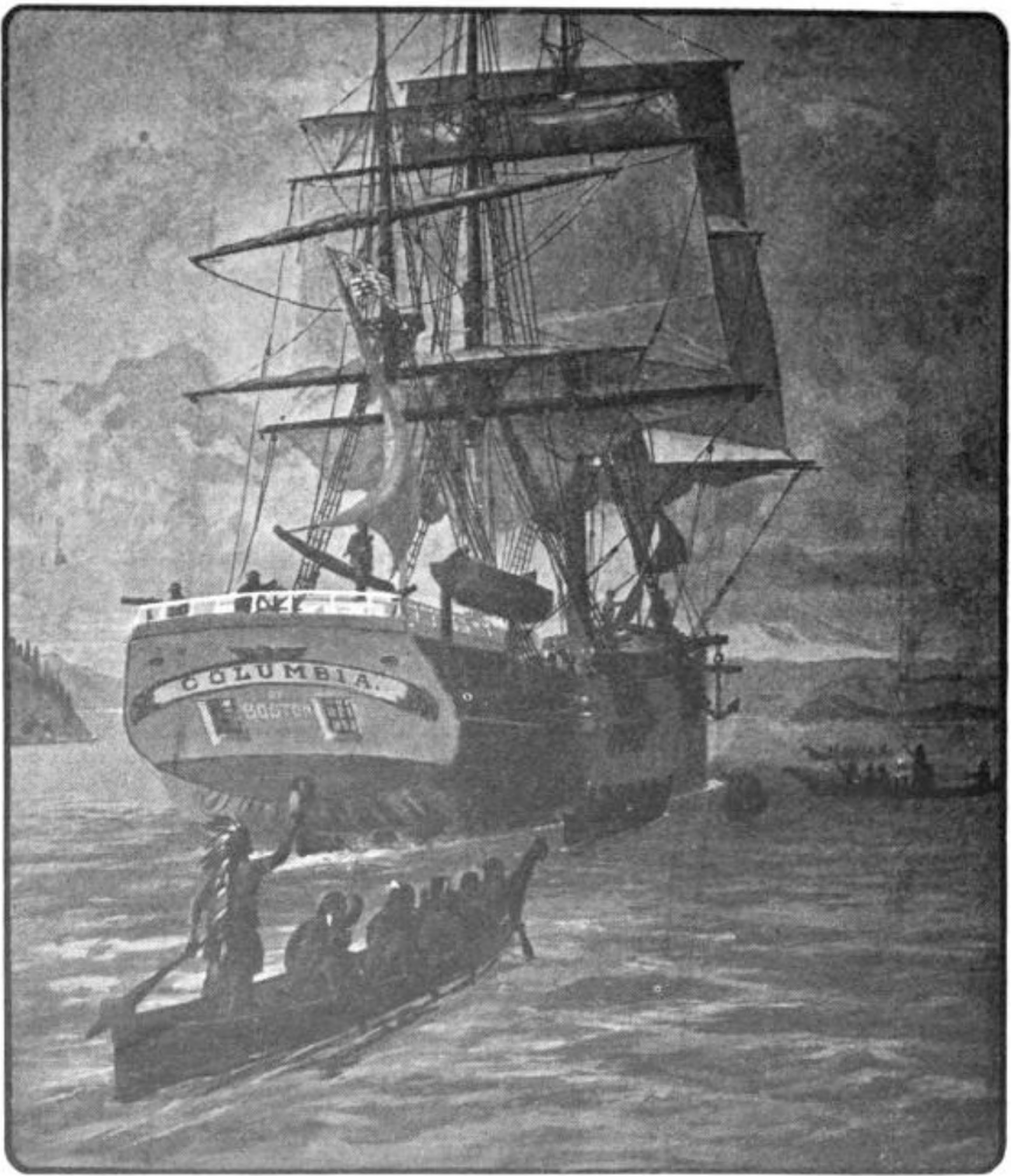
Columbia Rediviva captained by Robert Gray, the namesake of the Columbia River

=== 1592 ===
Greek explorer Juan de Fuca explores the Oregon Coast for Spain, possibly reaching the strait named for him in Washington and British Columbia.

=== 1700 ===
January 26 – An earthquake with an estimated moment magnitude of 8.7–9.2 strikes the region, causing damage to native settlements and sending a tsunami across the Pacific.

=== 1774 ===
Juan José Pérez Hernández, exploring for Spain, is the first European to note Yaquina Head.

=== 1775 ===
Bruno de Heceta, exploring for Spain, is the first European to sight the Columbia River but is unable to enter.

=== 1778 ===
James Cook, exploring for Great Britain, explores the Oregon Coast on his third voyage.

=== 1780s ===
Fur trading between the Europeans and Native Americans begins along the Coast.

=== 1792 ===
George Vancouver explores for Britain, sighting and naming several Cascade volcanoes and other geographic features.

Robert Gray, an American, explores and names the Columbia River.

== 19th century ==
=== 1805 ===
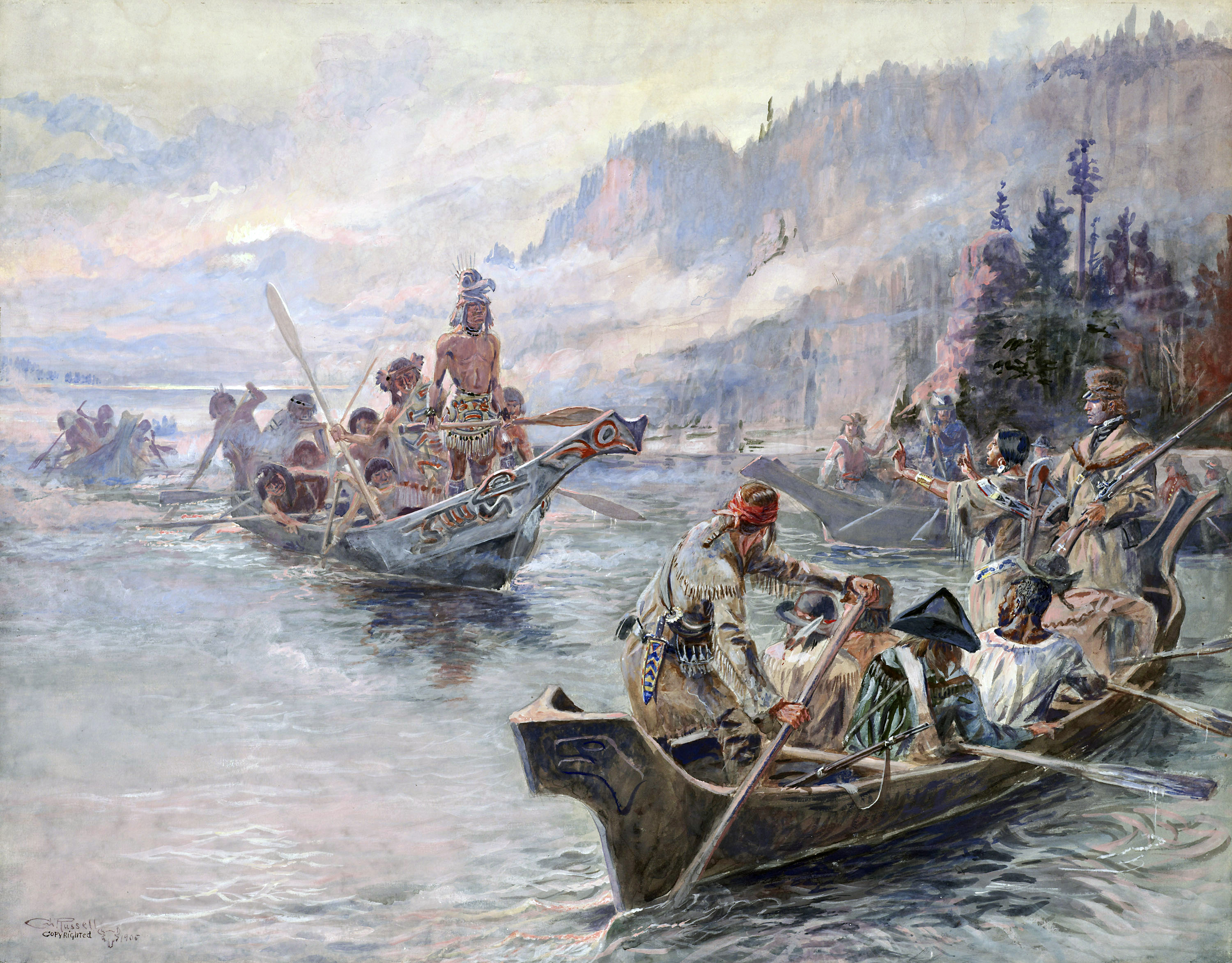
Corps of Discovery meet Chinooks on the Lower Columbia, October 1805 (Charles Marion Russel, c. 1905)

The Lewis and Clark Expedition explores present day Oregon along the Snake and Columbia Rivers, wintering at Fort Clatsop into 1806.

=== 1811 ===
David Thompson becomes the first European to navigate the entire length of the Columbia River.

John Jacob Astor's Pacific Fur Company founds Fort Astoria, which would later become the city of Astoria. This was the first American-owned settlement on the North American west coast.

=== 1812 ===
October 22 – Robert Stuart, returning east from Fort Astoria, discovers South Pass which would later be traversed by the Oregon Trail, Mormon Trail, and California Trail.

=== 1813 ===
Fort Astoria is sold to the North West Company and becomes headquarters for the Columbia District, the British authority in the region.

=== 1818 ===
October 20 – The Treaty of 1818 is signed, allowing for joint occupation of Oregon Country by the United Kingdom and United States.

=== 1819 ===
Missionaries from the Church of England, sponsored by the North West Company, arrive in Oregon Country.

February 22 – The Adams-Onis Treaty is signed between the United States and Spain, which includes Spain withdrawing its claim to the Pacific Northwest.

=== 1821 ===
The North West Company merges with the Hudson's Bay Company, with the latter becoming the British authority in the region.

=== 1824 ===
Fort Vancouver in present day Vancouver, Washington becomes the Hudson's Bay Company's Columbia District headquarters.

=== 1830s ===
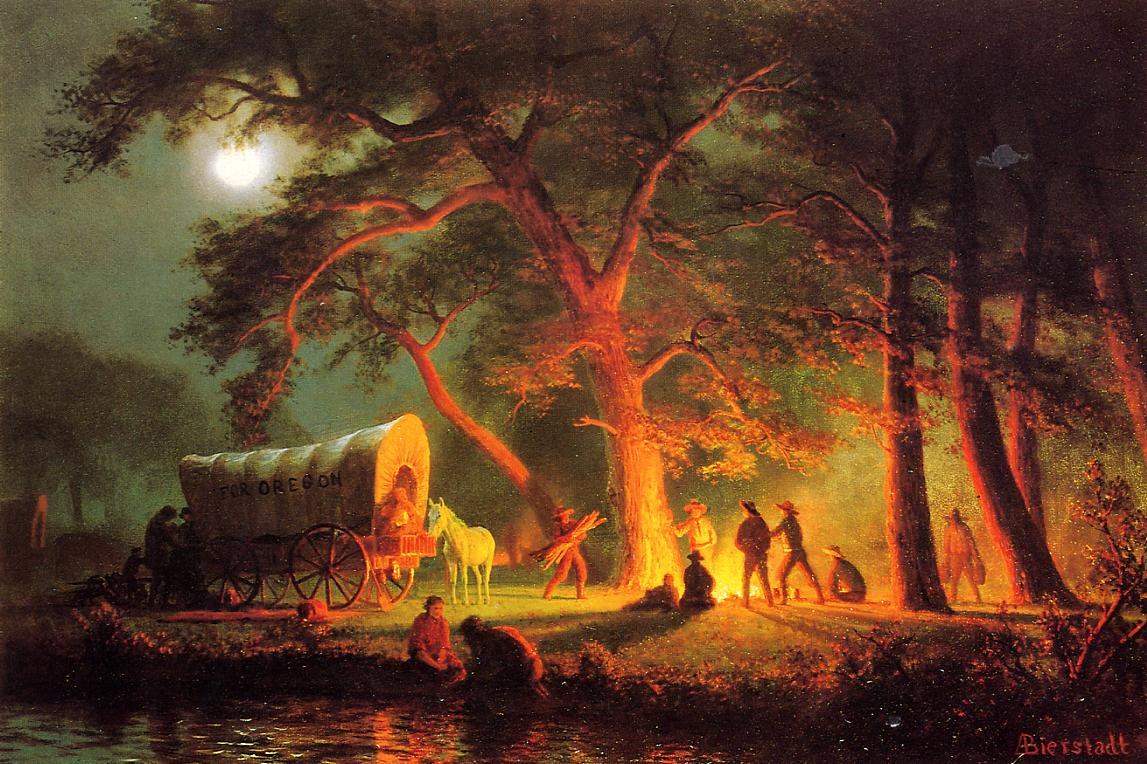
Oregon Trail, painting by Albert Bierstadt, c. 1863

1830s – Pioneers from the United States begin coming to Oregon via the Oregon Trail. Transportation improvements brought declines in wagon traffic on the trail in the 1850s and 1860s, but the trail continued to be in use as late as the 1890s.

=== 1843 ===
Champoeg, a settlement in the Willamette Valley becomes the American capital of Oregon Country.

Hudson's Bay Company moves their Columbia District headquarters to Fort Victoria in the present day British Columbia city of the same name.

Oregon City becomes the American capital of Oregon Country.

=== 1844 ===
June 24 – A law is enacted to limit settlement of African Americans in Oregon Country including them being lashed every six months. Portions of this law were repealed that December.

=== 1845 ===
Portland is founded. It would later become the state's largest city.

=== 1846 ===
June 15 – The Oregon Treaty between the United Kingdom and United States is signed, setting the boundary between the two nations occupying Oregon Country at the 49th parallel and placing present day Washington in Oregon Territory.

=== 1847 ===
November 29 – The Whitman massacre occurs near present-day Walla Walla, Washington, starting the initial phase of the Cayuse War which took place throughout the Northwest and lasted until 1853.

=== 1851 ===
Salem becomes the capital of Oregon Territory.

=== 1853 ===
March 2 – Washington Territory splits from Oregon Territory, taking with it areas north of the Columbia River (west of Wallula Gap) and the 46th parallel.

=== 1855 ===
October – A volunteer militia attacks a group of Takelma people who returned to an ancestral village, sparking the Rogue River Wars which lasted into 1856.

=== 1858 ===
The first railroad in Oregon, operated by the Cascade Railroad Company, serves the Columbia River Gorge.

=== 1859 ===
February 14 – Oregon is granted statehood with its present boundaries. The remaining portion of the territory to the east of the present state is added to Washington Territory.

=== 1862 ===
April – The 1st Oregon Cavalry Regiment is formed to protect Oregon and surrounding areas during the American Civil War.

=== 1868 ===
Oregon State University is founded.

=== 1873 ===
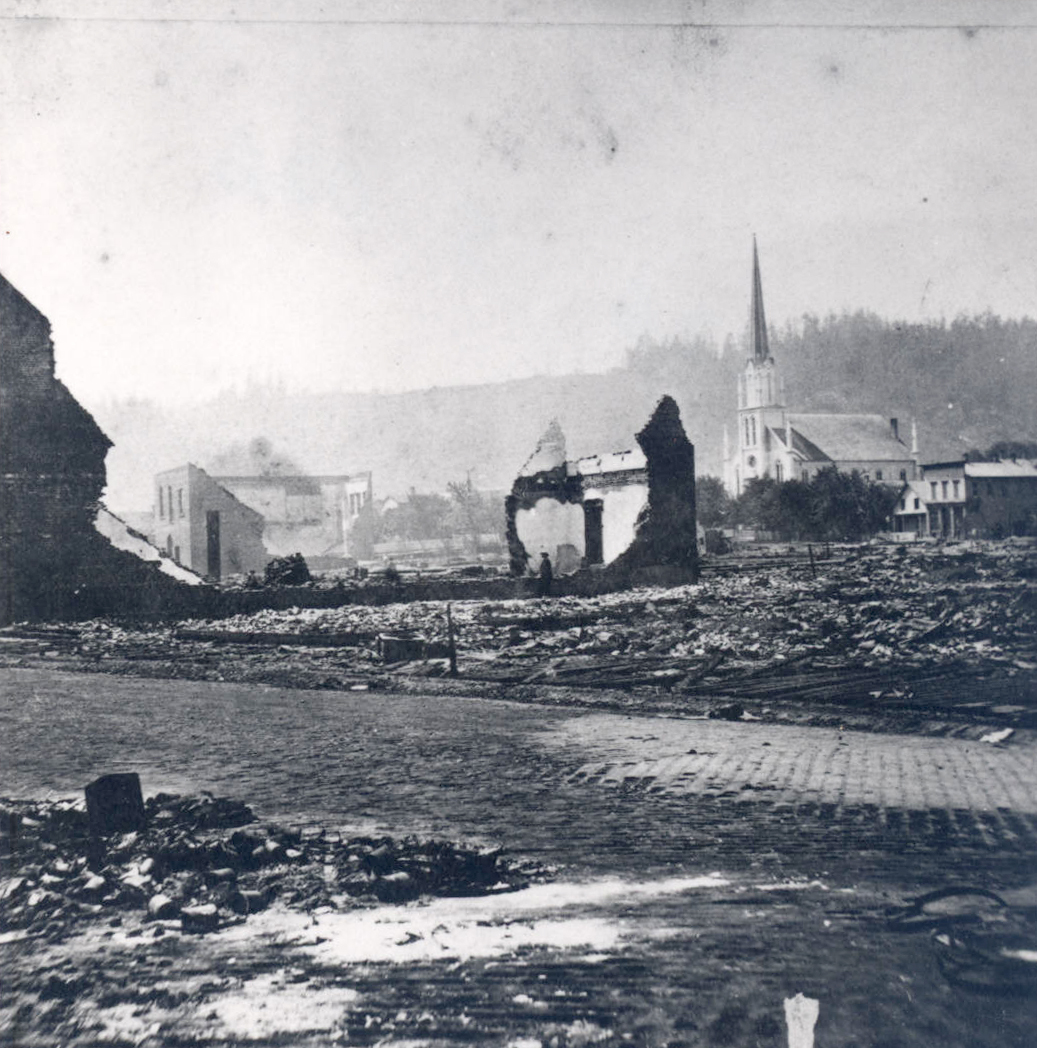
Great Fire of 1873, Portland, Oregon

A lock and canal is built to bypass Willamette Falls, allowing boat traffic to pass between the sections of the Willamette River above and below the falls.

A fire destroys twenty-two blocks of downtown Portland.

=== 1876 ===
The University of Oregon is established.

=== 1877 ===
The Nez Perce War takes place in the Inland Northwest, including parts of Northeast Oregon.

=== 1880 ===
The Oregon Railway and Navigation Company completes a rail line connecting Oregon to the transcontinental railroad system.

=== 1885–1886 ===
Violent mobs drove Chinese immigrants out of small communities throughout Oregon with many people relocating to Portland's Chinatown.

=== 1887 ===
April 9: The original Morrison Bridge in Portland opens, becoming the first bridge to cross the Willamette River.

=== 1888 ===
The Portland Zoo is founded, later changing names to the Oregon Zoo. It was the first zoo west of the Mississippi River in North America.

== 20th century ==
=== 1902 ===
May 22 – Crater Lake National Park is established.

=== 1905 ===
The Lewis and Clark Centennial Exposition is held in Northwest Portland.

=== 1917 ===
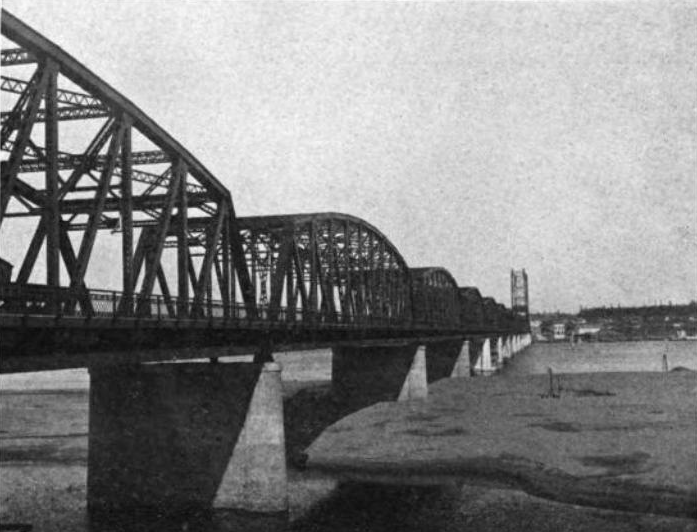
Interstate Bridge looking north from Oregon, 1917

Oregon's original state highway system is created.

February 14 – The Interstate Bridge, which now carries Interstate 5, opens. This was the first bridge across the Columbia River connecting Portland to Vancouver, Washington.

=== 1936 ===
Portland-Columbia Airport opens, later becoming Portland International Airport.

July 15 – The State Line earthquake, centered near Milton-Freewater, Oregon, causes damage in Umatilla County.

=== 1937 ===
Bonneville Dam on the Columbia River east of Portland begins to operate. It was the second dam built on the Columbia River, and the first built on a stretch of the river in Oregon.

=== 1938 ===
A team of archaeologists begin excavating the Paisley Caves.

=== 1940 ===
The U.S. Census records a population of over one million in Oregon for the first time.

=== 1942 ===
June 21 – A Japanese submarine fires on Fort Stevens near Astoria. This was the only time a military base in the contiguous United States was attacked by the Axis powers during World War II. Despite only causing minor damage, it helps spark fears that Japan will invade the West Coast.

September 9 – Japanese pilots drop two incendiary bombs in Siskiyou National Forest in Southwest Oregon in an attempt to start a forest fire. Damage is minimal.

=== 1945 ===
May 5 – A Japanese balloon bomb explodes in Lake County, killing six. These are the only people on American soil whose deaths are attributed to an enemy balloon bomb explosion during World War II.

=== 1948 ===
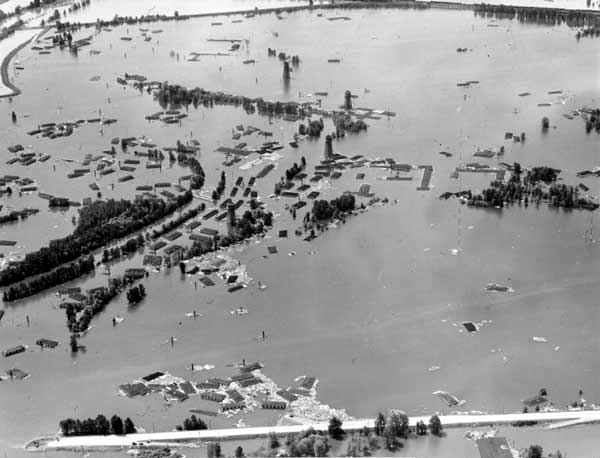
Aerial view of the Vanport flood, looking west from North Denver Avenue on June 15, 1948

The Columbia River floods, destroying the community of Vanport, the second largest city in Oregon at the time.

=== 1962 ===
The remnants of Typhoon Freda strike the Pacific Northwest, causing a total of 46 deaths and $230 million (1962 USD) in damage.

=== 1964–1965 ===
Widespread flooding in December and January, including the Willamette River which inundated over 100,000 acres (40,000 ha).

=== 1967 ===
March 10 – West Coast Airlines Flight 720 crashes, killing all 4 people on board.

July 6 – Governor Tom McCall signs the Oregon Beach Bill, establishing Oregon beaches as public land.

=== 1968 ===
The population of Oregon reaches 2 million.

=== 1969 ===
July 8 – Judge Robert C. Belloni's decision on Sohappy v. Smith establishes fishing rights with minimal restrictions for Native Americans in Oregon.

=== 1970 ===
The U.S. Census records one million residents in the Portland metropolitan area for the first time.

November 12 – The carcass of a sperm whale that appeared on a beach at Florence a few days earlier is detonated by the Oregon Department of Transportation.

=== 1972 ===
October – The Oregon Bottle Bill comes into effect. It is a container-deposit law; it adds a fee to some bottled products, and the fee is refunded to customers when they return the bottles to recycling centers. This is the first such law in the U.S.

=== 1984 ===
August–October – Followers of Rajneesh who settled in Wasco County infect 751 people after contaminating salad bars in The Dalles with Salmonella in an attempt to limit the number of people who vote in that year's election, thus giving their candidates a better chance of winning. This was the first and remains the largest act of bioterrorism in the United States.

=== 1985 ===
Rajneeshee assassination plot and Byron v. Rajneesh Foundation International decision

April – The Oregon Lottery begins operation.

=== 1990 ===
November 6 – Voters approve Oregon Ballot Measure 5, establishing a property tax in the state.

=== 1993 ===
The population of Oregon reaches 3 million.

=== 1996 ===
February – Heavy rain on existing snowpack causes regional flooding that produces $700-800 million (1996 USD) worth of damage throughout the Pacific Northwest.

=== 1998 ===
November 3 – Oregon voters pass a measure to expand the vote by mail system to have it used in all elections.

== 21st century ==
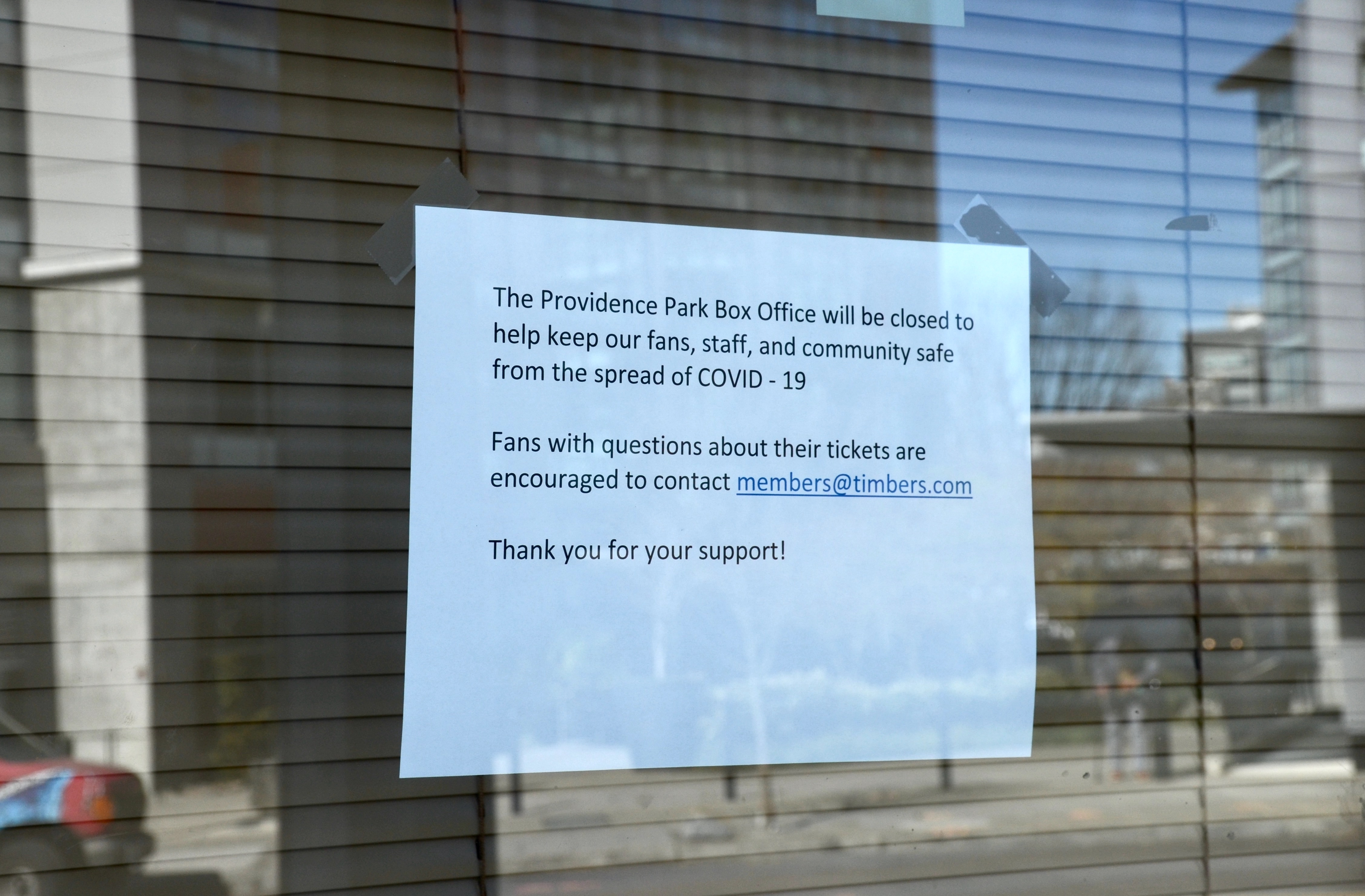
Notice posted at Providence Park indicating the stadium's closure to help prevent the spread of the coronavirus

=== 2014 ===
May 19 – Oregon's ban on same-sex marriage is struck down by a federal court.

=== 2015 ===
The population of Oregon reaches 4 million.

=== 2016 ===
January–February – An armed far-right group led by Ammon Bundy takes control of and occupies the Malheur National Wildlife Refuge in Harney County.

=== 2020 ===
The COVID-19 pandemic impacts Oregon, leading to closures of many services to limit the spread of the virus.

=== 2022 ===
July – The World Athletics Championships are held in Eugene.

== See also ==
- Bibliography of Oregon history
- List of Oregon ballot measures
- List of Oregon state legislatures
- List of years in Oregon
- Timeline of Portland, Oregon
