= Malcolm F. Marsh =

American judge (1928–2025)

Senior Judge of the United States District Court for the District of Oregon
- In office April 16, 1998 – March 15, 2025

Judge of the United States District Court for the District of Oregon
- In office March 24, 1987 – April 16, 1998
- Appointed by: Ronald Reagan
- Preceded by: Edward Leavy
- Succeeded by: Anna J. Brown

Personal details
- Born: Malcolm Francis Marsh; September 24, 1928 Portland, Oregon, U.S.
- Died: March 15, 2025 (aged 96)
- Education: University of Oregon (BS, LLB)

Malcolm Francis Marsh (September 24, 1928 – March 15, 2025) was an American attorney and jurist who was a United States district judge of the United States District Court for the District of Oregon. A native of Oregon, he served as an active judge for eleven years and was in private legal practice in Salem before that.

== Early life and education ==
Marsh was born in Portland, Oregon, on September 24, 1928, the son of lawyer Francis Marsh. His father's twin brother was Eugene E. Marsh, onetime Speaker of the Oregon House of Representatives and President of the Oregon State Senate. Both brothers served as president of the Oregon State Bar. The family moved to McMinnville southwest of Portland in 1935. In 1946, he joined the United States Army, and served as a corporal in Japan until discharge in 1947.

After returning to Oregon, he enrolled at the University of Oregon in Eugene, where he graduated with a Bachelor of Science degree in 1951. Marsh then attended the University of Oregon School of Law, and graduated in 1954 with a Bachelor of Laws.

== Career ==
After graduating from law school, Marsh entered private practice in McMinnville, working for his father. Later in 1954, he moved to Salem where he partnered with Ned Clark and specialized as a trial attorney in products liability. He was inducted into the American College of Trial Lawyers in 1979. In 1983, he was named Salem's First Citizen.

=== Federal judicial service ===
While in Salem he became friends with later United States Senator Mark Hatfield in the 1950s, and remained in private practice in the city until 1987. The friendship with Hatfield helped lead to President Ronald Reagan nominating Marsh for a judgeship on the United States District Court for the District of Oregon in 1987 after Edward Leavy moved to the Ninth Circuit. Nominated on February 2, 1987, he was confirmed by the United States Senate on March 20, 1987, and received his commission on March 24, 1987, for the Portland-based court. On April 16, 1998, Marsh assumed senior status. His service terminated on March 15, 2025, due to his death; he was 96.

=== Notable cases ===
Marsh oversaw the legal proceedings by the federal government against the State of Oregon over the Fairview Training Center in Salem in the late 1980s. In 1989 and 1990 he presided over two lawsuits by the NBA against the Oregon Lottery over the lottery's Sports Action games. He also was the judge in several legal proceedings in the late 1980s and early 1990s over logging on federal lands.

In February 1992, the Oregon Republican Party sued the Oregon Secretary of State to force all Oregon Senate seats to be contested in the 1992 election following redistricting from the 1990 Census. Marsh heard the case and ruled for the state, saying the state did not need to hold all the elections in one year and could retain the staggered system. Later in 1992, he presided over the lawsuit against the Vernonia School District for the district's random drug testing policy. In the case, Marsh ruled the testing policy was constitutional, but was overturned by the United States Circuit Court for the Ninth Circuit, which in turn was overturned on appeal by the Supreme Court.

Over several years Marsh presided over several cases concerning salmon. This included later oversight of the Sohappy v. Smith case concerning tribal rights to salmon runs in the Pacific Northwest. He also heard the first challenges to the dams on the Columbia River under the Endangered Species Act after some salmon runs were listed as endangered.

Marsh presided over the 1995 trial of several former followers of the Bhagwan Shree Rajneesh after their failed assassination plot against U.S. Attorney for Oregon Charles H. Turner. Turner had investigated the Rajneeshees and their activities including their bioterror attack. At trial two Rajneeshees were found guilty in the plot and Marsh sentenced them to five years in prison. He later sentenced another conspirator to five years of probation for their role in the plot.

Marsh was the main person from the judiciary involved with the design of the new Mark O. Hatfield United States Courthouse. He worked with the General Services Administration to design the 16-story, and nearly $130 million building to ensure adequate space for 30 years. In 1997, he oversaw the move of the court to the new Hatfield Courthouse.

== Personal life and death ==
In 1953, Marsh married the former Shari Long. They had three children. Marsh died on March 15, 2025, at the age of 96.

Legal offices
Preceded by Edward Leavy	Judge of the United States District Court for the District of Oregon; 1987–1998	Succeeded by Anna J. Brown
