= United States v. Oregon =

United States v. Oregon may refer to:

- United States v. Oregon, 295 U.S. 1 (1935)
- United States v. Oregon, 366 U.S. 643 (1961)
- A case that was combined with Sohappy v. Smith (302 F.Supp. 899), a 1969 United States federal district court case concerning fishing rights of Native Americans. (See United States v. Washington for further info.)
- Gonzales v. Oregon, a 2006 United States Supreme Court case in which the United States Department of Justice unsuccessfully challenged the Oregon Death with Dignity Act
