= Susan P. Graber =

American attorney and jurist (born 1949)

Susan Graber
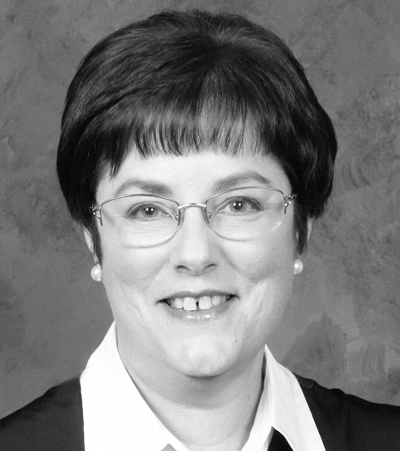

Senior Judge of the United States Court of Appeals for the Ninth Circuit
- Incumbent
- Assumed office December 15, 2021

Judge of the United States Court of Appeals for the Ninth Circuit
- In office April 1, 1998 – December 15, 2021
- Appointed by: Bill Clinton
- Preceded by: Edward Leavy
- Succeeded by: Jennifer Sung

Justice of the Oregon Supreme Court
- In office May 2, 1990 – April 1, 1998
- Appointed by: Neil Goldschmidt
- Preceded by: Robert Jones
- Succeeded by: R. William Riggs

Personal details
- Born: 1949 (age 76–77) Oklahoma City, Oklahoma, U.S.
- Party: Democratic
- Education: Wellesley College (BA); Yale University (JD)

Susan Pia Graber (born 1949) is an American attorney and jurist. She is a senior United States circuit judge of the United States Court of Appeals for the Ninth Circuit. A native of Oklahoma, she was the 90th justice of the Oregon Supreme Court from 1990 to 1998. She served on the Oregon Court of Appeals from 1988 to 1990.

== Early life ==
Graber was born in Oklahoma City, Oklahoma to a Jewish family. After high school Graber attended Wellesley College in Wellesley, Massachusetts. She graduated from Wellesley with a Bachelor of Arts degree in 1969, Phi Beta Kappa. Graber attended Yale Law School where she earned her Juris Doctor in 1972. She attended Yale with Hillary Rodham (now Clinton) and Bill Clinton.

== Legal career ==
Upon graduation Graber became an assistant attorney general for the New Mexico Bureau of Revenue, where she continued until 1974. That year she entered private law practice in Santa Fe, New Mexico, until 1975. In 1975 she moved to Ohio where she returned to private practice, this time with Taft Stettinius & Hollister LLP in Cincinnati, until 1978. Then in 1978 Graber moved to Portland, Oregon, where she became an associate at Stoel Rives Boley Jones and Grey (now Stoel Rives LLP). In 1981 she became a partner. In 1986, the Northwest Women's Law Center gave her their Founder's Award to recognize her pro bono service. In 1983, while she was a practicing attorney, Graber was designated to serve occasionally as a state district court judge on a temporary or pro tempore basis when the regular judges of the court were unavailable. She also served as a mediator for the United States District Court for the District of Oregon from 1986 to 1988.

== Judicial career ==
=== Oregon court of appeals ===
Graber began her career as a judge when Governor Neil Goldschmidt appointed her to the Oregon Court of Appeals. She was appointed on February 11, 1988, to replace judge Thomas F. Young, who had died in office. Graber served on the court of appeals until May 2, 1990. While on the bench she served as president of the Oregon Appellate Judges Association.

=== Oregon Supreme Court ===
On May 2, 1990, Graber was appointed to the Oregon Supreme Court by Governor Goldschmidt to replace Robert E. Jones. However, Jones, prior to resigning his position, filed for re-election and won the election. Thus Jones resigned a second time and Goldschmidt appointed Graber a second time on January 7, 1991. She became the second woman to serve on that court, following Betty Roberts. Graber then won election to a full six-year term in 1992, but resigned on April 1, 1998, before the term expired. While on the court she was considered to be a candidate for appointment to the United States Supreme Court.

=== Federal judicial service ===
On July 30, 1997, President Bill Clinton nominated Graber to the United States Court of Appeals for the Ninth Circuit to replace Judge Edward Leavy, who assumed senior status. She was subsequently confirmed by the United States Senate by a 98–0 vote on March 17, 1998. She received her commission on March 19, 1998. With her appointment she became the first female judge to serve on that court from the state of Oregon.

In 1998, the Classroom Law Project named her Legal Citizen of the Year, and in 2001 she received the Oregon For Country Award from Yale University. Graber was selected to be chairperson of the American Bar Association’s Committee on Appellate Practice in 2001. She has served on two committees of the United States Judicial Conference: Committee on State-Federal Jurisdiction (2010–13) and Committee on Rules of Practice and Procedure (2013–16).

Judge Graber on February 11, 2021, announced her intention to assume senior status upon appointment of her successor. She assumed senior status on December 15, 2021, when her successor, Jennifer Sung was confirmed by the United States Senate.

=== Notable rulings ===
In 2006, Graber upheld a 159-year mandatory minimum sentence imposed on a mentally handicapped getaway driver.

On November 30, 2021, Graber wrote the majority opinion in Duncan v. Bonta, a major 2nd amendment case that dealt with a law regulating high-capacity gun magazines, specifically, the law prohibits gun magazines that hold more than 10 bullets. Graber and the 7-4 majority found that the law does not violate the 2nd amendment.

=== Notable dissents ===
In 2025, Graber dissented from a ruling allowing the administration of President Donald Trump to continue deploying National Guard forces in Portland, Oregon in response to protests against Immigration and Customs Enforcement (ICE) enforcement operations. The majority ruling paused a temporary restraining order by Judge Karin Immergut in which Immergut had blocked deployment of the National Guard in Portland, with Judge Immergut writing that Trump’s claims of daily unrest in Portland (which were used to justify the deployment) were “untethered to facts,” and that "[t]his is a nation of Constitutional law, not martial law."

Graber's dissent similarly emphasized that "no legal or factual justification supported the order to federalize and deploy the Oregon National Guard," and that the majority's decision allowing the deployment to go forward "is not merely absurd. It erodes core constitutional principles, including sovereign States' control over their States' militias and the people's First Amendment rights to assemble and to object to the government's policies and actions." Graber's dissent ended with this plea: "I urge my colleagues on this court to act swiftly to vacate the majority’s order before the illegal deployment of troops under false pretenses can occur. Above all, I ask those who are watching this case unfold to retain faith in our judicial system for just a little longer."

== See also ==
- List of Jewish American jurists
- List of first women lawyers and judges in Oregon

Legal offices
Preceded by Robert Jones	Justice of the Oregon Supreme Court; 1990–1998	Succeeded by R. William Riggs
Preceded by Edward Leavy	Judge of the United States Court of Appeals for the Ninth Circuit; 1998–2021	Succeeded by Jennifer Sung
