= Edward Leavy =

American judge (1929–2023)

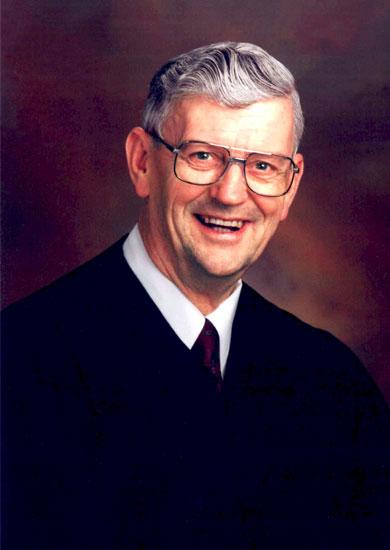

Senior Judge of the United States Court of Appeals for the Ninth Circuit
- In office May 19, 1997 – March 12, 2023

Presiding Judge of the United States Foreign Intelligence Surveillance Court of Review
- In office May 19, 2005 – May 19, 2008
- Appointed by: William Rehnquist
- Preceded by: Ralph B. Guy Jr.
- Succeeded by: Bruce M. Selya

Judge of the United States Foreign Intelligence Surveillance Court of Review
- In office September 25, 2001 – May 19, 2008
- Appointed by: William Rehnquist
- Preceded by: Paul Hitch Roney
- Succeeded by: Morris S. Arnold

Judge of the United States Court of Appeals for the Ninth Circuit
- In office March 23, 1987 – May 19, 1997
- Appointed by: Ronald Reagan
- Preceded by: Otto Richard Skopil Jr.
- Succeeded by: Susan P. Graber

Judge of the United States District Court for the District of Oregon
- In office May 3, 1984 – April 8, 1987
- Appointed by: Ronald Reagan
- Preceded by: Robert C. Belloni
- Succeeded by: Malcolm F. Marsh

Magistrate Judge of the United States District Court for the District of Oregon
- In office 1976–1984

Personal details
- Born: August 14, 1929 Butteville, Oregon, U.S.
- Died: March 12, 2023 (aged 93) Wilsonville, Oregon, U.S.
- Education: University of Portland (BA); University of Notre Dame (LLB)

Edward John Leavy (August 14, 1929 – March 12, 2023) was an American jurist who served as a judge of the United States Court of Appeals for the Ninth Circuit, the United States Foreign Intelligence Surveillance Court of Review, and the United States District Court for the District of Oregon.

== Early life, education and early legal career ==
Leavy was born on August 14, 1929, in Butteville, Oregon, along the Willamette River south of Portland. He was the son of an Irish immigrant and the youngest of 10 children. He received his Bachelor of Arts degree from the University of Portland in 1950, and earned his Bachelor of Laws from the Notre Dame Law School in 1953. Leavy entered private legal practice in Eugene in Lane County, Oregon, in 1953, where he remained until becoming a deputy district attorney for Lane County the following year. He served in that position until 1957.

=== Judicial career ===
In 1957, Leavy became a district court judge for the county, and in 1961 became an Oregon circuit court (trial level court in Oregon) judge when the district courts in Oregon were abolished. He continued as a judge in Lane County until 1976, and in 1974 spent time as a justice pro tempore on the Oregon Supreme Court. From 1976 until 1984 he was a United States Magistrate of the United States District Court for the District of Oregon headquartered in Portland.

Leavy was nominated by President Ronald Reagan on March 26, 1984, to a seat on the United States District Court for the District of Oregon vacated by Judge Robert C. Belloni. He was confirmed by the United States Senate on April 24, 1984, and received commission on May 3, 1984. His service terminated on April 8, 1987, due to elevation to the court of appeals.

Leavy was nominated by President Reagan on February 2, 1987, to a seat on the United States Court of Appeals for the Ninth Circuit vacated by Judge Otto Richard Skopil Jr. He was confirmed by the Senate on March 20, 1987, and received commission on March 23, 1987. He assumed senior status on May 19, 1997. In 2019, he was on panels regarding Donald Trump's asylum ban and Trump's rule against abortion counseling at federally funded facilities.

== Personal life and death ==
Leavy died on March 12, 2023, at the age of 93. He had been in hospice care for several months.

Legal offices
Preceded by Robert C. Belloni	Judge of the United States District Court for the District of Oregon; 1984–1987	Succeeded by Malcolm F. Marsh
Preceded by Otto Richard Skopil Jr.	Judge of the United States Court of Appeals for the Ninth Circuit; 1987–1997	Succeeded by Susan P. Graber
Preceded by Paul Hitch Roney	Judge of the United States Foreign Intelligence Surveillance Court of Review; 2001–2008	Succeeded by Morris S. Arnold
Preceded by Ralph B. Guy Jr.	Presiding Judge of the United States Foreign Intelligence Surveillance Court of Review; 2005–2008	Succeeded by Bruce M. Selya
