= Kristine Olson =

American lawyer

United States Attorney for the District of Oregon
- In office 1994–2001
- Nominated by: Bill Clinton
- Preceded by: Charles H. Turner
- Succeeded by: Michael W. Mosman

Personal details
- Born: August 9, 1947 (age 79)
- Education: Wellesley College; Yale Law School

Kristine Olson (born August 9, 1947) was the United States Attorney for the District of Oregon from her Senate confirmation in 1994 until her resignation in 2001. Olson is a contributor to The Oregon Encyclopedia.

Olson was a member of Wellesley College's Class of 1969 with Hillary Rodham (later Clinton). She graduated Yale Law School in 1972. In 1971 she married Jeffrey Rogers, son of former Attorney General and then United States Secretary of State William P. Rogers.

Political offices
Preceded by Charles H. Turner	United States Attorney for the District of Oregon; 1994–2001	Succeeded by Michael W. Mosman
