= William G. East =

American judge

Senior Judge of the United States District Court for the District of Oregon
- In office April 10, 1967 – April 27, 1985

Judge of the United States District Court for the District of Oregon
- In office June 8, 1955 – April 10, 1967
- Appointed by: Dwight D. Eisenhower
- Preceded by: James Alger Fee
- Succeeded by: Robert C. Belloni

Personal details
- Born: William G. East; April 25, 1908 Lecompton, Kansas
- Died: April 27, 1985 (aged 77)
- Education: University of Oregon School of Law (LL.B., J.D.)

William G. East (April 25, 1908 – April 27, 1985) was a United States district judge of the United States District Court for the District of Oregon.

== Education and career ==
Born on April 25, 1908, in Lecompton, Kansas, East received a Bachelor of Laws in 1931 from the University of Oregon School of Law and a Juris Doctor in 1932 from the same institution. He entered private practice in Eugene, Oregon from 1932 to 1942 and again from 1946 to 1949. He served in the United States Army Reserve as a captain from 1942 to 1946. He was city attorney for Eugene from 1946 to 1947. He was a Judge of the Oregon Circuit Court for the Second Judicial District from 1949 to 1955.

== Federal judicial service ==
East was nominated by President Dwight D. Eisenhower on May 2, 1955, to a seat on the United States District Court for the District of Oregon vacated by Judge James Alger Fee. He was confirmed by the United States Senate on June 7, 1955, and received his commission the next day. He assumed senior status due to a certified disability on April 10, 1967. His service terminated on April 27, 1985, due to his death.

=== Notable cases ===
In 1960, East issued an injunction against a local water district in a racially charged case where the African-American residents of a Parkrose, Portland, Oregon, were discriminated against by the local water district.

In 1964, East made national headlines for ordering United States Attorney General Robert F. Kennedy to show why an Oregon lawyer should not be paid for defending a criminal defendant he had been ordered to defend by the federal court. In what Time magazine said was "may be the neatest constitutional argument of the year," East justified the expenditure under the Takings Clause of the Fifth Amendment to the United States Constitution.

=== Notable clerk ===
From 1964 to 1965 future Oregon Attorney General Hardy Myers was a law clerk for East.

=== Notable appellate cases ===
After assuming senior status, East often sat as a federal appeals court judge for the Ninth Circuit on three judge panels including the case Universal City Studios, Inc. v. Sony Corp. of America, 659 F.2d 963 (C.A.9) 1981.

== See also ==
- Stump v. Sparkman

Legal offices
Preceded by James Alger Fee	Judge of the United States District Court for the District of Oregon; 1955–1967	Succeeded by Robert C. Belloni
