= James M. Burns (judge) =

American judge (1924–2001)

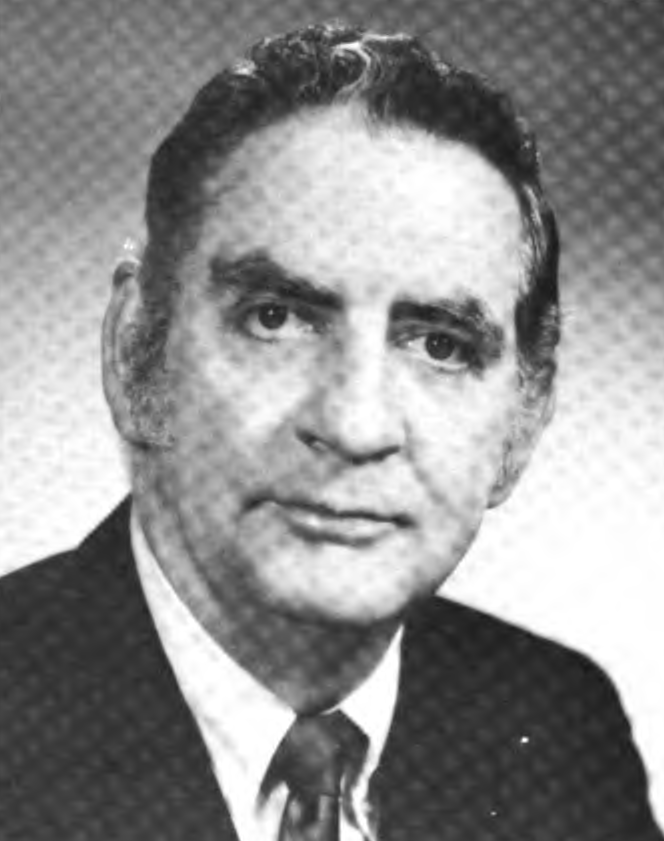
- Burns circa 1972

Senior Judge of the United States District Court for the District of Oregon
- In office November 24, 1989 – December 21, 2001

Chief Judge of the United States District Court for the District of Oregon
- In office 1979–1984
- Preceded by: Otto Richard Skopil Jr.
- Succeeded by: Owen M. Panner

Judge of the United States District Court for the District of Oregon
- In office June 2, 1972 – November 24, 1989
- Appointed by: Richard Nixon
- Preceded by: Gus J. Solomon
- Succeeded by: Robert E. Jones

Personal details
- Born: James Milton Burns; November 24, 1924 Portland, Oregon
- Died: December 21, 2001 (aged 77) Wilsonville, Oregon
- Education: University of Portland (B.A.); Loyola University Chicago School of Law (J.D.)

James Milton Burns (November 24, 1924 – December 21, 2001) was an American attorney and judge in Oregon. He served as a United States district judge of the United States District Court for the District of Oregon.

== Early life ==
Burns was born in Portland, Oregon, on November 24, 1924, and was raised by an aunt after both of his parents had died by the time he was ten years old. After high school at Grant High School he earned scholarship to attend the University of Portland, but left part way through to serve as infantry in the United States Army during World War II from 1943 to 1945. While serving in France he suffered trenchfoot. After leaving the Army he received a Bachelor of Arts degree from the University of Portland in 1947 and then a Juris Doctor from Loyola University Chicago School of Law in 1950. While at Loyola he met Helen Hogan in 1950, and the two were married in November 1950 and had five daughters, two of which became attorneys.

== Career ==
Burns was in private practice in Portland from 1950 to 1952, and again from 1956 to 1966, serving in the interim as a district attorney of Harney County, in Eastern Oregon. He was also a Special Master for the United States District Court for the District of Oregon from 1962 to 1965. He was a judge of the Oregon Circuit Court for Multnomah County from 1966 to 1972, becoming a member of the faculty of the National Judicial College in 1971.

== Federal judicial service ==
On March 22, 1972, Burns was nominated by President Richard Nixon to a seat on the United States District Court for the District of Oregon vacated by Judge Gus J. Solomon. Burns was confirmed by the United States Senate on May 25, 1972, and received his commission on June 2, 1972. He served as Chief Judge from 1979 to 1984 before he assumed senior status on November 24, 1989.

=== Notable cases ===
Notable cases Burns heard included where he tossed approval for the Mount Hood Freeway in 1974, a criminal case related to the 1982 escape of prisoners from Rocky Butte Jail, and the 1987 case over construction of the Elk Creek Dam in Southern Oregon.

== Later life and death ==
At the time he took senior status he lived along the Willamette River in Wilsonville, Oregon, in the Portland metropolitan area with his wife Helen. Burns died on December 21, 2001, in Wilsonville at the age of 77. He was buried at Portland's Mount Calvary Cemetery.

Legal offices
Preceded by Gus J. Solomon	Judge of the United States District Court for the District of Oregon; 1972–1989	Succeeded by Robert E. Jones
Preceded by Otto Richard Skopil Jr.	Chief Judge of the United States District Court for the District of Oregon; 1979–1984	Succeeded by Owen M. Panner
