= Charles H. Turner (attorney) =

American politician, U.S. Attorney for Oregon (1936–2018)

United States Attorney for the District of Oregon
- In office Circa 1982 – 1993
- President: Ronald Reagan; George H. W. Bush
- Preceded by: Sidney I. Lezak
- Succeeded by: Kristine Olson

Personal details
- Born: Charles Hamilton Turner; January 14, 1936 Chicago, Illinois, U.S.
- Died: January 8, 2018 (aged 81) Kirkland, Washington, U.S.
- Party: Republican (until 1981); Independent (after 1981)
- Education: Brown University (BA); DePaul University (LLB)

Charles Hamilton Turner (January 14, 1936 – January 8, 2018) was an American lawyer who served as the United States Attorney for the District of Oregon. Prior to his presidential appointment as U.S. Attorney, Turner worked under his predecessor, Sidney I. Lezak, for 14 years. He was appointed as Lezak's replacement by President Ronald Reagan.

As U.S. Attorney, Turner investigated sham marriages and immigration fraud organized by Rajneeshees, followers of religious figure Bhagwan Shree Rajneesh (now known as Osho) in Rajneeshpuram, Oregon. He also investigated other illegal activities such as the 1984 Rajneeshee bioterror attack in The Dalles, Oregon. In 1985, high-ranking Rajneeshees plotted to murder Turner, carrying out steps including assembling a team, purchasing weapons, and performing surveillance on his office, home and car. Seven Rajneeshees were later convicted of conspiracy to assassinate him.

== Early life and education ==
Born in Chicago, Charles Hamilton Turner was a graduate of Brown University and received a Bachelor of Laws degree from DePaul University College of Law.

== Career ==
=== Assistant U.S. Attorney ===
Turner served as an assistant to his predecessor, Sidney I. Lezak, for 14 years. He was once registered as a Republican, but by 1981 he was registered as an independent voter. In December 1981, Turner was favored by the Reagan Administration to replace Lezak, and was successfully appointed by President Ronald Reagan. By 1982, Turner was the U.S. Attorney for the District of Oregon.

=== U.S. Attorney ===
As U.S. Attorney, Turner investigated sham marriages organized by the Rajneeshees (followers of charismatic leader Bhagwan Shree Rajneesh, now known as Osho) in Rajneeshpuram, Oregon, as well as other illegal activities including wiretapping, immigration fraud, and the 1984 Rajneeshee bioterror attack in Antelope, Oregon.

In 1985, high-ranking followers of Rajneesh plotted to murder Turner. The perpetrators carried out steps including assembling a team of conspirators, creating a hit-list of individuals to assassinate including Turner and other Oregon officials, acquiring false identification, purchasing weapons out-of-state, and performing surveillance on Turner's office, home and car. Seven followers of Rajneesh were convicted of conspiracy to assassinate Turner. Turner later commented on how the assassination plot against him by followers of Rajneesh had affected him: "This was a lying-in-wait conspiracy to murder me, a presidential appointee, and for a long time I slept with a loaded gun beside my bed."

In 1988, Turner hired attorney Michael Mosman as a prosecutor related to illegal activities on tribal lands in Oregon – Mosman would go on to be confirmed by the United States Senate as U.S. attorney for Oregon in 2001. Turner commented of hiring Mosman: "He had excellent skills beyond his age and was going to be a first-class lawyer." Turner hired another attorney who would go on to become U.S. Attorney for Oregon, Mark Bailey, who had previously worked out of the U.S. Attorney's office in Houston, Texas. Turner served as a federal prosecutor for 17 years, and retired in 1993. Kristine Olson succeeded Turner as U.S. Attorney for Oregon; she had previously worked under Turner but resigned in 1984 after disagreement with Turner over her methods.

== Personal life ==
Turner was a longtime close friend of Michael Schrunk, the chief prosecutor in Multnomah County, since 1980. On January 8, 2018, he died at the age of 81, survived by his wife and two children.

== See also ==
Political offices
Preceded by Sidney I. Lezak	United States Attorney for the District of Oregon; Circa 1982 - 1993	Succeeded by Kristine Olson
