= Otto Richard Skopil Jr. =

American judge (1919–2012)

- Skopil in 2007

Senior Judge of the United States Court of Appeals for the Ninth Circuit
- In office June 30, 1986 – October 18, 2012

Judge of the United States Court of Appeals for the Ninth Circuit
- In office September 26, 1979 – June 30, 1986
- Appointed by: Jimmy Carter
- Preceded by: Seat established by 92 Stat. 1629
- Succeeded by: Edward Leavy

Chief Judge of the United States District Court for the District of Oregon
- In office 1976–1979
- Preceded by: Robert C. Belloni
- Succeeded by: James M. Burns

Judge of the United States District Court for the District of Oregon
- In office June 2, 1972 – October 20, 1979
- Appointed by: Richard Nixon
- Preceded by: Alfred Goodwin
- Succeeded by: Owen M. Panner

Personal details
- Born: Otto Richard Skopil Jr. June 3, 1919 Portland, Oregon, U.S.
- Died: October 18, 2012 (aged 93) Portland, Oregon, U.S.
- Party: Republican
- Education: Willamette University (BA, LLB)

Otto Richard Skopil Jr. (June 3, 1919 – October 18, 2012) was an American attorney and judge in the state of Oregon. The native Oregonian was a United States circuit judge of the United States Court of Appeals for the Ninth Circuit from 1979 to 1986. Previously, he was a United States district judge of the United States District Court for the District of Oregon from 1972 to 1979, and was the chief judge of that court from 1976 to 1979. Of German ancestry, he was a veteran of World War II and received both his undergraduate education and law degree from Willamette University.

== Early life ==
Skopil was born in Portland, Oregon, on June 3, 1919. His parents, Otto Richard Skopil and Freda Martha Boetticher, were working-class German immigrants who lived in the Salem, Oregon, area. Around age one, the family returned to Salem where Otto Jr. was raised. In high school at North Salem High School, Otto played basketball and earned a full-ride scholarship to Willamette University in Salem. At Willamette he served as class president his freshman year. He earned a Bachelor of Arts degree in economics in 1941. Otto then dropped out of law school after two years to enlist in the United States Navy along with two classmates. During World War II, he was a lieutenant in the Navy in that service's supply division from 1942 to 1946. He returned to university in 1945 and, in 1946, he graduated from Willamette University College of Law with a Bachelor of Laws and entered private legal practice in Salem where he remained until 1972. The university created a special class to allow him and other veterans to start mid-term and resume where they had left off before the war. While in private practice in 1967, he represented State Farm Insurance in a case that reached the United States Supreme Court.<refState Farm Fire & Cas. Co. v. Tashire, 386 U.S. 523 (1967)</ref>

== Judicial career ==
On March 22, 1972, President Richard Nixon nominated Skopil to replace Judge Alfred Goodwin on the bench of the United States District Court for the District of Oregon. He was confirmed by the United States Senate three days later and received his federal commission on June 2, 1972. He continued on that court until October 20, 1979, as chief judge from 1976 to 1979.

US Supreme Court Chief Justice Warren Burger appointed Skopil in 1979 as chairman to the National Magistrates Committee which worked to expand the powers of federal magistrate judges. Skopil was appointed due to his work at the federal district court in Oregon to expand the role of these lower level judges in the federal court system. On the committee he worked with United States Attorney General Griffin Bell, which helped Skopil earn a nomination to the United States Court of Appeals, the last court before the Supreme Court of the United States.

President Jimmy Carter nominated Skopil for a new seat created by 92 Stat. 1629 on the United States Court of Appeals for the Ninth Circuit on June 14, 1979. Skopil was confirmed on September 25, 1979, by the US Senate and received his commission the following day. He is one of only a few federal judges to be nominated by US presidents from both the Republican and Democratic political parties. Skopil became a senior judge for the court on June 30, 1986.

== Later life and family ==
From 1968 until 1974, he was on the board of trustees for Willamette and, in 1983, received an honorary doctorate there. After assuming senior status on the court, Skopil continued to work on the bench. In 1990, he was appointed to the Long Range Planning Committee of the federal court system by Chief Justice William Rehnquist.

Both his son, Otto III, and his daughter, Shannon Skopil, were attorneys. Otto and his wife Jan also had children named Casey and Molly Skopil. At the beginning of his time in private practice he partnered with his attorney uncle Ralph Skopil. Otto had a younger brother named Robert.

Skopil died on October 18, 2012, at the age of 93 at home in Portland.

Legal offices
Preceded by Alfred Goodwin	Judge of the United States District Court for the District of Oregon; 1972–1979	Succeeded by Owen M. Panner
Preceded by Robert C. Belloni	Chief Judge of the United States District Court for the District of Oregon; 1976–1979	Succeeded by James M. Burns
Preceded by Seat established by 92 Stat. 1629	Judge of the United States Court of Appeals for the Ninth Circuit; 1979–1986	Succeeded by Edward Leavy
