= Anna J. Brown =

American judge (born 1952)

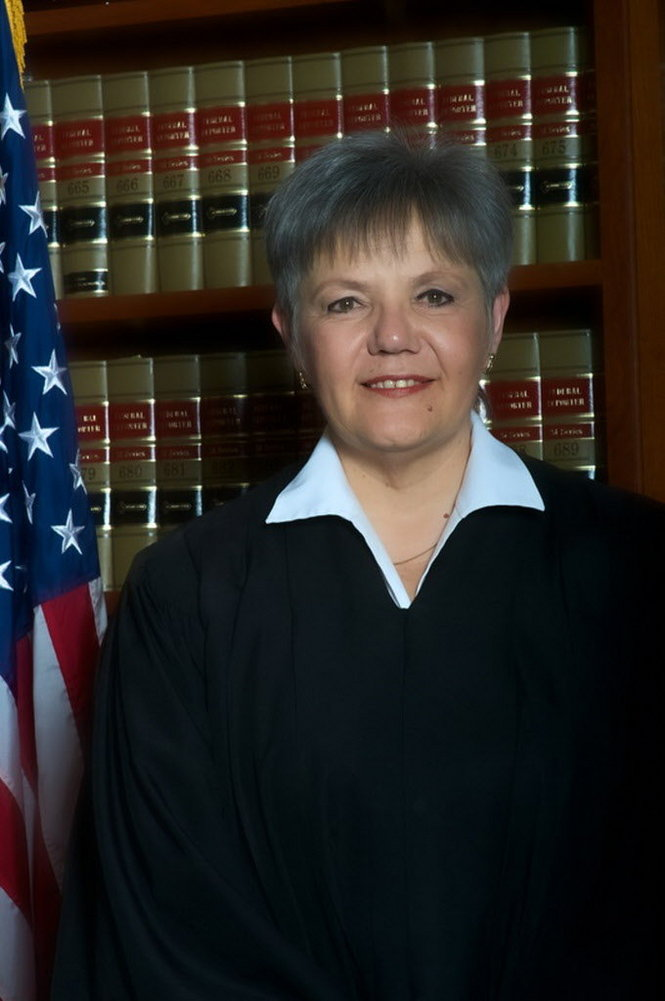

Senior Judge of the United States District Court for the District of Oregon
- Incumbent
- Assumed office July 27, 2017

Judge of the United States District Court for the District of Oregon
- In office October 26, 1999 – July 27, 2017
- Appointed by: Bill Clinton
- Preceded by: Malcolm F. Marsh
- Succeeded by: Karin Immergut

Judge for the Multnomah County Circuit Court
- In office 1994–1999

Personal details
- Born: Anna Jaeger; 1952 (age 73–74) Portland, Oregon
- Education: Portland State University (BS); Lewis & Clark Law School (JD)

Anna Jaeger Brown (born 1952) is a senior United States district judge of the United States District Court for the District of Oregon.

== Early life ==
Brown was born in Portland, Oregon, in 1952, and attended high school there at St. Mary's Academy where she graduated in 1970. She received a Bachelor of Science degree from Portland State University in 1975. Brown continued her education at Northwestern School of Law (now Lewis and Clark Law School) where she received a Juris Doctor in 1980. While in law school she worked as a law clerk for Judge John C. Beatty of the Multnomah County Circuit Court in Portland from 1978 to 1980. Following law school in 1980, Brown entered private legal practice in Portland where she remained until 1992.

== Judicial career ==
=== State judicial service ===
In 1992, Brown became a judge on the Multnomah County District Court. She served on that court until 1994 when she was elevated to the Multnomah County Circuit Court.

=== Federal judicial service ===
On April 22, 1999, Brown was nominated to the United States District Court for the District of Oregon by President Bill Clinton. She had been nominated to the seat vacated by Malcolm F. Marsh who took senior status on April 16, 1998. She was confirmed on October 15, 1999 by the United States Senate and received her commission on October 26. She took the oath of office and entered on duty on October 27. She took senior status on July 27, 2017.

Legal offices
Preceded by Malcolm F. Marsh	Judge of the United States District Court for the District of Oregon; 1999–2017	Succeeded by Karin Immergut
