= Jennifer Sung =

American judge (born 1972)

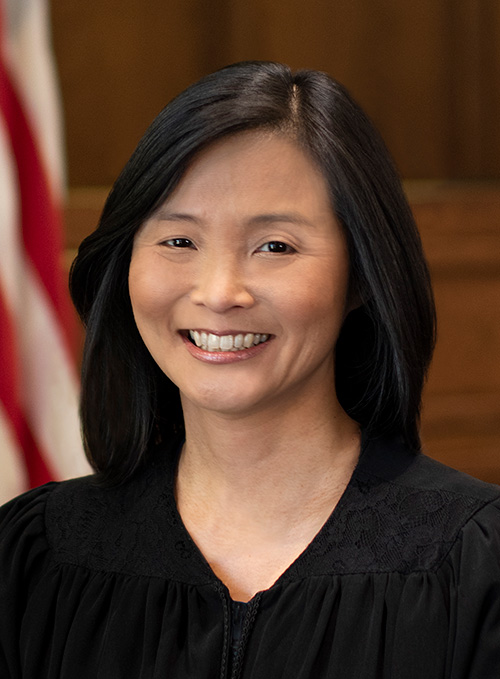

Judge of the United States Court of Appeals for the Ninth Circuit
- Incumbent
- Assumed office December 20, 2021
- Appointed by: Joe Biden
- Preceded by: Susan P. Graber

Personal details
- Born: 1972 (age 53–54) Edison, New Jersey, U.S.
- Education: Oberlin College (BA); Yale University (JD)

Jennifer Sung (born 1972) is a United States circuit judge of the United States Court of Appeals for the Ninth Circuit.

== Early life and education ==
Sung was born in 1972 in Edison, New Jersey, to a Chinese-American family. She graduated from Oberlin College in 1994 with a Bachelor of Arts in politics with honors. From 1994 to 2001, Sung worked as a union organizer for the Service Employees International Union. She then attended Yale Law School, graduating in 2004 with a Juris Doctor.

== Career ==
After law school, Sung served as a law clerk to Ninth Circuit judge Betty Binns Fletcher from 2004 to 2005. From 2005 to 2007, she was a Skadden Fellow at the Brennan Center for Justice at the New York University School of Law. From 2007 to 2013, she worked at Altshuler Berzon LLP in San Francisco. From 2013 to 2017, she was a partner at McKanna Bishop Joffe in Portland, Oregon. From July 1, 2017 to December 20, 2021, she was a member of the Oregon Employment Relations Board.

=== Federal judicial service ===
On June 30, 2021, President Joe Biden announced his intent to nominate Sung to serve as a United States circuit judge for the United States Court of Appeals for the Ninth Circuit. On July 13, 2021, her nomination was sent to the Senate. President Biden nominated Sung to the seat to be vacated by Judge Susan P. Graber, who announced her intent to assume senior status upon confirmation of a successor. On September 14, 2021, a hearing on her nomination was held before the Senate Judiciary Committee. During the hearing, senators questioned her about her decision to sign a letter regarding Brett Kavanaugh's nomination to the United States Supreme Court. The letter accused Kavanaugh of being an "intellectually and morally bankrupt ideologue" and claimed that "people will die if he is confirmed". Sung said she recognized that much of the letter's rhetoric "was overheated," but she did not disavow the letter or say "whether she thought Kavanaugh was indeed 'intellectually and morally bankrupt.'" On October 21, 2021, the Senate Judiciary Committee failed to report her nomination by a 10–10 vote. On November 3, 2021, the United States Senate discharged the committee from further consideration of her nomination by a 49–49 vote, with Vice President Kamala Harris breaking the tie. On December 7, 2021, Majority Leader Chuck Schumer filed cloture on her nomination. On December 9, 2021, the Senate invoked cloture on her nomination by a 48–39 vote. On December 15, 2021, her nomination was confirmed by a 50–49 vote. She received her judicial commission on December 20, 2021. Sung is Oregon's first Asian Pacific American to serve on the Ninth Circuit.

=== Notable rulings ===
On September 26, 2022, Sung dissented on an en banc panel in a 8–3 decision that held that California AB 32, a law that banned private, for-profit prison and immigration detention centers within the state, was unconstitutional.

Sung joined a unanimous decision of a three-judge panel, ruling that the Trump administration could deploy the National Guard to curb riots in Los Angeles, in spite of the objections of California Governor Gavin Newsom.

On August 1, 2025, Sung ruled that ICE cannot detain people based on their race, language, accent, occupation, or location.

== See also ==
- Joe Biden judicial appointment controversies
- List of Asian American jurists

Legal offices
Preceded by Susan P. Graber	Judge of the United States Court of Appeals for the Ninth Circuit; 2021–present	Incumbent
