= Portland ICE facility =

Building in Portland, Oregon, U.S.

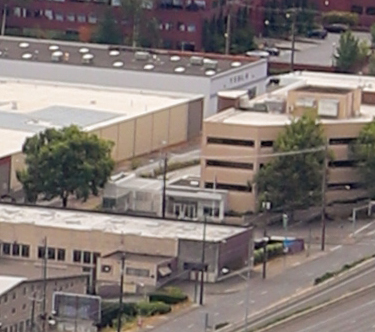
- The Immigration and Customs Enforcement facility in South Waterfront
- Interactive map of the Portland ICE facility area

General information
- Location: Portland, Oregon, United States
- Coordinates: 45°29′33″N 122°40′21″W

The Portland ICE facility is the common name of a building used by United States Immigration and Customs Enforcement in Portland, Oregon. It is also known as the Lindquist Building.

== History ==
The General Services Administration has leased space in the building since 2011. The site was the focal point of a week-long demonstration in 2018, and remains a focal point for ongoing 2025–2026 protests following changes to immigration enforcement practices during Donald Trump's second presidency. In 2025, protesters began holding daily protests at the building; most of these were focused around performance art and peaceful gatherings, though some resulted in clashes with federal agents.

The building closed for 22 days during the summer of 2025. Homeland Security Secretary Kristi Noem visited the facility in October 2025.

The city has threatened to evict ICE from the building over permit violations.

== See also ==
- 2020 deployment of federal forces in the United States § Activities in Portland, Oregon
- List of ICE field offices
