= Owen M. Panner =

American attorney and jurist (1924–2018)

Senior Judge of the United States District Court for the District of Oregon
- In office July 28, 1992 – December 19, 2018

Chief Judge of the United States District Court for the District of Oregon
- In office 1984–1990
- Preceded by: James M. Burns
- Succeeded by: James A. Redden

Judge of the United States District Court for the District of Oregon
- In office February 20, 1980 – July 28, 1992
- Appointed by: Jimmy Carter
- Preceded by: Otto Richard Skopil Jr.
- Succeeded by: Ancer L. Haggerty

Personal details
- Born: Owen Murphy Panner; July 28, 1924 Chicago, Illinois
- Died: December 19, 2018 (aged 94) Medford, Oregon
- Education: University of Oklahoma College of Law (LLB)

Owen Murphy Panner (July 28, 1924 – December 19, 2018) was an American attorney and jurist from Oregon who served as a United States district judge of the United States District Court for the District of Oregon.

== Early life ==
Panner was born in Chicago, Illinois to a geologist father. The family, which included two sisters, moved to Oklahoma, where Panner grew up in the town of Whizbang. His father worked in the oil fields as Owen grew up in the Great Depression and Dust Bowl. In his youth he was an amateur golfer and won several titles. After high school, he enrolled at the University of Oklahoma, but left after two years in 1943 to join the United States Army and the war effort, serving from 1943 to 1946.

In the Army he received an engineering education at West Virginia University before more schooling in transportation. Panner was then stationed in Los Angeles, California, where he worked on the docks coordinating shipments and where he met his first wife Agnes. They married and had their first child in 1946. The family was transferred to New York City, where Panner coordinated shipments to Europe after the end of World War II. After his discharge he entered the University of Oklahoma College of Law, where he graduated in 1949 with a Bachelor of Laws.

== Legal career ==
Panner moved to Central Oregon in 1949. In 1950 he entered private legal practice in Bend, Oregon, where he remained until 1980. From 1971 to 1974 he was on the Judicial Reform Commission of Oregon. While in Bend he worked for a variety of clients, including as general counsel for the Confederated Tribes of Warm Springs. Due to his work for the tribe, he was offered, but declined, the position of Commissioner of the Bureau of Indian Affairs under President John F. Kennedy. A trial lawyer, he became a fellow of the American College of Trial Lawyers and was named trial attorney of the year in 1973 for Oregon by the American Board of Trial Advocates. Panner was also vice president of the Oregon State Bar and a member of the board of governors of the organization from 1961 to 1963, as well as president of the Central Oregon chapter.

== Federal judicial service ==
On December 3, 1979, President Jimmy Carter nominated Panner for a seat on the United States District Court for the District of Oregon after Judge Otto Richard Skopil Jr. was elevated to the United States Court of Appeals for the Ninth Circuit. Panner was confirmed by the United States Senate on February 20, 1980, and received his commission the same day. He served as Chief Judge for the court from 1984 to 1990, and took senior status on July 28, 1992. In 1987, he was named Lewis & Clark Law School’s distinguished honorary alumni.

== Later years ==
After assuming senior status, Panner continued to work for the court on a reduced schedule. Nevertheless, he presided over several significant cases of precedential importance. For example, in 2009 Panner ruled that members of Santo Daime church can import, distribute and brew ayahuasca and issued a permanent injunction barring the government from prohibiting or penalizing the sacramental use of "Daime tea". Panner's order said activities of The Church of the Holy Light of the Queen are legal and protected under freedom of religion. His order prohibits the federal government from interfering with and prosecuting church members who follow a list of regulations set out in his order. His decision was based on a unanimous 2006 US Supreme Court ruling in Gonzales v. O Centro Espírita Beneficente União do Vegetal, that required the U.S. federal government to allow the Church to import and consume the tea for religious ceremonies under the 1993 Religious Freedom Restoration Act.

The Oregon State Bar's litigation section presents an annual award for professionalism in honor of Panner. He had four children and later remarried to Nancy. Panner was a trustee of Lewis & Clark College, a former president of the Bend Chamber of Commerce, and a past president of the Oregon Historical Society. He died on December 19, 2018, in Medford, where he had resided in his later years.

Legal offices
Preceded by Otto Richard Skopil Jr.	Judge of the United States District Court for the District of Oregon; 1980–1992	Succeeded by Ancer L. Haggerty
Preceded by James M. Burns	Chief Judge of the United States District Court for the District of Oregon; 1984–1990	Succeeded by James A. Redden
