= Robert C. Belloni =

American judge

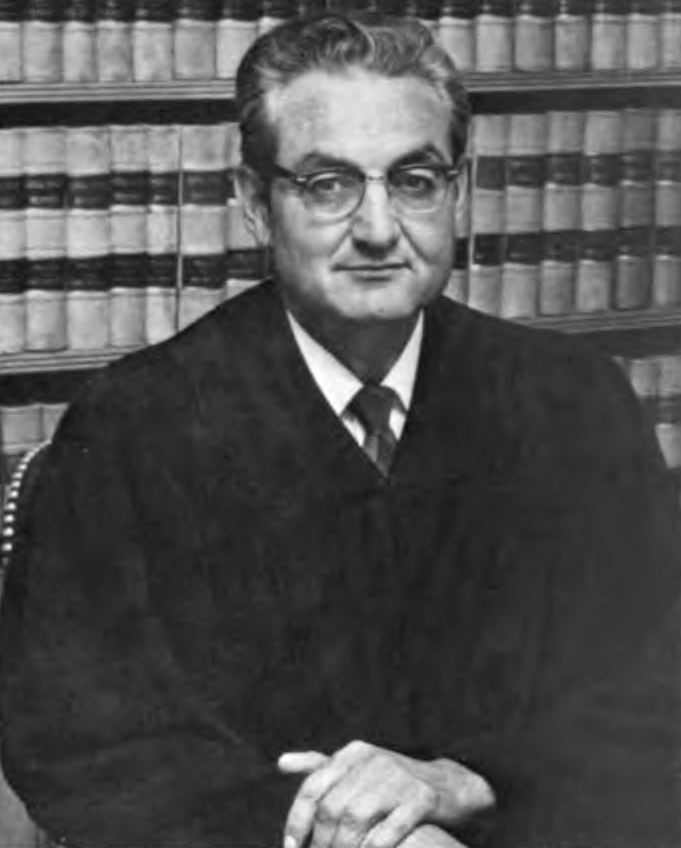

Senior Judge of the United States District Court for the District of Oregon
- In office April 4, 1984 – November 3, 1999

Chief Judge of the United States District Court for the District of Oregon
- In office 1971–1976
- Preceded by: Gus J. Solomon
- Succeeded by: Otto Richard Skopil Jr.

Judge of the United States District Court for the District of Oregon
- In office April 4, 1967 – April 4, 1984
- Appointed by: Lyndon B. Johnson
- Preceded by: William G. East
- Succeeded by: Edward Leavy

Personal details
- Born: Robert Clinton Belloni; April 4, 1919 Riverton, Oregon
- Died: November 3, 1999 (aged 80) San Mateo, California
- Education: University of Oregon (B.A.); University of Oregon School of Law (J.D.)

Robert Clinton Belloni (April 4, 1919 – November 3, 1999) was a United States district judge of the United States District Court for the District of Oregon. He was instrumental in upholding Native American fishing rights in the Pacific Northwest.

== Education and career ==
Belloni was from Myrtle Point, Oregon; he was born in Riverton, Oregon. He received a Bachelor of Arts degree from the University of Oregon in 1941 and a Juris Doctor from the University of Oregon School of Law in 1951. He was a lieutenant in the United States Army from 1942 to 1946. He entered private practice in Coquille, Oregon from 1951 to 1952, then practiced in Myrtle Point from 1952 to 1957. He was a City Councilman for Myrtle Point from 1953 to 1957, and was the Mayor of Myrtle Point in 1957. He served as a Judge of the Oregon Circuit Court for Coos County and Curry County from 1957 to 1967.

== Federal judicial career ==
Belloni was nominated by President Lyndon B. Johnson on February 21, 1967, to a seat on the United States District Court for the District of Oregon vacated by Judge William G. East. He was confirmed by the United States Senate on April 4, 1967, and received his commission on April 4, 1967. He served as Chief Judge from 1971 to 1976. He assumed senior status on April 4, 1984. He took inactive senior status in 1995 and died on November 3, 1999, of congestive heart failure in a retirement home in San Mateo, California.

== See also ==
- Sohappy v. Smith

Legal offices
Preceded by William G. East	Judge of the United States District Court for the District of Oregon; 1967–1984	Succeeded by Edward Leavy
Preceded by Gus J. Solomon	Chief Judge of the United States District Court for the District of Oregon; 1971–1976	Succeeded by Otto Richard Skopil Jr.
