= Muriel Lezak =

American neuropsychologist (1927–2021)

Muriel Elaine Deutsch Lezak
- Born: August 26, 1927
- Died: October 6, 2021
- Occupation: neuropsychologist

Muriel Elaine Deutsch Lezak (August 26, 1927 – October 6, 2021) was an American neuropsychologist best known for her book Neuropsychological Assessment, widely accepted as the standard in the field. Her work has centred on the research, assessment, and rehabilitation of brain injury. Lezak was a professor of neurology at the Oregon Health and Science University School of Medicine.

She favored the flexible approach to administering neuropsychological batteries.

== Biography ==
Lezak was born in Chicago, Illinois in 1927. She held bachelor's and master's degrees from the University of Chicago, and earned a Ph.D. in Clinical Psychology from the University of Portland in 1960. She worked in clinics and taught psychology until 1966.

In the 1940s, Lezak began work as a clinical psychologist. She became interested in the connection between the brain and an individual's behavior after treating World War I, World War II and the Vietnam War veterans. Through her work, she realized there wasn't a comprehensive book on major disorders caused by brain dysfunction and injury, or the techniques, tests and procedures to evaluate patients. Published first in 1976, her book Neuropsychological Assessment was the first comprehensive text on the subject and touted a flexible approach to treating patients. She modified the Rey Auditory Verbal Learning Test by adding a 45-word list recognition trial. This version is the most widely used by clinicians .

In 1982, she was the first to express concern for athletes with head injuries, later warning of second-impact syndrome in 1999.

In 1996, she received the Distinguished Neuropsychologist Award from the US-based National Academy of Neuropsychology. Past recipients include the prominent neuropsychologists George Prigatano, Brenda Milner, Ralph Reitan and Arthur Benton.

Lezak has three children: Anne, David, and Miriam. Her husband Sid, who died in 2006, was a United States Attorney in Oregon for more than twenty years. She died on October 6, 2021, in Portland, at the age of 94.

== Selected publications ==
- Bowler, R. M., Lezak, M., Booty, A., Hartney, C., Mergler, D., Levin, J. & Zisman, F. (2001). Neuropsychological dysfunction, mood disturbance, and emotional status of munitions workers. Applied Neuropsychology, 8(2), 74-90.
- Cohen, R. Green, M.D. Lezak, J. Lyberger, J. Mack, E. Silbergeld, J. Valciukas, and W. Chappell 1994 Criteria for progressive modification of neurobehavioral batteries. Neurotoxicol. Teratol. 16(5):511-524. WHO (World Health Organization) 1985 Energy and protein requirements. Report of a joint FAO/WHO/UNU Expert Committee. WHO Technical Report Series 724. Geneva, Switzerland: World Health Organization.
- Lezak, MD (1978). Living with the characterologically altered brain injured patient. The Journal of Clinical Psychiatry, 39, 592-598.
- Howieson DB, Lezak MD (1992). The neuropsychological evaluation, in The American Psychiatric Press Textbook of Neuropsychiatry, 2nd Edition, edited by Yudofsky SC, Hales RE. Washington, DC: American Psychiatric Press. pp. 127–150
- Lezak, MD (1979) Recovery of memory and learning. functions following brain injury. Cortex 15, 63-72.
- Lezak, MD (1982). The problem of assessing executive functions. International Journal of Psychology, 17, 281–297.
- Lezak, MD (1986). Psychological implications of traumatic brain damage for the patient’s family. Rehabilitation Psychology, 31, 241-250.
- Lezak, MD (1987). Assessment for rehabilitation purposes. In: M. Meier, A.L. Benton, & L. Diller (Eds.) Neuropsychological Rehabilitation. New York: Oxford University Press.
- Lezak, MD (1988). Brain damage is a family affair. Journal of Clinical and Experimental Neuropsychology, 10, 111-123.
- Lezak, MD (1994). Domains of behavior from a neuropsychological perspective: the whole story. Nebraska Symposium on Motivation, 41, 23–55.
- Lezak, MD (2000). Nature, applications and limitations of neuropsychological assessment following traumatic brain injury. In International Handbook of Neuropsychological Rehabilitation. A Christensen and BP Uzzell (eds). New York: Kluwer Academic/Plenum. 67-80.
- Lezak, M.D., Howieson, D.B., Bigler, E.D. & Tranel, D. (2012). Neuropsychological Assessment (5th ed.). New York: Oxford University Press.
- Matser JT, Kessels AGH, Lezak MD, et al. (1999). Neuropsychological Impairment in Amateur Soccer Players, JAMA, 282:971-3.
- Matser JT, Kessels AGH, Lezak MD and Troost J. (2001).“A Dose-Response Relation of Headers and Concussions with Cognitive Impairment in Professional Soccer Players,” J Clin Exp Neuropsychology, 23(6):770-4
- Malec J.F., Moessner AM, Kragness M, Lezak MD. (2000) Refining a measure of brain injury sequelae to predict post-acute rehabilitation outcome: rating scale analysis of the Mayo-Portland Adaptability Inventory. Journal of Head Trauma Rehabilitation 13:670-682.
