= Portland Frog =

American activist

Seth "Toad" Todd
- Other names: The Portland Frog
- Occupation: Activist
- Known for: Wearing an inflatable frog costume during protests
- Movement: Abolish ICE (anti-ICE)

Seth "Toad" Todd, better known as the Portland Frog, is an activist based in the Portland metropolitan area, United States. They are known for wearing an inflatable costume of a frog during anti-ICE protests.

== Personal life ==
Todd is non-binary and lives in Clackamas.

== See also ==
- Tía Pikachu
