= Sidney I. Lezak =

American lawyer (1924–2006)

Sidney Lezak

United States Attorney for the District of Oregon
- In office 1961–1982
- President: John F. Kennedy; Lyndon B. Johnson; Richard Nixon; Gerald Ford; Jimmy Carter; Ronald Reagan
- Succeeded by: Charles H. Turner

Personal details
- Born: November 8, 1924 Chicago, Illinois, U.S.
- Died: April 24, 2006 (aged 81) Portland, Oregon, U.S.
- Education: University of Chicago (BA, JD)

Military service
- Branch/service: United States Army
- Battles/wars: World War II

Sidney I. Lezak (November 8, 1924 – April 24, 2006) was an American lawyer who served as the United States Attorney for the District of Oregon from 1961 to 1982. Appointed acting U.S. Attorney by John F. Kennedy in 1961, Lezak resigned in 1982.

== Early life and education ==
Lezak was born in Chicago, the son of immigrants from the Russian Empire. During World War II, Lezak served as a member of the United States Army Air Forces, retiring with the rank of lieutenant colonel. After the war, Lezak earned a Bachelor of Arts degree in philosophy and a J.D. degree from the University of Chicago.

== Career ==
Lezak moved to Portland, Oregon, in 1961, where he worked as an attorney and partner in the firm of Bailey, Lezak, Swink & Gates. In 1961, Lezak was nominated to serve as United States Attorney for the District of Oregon by then-president John F. Kennedy. Lezak's nomination was blocked by newly elected senator Maurine Neuberger. From 1961 to 1964, Lezak served as acting United States Attorney until his nomination was again submitted by Lyndon B. Johnson and he was confirmed by the United States Senate. Lezak served until his retirement in 1982. After leaving government, Lezak re-established a private legal practice, specializing on dispute resolution.

== Personal life ==
Lezak died on April 24, 2006, in Portland, Oregon, at the age of 81. His daughter Anne is the mother of journalist Adrian Chen.
