= Michael W. Mosman =

American judge (born 1956)

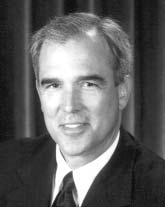

Senior Judge of the United States District Court for the District of Oregon
- Incumbent
- Assumed office December 27, 2021

Chief Judge of the United States District Court for the District of Oregon
- In office February 1, 2016 – December 23, 2019
- Preceded by: Ann Aiken
- Succeeded by: Marco A. Hernandez

Judge of the United States Foreign Intelligence Surveillance Court
- In office May 4, 2013 – May 3, 2020
- Appointed by: John Roberts
- Preceded by: Roger Vinson
- Succeeded by: Liam O'Grady

Judge of the United States District Court for the District of Oregon
- In office September 26, 2003 – December 27, 2021
- Appointed by: George W. Bush
- Preceded by: Robert E. Jones
- Succeeded by: Adrienne Nelson

United States Attorney for the District of Oregon
- In office 2001–2003
- President: George W. Bush
- Preceded by: Kristine Olson
- Succeeded by: Karin Immergut

Personal details
- Born: Michael Wise Mosman; 1956 (age 69–70) Eugene, Oregon, U.S.
- Education: Ricks College (AB); Utah State University (BS); Brigham Young University (JD)

Michael Wise Mosman (born 1956) is a senior United States district judge of the United States District Court for the District of Oregon. He served as Chief Judge for the U.S. District Court for the District of Oregon from February 1, 2016, to December 23, 2019. He also served a 7-year term on the FISA Court from May 4, 2013, to May 3, 2020. He previously served as the United States attorney for the same district.

== Early life and education ==
Michael Mosman was born in the Willamette Valley of Oregon in 1956 in the city of Eugene. He grew up in Lewiston, Idaho, the son of an attorney and judge with an older sister and three younger brothers. He attended Ricks College in Idaho, which is now Brigham Young University–Idaho. He graduated with an Artium Baccalaureus degree in 1979 before attending Utah State University in Logan, Utah. At Utah State he graduated with a Bachelor of Science degree in 1981, and was the valedictorian of his class. Mosman then went on to law school at Brigham Young University's J. Reuben Clark Law School. He graduated there in 1984 with a Juris Doctor. At BYU he was the editor of the law review, and graduated magna cum laude.

== Career ==
In 1984, Mosman clerked for Malcolm Richard Wilkey, judge on the United States Court of Appeals for the District of Columbia Circuit. The following year he entered private legal practice for part of 1985 as an associate at Shaw, Pittman, Potts & Trowbridge (now Pillsbury Winthrop Shaw Pittman). Mosman then was a clerk for Justice Lewis F. Powell of the Supreme Court of the United States. While clerking for Powell, he was involved in the justice's voting to uphold Georgia's sodomy law in Bowers v. Hardwick, writing, in a memorandum to the Justice:

"The right to privacy calls for the greatest judicial restraint, invalidating only those laws that impinge on those values that are basic to our country"

and

"I do not think that this case involves any such values. I recommend reversal [of the Eleventh Circuit decision] ... Personal sexual freedom is a newcomer among our national values, and may well be, as discussed earlier, a temporary national mood that fades."

After leaving Powell's employ, Mosman entered private practice in Portland, Oregon, in 1986 at Miller Nash (now Miller Nash Graham & Dunn).

=== United States attorney ===
In 1988, he began working as an assistant United States attorney for the District of Oregon, remaining until 2001. That year he became the United States attorney for the District of Oregon, serving until 2003. He replaced Kristine Olson Rogers who had resigned.

=== Federal judicial service ===
On May 8, 2003, President George W. Bush nominated Mosman to serve as United States district judge of the United States District Court for the District of Oregon to the seat vacated by Robert E. Jones, who assumed senior status on May 1, 2000. Senators Ron Wyden and Gordon H. Smith spoke at the confirmation hearing, highlighting his prior service in the war on terrorism and that a bipartisan commission established to fill the vacancy left by Robert E. Jones had discovered him. On September 25, 2003, he was confirmed by the United States Senate by a 93–0 vote. He received his commission on September 26, 2003. He served as Chief Judge for approximately 4 years from February 1, 2016, to December 23, 2019. He assumed senior status on December 27, 2021.

==== Foreign Intelligence Surveillance Court & Alien Terrorist Removal Court ====
He served a full 7-year term as a Judge of the United States Foreign Intelligence Surveillance Court from May 2013 to May 2020. He served as a judge of the Alien Terrorist Removal Court from 2018 to 2023.

=== Notable cases ===
==== Lemons v. Bradbury ====
On February 1, 2008, in Lemons v. Bradbury, Mosman dismissed the lawsuit and lifted an injunction against Oregon's new civil union law. Mosman had issued the temporary injunction in December 2007 to prevent Oregon's new civil union law from taking effect in January. This was in response to a legal challenge by a group that had attempted to place a referendum on the November 2008 ballot to block the civil union law that had been passed by the Oregon Legislative Assembly. The legal issue centered on how the Oregon Secretary of State verified signatures on petitions.

==== Carter Page Warrant ====
In 2017, Mosman approved renewal of a FISA Court warrant for Carter Page, a former adviser to the 2016 Trump Campaign. In July 2018, the warrant application was released publicly, marking the first time FISA warrant application materials were made public. The heavily redacted, 412-page application cites many sources, including confidential informants. Among those many sources, the application cites the Steele dossier, leading a legal commentator to criticize the basis of the warrant.

==== Kawhi Leonard v. Nike Inc ====
In April, 2020, Mosman granted Nike's motion dismissing Kawhi Leonard's copyright claims over a disputed logo, writing

"It's not merely a derivative work of the sketch itself...I do find it to be new and significantly different from the design."

==== Oregon restraining order against Department of Homeland Security (2020) ====
In July 2020, the Oregon Attorney General, Ellen Rosenblum, requested a restraining order based on the detainment actions of Department of Homeland Security and Customs and Border Protection personnel. The AG alleged that unmarked federal agents had unlawfully detained protesters in Portland without probable cause.

Mosman rejected the request for a restraining order, stating that "because it has not shown it is vindicating an interest that is specific to the state itself — I find the State of Oregon lacks standing here and therefore deny its request for a temporary restraining order".

==== Miss America ====
In 2021, Mosman dismissed a lawsuit challenging the Miss United States of America pageant's rules that dictate that their contestants be “natural females.”

== Recognition ==
- In 2018, Mosman received the Alumni Achievement Award from BYU's J. Reuben Clark Law School, entitled "How Not To Be stupid"
- As part of the Spirit and the Law Series at BYU, Mosman gave a talk on conflict and confrontation in the law

== Personal life ==
Mosman is married to the former Suzanne Cannon Hogan, and they have five children. He is a member of the Church of Jesus Christ of Latter-day Saints.

== See also ==
- List of law clerks for the first seat of the Supreme Court of the United States

Legal offices
| Preceded by Kristine Olson | United States Attorney for the District of Oregon; 2001–2003 | Succeeded by Karin Immergut |
| Preceded by Robert E. Jones | Judge of the United States District Court for the District of Oregon; 2003–2021 | Succeeded by Adrienne Nelson |
| Preceded by Ann Aiken | Chief Judge of the United States District Court for the District of Oregon; 2016–2019 | Succeeded by Marco A. Hernandez |
| Preceded by Roger Vinson | Judge of the United States Foreign Intelligence Surveillance Court; 2013–2020 | Succeeded by Liam O'Grady |
