= Karin Immergut =

American judge (born 1960)

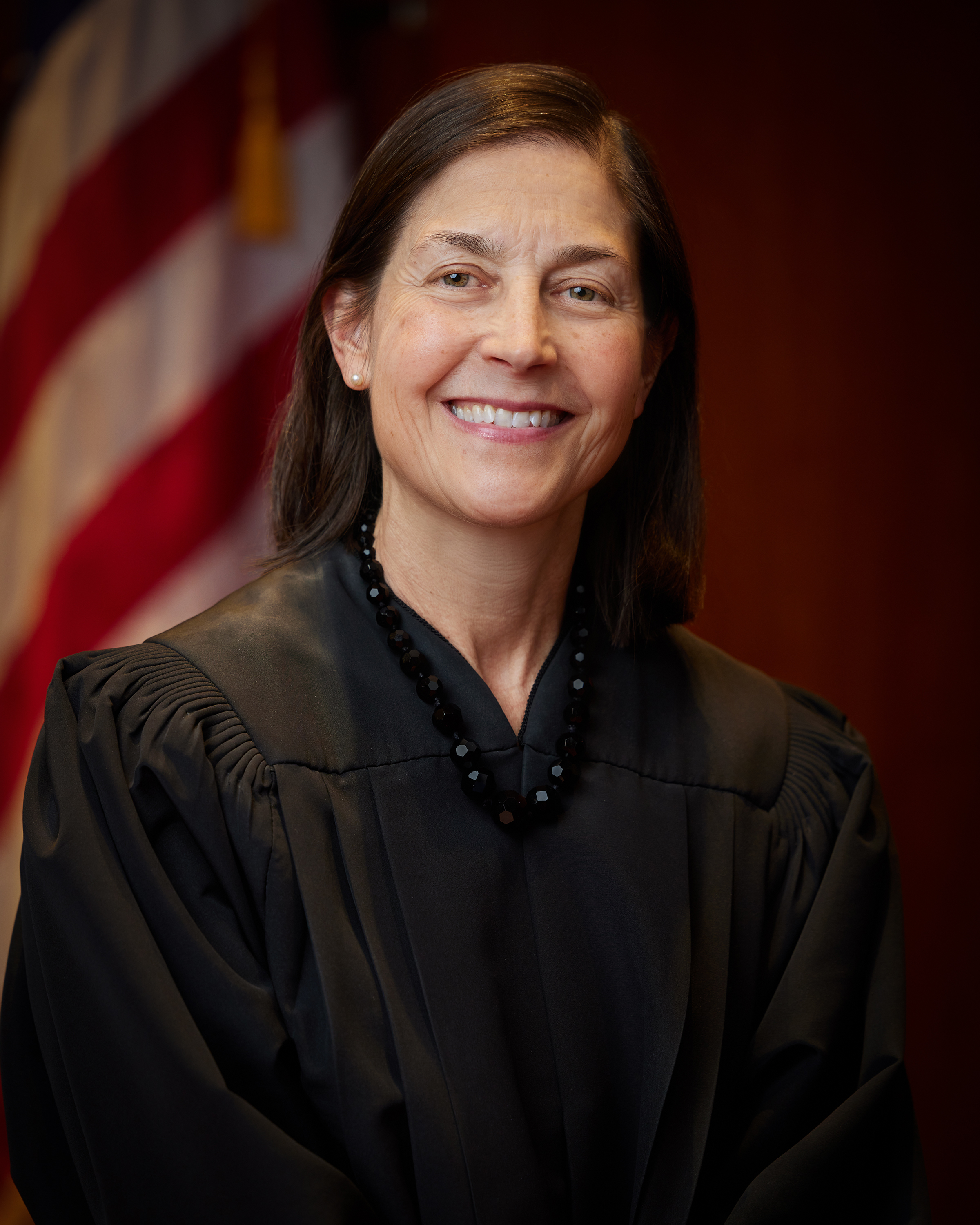

Judge of the United States Foreign Intelligence Surveillance Court
- Incumbent
- Assumed office May 19, 2024
- Appointed by: John Roberts
- Preceded by: Robert B. Kugler

Judge of the United States District Court for the District of Oregon
- Incumbent
- Assumed office August 5, 2019
- Appointed by: Donald Trump
- Preceded by: Anna J. Brown

Judge of the Multnomah County Circuit Court
- In office July 2009 – August 5, 2019
- Appointed by: Ted Kulongoski
- Preceded by: Dale Koch
- Succeeded by: Steffan Alexander

United States Attorney for the District of Oregon
- In office October 3, 2003 – July 2009
- President: George W. Bush; Barack Obama
- Preceded by: Michael W. Mosman
- Succeeded by: Dwight Holton

Personal details
- Born: 1960 (age 65–66) New York City, U.S.
- Party: Democratic (before 1998); Independent (1998–2001); Republican (2001–2022) Unaffiliated (2024–present)
- Spouse: James McDermott
- Education: Amherst College (BA); University of California, Berkeley (JD)

Karin Johanna Immergut (born 1960) is an American lawyer who has served as a United States district judge of the United States District Court for the District of Oregon since 2019. She has concurrently served as a judge of the United States Foreign Intelligence Surveillance Court since 2024.

== Early life ==
Immergut was born in Brooklyn, New York City, in 1960. Her father was an Austrian chemist and her mother a Swedish mathematician. Her parents married in Sweden and then immigrated to the United States, where Karin was born.

Immergut graduated from Amherst College in 1982 with her Bachelor of Arts degree; upon graduation, she worked as a special assistant at the New York City Departments of Juvenile Justice and Corrections.

Immergut then attended the UC Berkeley School of Law, graduating with her Juris Doctor in 1987. While a student, she was managing editor of the Boalt Hall Journal of Industrial Relations (now Berkeley Journal of Employment & Labor Law).

== Career ==
After law school she worked as a litigation associate at the law firm of Covington & Burling in Washington, D.C., for one year.

Following private practice, Immergut served as an assistant United States attorney for the Central District of California in Los Angeles for six years. During her tenure in the Central District of California, she prosecuted several large-scale complex narcotics trafficking and money laundering cases and served as a deputy chief of the Narcotics Section and chief of the Training Section. She then moved to Burlington, Vermont, to work for the firm Gravel & Shea for two years.

Immergut served for five years as a deputy district attorney in Portland, Oregon, where she primarily prosecuted white collar crimes. In 1998, while serving as a deputy district attorney, she went to work for independent counsel Kenneth Starr, who was investigating then-President Bill Clinton. Immergut personally questioned Monica Lewinsky in an August 6, 1998, deposition. In 2001, she joined the U.S. attorney's office in Portland as an assistant U.S. attorney in the District of Oregon. Serving two years in the position, she prosecuted cases involving white collar crime and worked on Project Safe Neighborhoods, a national gun violence reduction initiative.

=== U.S. attorney ===
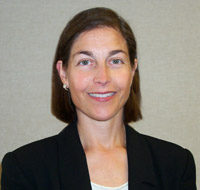
Immergut as U.S. attorney in 2008

Immergut was sworn in as interim United States attorney on October 3, 2003, and the United States Senate confirmed her nomination the same day. She was appointed by President George W. Bush to the position. Bush signed her commission to serve as the United States attorney for the District of Oregon on October 4, 2003, and she was sworn in on October 8. She succeeded Michael W. Mosman in that role.

As U.S. attorney, Immergut served as the district's top federal law enforcement official. She managed a staff of approximately 107 people, including 51 assistant U.S. attorneys, who handled civil litigation on behalf of the United States and criminal investigations and prosecutions involving violations of federal law such as white-collar crime, narcotics trafficking, violent crime, money laundering, and cybercrime. Immergut also served on the Advisory Committee of U.S. Attorneys.

In January 2008, Immergut applied to succeed Judge Garr King on the United States District Court for Oregon. She was initially considered the leading candidate for the post as the preferred choice of U.S. Senator Gordon H. Smith. But after news reports highlighted her role in the investigation of President Bill Clinton's sex scandal, she was not one of the final candidates for the position, which went to Marco A. Hernandez. She re-registered as a Republican at the beginning of Bush's first term as president, in the same month that she went to work for Mosman. She resigned from the office in July 2009 in order to be appointed as Multnomah County Circuit Court Judge.

=== Federal judicial service ===
On June 7, 2018, President Trump announced his intent to nominate Immergut to serve as a United States district judge for the United States District Court for the District of Oregon. On June 11, 2018, her nomination was sent to the Senate. Trump nominated Immergut to the seat vacated by Judge Anna J. Brown, who assumed senior status on July 27, 2017. On October 24, 2018, a hearing on her nomination was held before the Senate Judiciary Committee.

On January 3, 2019, her nomination was returned to the president under Rule XXXI, Paragraph 6 of the United States Senate. On January 23, 2019, Trump announced his intent to renominate Immergut for a federal judgeship. Her nomination was sent to the Senate later that day. On February 7, 2019, her nomination was reported out of committee by a 20–2 vote. On July 31, 2019, the Senate confirmed her nomination by voice vote. She received her judicial commission on August 5.

==== Notable rulings ====
On June 17, 2021, Immergut granted a preliminary injunction to Olivia Moultrie, ruling that the National Women's Soccer League could not enforce its rule requiring players to be at least 18 years old before signing a professional contract. Immergut's ruling held that the rule unlawfully "excludes female competitors from the only available professional soccer opportunity in the United States because they are under 18, regardless of talent, maturity, strength, and ability" and, pointing out that Major League Soccer did not have a similar age limit, that "the balance of equities and the public interest strongly favor affording girls in the United States the same opportunities as boys."

On March 10, 2023, Immergut ruled that Salem police officer Robert Johnston had no way of knowing he violated Eleaqia McCrae's rights when he shot her with rubber bullets at a protest in 2020, a legal principle known as qualified immunity. Immergut overturned a jury's unanimous verdict that Johnston violated McCrae’s Fourth Amendment right not to be subjected to excessive force and erased the jury's decision to award McCrae $250,000 for economic loss and $800,000 in other damages. On September 16, 2024, a three-judge panel of the 9th U.S. Circuit Court of Appeals found Immergut was wrong to throw out the jury’s award and that she should not have granted the officer immunity.

On July 14, 2023, Immergut upheld Oregon's gun control law, Measure 114, banning large capacity magazines and requiring a permit to purchase a gun, ruling that it falls in line with "the nation’s history and tradition of regulating uniquely dangerous features of weapons and firearms to protect public safety."

On October 4, 2025, Immergut temporarily blocked the Trump Administration from deploying the Oregon National Guard in Portland, pending further arguments in a lawsuit brought by the state and city, saying that President Trump's reasoning for doing so was "untethered to facts." In response, U.S. Secretary of Defense Pete Hegseth ordered the deployment of federalized California and Texas National Guard troops to Portland; Immergut blocked these actions in an emergency hearing on October 5, saying that the actions "appear to be in direct contravention of my order." In response, Trump said, "that judge ought to be ashamed of himself", apparently unaware that Immergut, who he appointed in 2019, is a woman. On November 7, after a three-day trial, Immergut made her earlier temporary injunctions permanent, finding that Trump "did not have a lawful basis to federalize the National Guard".

== Popular culture ==
Immergut was portrayed by Lindsey Broad in Impeachment: American Crime Story.

== Personal life ==
In 1996 Immergut moved to Portland, Oregon, where she married James T. McDermott and was hired by Multnomah County.

Legal offices
| Preceded by Michael W. Mosman | United States Attorney for the District of Oregon; 2003–2009 | Succeeded by Dwight Holton |
| Preceded by Dale R. Koch | Judge of the Multnomah County Circuit Court; 2009–2019 | Succeeded by Steffan Alexander |
| Preceded by Anna J. Brown | Judge of the United States District Court for the District of Oregon; 2019–present | Incumbent |
| Preceded by Robert B. Kugler | Judge of the United States Foreign Intelligence Surveillance Court; 2024–present | Incumbent |
