= Sohappy v. Smith =

1969 federal case in Oregon

Sohappy v. Smith and United States v. Oregon
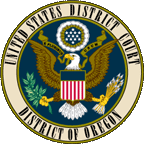
- Court: United States District Court for the District of Oregon
- Full case name: Richard SOHAPPY et al., Plaintiffs, v. McKee A. SMITH, Edward G. Huffschmidt, J. I. Eoff, Commissioners, Oregon Fish Commission; Robert W. Schoning, Director, Oregon Fish Commission, their agents, servants, employees and those persons in active concert or participation with them; John W. McKean, Director, Oregon Game Commission, his agents, servants, employees and those persons in active concert or participation with him, Defendants. UNITED STATES of America, Plaintiff, v. STATE OF OREGON, Defendant, and The Confederated Tribes of the Warm Springs Reservation of Oregon; Confederated Tribes & Bands of the Yakima Indian Nation; Confederated Tribes of the Umatilla Indian Reservation; and Nez Perce Tribe of Idaho, Intervenors.
- Decided: July 8, 1969
- Citation: 302 F. Supp. 899

Court membership
- Judge sitting: Robert C. Belloni

Sohappy v. Smith, 302 F. Supp. 899 (D. Or. 1969), was a federal case heard by the United States District Court for the District of Oregon, decided in 1969 and amended in 1975. It began with 14 members of the Yakama tribe who sued the U.S. state of Oregon over its fishing regulations. The federal court combined the case with another case, United States v. Oregon, in which the U.S. federal government sued the state along with the Yakama, Warm Springs, Umatilla, and Nez Perce tribes.

The ruling issued by judge Robert C. Belloni in 1969 is known as the "Belloni Decision" or the "Fair Share Doctrine." It is an interpretation of the decision in Puyallup Tribe v. Department of Game of Washington (1968).

Belloni's ruling acknowledged the right of several tribes of Native Americans to fish in the Columbia River with minimal regulation by the government of the United States or by local governments.

The rights were further clarified in United States v. Washington in 1974.

== See also ==
- Billy Frank Jr.
- Corfield v. Coryell
