= Joe Biden judicial appointment controversies =

Overview of the judicial appointment controversies of Joe Biden

U.S. president Joe Biden began his presidency with fewer judicial vacancies to fill than his predecessor. He pledged to nominate people with diverse backgrounds and professional experience; further he pledged to nominate the first black woman to the Supreme Court of the United States.

By the end of 2021, 41 judges had been confirmed, the most since Ronald Reagan. By the end of his first year in office, Biden had nominated 73 individuals for federal judgeships, one more than Donald Trump during the same point in his first presidency.

== List of unsuccessful federal judicial nominations ==
As of January 3, 2025, Biden had made 18 nominations for federal judgeships that were not confirmed by the Senate and were not pending before the Senate. Of these, 3 were withdrawn by President Biden and 15 expired at an adjournment of the Senate.

Nominee	Court	Nomination date	Date of final action	Final action	Subsequent federal judicial nominations	Seat filled by	Ref.
Courts of appeals
Jabari Wamble	10th Cir.	September 6, 2022	January 3, 2023	returned to the president	D. Kan. (nominated February 27, 2023, withdrawn May 30, 2023)	Richard Federico	
Michael Delaney	1st Cir.	January 31, 2023	May 30, 2023	withdrawn by Pres. Biden		Seth Aframe	
Adeel A. Mangi	3rd Cir.	November 27, 2023	January 3, 2025	returned to the president		Emil Bove	
Karla M. Campbell	6th Cir.	June 4, 2024	January 3, 2025	returned to the president		Whitney Hermandorfer	
Julia M. Lipez	1st Cir.	June 4, 2024	January 3, 2025	returned to the president		Joshua Dunlap	
Ryan Y. Park	4th Cir.	July 8, 2024	December 12, 2024	withdrawn by Pres. Biden		vacancy rescinded	
District courts
William Pocan	E.D. Wis.	December 15, 2021	January 3, 2023	returned to the president		Byron B. Conway	
Jorge Alberto Rodriguez	N.D.N.Y.	July 13, 2022	January 3, 2023	returned to the president		Anthony Brindisi	
Charnelle Bjelkengren	E.D. Wash.	September 19, 2022	January 3, 2024	returned to the president		Rebecca L. Pennell	
Todd E. Edelman	D.D.C.	September 27, 2022	January 3, 2024	returned to the president		Sparkle L. Sooknanan	
Scott Colom	N.D. Miss.	November 15, 2022	January 3, 2024	returned to the president		James D. Maxwell II	
Marian Gaston	S.D. Cal.	January 23, 2023	January 3, 2024	returned to the president		TBD	
Jabari Wamble	D. Kan.	February 27, 2023	May 30, 2023	withdrawn by Pres. Biden		Anthony J. Powell	
Colleen Holland	W.D.N.Y.	September 11, 2023	January 3, 2024	returned to the president		Meredith Vacca	
Rebecca S. Kanter	S.D. Cal.	February 1, 2024	January 3, 2025	returned to the president		TBD	
Detra Shaw-Wilder	S.D. Fla.	March 21, 2024	January 3, 2025	returned to the president		Ed Artau	
Danna Jackson	D. Mont.	April 30, 2024	January 3, 2025	returned to the president		William W. Mercer	
Sarah Netburn	S.D.N.Y.	April 30, 2024	January 3, 2025	returned to the president		TBD	

== Supreme Court ==
=== Confirmed nominee ===
- Ketanji Brown Jackson (of Washington, D.C.): On February 25, 2022, President Joe Biden announced that he would nominate Judge Ketanji Brown Jackson to succeed Stephen Breyer as an associate justice of the Supreme Court of the United States. At the time of her pending nomination, Jackson was a judge on the United States Court of Appeals for the District of Columbia Circuit, to which she was appointed by Biden in 2021. On February 28, 2022, her nomination was sent to the Senate. Senate Minority Leader Mitch McConnell characterized Jackson as "the favored choice of far-left dark money groups that have spent years attacking the legitimacy and structure of the court itself". The Republican National Committee called Jackson "a radical, left-wing activist who would rubber stamp Biden's disastrous agenda". Republican Senator Lindsey Graham, who had previously voted in favor of Jackson's confirmation to the DC Circuit Court of Appeals, stated that the nomination "means the radical Left has won President Biden over yet again". Her confirmation hearings before the Senate Judiciary Committee opened on March 21. After the Judiciary Committee deadlocked in an 11–11 vote, her nomination was advanced on April 4 by a 53–47 procedural vote in the Senate. She was subsequently confirmed by the same margin on April 7, 2022.

== Appellate nominees ==
=== Confirmed nominees ===
==== United States Court of Appeals for the First Circuit ====
- Julie Rikelman (of Massachusetts): On July 29, 2022, President Joe Biden announced his intent to nominate Rikelman to serve as a United States circuit judge of the United States Court of Appeals for the First Circuit. On August 1, 2022, her nomination was sent to the Senate. President Biden nominated Rikelman to the seat vacated by Judge Sandra Lynch, who announced her intent to assume senior status upon confirmation of a successor. Rikelman was unanimously rated "well qualified" for the judgeship by the American Bar Association's Standing Committee on the Federal Judiciary. On September 21, 2022, a hearing on her nomination was held before the Senate Judiciary Committee. During her confirmation hearing, she was questioned by several Republican senators over her outspoken advocacy for abortion. Rikelman was also questioned about a law review article she authored discussing appellate decisions permitting mandatory blood collection for DNA testing under the Fourth Amendment, arguing that such mandatory collection was prohibited by the U.S. Constitution. On December 1, 2022, her nomination was deadlocked by the Judiciary Committee by an 11–11 vote. On January 3, 2023, her nomination was returned to the president; she was renominated later the same day. On February 9, 2023, her nomination was reported out of committee by an 11–10 vote. On June 15, 2023, the Senate invoked cloture on Rikelman's nomination by a 53–45 vote. On June 20, 2023, her nomination was confirmed by a 51–43 vote.
- Seth Aframe (of New Hampshire): On October 4, 2023, President Joe Biden nominated Aframe to serve as a United States circuit judge of the United States Court of Appeals for the First Circuit. President Biden nominated Aframe to the seat vacated by Judge Jeffrey R. Howard, who assumed senior status on March 31, 2022. On November 1, 2023, a hearing on his nomination was held before the Senate Judiciary Committee. During his confirmation hearing, Republican senators sought to paint Aframe as being soft on crime, pointing to a 2020 case he tried in which he recommended a 30-year sentence for a man convicted of sexually assaulting a minor. On November 30, 2023, his nomination was favorably reported out of committee by an 11–10 party-line vote. On January 3, 2024, his nomination was returned to the president under Rule XXXI, Paragraph 6 of the United States Senate and he was renominated on January 8, 2024. On January 18, 2024, his nomination was favorably reported out of committee by an 11–10 party-line vote. On May 16, 2024, the Senate invoked cloture on his nomination by a 52–43 vote. On May 20, 2024, the Senate confirmed his nomination by a 49–40 vote.

==== United States Court of Appeals for the Second Circuit ====
- Eunice C. Lee (of New York): On May 12, 2021, President Biden nominated Lee to serve as a United States circuit judge for the United States Court of Appeals for the Second Circuit to the seat vacated by Judge Robert Katzmann, who assumed senior status on January 21, 2021. On June 9, 2021, a hearing on her nomination was held before the Senate Judiciary Committee. During her confirmation hearing in 2021, she distanced herself from the contents of a letter she wrote as an Ohio State undergrad in 1991, which talks about then-Supreme Court nominee Clarence Thomas being a "black conservative." On July 15, 2021, her nomination was reported out of committee by an 11–10 vote with Senator Lindsey Graham passed on the vote. On August 5, 2021, the Senate invoked cloture on Lee's nomination by a 50–49 vote, with Senator Graham absent. On August 7, 2021, her nomination was confirmed by a 50–47 vote.

==== United States Court of Appeals for the Third Circuit ====
- Arianna J. Freeman (of Pennsylvania): On January 19, 2022, President Joe Biden announced his intent to nominate Freeman to serve as a United States circuit judge of the United States Court of Appeals for the Third Circuit. President Biden nominated Freeman to the seat vacated by Judge Theodore McKee, who on July 29, 2021, notified the White House that he intended to assume senior status upon confirmation of his successor. On January 28, 2022, following Justice Stephen Breyer's announcement of his intention to retire as an Associate Justice of the U.S. Supreme Court, Freeman was mentioned as one of the potential nominees for a Supreme Court appointment by President Joe Biden. On March 2, 2022, a hearing on her nomination was held before the Senate Judiciary Committee. During her confirmation hearing, Republican senators criticized her work as a public defender. On April 4, 2022, the committee were deadlocked on her nomination by an 11–11 vote. On June 22, 2022, the Senate discharged her nomination from committee by a 50–48 vote. On September 12, 2022, the United States Senate invoked cloture on her nomination by a 45–44 vote. On September 13, 2022, the Senate did not confirm her nomination by a 47–50 vote. On September 29, 2022, her nomination was confirmed by a 50–47 vote.

==== United States Court of Appeals for the Sixth Circuit ====
- Rachel Bloomekatz (of Ohio): On May 25, 2022, President Joe Biden nominated Bloomekatz to serve as a United States circuit judge of the United States Court of Appeals for the Sixth Circuit. President Biden nominated Bloomekatz to the seat to be vacated by Judge R. Guy Cole Jr., who announced his intent to assume senior status upon confirmation of a successor. A hearing on her nomination was held before the Senate Judiciary Committee on June 22, 2022. During her confirmation hearing, Republican senators questioned her about gun control cases and the pro bono work that she had been involved with. On August 4, 2022, the Senate Judiciary Committee was deadlocked on her nomination by a 10–10–2 vote. On January 3, 2023, her nomination was returned to the president; she was renominated later the same day. On February 9, 2023, her nomination was reported out of committee by an 11–10 vote. On July 13, 2023, the Senate invoked cloture on her nomination by a 50–45 vote, with Senator Joe Manchin voting against the motion to invoke cloture on her nomination. On July 18, 2023, her nomination was confirmed by a 50–48 vote, with Senator Joe Manchin voting against confirmation of her nomination.
- Andre Mathis (of Tennessee): On November 17, 2021, President Biden announced his intent to nominate Mathis to serve as a United States circuit judge of the United States Court of Appeals for the Sixth Circuit; his nomination was sent to the Senate the following day. President Biden nominated Mathis to the seat vacated by Judge Bernice B. Donald, who announced her intent to assume senior status upon confirmation of her successor. On January 3, 2022, his nomination was returned to the president; he was renominated later the same day. On January 12, 2022, a hearing on his nomination was held before the Senate Judiciary Committee. During the hearing, Senator Marsha Blackburn said she had "serious concerns" about Mathis' experience and referenced his "rap sheet" due in part to three previous speeding tickets. She stated, "He has a rap sheet with a laundry list of citations, including multiple failures to appear in court. In Tennessee, we expect our judges to respect the law. If Mr. Mathis thought he was above the law before, imagine how he'll conduct himself if he's confirmed as a federal judge." Blackburn and fellow senator Bill Hagerty recommended an alternative pick, Camille McMullen, a Democratic appointee to the Tennessee Court of Criminal Appeals who is also Black. On February 10, 2022, his nomination was reported favorably out of committee in a 12–10 vote. On September 7, 2022, the United States Senate invoked cloture on his nomination by a 48–45 vote. On September 8, 2022, the Senate confirmed his nomination by a 48–47 vote.
- Kevin G. Ritz (of Tennessee): On March 20, 2024, President Joe Biden announced his intent to nominate Ritz to serve as a United States circuit judge of the United States Court of Appeals for the Sixth Circuit. His nomination drew opposition from Senator Marsha Blackburn, who said the White House had abandoned discussions with her and fellow Tennessee senator Bill Hagerty about finding a nominee for the position. On March 21, 2024, his nomination was sent to the Senate. President Biden nominated Ritz to the seat being vacated by Judge Julia Smith Gibbons, who announced her intent to assume senior status upon confirmation of a successor. On April 17, 2024, a hearing on his nomination was held before the Senate Judiciary Committee. During his hearing, Republican senators raised questions about an ethics complaint filed against Ritz during his time as an assistant United States attorney. In the case, the defense counsel accused Ritz of misrepresenting charges during a plea agreement in a criminal case. Ritz said he was unaware of the ethics complaint that had been filed against him. He was also questioned about why federal gun charges were not brought against a man allegedly involved in the fatal shooting of Memphis police officer Joseph McKinney. On May 9, 2024, his nomination was favorably reported out of the Senate Judiciary Committee by an 11–10 party-line vote. On September 12, 2024, the United States Senate invoked cloture on his nomination by a 49–42 vote, with Senator Kyrsten Sinema voting against the motion. On September 16, 2024, his nomination was confirmed by a 48–46 vote.

==== United States Court of Appeals for the Seventh Circuit ====
- Nancy L. Maldonado: On February 21, 2024, President Joe Biden announced his intent to nominate Maldonado to serve as a circuit judge of the United States Court of Appeals for the Seventh Circuit. On February 27, 2024, her nomination was sent to the Senate. President Biden nominated Maldonado to the seat being vacated by Judge Ilana Rovner, who announced her intent to assume senior status upon confirmation of a successor. On March 20, 2024, a hearing on her nomination was held before the Senate Judiciary Committee. During her confirmation hearing, she was questioned by Republican senators over her case backlog, as, with 125 motions having been pending for more than six months without a ruling, Maldonado held one of the largest case backlogs of any federal trial court judge in the nation. On April 18, 2024, her nomination was favorably reported out of committee by an 11–10 party-line vote. On June 20, 2024, the Senate invoked cloture on her nomination by a 43–27 vote. On July 8, 2024, her nomination was confirmed by a 47–43 vote.

==== United States Court of Appeals for the Ninth Circuit ====
- Lucy Koh (of California): On September 8, 2021, President Biden announced his intention to renominate Koh to be a United States circuit judge of the United States Court of Appeals for the Ninth Circuit. On September 20, 2021, her nomination was sent to the Senate. President Biden nominated Koh to the seat to be vacated by Judge Richard Paez, who announced his intent to assume senior status upon confirmation of a successor. On October 6, 2021, a hearing on her nomination was held before the Senate Judiciary Committee. During her hearing, Koh was criticized by Republicans senators for her decisions related to religious rights during the COVID-19 pandemic. On October 28, 2021, her nomination was reported out of committee by a 13–9 vote. On December 9, 2021, the U.S. Senate invoked cloture on her nomination by a 51–38 vote. On December 13, 2021, Koh was confirmed by a 50–45 vote.
- Anthony Johnstone (of Montana): On September 2, 2022, President Joe Biden announced his intent to nominate Johnstone to serve as a United States circuit judge of the United States Court of Appeals for the Ninth Circuit. On September 6, 2022, his nomination was sent to the Senate. President Biden will nominate Johnstone to the seat to be vacated by Judge Sidney R. Thomas, who announced his intent to assume senior status upon confirmation of a successor. Senator Steven Daines of Montana opposed the nomination, claiming that Johnstone was too political and partisan to be a judge and claiming the White House had not adequately consulted him on the nomination. On October 12, 2022, a hearing on his nomination was held before the Senate Judiciary Committee. He was sharply questioned about his views on election integrity and religious freedom issues. On December 1, 2022, his nomination was reported out of committee by an 11–10 vote, with Senator Lindsey Graham passing on the vote. On January 3, 2023, his nomination was returned to the president; he was renominated later the same day. On February 2, 2023, the committee were deadlocked on his nomination by a 10–10 vote, meaning that his nomination could not be advanced without a decisive vote to move forward because of the deadlocked vote. On February 9, 2023, his nomination was reported out of committee by an 11–10 vote. On April 27, 2023, the Senate invoked cloture on his nomination by a 50–45 vote. On May 1, 2023, his nomination was confirmed by a 49–45 vote.
- Jennifer Sung (of Oregon): On June 30, 2021, President Biden announced his intent to nominate Sung to serve as a United States circuit judge of the United States Court of Appeals for the Ninth Circuit. On July 13, 2021, her nomination was sent to the Senate. President Biden nominated Sung to the seat to be vacated by Judge Susan P. Graber, who announced her intent to assume senior status upon confirmation of a successor. On September 14, 2021, a hearing on her nomination was held before the Senate Judiciary Committee. During the hearing, Senators questioned her about her decision to sign a letter regarding Brett Kavanaugh's nomination to the U.S. Supreme Court. The letter accused Kavanaugh of being an "intellectually and morally bankrupt ideologue" and claimed that "people will die if he is confirmed". Sung said she recognized that much of the letter's rhetoric "was overheated," but she did not disavow the letter or say "whether she thought Kavanaugh was indeed 'intellectually and morally bankrupt.'" The Senate Judiciary Committee was deadlocked by a 10–10 vote. On November 3, 2021, the Senate discharged Sung's nomination from committee by a 49–49 vote, with Vice President Kamala Harris breaking the tie. On December 9, 2021, the U.S. Senate invoked cloture on her nomination by a 48–39 vote. On December 15, 2021, her nomination was confirmed by a 50–49 vote.

==== United States Court of Appeals for the Eleventh Circuit ====
- Nancy Abudu (of Georgia): On December 23, 2021, President Joe Biden announced his intent to nominate Abudu to serve as a United States circuit judge of the United States Court of Appeals for the Eleventh Circuit. On January 10, 2022, her nomination was sent to the Senate. President Biden nominated Abudu to the seat vacated by Judge Beverly B. Martin, who retired on September 30, 2021. On April 27, 2022, a hearing on her nomination was held before the Senate Judiciary Committee. Her nomination attracted intense Republican opposition due to Abudu's work for the Southern Poverty Law Center, which has labeled some of the Judiciary Committee's Republican members as "white supremacists". On May 26, 2022, the Judiciary Committee were deadlocked on her nomination by an 11–11 vote. On January 3, 2023, her nomination was returned to the president; she was renominated later the same day. On February 9, 2023, her nomination was reported out of committee by an 11–10 vote. Abudu did not receive any Republican support in the committee vote because Republicans questioned whether her advocacy work would prevent her from being impartial on the bench. On May 17, 2023, the Senate invoked cloture on her nomination by a 50–48 vote, with Senator Joe Manchin voting against the motion to invoke cloture of Abudu's nomination. It was the first time that Senator Manchin opposed a judicial pick. On May 18, 2023, her nomination was confirmed by a 49–47 vote, with Senator Joe Manchin being the only Democrat to vote against her confirmation. Senator Manchin's no vote was the first time any Democrat has opposed one of President Biden's judicial nominees on the Senate floor.
- Embry Kidd (of Florida): On May 8, 2024, President Joe Biden announced his intent to nominate Kidd to serve as a United States circuit judge of the United States Court of Appeals for the Eleventh Circuit. On May 24, 2024, his nomination was sent to the Senate. President Biden nominated Kidd to the seat being vacated by Judge Charles R. Wilson, who will assume senior status on December 31, 2024. At first, Kidd was not expected to be controversial. On June 5, 2024, a hearing on his nomination was held before the Senate Judiciary Committee. During his confirmation hearing, he was questioned by Republican Senators about his record and his views about a controversial law review article written by a law school classmate. On June 20, 2024, it was discovered that Kidd had withheld two overturned rulings from the U.S. Senate in which involved child sex crimes. Republicans accused Kidd of being deceptive and extreme in his views. On July 11, 2024, his nomination was favorably reported out of the Senate Judiciary Committee by a party line 11–10 vote. On November 14, 2024, the United States Senate invoked cloture on his nomination by a 49–44 vote, with Senator Joe Manchin voting against the motion. On November 18, 2024, the Senate confirmed his nomination by a 49–45 vote.

=== Failed nominees ===
==== United States Court of Appeals for the First Circuit ====
- Michael Delaney (of New Hampshire): On January 31, 2023, President Joe Biden nominated Delaney to serve as a United States circuit judge of the United States Court of Appeals for the First Circuit. He was nominated to the seat vacated by Judge Jeffrey R. Howard, who assumed senior status on March 31, 2022. On February 15, 2023, a hearing on his nomination was held before the Senate Judiciary Committee. During the hearing, Delaney received criticism from senators regarding his authoring and filing of a motion seeking to strip a minor female rape victim of anonymity as part of representation of a New Hampshire private school. The allegations were made by the victim of the 2015 assault in a letter to the panel. The victim also wrote an opinion editorial in The Boston Globe saying Delaney "doesn't deserve to be a judge" and that supporting his nomination is equivalent to condoning "what Delaney and St. Paul's School put me and my family through". Owen Labrie was 18 years old at the time he was accused of raping the then 15-year-old student. Some Democrats had concerns about his nomination over his handling of the case. Other Democrats and groups have expressed concern over a legal brief that defends a law related to abortion. On May 3, 2023, it was reported that since 2018, Delaney had been a board member of the New England Legal Foundation as well as on their legal review committee. This foundation has opposed some of President Biden's positions on climate change, consumer protection, in addition to labor rights. On May 18, 2023, Delaney asked that his nomination be withdrawn because of the bipartisan opposition. On May 30, 2023, the White House officially withdrew his nomination. On May 20, 2024, Seth Aframe was confirmed to Howard's seat.

==== United States Court of Appeals for the Third Circuit ====
- Adeel Mangi (of New Jersey): On November 15, 2023, President Joe Biden announced his intent to nominate Mangi to serve as a United States circuit judge of the United States Court of Appeals for the Third Circuit. On November 27, 2023, his nomination was sent to the Senate. President Biden nominated Mangi to the seat vacated by Judge Joseph A. Greenaway Jr., who retired on June 15, 2023. On December 13, 2023, a hearing on his nomination was held before the Senate Judiciary Committee. During his confirmation hearing, he was questioned by Republican senators over his work on the advisory board of Rutgers University's Center for Security, Race and Rights and whether he condemned the 2023 Hamas-led attack on Israel. On January 3, 2024, his nomination was returned to the President under Rule XXXI, Paragraph 6 of the United States Senate and he was renominated on January 8, 2024. On January 18, 2024, his nomination was favorably reported out of committee by an 11–10 party-line vote. Later reporting revealed that Mangi had failed to disclose the fact that he moderated a panel in which a financier of the Palestinian Islamic Jihad participated. Mangi later apologized to the Senate for his lack of reporting on the event, saying that it was an "inadvertent omission". Mangi faced further criticism relating to his role on the advisory board of the legal advocacy group Alliance for Families of Justice (AFJ); an organization which had previously represented litigants charged with killing a police officer. Democratic opposition later began to emerge with Senators Catherine Cortez-Masto, Jacky Rosen and Joe Manchin announcing their opposition to his nomination. On January 3, 2025, his nomination was returned to the president. On July 29, 2025, Emil Bove was confirmed to Greenaway's seat.

== District court nominees ==
=== Confirmed nominees ===
==== United States District Court for the District of Colorado ====
- Kato Crews: On February 22, 2023, President Joe Biden announced his intent to nominate Crews to serve as a United States district judge of the United States District Court for the District of Colorado. On February 27, 2023, his nomination was sent to the Senate. President Biden nominated Crews to a seat to be vacated by Judge Raymond P. Moore, who assumed senior status on June 20, 2023. Crews is only the third magistrate judge to be nominated for a district court vacancy in Colorado. On March 22, 2023, a hearing on his nomination was held before the Senate Judiciary Committee. During his confirmation hearing, he was unable to answer a question by Senator John Kennedy, in which he asked him what is The Brady Motion. His answers made some national news and some senators claimed that Crews didn't have the requisite knowledge to be a federal judge. On May 11, 2023, his nomination was reported out of committee by an 11–10 party-line vote. On January 10, 2024, the United States Senate invoked cloture on his nomination by a 51–47 vote, with Senator Kyrsten Sinema voting against the motion to invoke cloture on his nomination. Later that day, his nomination was confirmed by a 51–48 vote, with Senator Sinema voting against his confirmation.

==== United States District Court for the District of Columbia ====
- Amir Ali: On January 10, 2024, President Joe Biden announced his intent to nominate Ali to serve as a United States district judge for the United States District Court for the District of Columbia. On February 1, 2024, President Biden nominated Ali to a seat vacated by Judge Beryl Howell, who assumed senior status on February 1, 2024. On February 8, a hearing on his nomination was held before the Senate Judiciary Committee. During his hearing, Senator Lindsey Graham questioned him over his leadership of the MacArthur Center and statements made by the group's previous director, who said in 2020 that advocates for defunding police agencies were part of a "movement toward making police departments obsolete." Ali responded, "I do not believe law enforcement is or should be obsolete, or defunded." On March 7, 2024, his nomination was reported out of committee by an 11–10 party-line vote. On November 20, 2024, the United States Senate invoked cloture on his nomination by a 50–48 vote. Later that day, his nomination was confirmed by a 50–49 vote. Ali became the first Arab American federal judge to serve in D.C.

==== United States District Court for the District of Connecticut ====
- Sarah F. Russell: On October 4, 2023, President Joe Biden nominated Russell to serve as a United States district judge of the United States District Court for the District of Connecticut. President Biden nominated Russell to the seat vacated by Judge Sarah A. L. Merriam, who was elevated to the United States Court of Appeals for the Second Circuit on September 28, 2022. On November 1, 2023, a hearing on her nomination was held before the Senate Judiciary Committee. Republicans fiercely denounced her support for criminal justice reform and claimed she would be a threat to public safety. Senator John Kennedy brought up a letter she wrote to Governor Ned Lamont recommending widespread release of violent felons during the COVID-19 pandemic and accused her of deliberately concealing the letter from the Senate. On November 30, 2023, her nomination was reported out of committee by an 11–10 vote. On January 3, 2024, her nomination was returned to the president under Rule XXXI, Paragraph 6 of the United States Senate and she was renominated on January 8, 2024. On January 18, 2024, her nomination was reported out of committee by an 11–10 party-line vote. On November 19, 2024, the Senate invoked cloture on her nomination by a 50–45 vote. Later that day, her nomination was confirmed by a 50–44 vote.

==== United States District Court for the District of Massachusetts ====
- Margaret R. Guzman: On July 13, 2022, President Joe Biden nominated Guzman to serve as a United States district judge of the United States District Court for the District of Massachusetts. President Biden nominated Guzman to the seat vacated by Judge Timothy S. Hillman, who assumed senior status on July 1, 2022. On September 21, 2022, a hearing on her nomination was held before the Senate Judiciary Committee. Conservatives and law enforcement attacked the nomination, claiming that she is reflexively pro-criminal defendant and pointing out that Guzman had acquitted all 149 defendants who appeared before her in bench trials on drunk driving charges while serving as a judge on Dudley District Court. On December 1, 2022, her nomination was reported out of committee by a 12–10 vote. On January 3, 2023, her nomination was returned to the president; she was renominated later the same day. On February 2, 2023, her nomination was reported out of committee by an 11–9 vote. On February 28, 2023, the Senate invoked cloture on her nomination by a 49–48 vote, with the Vice President Kamala Harris voting for the affirmative. On March 1, 2023, her nomination was confirmed by a 49–48 vote, with the vice president casting the tie-breaking vote.

==== United States District Court for the Middle District of Pennsylvania ====
- Karoline Mehalchick: On June 28, 2023, President Joe Biden announced his intent to nominate Mehalchick to serve as a United States district judge of the United States District Court for the Middle District of Pennsylvania. Mehalchick was recommended to the White House by Pennsylvania senators Bob Casey Jr. and John Fetterman. On July 12, 2023, her nomination was sent to the Senate. President Biden nominated her to the seat vacated by Judge John E. Jones III, who retired on August 1, 2021. On July 26, 2023, a hearing on her nomination was held before the Senate Judiciary Committee. During her confirmation hearing, Senators Marsha Blackburn, John Kennedy, Ted Cruz, and Lindsey Graham vigorously cross-examined her over her recommendation that Pennsylvania State University president Graham Spanier's child endangerment conviction be reversed and remanded for a new trial, which was adopted by the District Court, then later overturned by the United States Court of Appeals for the Third Circuit on the ground that the District Court had not correctly determined whether Spanier was entitled to federal habeas corpus relief. Senators Graham and Kennedy pointed out that 31 of her recommendations to the District Court had not been adopted in full by higher courts, repeatedly characterizing these as "reversals." Mehalchick defended her record by stating that fewer than 2% of her rulings had been overturned by higher courts. On September 14, 2023, her nomination was favorably reported out of the Senate Judiciary Committee by an 11–10 party-line vote. On January 31, 2024, the United States Senate invoked cloture on her nomination by a 50–49 vote, with Senator Joe Manchin voting against the motion. Later that day her nomination was confirmed by a 50–49 vote, with Senator Manchin voting against confirmation.

==== United States District Court for the Northern District of California ====
- Eumi K. Lee: On July 27, 2023, President Joe Biden nominated Alameda County Superior Court Judge Lee to serve as a United States district judge of the United States District Court for the Northern District of California. President Biden nominated Lee to the seat vacated by Judge William Orrick III, who assumed senior status on May 17, 2023. On September 6, 2023, a hearing on her nomination was held before the Senate Judiciary Committee. During her confirmation hearing, Lee was questioned about her views on affirmative action and her prior membership on the board of the Asian Law Caucus who had previously supported the practice. In addition, Lee was questioned regarding past writings on the treatment of transgender, illegal immigrant, and women prisoners in California. On November 9, 2023, her nomination was favorably reported out of committee by an 11–10 party-line vote. On November 13, 2023, her nomination was returned to the Judiciary Committee because of issues regarding proxy voting in committee. On November 30, 2023, during the first committee vote, her nomination failed to be reported out of committee by a 10–0–9 vote with all committee Republicans in attendance not voting, along with Democratic Senator Chris Coons. In a second vote, her nomination was favorably reported out of committee by an 11–10 party-line vote. On January 3, 2024, her nomination was returned to the president under Rule XXXI, Paragraph 6 of the United States Senate and she was renominated on January 8, 2024. On January 18, 2024, her nomination was favorably reported out of committee by an 11–10 party-line vote. On March 20, 2024, the Senate invoked cloture on her nomination by a 50–49 vote, with Senator Joe Manchin voting against the motion. Later that day, her nomination was confirmed by a 50–49 vote, with Senator Manchin voting against confirmation.

==== United States District Court for the District of Nevada ====
- Anne Traum: On November 3, 2021, President Joe Biden announced his intent to nominate Traum to serve as a United States district judge of the United States District Court for the District of Nevada. On December 15, 2021, a hearing on her nomination was held before the Senate Judiciary Committee. The confirmation hearings were particularly contentious when questioned by Senator John Kennedy of Louisiana. He asked nine separate times whether criminal misbehavior should be forgiven in the name of social justice without receiving a direct yes or no response. On January 3, 2022, her nomination was returned to the president; she was later renominated the same day. On January 20, 2022, her nomination was reported out of committee by a 12–10 vote. On March 16, 2022, the United States Senate invoked cloture on her nomination by a 52–45 vote. On March 23, 2022, her nomination was confirmed by a 49–47 vote.

==== United States District Court for the District of New Jersey ====
- Christine O'Hearn: On April 29, 2021, President Joe Biden nominated O'Hearn to serve as a United States district judge of the United States District Court for the District of New Jersey to the seat vacated by Judge Robert B. Kugler, who assumed senior status on November 2, 2018. On June 23, 2021, a hearing on her nomination was held before the Senate Judiciary Committee. Progressive magazine The American Prospect critiqued O'Hearn's nomination, saying she had "fought against workplace sexual harassment cases, defended police departments, and represented management during union drives." On July 22, 2021, her nomination was reported out of committee by a 12–10 vote. On October 19, 2021, the Senate confirmed her nomination by a 53–44 vote.
- Karen M. Williams: On March 30, 2021, President Joe Biden nominated Williams to serve as a United States district judge of the United States District Court for the District of New Jersey to the seat vacated by Judge Jerome B. Simandle, who assumed senior status on May 31, 2017. Progressive magazine The American Prospect criticized Williams' nomination, saying "Williams spent many years as a management-side labor and employment attorney, even arguing cases against workplace sexual harassment claims, a troubling background to those hoping for judicial appointments that might defend workers." On July 14, 2021, a hearing on her nomination was held before the Senate Judiciary Committee. On August 5, 2021, her nomination was reported out of committee by a 16–6 vote. On October 26, 2021, the United States Senate confirmed her nomination by a 56–38 vote.

==== United States District Court for the Eastern District of New York ====
- Nusrat Jahan Choudhury: On January 19, 2022, President Joe Biden nominated Choudhury to serve as a United States district judge of the United States District Court for the Eastern District of New York. President Biden nominated Choudhury to the seat vacated by Judge Joseph F. Bianco, who was elevated to the United States Court of Appeals for the Second Circuit on May 17, 2019. A longtime lawyer for the ACLU, she immediately generated conservative objections. On April 27, 2022, a hearing on her nomination was held before the Senate Judiciary Committee. During her confirmation hearing, she was asked whether she had said "the killing of unarmed Black men by police happens every day in America." Choudhury at first testified she was not sure she made that statement but then said that if she had she "said it in my role as an advocate." Her testimony caused several law enforcement groups, including the Fraternal Order of Police and the Sergeants Benevolent Association, to oppose her nomination. Two weeks after her hearing, Choudhury sent a letter to the Judiciary Committee denying that she had made the statement. Republicans on the Judiciary Committee requested a second hearing due to Choudhury's contradictory statements, but Senator Dick Durbin rejected the request for a second hearing. On May 26, 2022, her nomination was reported out of the committee by a 12–10 vote. On January 3, 2023, her nomination was returned to the president; she was renominated later the same day. On February 9, 2023, her nomination was reported out of committee by an 11–10 vote. On June 14, 2023, the Senate invoked cloture on her nomination by a 50–47 vote. On June 15, 2023, her nomination was confirmed by a 50–49 vote, with Senator Joe Manchin voting against confirmation because her "previous statements call into question her ability to be unbiased towards the work of our brave law enforcement."

==== United States District Court for the Southern District of New York ====
- Jennifer H. Rearden: On May 4, 2020, President Donald Trump nominated her to a seat on the same court as part of a bipartisan package of nominees. She was renominated On January 19, 2022, by President Joe Biden to serve as a United States district judge of the United States District Court for the Southern District of New York. Rearden's nomination was criticized by Congresswoman Rashida Tlaib, who brought up Rearden's controversial role in the prosecution of Steven Donziger. Rearden represented Chevron in its countersuit against Donziger, an environmental lawyer who brought a class action case against Chevron related to environmental damage and health effects caused by oil drilling. On March 2, 2022, a hearing on her nomination was held before the Senate Judiciary Committee. On April 4, 2022, her nomination was reported out of committee by a 22–0 vote, which marked the only time to date that certain Republican senators voted for a Biden judicial nominee (namely Cruz, Lee, Cotton, Hawley and Blackburn). On September 8, 2022, the United States Senate confirmed her nomination by a voice vote. After the Senate confirmed her nomination, U.S. Senator Elizabeth Warren announced that she would have voted against her nomination if the Senate proceeded to a roll call vote on Rearden's nomination.
- Dale Ho: On September 30, 2021, President Biden nominated Ho to serve as a United States district judge of the United States District Court for the Southern District of New York, to the seat vacated by Judge Katherine B. Forrest, who resigned on September 11, 2018. On December 1, 2021, a hearing on his nomination was held before the Senate Judiciary Committee. During his confirmation hearing, Ho apologized for his "overheated rhetoric" on social media, which included past tweets critical of three Republican members of the Senate Judiciary Committee, Marsha Blackburn, Mike Lee, and Tom Cotton. He was questioned by senators over a tweet in which he appeared to refer to himself as a "wild-eyed sort of leftist"; he explained that he was "referring to a caricature of the way other people may have described me, not how I would describe myself." A resurfaced video from 2018 showed Ho calling the U.S. Senate and the Electoral College "undemocratic" and arguing that voting should be made easier and that people with criminal convictions should not lose the right to vote. The conservative Judicial Crisis Network launched a $300,000 television ad campaign against Ho (the group's first TV campaign against a Biden judicial nominee); in response, progressive group Demand Justice launched a six-figure ad campaign in support of Ho. On January 3, 2022, his nomination was returned to the president; he was later renominated the same day. On January 20, 2022, his nomination was deadlocked by an 11–11 vote. On January 3, 2023, his nomination was once again returned to the president and he was renominated later the same day. On February 9, 2023, his nomination was reported out of committee by an 11–10 vote. On June 1, 2023, Majority Leader Chuck Schumer filed a cloture motion on his nomination, but on June 7, 2023, it was withdrawn because of attendance issues. On June 14, 2023, the Senate invoked cloture on his nomination by a 50–49 vote. Senator Joe Manchin was the only Democrat to vote against the motion to invoke cloture and the confirmation of Ho's nomination. Later that same day, his nomination was confirmed by a 50–49 vote. Ho is only the second ACLU lawyer to be confirmed directly to the federal bench as an Article III judge after Ruth Bader Ginsburg.

==== United States District Court for the District of Oregon ====
- Mustafa T. Kasubhai: On September 6, 2023, President Joe Biden announced his intent to nominate Kasubhai to serve as a United States district judge of the United States District Court for the District of Oregon. On September 18, 2023, his nomination was sent to the Senate. President Biden nominated Kasubhai to the seat being vacated by Judge Ann Aiken, who subsequently assumed senior status on December 29, 2023. On October 4, 2023, a hearing on his nomination was held before the Senate Judiciary Committee. During his contentious confirmation hearing, Republican senators sharply questioned him over a ruling that he made in 2020 regarding the George Floyd protests and his statements and writings about diversity, equity, and inclusion. Kasubhai was also questioned on guidance he created for the use of preferred pronouns and honorifics in his courtroom and whether he required them to be stated in his court room, and whether he was a Marxist based on his past writings. On November 2, 2023, Senator John Kennedy accused of Kasubhai of lying in his written responses to questions and charged that he was unqualified to be a federal judge. During the same meeting, the Judiciary Committee unexpectedly held over the nomination until their next business meeting. On November 9, 2023, his nomination was reported out of committee by an 11–10 vote. On November 13, 2023, his nomination was returned to the Judiciary Committee because of issues regarding proxy voting in committee. On November 30, 2023, his nomination was favorably reported out of the Senate Judiciary Committee by an 11–0–8 vote with all committee Republicans in attendance not voting. On January 3, 2024, his nomination was returned to the president under Rule XXXI, Paragraph 6 of the United States Senate and he was renominated on January 8, 2024. On January 18, 2024, his nomination was reported out of committee by an 11–10 party-line vote. On November 19, 2024, the Senate invoked cloture on his nomination by a 51–43 vote. Later that day, his nomination was confirmed by a 51–44 vote.

==== United States District Court for the Western District of Washington ====
- John H. Chun: On September 30, 2021, President Joe Biden announced his intent to nominate Chun to serve as a United States district judge of the United States District Court for the Western District of Washington. President Biden nominated Chun to the seat vacated by Judge James Robart, who assumed senior status on June 28, 2016. Chun was attacked for his stance on Grutter v. Bollinger when he supported the right of universities to practice affirmative action and the utilization of race in regards to admissions and rejections. On November 17, 2021, a hearing on his nomination was held before the Senate Judiciary Committee. On December 16, 2021, his nomination was reported out of committee. On January 3, 2022, his nomination was returned to the president; he was later renominated the same day. On January 20, 2022, his nomination was reported out of committee by a 12–10 vote. On March 16, 2022, the Senate invoked cloture on his nomination by a 50–45 vote. On March 23, 2022, his nomination was confirmed by a 49–47 vote.

=== Failed nominees ===
==== United States District Court for the District of Columbia ====
- Todd E. Edelman: On July 29, 2022, President Joe Biden announced his intent to nominate Edelman to serve as a United States district judge of the United States District Court for the District of Columbia. On September 27, 2022, his nomination was sent to the Senate. President Biden nominated Edelman to the seat vacated by Judge Florence Y. Pan, who was elevated to the United States Court of Appeals for the District of Columbia Circuit. On November 15, 2022, a hearing on his nomination was held before the Senate Judiciary Committee. Republicans attacked Edelman for having released Christian Wingfield with an ankle monitor while he was awaiting trial for illegal possession of a firearm; Wingfield's lawyer had petitioned the court for his release because of the coronavirus pandemic. Shortly after his release, Wingfield was present at a shooting at a Fourth of July cookout during which an 11-year-old boy was killed by a stray bullet fired by another man. On January 3, 2023, Edelman's nomination was returned to the president. He was renominated on January 23, 2023. On February 9, 2023, his nomination was reported out of committee by an 11–10 party-line vote. On January 3, 2024, his nomination was once again returned to the president.

==== United States District Court for the Southern District of California ====
- Marian Gaston: On December 21, 2022, President Joe Biden announced his intent to nominate San Diego County Superior Court Judge Gaston to serve as a United States district judge of the United States District Court for the Southern District of California. On January 23, 2023, her nomination was sent to the Senate. President Biden nominated Gaston to the seat vacated by Judge William Q. Hayes, who assumed senior status on August 1, 2021. A former public defender, Gaston was accused of having a pro-criminal and anti-public safety bias who would reflexively favor criminal defendants. A paper she co-authored in 2007 expressed the opinion that registered sex offenders should not be subject to residency restrictions and should be allowed to live near churches, schools, and day care centers. Senator Alex Padilla and other Democrats accused Gaston's critics of misconstruing Gaston's record. On February 15, 2023, a hearing on her nomination was held before the Senate Judiciary Committee. On May 11, 2023, her nomination was reported out of committee by an 11–10 party-line vote. Her nomination was returned to the president on January 3, 2024, and she asked not to be renominated.

==== United States District Court for the Southern District of Florida ====
- Detra Shaw-Wilder: On March 24, 2024, President Biden announced his intent to nominate Shaw-Wilder to serve as a United States district judge of the United States District Court for the Southern District of Florida. A litigation partner at Kozyak Tropin & Throckmorton in Coral Gables, Shaw-Wilder focused her career on business acquisitions and corporate finance and generated no strong objections. She was recommended by a judicial nominating committee and rated by the American Bar Association as "well qualified", its highest rating. However, the state's two U.S. Senators, Marco Rubio and Rick Scott, refused to consent to her nomination to protest the prosecutions of former President Donald Trump, which they charged was an abuse and politicizing of the legal system. Though the Senators never expressed anything against Shaw-Wilder herself, their objection prevented her nomination from being acted on by the U.S. Senate. On January 3, 2025, her nomination was returned to the president.

==== United States District Court for the District of Kansas ====
- Jabari Wamble: On February 22, 2023, President Biden announced his intent to nominate Wamble to serve as a United States district judge of the United States District Court for the District of Kansas. On February 27, 2023, his nomination was sent to the Senate. Biden nominated Wamble to the seat vacated by Judge Julie A. Robinson, who assumed senior status on January 14, 2022. Senators Jerry Moran and Roger Marshall withheld their support of Wamble's nomination because of a lack of clarity over who would succeed to the seat at the Tenth Circuit. On May 23, 2023, Wamble asked that the Biden administration withdraw his nomination. There were fears that the American Bar Association would rate him "not qualified." The U.S. Attorney's office in Kansas was held in contempt of court for failing to cooperate with an investigation in which prosecutors accessed confidential phone calls between attorneys and clients at Leavenworth Detention Center. Wamble was involved in the case and reportedly offered conflicting statements regarding how he handled one of the recordings, resulting in criticism of Wamble. On May 30, 2023, the White House officially withdrew his nomination.

==== United States District Court for the Northern District of Mississippi ====
- Scott Colom: On November 15, 2022, President Biden nominated Colom to serve as a United States district judge of the United States District Court for the Northern District of Mississippi. Colom received the support from Senator Roger Wicker, but on April 4, 2023, Mississippi's other senator, Cindy Hyde-Smith, announced she would not support it. In a public statement, Hyde-Smith cited Colom's support for letting transgender students participate in girls' and women's sports and cited campaign support from a PAC that received funding from George Soros. On April 10, 2023, he wrote a letter to Senator Hyde-Smith asking her to reconsider her opposition to his nomination. In the letter, Colom stated that he did not request the money from the PAC, did not know the money would be contributed, and did not receive any money from the PAC when he was re-elected in 2019. The letter also stated that he never discussed his policies or any decisions he made as District Attorney with anyone from the PAC or with Soros. The letter also disputed that Colom had ever taken a position on letting transgender students participate in girls' and women's sports; instead, he said he had signed onto a letter with other District Attorneys condemning the criminalization of gender affirming surgery. As of December 2023, his nomination was still stalled despite bipartisan support from Congressman Thompson, Senator Wicker and former governors Phil Bryant and Haley Barbour. On January 3, 2024, his nomination was returned to the president.

==== United States District Court for the Northern District of New York ====
- Jorge Alberto Rodriguez: On July 13, 2022, President Joe Biden nominated Rodriguez to serve as a United States district judge of the United States District Court for the Northern District of New York. President Biden nominated Rodriguez to the seat vacated by Judge David N. Hurd, who would assume senior status upon confirmation of a successor. The day after President Biden nominated Rodriguez of Clifton Park, an Albany-based assistant attorney general, Hurd wrote another letter to President Biden. In the letter, Hurd wrote "Please be advised that I immediately rescind my decision to take senior status as a United States District Judge for the Northern District of New York. I will take senior status if a confirmed successor lives in this area and is permanently assigned to the United States Courthouse in Utica, New York. Otherwise, I shall remain on full-time active status until I retire or die." On August 8, 2022, Kirsten Gillibrand's chief of staff Jess Fassler said "It has always been the expectation that Judge Hurd's successor would sit in the Utica courthouse, and Jorge Rodriguez has committed to doing so." On August 10, 2022, Judge Hurd wrote a letter to Biden to officially rescind his senior status and remain in active service. On January 3, 2023, his nomination was returned to the president. On March 27, 2024, Hurd wrote a new letter to Biden stating that he intended to take senior status upon confirmation of a successor. The news of his decision coincided with an announcement from the Administrative Office of the U.S. Courts that "there is no plan to close the courthouse" in Utica. The seat was ultimately filled by former Congressman Anthony Brindisi, who was confirmed on December 4, 2024.

==== United States District Court for the Southern District of New York ====
- Sarah Netburn: On April 24, 2024, President Joe Biden announced his intent to nominate Magistrate Judge Netburn to serve as a United States district judge of the United States District Court for the Southern District of New York. On April 30, 2024, her nomination was sent to the Senate. President Biden nominated Netburn to the seat being vacated by Judge Lorna G. Schofield, who will assume senior status on December 31, 2024. On May 22, 2024, a hearing on her nomination was held before the Senate Judiciary Committee. During her contentious confirmation hearing, she was questioned by Republican senators on the committee over a 2022 case when she granted the request of July Justine Shelby, an incarcerated transgender woman who asked to move to a women's prison from a men's prison over the objection of the Board of Prisons. Shelby is currently serving a sentence for distributing child pornography to other sex offenders and previously served 18 years in prison for sexual assault of two minors. Republicans were appalled by the ruling and accused Netburn of endangering the other inmates due to ideology. Her nomination is pending before the Senate Judiciary Committee. On July 11, 2024, her nomination was stalled in the Senate Judiciary Committee by a 10–11 vote, with Senator Jon Ossoff voting against. On January 3, 2025, her nomination was returned to the president.

==== United States District Court for the Western District of New York ====
- Colleen Holland: On August 30, 2023, President Joe Biden announced his intent to nominate Holland to serve as a United States district judge of the United States District Court for the Western District of New York. On September 11, 2023, her nomination was sent to the Senate. President Biden nominated Holland, the special counsel to the district's chief judge, to the seat vacated by Judge Frank P. Geraci Jr., who assumed senior status on April 1, 2023. On January 3, 2024, her nomination was returned to the president under Rule XXXI, Paragraph 6 of the United States Senate. On January 9, 2024, Holland decided to withdraw her name from consideration as a federal judge. On July 31, 2024, Meredith Vacca was confirmed to Geraci's seat. On September 23, 2024, the district's judges selected Holland to fill a magistrate judgeship set to open on January 3, 2025.

==== United States District Court for the Eastern District of Washington ====
- Charnelle Bjelkengren: On September 2, 2022, President Joe Biden announced his intent to nominate Spokane County Superior Court Judge Bjelkengren to serve as a United States district judge of the United States District Court for the Eastern District of Washington. On September 19, 2022, his nomination was sent to the Senate. President Biden nominated Bjelkengren to the seat vacated by Judge Salvador Mendoza Jr., who was elevated to the United States Court of Appeals for the Ninth Circuit on September 16, 2022. On January 3, 2023, her nomination was returned to the president. She was renominated on January 23, 2023. On January 25, 2023, a hearing on her nomination was held before the Senate Judiciary Committee. During her confirmation hearing, Bjelkengren could not answer questions from Senator John Kennedy about the functions of Article V and II of the United States Constitution and if she knew what purposivism was. On May 11, 2023, her nomination was reported out of committee by an 11–10 party-line vote. Her nomination was again returned to the president on January 3, 2024. On January 9, 2024, Bjelkengren withdrew her name from consideration as a federal judge. On November 20, 2024, Rebecca L. Pennell was confirmed to Mendoza's seat by a vote of 50 to 48.

==== United States District Court for the Eastern District of Wisconsin ====
- William Pocan: On December 15, 2021, President Joe Biden nominated Pocan to serve as a United States district judge of the United States District Court for the Eastern District of Wisconsin. Biden nominated Pocan to the seat vacated by Judge William C. Griesbach, who assumed senior status on December 31, 2019. On February 15, 2022, U.S. senator Ron Johnson announced he would withhold his blue slip, effectively blocking Pocan from receiving a hearing in the Senate Judiciary Committee, complaining that the Court's Duty Station is in Green Bay while Pocan is from Milwaukee. On January 3, 2023, his nomination was returned to the president. On September 25, 2024, Byron B. Conway was confirmed to the seat.

== Other courts ==
=== Failed nominees ===
==== District of Columbia Court of Appeals ====
- Tovah Renee Calderon is an American attorney who was serving as acting deputy assistant attorney general for the Civil Rights Division at the time of her nomination. She was nominated to serve as a judge of the District of Columbia Court of Appeals in June 2021. On September 14, 2021, a hearing on her nomination was held before the Senate Homeland Security and Governmental Affairs Committee. On October 6, 2021, her nomination was reported out of committee by a 7–6 party-line vote. On January 3, 2022, her nomination was returned to the President under Rule XXXI, Paragraph 6 of the United States Senate; she was renominated the same day. On July 15, 2022, the White House withdrew her nomination at her request.

== See also ==
- List of federal judges appointed by Joe Biden
- Joe Biden Supreme Court candidates
- United States federal judge
- Judicial appointment history for United States federal courts
- Deaths of United States federal judges in active service

== Notes ==
Discharge Votes

Cloture Votes

Confirmation Votes
