= Courts of Washington =

Courts of Washington may refer to:

- Courts of Washington (state)
- Courts of Washington, D.C.

== See also ==
- Court system of Washington (disambiguation)
