= Michael Delaney (lawyer) =

28th Attorney General of New Hampshire

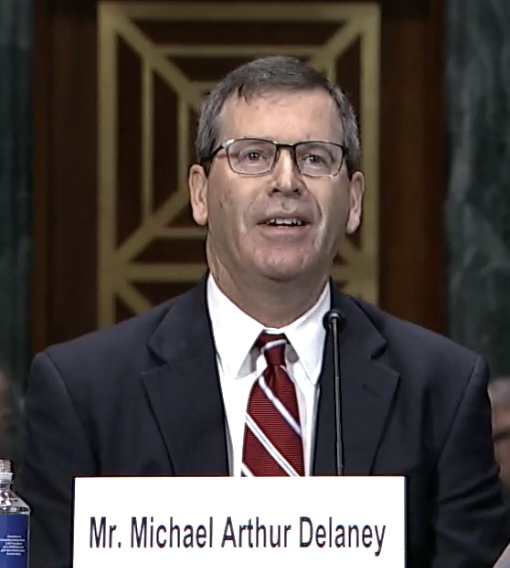

28th Attorney General of New Hampshire
- In office August 24, 2009 – May 15, 2013
- Governor: John Lynch; Maggie Hassan
- Preceded by: Kelly Ayotte
- Succeeded by: Joseph Foster

Legal Counsel to the Governor of New Hampshire
- In office 2006 – August 24, 2009
- Governor: John Lynch
- Preceded by: Katherine Hanna
- Succeeded by: Jeffrey Meyers

Personal details
- Born: Michael Arthur Delaney; July 19, 1969 (age 56) Lynn, Massachusetts, U.S.
- Spouse: Caroline Delaney
- Children: 3
- Education: College of the Holy Cross (BA); Georgetown University (JD)

Michael Arthur Delaney (born July 19, 1969) is an American lawyer and politician who served as the 28th New Hampshire Attorney General from 2009 to 2013. He was appointed attorney general by governor John Lynch.

In 2023, Delaney was nominated by President Joe Biden to serve as a United States circuit judge of the United States Court of Appeals for the First Circuit. On May 18, 2023, it was announced that his nomination would be withdrawn because of bipartisan opposition.

== Early life and education ==
Delaney was born on July 19, 1969, in Lynn, Massachusetts. He grew up as the youngest of five children in an Irish American Catholic family in Danvers, Massachusetts. His father, Arthur Delaney, was a probation officer. He graduated from St John's Preparatory School in 1987.

Delaney graduated from the College of the Holy Cross with a Bachelor of Arts in political science in 1991 and earned his Juris Doctor (J.D.) from the Georgetown University Law Center in 1994.

== Career ==
Delaney joined the law firm of Wiggin & Nourie in Manchester, New Hampshire, in 1994 after graduating from law school; there, he specialized in business litigation.

He joined the New Hampshire Attorney General's office in 1999, initially serving as an assistant attorney general. Delaney then served as the Homicide Unit Chief in the office until 2004, when he became deputy attorney general.

Delaney served as deputy attorney general until 2006, when he left that post to become Governor Lynch's legal counsel. Lynch appointed Delaney New Hampshire Attorney General in 2009 after accepting the resignation of Kelly Ayotte. Delaney was sworn in on August 24, 2009, upon being unanimously confirmed by the Executive Council.

After leaving the attorney general's office, Delaney joined the law firm of McLane Middleton in its Manchester office.

Delaney serves as the Co-Chair of the New Hampshire Campaign for Legal Services Leadership Council.

=== Failed nomination to court of appeals ===
On January 18, 2023, President Joe Biden announced his intent to nominate Delaney to serve as a United States circuit judge of the United States Court of Appeals for the First Circuit. On January 31, 2023, his nomination was sent to the Senate. President Biden nominated him to a seat vacated by Judge Jeffrey R. Howard, who assumed senior status on March 31, 2022. On February 15, 2023, a hearing on his nomination was held before the Senate Judiciary Committee. During the hearing, Delaney received criticism from senators regarding his authoring and filing of a motion seeking to strip a minor female rape victim of anonymity as part of representation of a New Hampshire private school. The allegations were made by the victim of the 2015 assault in a letter to the panel. The victim also wrote an opinion editorial in The Boston Globe saying Delaney "doesn't deserve to be a judge" and that supporting his nomination is equivalent to condoning "what Delaney and St. Paul's School put me and my family through." Owen Labrie was 18 years old at the time he was accused of raping the then 15-year-old student.

Some Democrats expressed concerns about his nomination due to his handling of a sexual assault case. Other Democrats and groups expressed concern over a legal brief that defended a law related to abortion. On May 3, 2023, it was reported that, since 2018, Delaney had been a board member of the New England Legal Foundation, which had opposed some of Biden's positions on climate change, consumer protection, and labor rights.

On May 18, 2023, Delaney asked that his nomination be withdrawn because of bipartisan opposition. On May 30, 2023, the White House officially withdrew his nomination.

== Personal life ==
Delaney has three children with his wife, Caroline.

== See also ==
- Joe Biden judicial appointment controversies

Legal offices
Preceded by Kelly Ayotte	Attorney General of New Hampshire; August 24, 2009 – May 15, 2013	Succeeded by Joseph Foster
