= Courts of Washington (state) =

Courts of Washington include: State courts of Washington

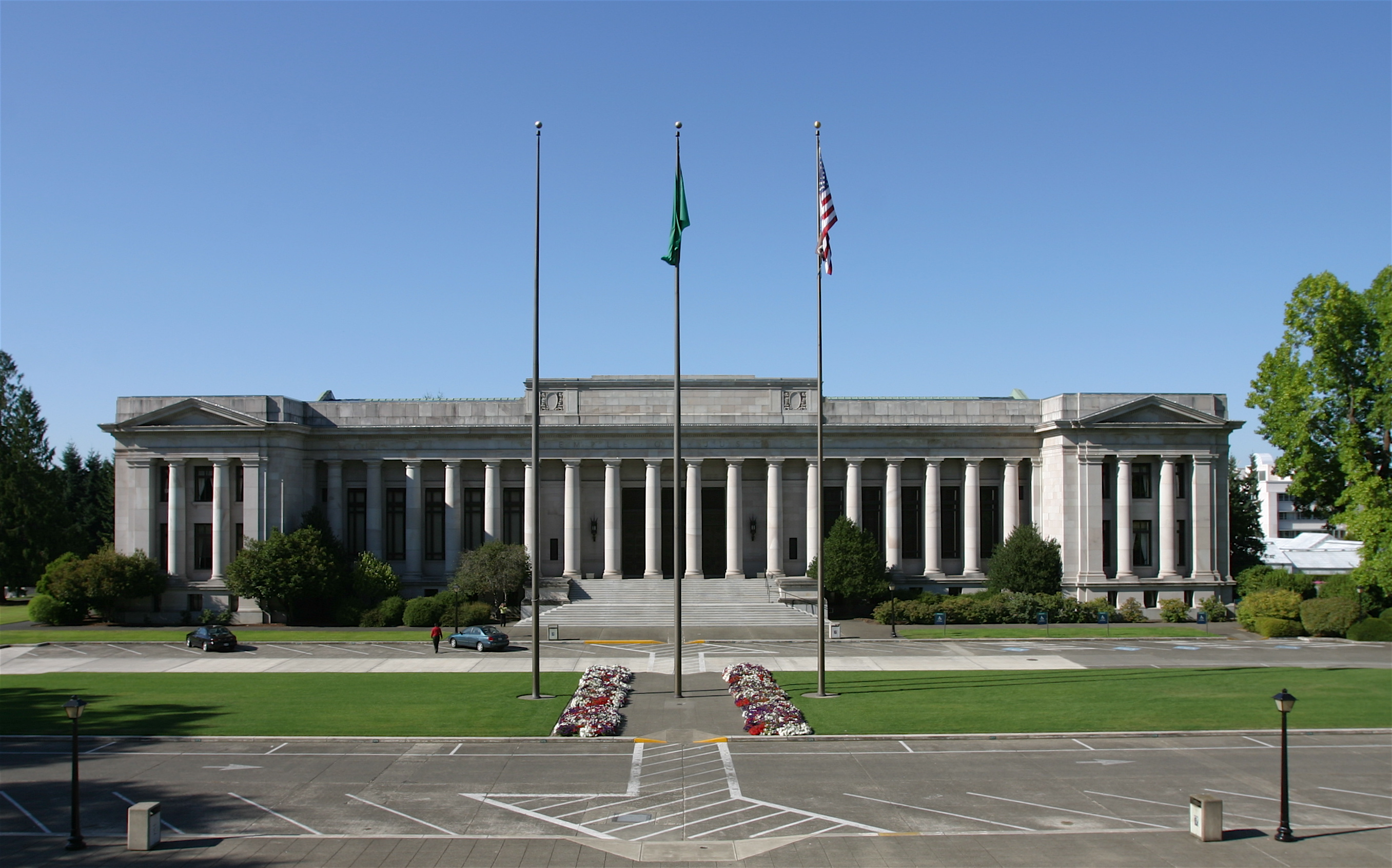
The headquarters of the Washington Supreme Court in Olympia.

- Washington Supreme Court
  - Washington Court of Appeals (3 divisions)
    - Washington Superior Courts (39 courts of general jurisdiction, one for each county)
      - Washington District Courts (Courts of limited jurisdiction)
      - Washington Municipal Courts (Courts of limited jurisdiction)

Federal courts located in Washington

- United States District Court for the Eastern District of Washington
- United States District Court for the Western District of Washington

Former federal courts of Washington

- United States District Court for the District of Washington (extinct, subdivided)

== See also ==
- Washington state court system
- List of county courthouses in Washington
