= Todd E. Edelman =

American judge (born 1968)

Todd Edelman
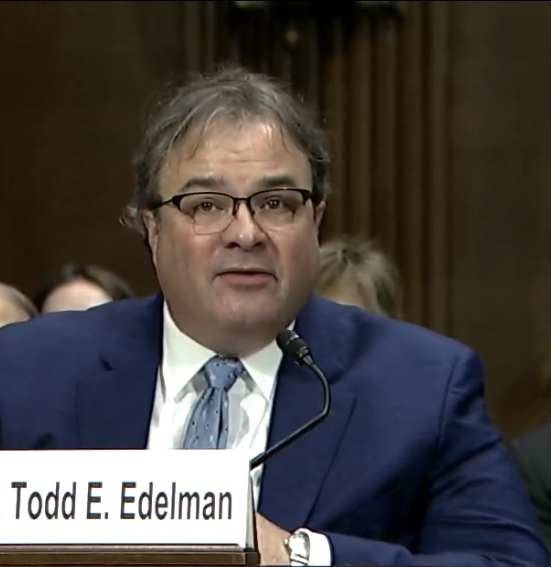

Associate Judge of the Superior Court of the District of Columbia
- Incumbent
- Assumed office 2010
- Appointed by: Barack Obama
- Preceded by: Cheryl M. Long

Personal details
- Born: Todd Eric Edelman; January 16, 1968 (age 58) St. Louis, Missouri, U.S.
- Education: Yale University (BA); New York University (JD)

Todd Eric Edelman (born January 16, 1968) is an American lawyer who has served as an associate judge for the Superior Court of the District of Columbia since 2010. He is a former nominee to be a United States district judge of the United States District Court for the District of Columbia.

== Early life and education ==
Edelman was born in 1968, in St. Louis, Missouri. He received a Bachelor of Arts degree, cum laude, in 1990 from Yale University. He received a Juris Doctor, cum laude, in 1994 from the New York University School of Law where he was a Root-Tilden-Kern Scholar.

== Career ==
Edelman began his legal career as a law clerk to Judge William B. Bryant of the United States District Court for the District of Columbia, from 1994 to 1995. From 1995 to 1997, he was an E. Barrett Prettyman Fellow at Georgetown University Law Center. He worked for the Public Defender Service for the District of Columbia from 1997 to 2005, during which time he served as a staff attorney for the Trial Division from 1997 to 2001, a supervising attorney for the Trial Division from 2001 to 2002, the chief of the Serious Felony Section from 2002 to 2004, and the training director from 2004 to 2005. In recognition of Edelman's public service achievements, Harvard Law School awarded him a Wasserstein Public Interest Fellowship for the 2003–04 academic year. From 2005 to 2008, he was of counsel at the law firm Bredhoff & Kaiser, P.L.L.C. in Washington, D.C. From 2008 to 2010, he was a visiting associate professor of law at the Georgetown University Law Center.

Edelman has served as an associate judge on the Superior Court of the District of Columbia since 2010. As a Superior Court judge, he has presided over cases in the Civil, Criminal, and Domestic Violence Divisions. He served as Presiding Judge of the Superior Court's Civil Division from 2023 to 2024 and as Deputy Presiding Judge from 2021 to 2022. Edelman served on Saving DC's Rental Housing Market Strike Force, an advisory body created by Mayor Muriel Bowser in January 2021 to address challenges facing the District's rental housing market and its post-pandemic future, and, as of 2026, is a member of the District of Columbia Sentencing Commission. On April 23, 2025, the District of Columbia Commission on Judicial Disabilities and Tenure found Edelman well qualified for reappointment, a determination that under D.C. Code § 1-204.33(c) automatically extended his term by fifteen years upon its expiration on June 23, 2025.

Edelman serves on the faculty of the Harvard Law School Trial Advocacy Workshop, and has been an Adjunct Professor of Law at Georgetown Law since 2014, where he received a Charles Fahy Distinguished Adjunct Professor Award among the Law Center's 2021–22 teaching awards.

=== Notable cases ===
In September 2019, Edelman ruled on the admissibility of firearms and toolmark identification evidence in United States v. Marquette Tibbs. Applying the standard for expert testimony that the District of Columbia Court of Appeals had adopted in Motorola, Inc. v. Murray, he held that the government's expert could testify that the recovered firearm could not be excluded as the source of a cartridge casing found at the scene, but barred the expert from stating in stronger terms that the firearm was the source. The ruling was the first in the District to apply Daubert v. Merrell Dow Pharmaceuticals, Inc. and Rule 702 to firearms and toolmark identification testimony, and it drew attention in legal scholarship and the press.

In May 2020, Edelman presided over the trial of Christian Wingfield on charges of illegal possession of a firearm by a felon. Wingfield's lawyer petitioned the court for his release from pre-trial custody because of the coronavirus pandemic then affecting jails. Edelman granted the request and released Wingfield with an ankle monitor instead of keeping him in jail until the trial. Shortly after his release, Wingfield was present at a shooting at a Fourth of July cookout during which an 11-year-old boy was killed by a stray bullet. Wingfield was part of a group the police initially arrested and charged with murder, but later analysis indicated that he had not fired a gun that night. Wingfield pled guilty to a charge of voluntary manslaughter and was sentenced to 9.5 years in prison.

In 2024, Edelman presided over an antitrust suit brought by the District of Columbia Attorney General against RealPage and fourteen of the District's largest landlords, alleging that they used RealPage's revenue-management software to fix apartment rents in violation of the D.C. Antitrust Act. In an opinion issued on July 2, 2024, Edelman explained his earlier denial of motions to dismiss filed by JBG Smith and Highmark Residential, holding that the District had plausibly alleged that JBG had entered a conspiracy with competitors to fix rents.

In 2025, Edelman presided over a multi-week jury trial in United States v. James Walker, a prosecution arising from an August 2019 fire in an illegal rooming house owned by Walker at 708 Kennedy Street NW, in which two tenants died: Fitsum Kebede, 40, and Yafet Solomen, 10. The case was tried jointly by the U.S. Attorney's Office for the District of Columbia, which charged Walker with second-degree murder, and the D.C. Office of the Attorney General, which charged him with criminal building code violations. On February 20, 2025, the jury convicted Walker, 67, on two counts of second-degree murder and 27 criminal building code violations. Edelman sentenced him on May 2, 2025 to more than 35 years in prison followed by five years of supervised release.

In July 2025, Edelman presided over the trial of Darran Joyner, whom a Superior Court jury convicted on seven felony counts, including multiple counts of first- and second-degree child sexual abuse. In January 2026, Edelman sentenced Joyner to 32 years in prison, followed by 10 years of supervision.

In May 2026, Edelman presided over the trial of Robert Lowe, whom a Superior Court jury convicted of second-degree murder while armed, possession of a firearm during a crime of violence, and unlawful possession of a firearm, in the April 2024 shooting of Kenneth Goins at a bar on U Street NW. On August 14, 2026, Edelman sentenced Lowe to 21 years in prison, followed by five years of supervised release.

=== Expired nomination to the U.S. district court ===
On April 28, 2016, President Barack Obama nominated Edelman to serve as a United States district judge of the United States District Court for the District of Columbia, to the seat vacated by Judge Richard W. Roberts, who assumed senior status on March 16, 2016. His nomination expired on January 3, 2017, with the end of the 114th Congress.

=== Renomination to U.S. district court under Biden ===
On July 29, 2022, President Joe Biden announced his intent to nominate Edelman to serve as a United States district judge of the United States District Court for the District of Columbia. On September 27, 2022, his nomination was sent to the Senate. President Biden nominated Edelman to the seat vacated by Judge Florence Y. Pan, who was elevated to the United States Court of Appeals for the District of Columbia Circuit. The American Bar Association's Standing Committee on the Federal Judiciary unanimously rated Edelman "Well Qualified" for the appointment, with one member recused. On November 15, 2022, a hearing on his nomination was held before the Senate Judiciary Committee.

Republicans criticized Edelman for his handling of the Christian Wingfield case, linking Wingfield's release to the later killing of an 11-year-old boy, though Wingfield was later found not to have fired a weapon. On January 3, 2023, Edelman's nomination was returned to the president at the end of the 117th Congress. He was renominated by President Biden on January 23, 2023. On February 9, 2023, his nomination was reported out of committee by an 11–10 party-line vote. On January 3, 2024, his nomination was again returned to the president. In a subsequent column, The Washington Post columnist Dana Milbank criticized Republicans for pushing a distorted narrative about the facts of the Wingfield case and Democrats for not defending Edelman, writing that "few have been so abused by the Senate's broken judicial confirmation process as Edelman."

== See also ==
- Joe Biden judicial appointment controversies
