= Sarah Russell =

Sarah Russell may refer to:

- Sarah Rachel Russell (died 1880), cosmetician and blackmailer
- Sarah Amanda Sanders Russell (1844–1913), American political hostess, temperance activist, and farmer
- Sarah Russell, pseudonym of Marghanita Laski
- Sarah Elizabeth Russell, daughter of John Russell, 4th Earl Russell
- Sarah Russell (politician), MP for Congleton
- Sarah F. Russell (born 1976), American lawyer, academic and United States district judge

== See also ==
- Sara Russell (born 1966), British planetary scientist
