= Charnelle Bjelkengren =

American judge (born 1975)

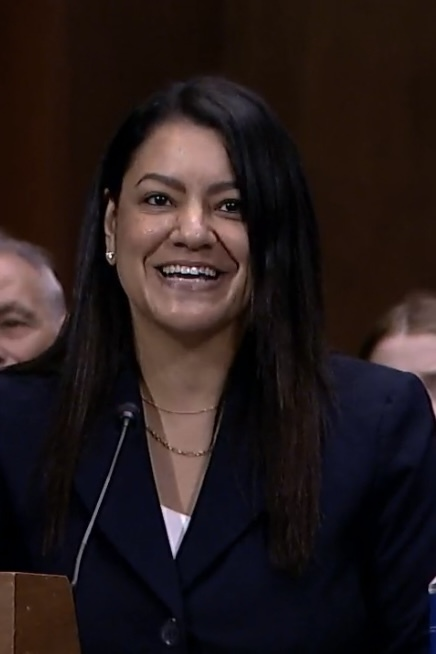
- Bjelkengren in 2023

Judge of Spokane County Superior Court
- Incumbent
- Assumed office April 10, 2019
- Appointed by: Jay Inslee
- Preceded by: James Triplet

Personal details
- Pronunciation: BELL-ken-gren
- Born: Charnelle Marie Bjelkengren; 1975 (age 50–51) Great Lakes, Illinois, U.S.
- Education: Minnesota State University, Mankato (BA); Gonzaga University (JD)

Charnelle Marie Bjelkengren (born 1975) is an American lawyer who has served as a judge of the Spokane County Superior Court since 2019. She is a former nominee to serve as a United States district judge of the United States District Court for the Eastern District of Washington.

== Education ==
Bjelkengren received a Bachelor of Arts from Mankato State University (now Minnesota State University), cum laude, in 1997 and a Juris Doctor from Gonzaga University School of Law in 2000.

== Career ==
From 2001 to 2003 and from 2004 to 2013, Bjelkengren served as an assistant attorney general in the Washington State Attorney General's office. From 2013 to 2019, she served as an administrative law judge for Washington State's Office of Administrative Hearings. Since 2019, she has served as a judge on the Spokane County Superior Court.

=== Nomination to district court ===
On September 2, 2022, President Joe Biden nominated Bjelkengren to serve as a United States district judge of the United States District Court for the Eastern District of Washington on the seat vacated by Judge Salvador Mendoza Jr., who was elevated to the United States Court of Appeals for the Ninth Circuit on September 16, 2022. Bjelkengren was recommended to Biden by senator Patty Murray. On September 19, 2022, her nomination was sent to the Senate. On January 3, 2023, her nomination was returned to the president under Rule XXXI, Paragraph 6 of the United States Senate. She was renominated on January 23, 2023.

On January 25, 2023, a hearing on her nomination was held before the Senate Judiciary Committee. During her confirmation hearing, Bjelkengren could not answer questions from Senator John Kennedy about the United States Constitution, including the functions of Article II and Article V and the meaning of purposivism. Bjelkengren was subsequently sharply criticized by other Senate Republicans, with Senate Minority Leader Mitch McConnell noting that Bjelkengren had a lack of experience in the federal court system and could only name six cases when asked for her top ten list of the most impactful cases she had ever litigated in court. Bjelkengren received a "Qualified" rating from the American Bar Association. On May 11, 2023, her nomination was reported out of committee by a party-line 11–10 vote. Her nomination was again returned to the president on January 3, 2024. On January 9, 2024, Bjelkengren withdrew her name from consideration as a federal judge.

== See also ==
- Joe Biden judicial appointment controversies
