= Court system of Washington =

Court system of Washington or Judiciary of Washington may refer to:

- Court system of Washington (state)
- Court system of Washington, D.C.

== See also ==
- Courts of Washington (disambiguation)
