= Gary Lambert (politician) =

American politician

Member of the New Hampshire Senate from the 13th district
- In office 2010–2012
- Preceded by: Bette Lasky
- Succeeded by: Bette Lasky

Personal details
- Born: October 27, 1959 (age 66) Providence, Rhode Island, U.S.
- Party: Republican
- Education: Valparaiso University, Valparaiso, Indiana; Drake University School of Law, Des Moines, Iowa; US Army War College, Carlisle, Pennsylvania
- Occupation: Registered patent attorney
- Awards: Parachutist Badge; Legion of Merit; Bronze Star Medal; Global War on Terrorism Expeditionary Medal; Iraq Campaign Medal; Global War on Terrorism Service Medal
- Website: lambertpatentlaw.com

Military service
- Allegiance: United States
- Branch/service: U.S. Marine Corps
- Years of service: 1979–2014
- Rank: Colonel
- Battles/wars: Iraq War

Gary Lambert (born 1959) is an American politician from the state of New Hampshire. A Republican from Nashua, he served in the New Hampshire Senate for the 13th district and ran for the Republican nomination for the United States House of Representatives in New Hampshire's 2nd congressional district in New Hampshire's 2014 congressional elections. He competed with Marilinda Garcia and Jim Lawrence in the Republican primary for the chance to challenge incumbent Democrat Ann McLane Kuster in the general election.

== Political career ==
Lambert was elected to the New Hampshire Senate in 2010, defeating Bette Lasky. He did not seek reelection in 2012. He instead sought his party's nomination as its candidate for New Hampshire's 2nd congressional district for the 2014 congressional election.

Lambert criticized his major opponent in the GOP primary, Marilinda Garcia, a then former one term member of the New Hampshire House of Representatives, asserting that Garcia supports "$150 billion in new taxes." The Nashua Telegraph's Politifact Truth-o-Meter rated Lambert's claim in its opinion as a "Pants on Fire" lie, as Garcia has indicated that she does not support increasing the overall tax burden. Politifact New Hampshire's Truth-o-Meter has also rated a past campaign statement of Garcia's in its opinion as "mostly false".

A television ad released by Lambert's campaign was criticized by former New Hampshire Speaker of the House of Representatives William L. O'Brien. In O'Brien's opinion the ad was "slightly misogynous" and exploitative of Garcia's Hispanic background. O'Brien, who had just recently lost his position as Speaker of the 400 member New Hampshire House of Representatives, had earlier himself planned to run in the 2014 election for the same congressional seat. The ad claimed that Garcia supports amnesty, a claim that the New Hampshire Union Leader wrote in its opinion was untrue and misrepresented Garcia's positions.

== Military service ==
Lambert was a colonel in the United States Marine Corps Reserve. He served with the Corps for 35 years, before retiring from the military in 2014. He served actively as a commissioned officer of the Judge Advocates Division from 1985–1987. During this period, his command was awarded the Navy Unit Commendation. Lambert was recalled to active duty for the Iraq War. He was awarded the Bronze Star Medal for his service during the conflict. The Colonel has also been awarded the Legion of Merit, the Global War on Terrorism Expeditionary Medal, the Iraq Campaign Medal, the Global War on Terrorism Service Medal and a Parachutist Badge.

== Education, occupation and family ==
Lambert, who received a BS with a double major in chemistry and biology from Valparaiso University and a JD (Honors) from Drake University, is in private practice as a registered patent attorney. He is a member of the Massachusetts, New Hampshire, and Iowa Bars. The Colonel also received an MS in strategic studies from the US Army War College. Gary Lambert and his wife of 20 years plus, Lori, have 2 daughters, Katherine and Grace.

Government offices
Preceded by Bette Lasky	New Hampshire State Senator, District 13; 2010–2012	Succeeded by Bette Lasky
