= Seth Aframe =

American judge (born 1974)

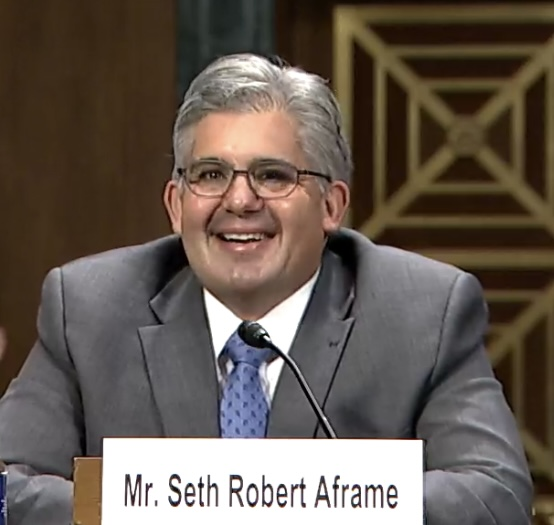

Judge of the United States Court of Appeals for the First Circuit
- Incumbent
- Assumed office May 23, 2024
- Appointed by: Joe Biden
- Preceded by: Jeffrey R. Howard

Personal details
- Born: Seth Robert Aframe; 1974 (age 51–52) Boston, Massachusetts, U.S.
- Education: Tufts University (BA); Georgetown University (JD)

Seth Robert Aframe (born 1974) is an American lawyer from New Hampshire who has served as a United States circuit judge of the United States Court of Appeals for the First Circuit since 2024.

== Education ==
Aframe received a Bachelor of Arts, summa cum laude, from Tufts University in 1996 and a Juris Doctor, magna cum laude, from Georgetown University Law Center in 1999.

== Career ==
From 1999 to 2000, he served as a law clerk to Justice Judith Cowin on the Massachusetts Supreme Judicial Court. From 2000 to 2003, Aframe was an associate at Choate, Hall & Stewart in Boston. From 2003 to 2007, he served as a law clerk for Judge Jeffrey R. Howard on the United States Court of Appeals for the First Circuit. From 2007 to 2024, he was an assistant United States attorney in the United States Attorney's Office for the District of New Hampshire, where he served as chief of the appellate division from 2010 to 2024 and chief of the criminal division from 2023 to 2024.

In 2018, Aframe was named an elections and civil rights coordinator in the United States Attorney's Office.

Since 2008, Aframe has taught First Amendment law at the University of New Hampshire School of Law and legal writing at Boston University.

=== Federal judicial service ===
On October 4, 2023, President Joe Biden nominated Aframe to serve as a United States circuit judge of the United States Court of Appeals for the First Circuit. President Biden nominated Aframe to the seat vacated by Judge Jeffrey R. Howard, who assumed senior status on March 31, 2022. On November 1, 2023, a hearing on his nomination was held before the Senate Judiciary Committee. During his confirmation hearing, Republican senators sought to paint Aframe as being soft on crime, pointing to a 2020 case he tried in which he recommended a 30-year sentence for a man convicted of sexually assaulting a minor. On November 30, 2023, his nomination was favorably reported out of committee by an 11–10 party line vote. On January 3, 2024, his nomination was returned to the president under Rule XXXI, Paragraph 6 of the United States Senate and he was renominated on January 8, 2024. On January 18, 2024, his nomination was reported out of committee by an 11–10 party-line vote. On May 16, 2024, the Senate invoked cloture on his nomination by a 52–43 vote. On May 20, 2024, his nomination was confirmed by a 49–40 vote. He received his judicial commission on May 23, 2024.

== See also ==
- Joe Biden judicial appointment controversies

Legal offices
Preceded by Jeffrey R. Howard	Judge of the United States Court of Appeals for the First Circuit; 2024–present	Incumbent
