= Joseph Foster (politician) =

29th Attorney General of New Hampshire

Joe Foster

29th Attorney General of New Hampshire
- In office May 15, 2013 – March 31, 2017
- Governor: Maggie Hassan; Chris Sununu
- Preceded by: Mike Delaney
- Succeeded by: Gordon J. MacDonald

Member of the New Hampshire Senate from the 13th district
- In office December 4, 2002 – December 3, 2008
- Preceded by: Debora Pignatelli
- Succeeded by: Bette Lasky

Member of the New Hampshire House of Representatives
- In office 1994–1998

Personal details
- Born: June 10, 1959 (age 67) Poughkeepsie, New York, U.S.
- Party: Democratic
- Spouse: Marissa Baltus
- Education: Tufts University (BA); George Washington University (JD)

Joseph A. Foster (born June 10, 1959) is an American politician who served as the 29th Attorney General of New Hampshire from 2013 to 2017. He was formerly a Democratic member of the New Hampshire Senate, representing the 13th district from 2002 until 2008 and served as the State Senate Majority Leader in 2007 and 2008. Previously he was a member of the New Hampshire House of Representatives from 1994 through 1998. On April 17, 2013, he was confirmed to the office of New Hampshire Attorney General. He took office on May 15, 2013, succeeding Michael A. Delaney who decided not to seek reappointment by Governor Maggie Hassan at the end of his term, and instead took Foster's old position at his law firm. In 2013, Foster was described as a potential Congressional candidate.

Legal offices
Preceded by Mike Delaney	Attorney General of New Hampshire; 2013–2017	Succeeded by Gordon MacDonald
