= Adeel A. Mangi =

Pakistani-American lawyer (born 1977)

Adeel Mangi
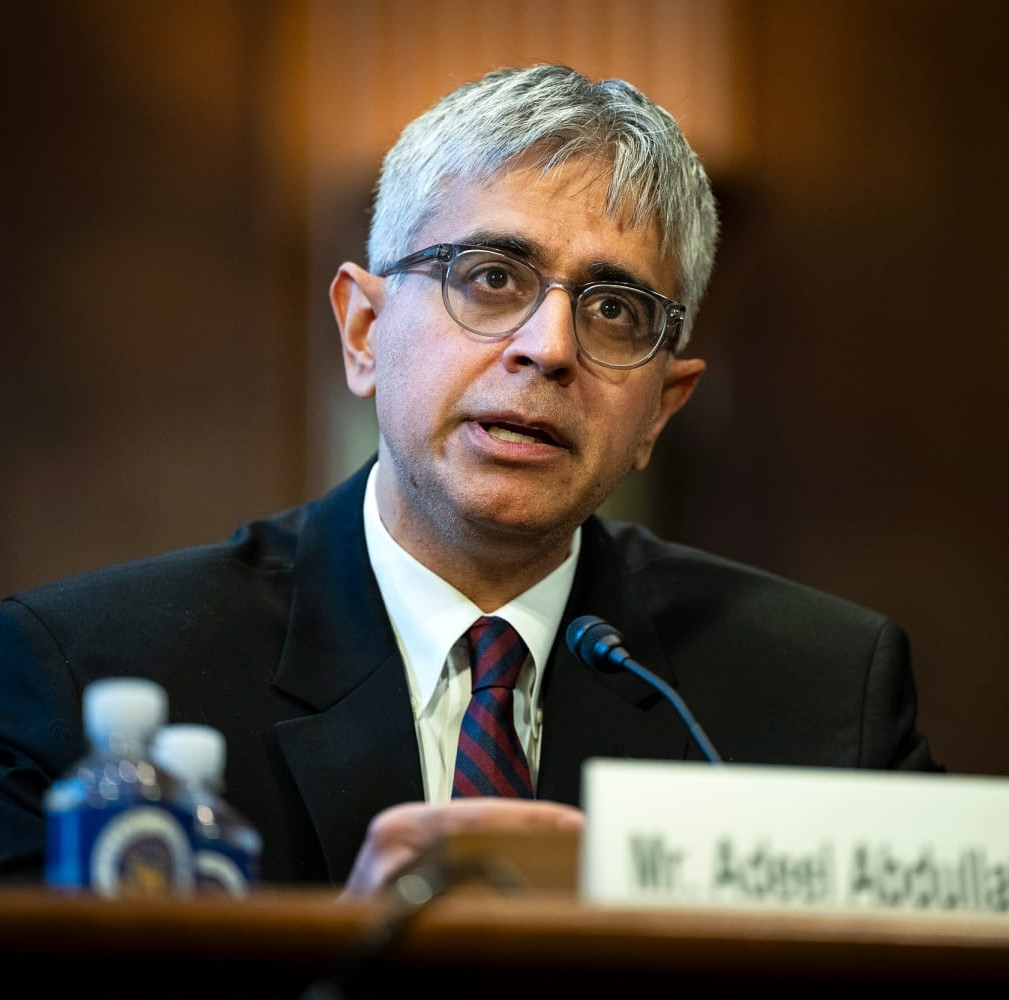
- Mangi appearing before the Senate Judiciary Committee in 2024

Personal details
- Born: Adeel Abdullah Mangi; 1977 (age 48–49) Karachi, Sindh, Pakistan
- Children: 2
- Education: Pembroke College, Oxford (BA); City Law School (PGDip); Harvard University (LLM)

Adeel Abdullah Mangi (born 1977) is a Pakistani-American lawyer who was nominated to serve as a United States circuit judge of the United States Court of Appeals for the Third Circuit by President Joe Biden in November 2023. Had he been confirmed, Mangi would have been the first Muslim American to serve on a federal appeals court and the third Muslim-American federal judge overall. His nomination was withdrawn due to opposition in the United States Senate.

== Personal life ==
Mangi is an ethnic Sindhi born in Karachi, Sindh. In addition to English, Mangi speaks Sindhi, Urdu, and Hindi. He lives in Northern New Jersey with his wife and two children.

== Education ==
Mangi received a First Class degree in law from the University of Oxford, Pembroke College in 1998. While at Pembroke, Mangi was awarded the Roger Bannister Scholarship for Academics and Sports and Domus scholarships. He received a postgraduate diploma in Professional Legal Skills from the City University London Inns of Court School of Law in 1999 and a Master of Laws (LL.M) from Harvard Law School in 2000.

== Career ==
Mangi began his career as an associate at Patterson Belknap Webb & Tyler in New York City in 2000, becoming counsel in 2009; he was elevated to partner in 2010. At the time of his election, he was the youngest associate to be elected partner at Patterson Belknap Webb & Tyler.

Mangi has litigated a number of religious discrimination cases, including winning permits for two mosques after local New Jersey governments in Bayonne and Bernards Township refused to issue construction permits for mosques. The case against Bernards was settled for $3.25 million and a permit. The case against Bayonne settled for $400,000 and a permit.

In a 2020 lawsuit that Mangi litigated, the state of New York agreed to install cameras and microphones at Sullivan Correctional Facility after a mentally ill black inmate there died after being beaten by white corrections officers.

Mangi has also served on the advisory boards of the Alliance of Families for Justice, the Muslim Bar Association of New York, and the Ali Hasan Mangi Memorial Trust. He was named a top 100 trial lawyer by Benchmark Litigation in 2024.

=== Nomination to court of appeals ===
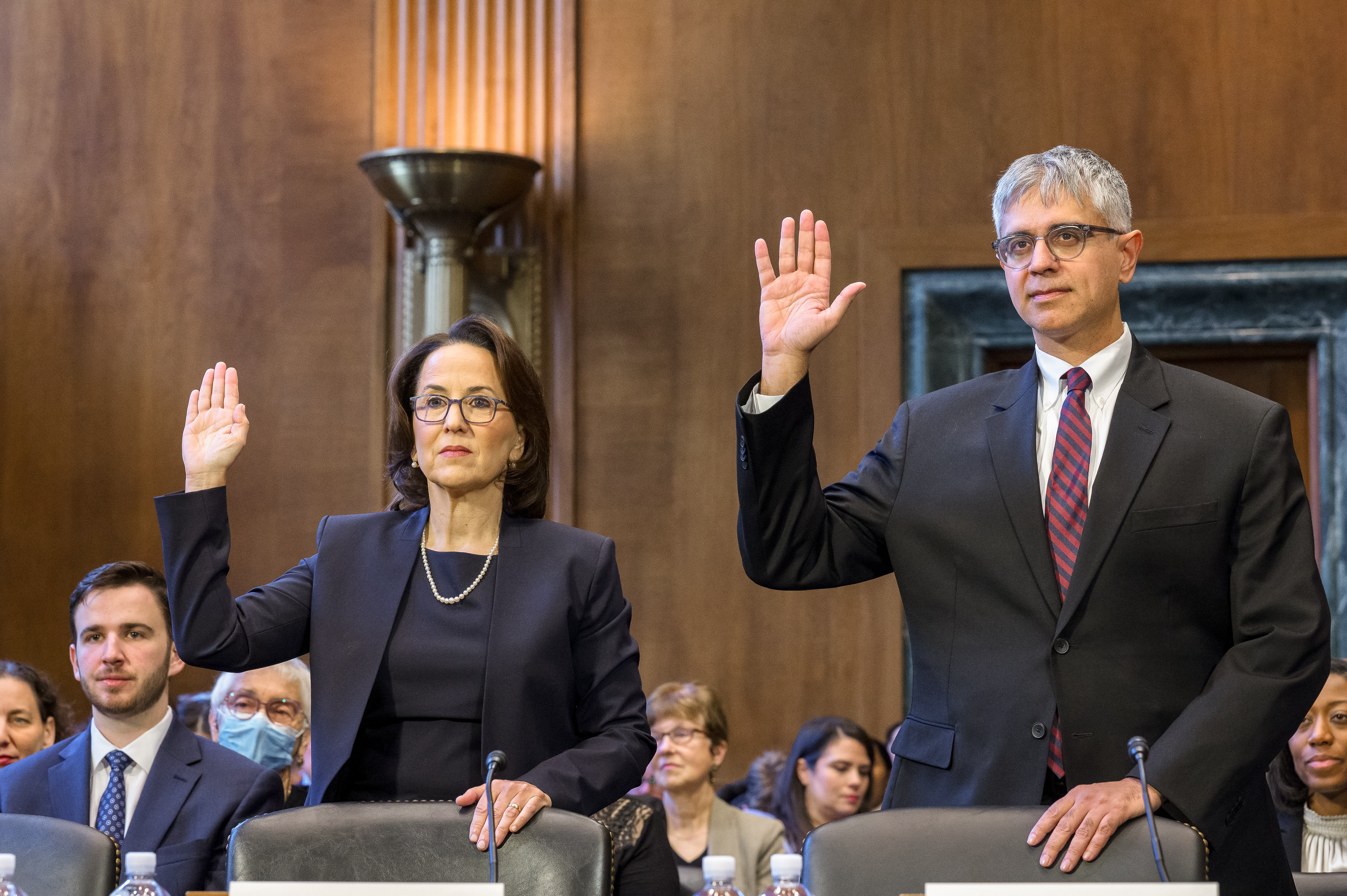
Mangi (right) at his Senate Judiciary Hearing alongside fellow nominee Nicole Berner

Following the vacancy left by retiring judge Joseph A. Greenaway Jr. in June 2023, President Joe Biden announced his intent to nominate Mangi to serve as a United States circuit judge of the United States Court of Appeals for the Third Circuit on November 15, 2023. Mangi's nomination was received by the U.S. Senate and referred to the Senate Judiciary committee on November 27, 2023. Advocacy groups including the Leadership Conference on Civil and Human Rights, National LGBTQ+ Bar Association, and the National Council of Jewish Women submitted letters in support of Mangi's confirmation.

On December 13, 2023, Mangi testified before the Senate Judiciary Committee during a hearing on pending judicial nominations. During this hearing, Mangi was questioned by senators not only on his past pro bono work and his years of service on the Advisory Board of Rutgers University's Center for Security, Race and Rights, but also on his application of the law. Mangi was repeatedly questioned on his involvement in organizations supporting Muslim communities and whether he condemned terrorism. In response, Mangi said that he would "unequivocally" condemn terrorist attacks, including the October 7 Hamas-led attacks on Israel, but that it would not be appropriate for him to take policy stances beyond that.

In pursuance of U.S. Senate Rule XXXI, Paragraph 6, Mangi's nomination was returned to the President on January 3, 2024, and he was renominated on January 8, 2024. On January 18, 2024, his nomination was favorably reported out of committee by an 11–10 party-line vote. A month later, the Washington Examiner reported that in his Senate Judiciary Questionnaire Mangi had failed to include that he moderated a panel at the National Association of Muslim Lawyers annual conference in 2022. Mangi apologized to the Senate in writing for the "inadvertent omission" of the event from his questionnaire. Democratic senators Catherine Cortez-Masto, Joe Manchin and Jacky Rosen soon announced their opposition to his nomination.

In April 2024, in response to what they asserted was an Islamophobic reaction to Mangi's nomination, more than 100 public policy, labor and advocacy organizations, including the American Federation of Labor, the Center for American Progress, and the NAACP, collectively wrote a letter to the Senate asking members to confirm Mangi. New Jersey Attorney General Matthew Platkin wrote an op-ed, and Senator Cory Booker spoke on the Senate floor in support of Mangi's nomination, alleging that anti-Muslim bias was contributing to opposition to his appointment. Journalist Lydia Polgreen authored an op-ed in The New York Times entitled "The Islamophobic Smear Campaign Dividing Democrats."

In May 2024, the White House continued to back Mangi's nomination, "despite the path to confirmation being unclear and the vast opposition" his nomination has faced. In May 2024, journalist Jonathan Blitzer in The New Yorker reported on what he described as "the smearing" of Mangi as a Muslim candidate. The Star Ledger in New Jersey wrote five editorials urging Mangi’s confirmation.

The American Jewish Committee endorsed Mangi in a statement and called him an “able jurist”. A Republican-appointed former Judge of the Third Circuit, Timothy K. Lewis, also wrote to Senators and spoke out to condemn the attacks on Mangi and urge his confirmation. Talk show host John Oliver devoted a segment to the attacks on Mangi as part of an exploration of Islamophobia in America where he described the attacks as “yet more Six degrees of separation nonsense.”

On May 17, dozens of major law firm partners and counsel working on pro bono issues wrote a letter to Senate leaders decrying what they identified as a smear campaign against Mangi that, if successful at derailing the nomination, would tend to deter pro bono involvement by would-be federal judicial candidates.

On November 21, 2024, Senator Chuck Schumer announced that he had made a deal with Senate Republicans to withhold floor votes on Mangi and three other Biden appellate nominees in exchange for permitting several district court judges' nominations to go forward to floor votes. In a letter to President Biden dated December 16, 2024, Mangi wrote that the Judicial Confirmation process in the United States is "fundamentally broken" and emphasized the risk nominees–particularly minorities–are exposed to in the confirmation process. Mangi reiterated how attacks against him had not sought to engage in questioning of his qualifications, but rather sought to perpetuate Islamophobic rhetoric and raise money for committee members' political campaigns through "performative McCarthyism."

In July 2025, the Senate confirmed Emil Bove to fill the vacancy.

== See also ==
- Joe Biden judicial appointment controversies
