= Mustafa T. Kasubhai =

American judge (born 1970)

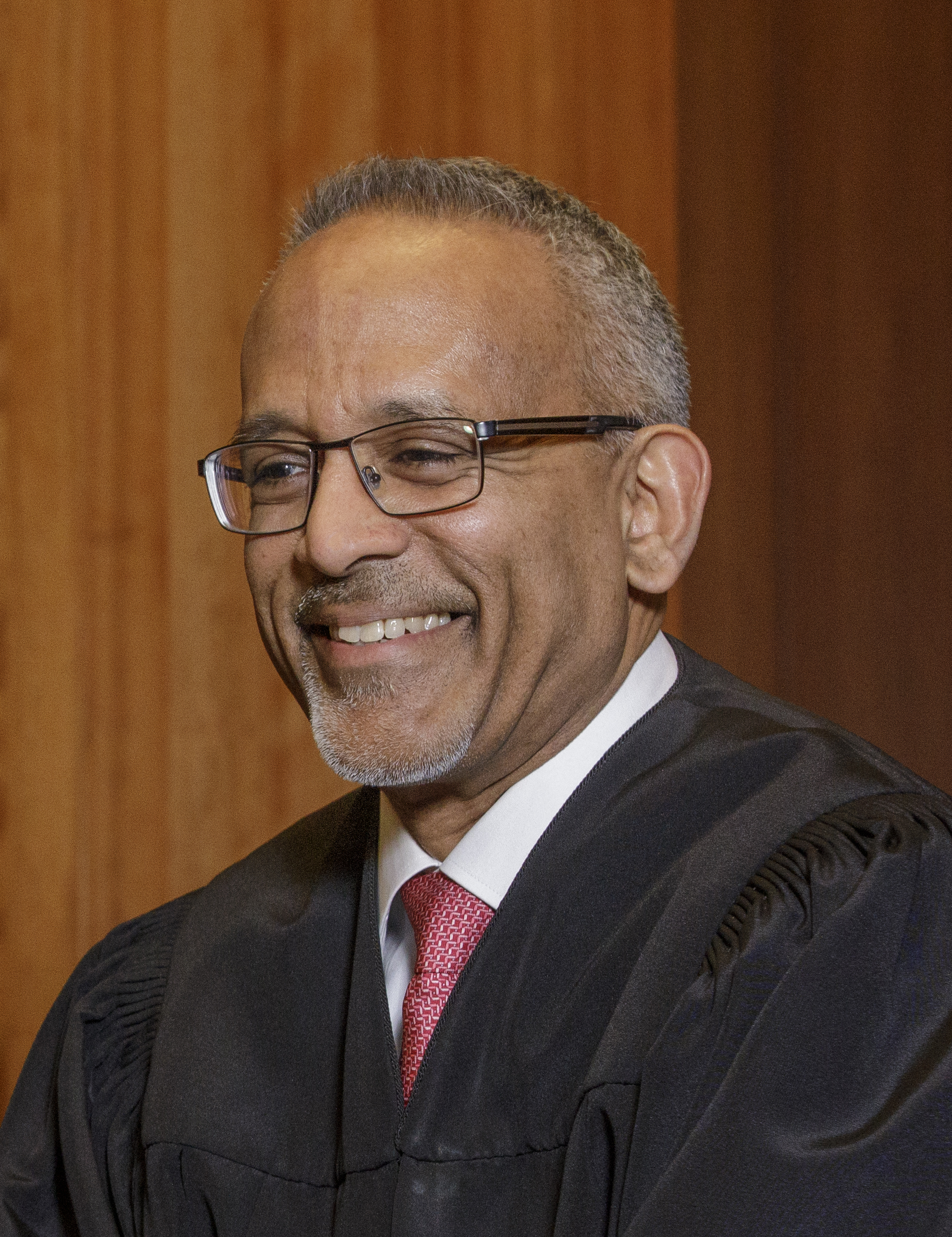

Judge of the United States District Court for the District of Oregon
- Incumbent
- Assumed office November 22, 2024
- Appointed by: Joe Biden
- Preceded by: Ann Aiken

Magistrate Judge of the United States District Court for the District of Oregon
- In office September 21, 2018 – November 22, 2024
- Preceded by: Jolie A. Russo

Judge for the Lane County Circuit Court
- In office 2007–2018
- Appointed by: Ted Kulongoski

Personal details
- Born: 1970 (age 55–56) Reseda, Los Angeles, California, U.S.
- Education: University of California, Berkeley (BS); University of Oregon (JD)
- Website: District Court Webpage

Mustafa Taher Kasubhai (born 1970) is an American lawyer who has served as a United States district judge of the United States District Court for the District of Oregon since 2024. He previously served as a United States magistrate judge of the same court from 2018 to 2024 as well as a judge on the Lane County Circuit Court from 2007 to 2018. He is the first Muslim to serve as a federal judge in the United States. (Note: Kasubhai became the first Muslim to serve as a federal judge following his appointment as a Magistrate Judge for the District of Oregon. Kasubhai was not the first Muslim Article III judge however, as Zahid Quraishi was confirmed to the District of New Jersey prior to Kasubhai's respective confirmation to the District of Oregon)

== Early life and career ==
Kasubhai was born in the Los Angeles suburb of Reseda in the San Fernando Valley in 1970, and grew up in the Los Angeles suburb of Canoga Park. His parents were Gujarati Dawoodi Bohra Indian immigrants, having moved to the United States from Mumbai in the 1960s.

Kasubhai graduated from the University of California, Berkeley in 1992 with a degree in business administration. He completed his Juris Doctor degree at the University of Oregon School of Law in 1996.

Kasubhai began his private legal career in a small civil plaintiff's firm until he opened his own practice, the Law Offices of Mustafa T. Kasubhai. He worked primarily between Klamath Falls and Eugene, Oregon, representing workers and unions in workers compensation cases and plaintiffs in civil cases primarily involving torts and work-related injuries.

In 2003, Oregon Governor Ted Kulongoski nominated Kasubhai to serve on the Oregon Workers' Compensation Board as one of its labor members in Salem, Oregon. He remained there until joining the state bench in 2007.

== Judicial career ==
Governor Kulongoski appointed Kasubhai as a judge on the Lane County Circuit Court in 2007. He was re-elected to another six-year term in 2014.

Kasubhai is the first South Asian-American and Muslim judge to be appointed to the Lane County Circuit Court. Following his appointment as a magistrate judge for the District of Oregon in 2018, he became the first Muslim-American to serve as a federal judge in the United States.

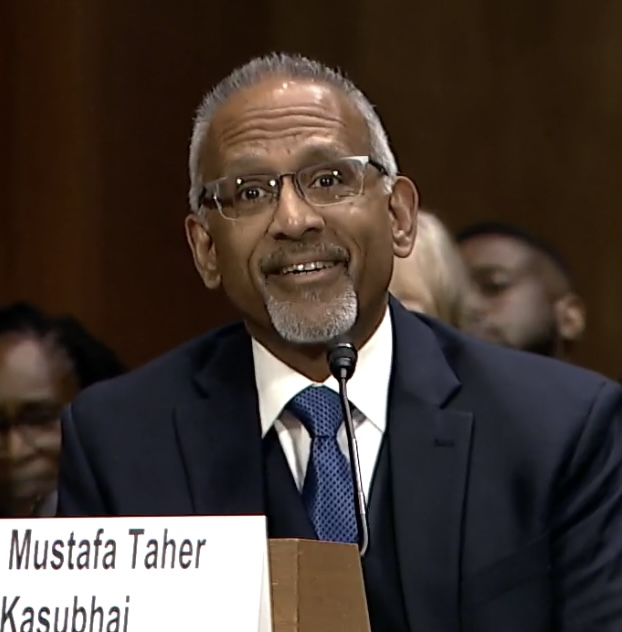
Mustafa T. Kasubhai U.S. Senate Judiciary Committee hearing - October 4, 2023

=== Federal judicial service ===
On June 1, 2023, Kasubhai was one of six names U.S. senators Ron Wyden and Jeff Merkley submitted to the White House for a vacancy on the United States District Court for the District of Oregon created by Marco A. Hernandez, who subsequently assumed senior status on August 21, 2024.

On September 6, 2023, President Joe Biden announced his intent to nominate Kasubhai to serve as a United States district judge of the United States District Court for the District of Oregon. On September 18, 2023, his nomination was sent to the Senate. President Biden nominated Kasubhai to the seat being vacated by Judge Ann Aiken, who subsequently assumed senior status on December 29, 2023. On October 4, 2023, a hearing on his nomination was held before the Senate Judiciary Committee. During his confirmation hearing, Republican senators questioned him over a ruling that he made in 2020 regarding the George Floyd protests and his statements and writings about diversity, equity, and inclusion. Kasubhai was also questioned on guidance he created for the use of preferred pronouns and honorifics in his courtroom, and whether he was a Marxist based on his past writings. On November 9, 2023, his nomination was favorably reported out of committee by a party-line 11–10 vote. On November 13, 2023, his nomination was returned to the Judiciary Committee because of issues regarding proxy voting in committee. On November 30, 2023, his nomination was reported out committee by an 11–0–8 vote with all committee Republicans in attendance not voting. On January 3, 2024, his nomination was returned to the president under Rule XXXI, Paragraph 6 of the United States Senate and he was renominated on January 8, 2024. On January 18, 2024, his nomination was reported out of committee by an 11–10 party-line vote. In June 2024, a cloture vote to advance Kasubhai's nomination was set to take place in the U.S. Senate. Majority Leader Chuck Schumer cancelled the planned vote, citing attendance issues. According to Bloomberg Law, "Kasubhai has faced intense opposition from GOP lawmakers who've said that he's too radical for the federal bench." On November 19, 2024, the Senate invoked cloture on his nomination by a 51–43 vote. Later that day, his nomination was confirmed by a 51–44 vote. He received his judicial commission on November 22, 2024.

=== Notable cases ===
In State of New York v. United States Department of Energy (2025), Kasubhai blocked a U.S. Department of Energy policy that limited reimbursement of indirect and employee-benefit costs for state and local government grants to 10 percent of the total award. He held that the policy conflicted with federal regulations requiring agencies to recognize negotiated indirect-cost rates, vacated the policy, and enjoined the department from implementing it. The Department of Energy subsequently rescinded the policy and voluntarily dismissed its appeal.

In United States v. Oregon (2026), Kasubhai dismissed a Department of Justice lawsuit seeking Oregon's unredacted statewide voter-registration records, which included information such as full dates of birth, driver's-license numbers, and partial Social Security numbers. He concluded that the National Voter Registration Act, the Help America Vote Act, and the Civil Rights Act of 1960 did not authorize the federal government to compel production of the requested information. The decision is currently on appeal in the Ninth Circuit.

In M-J-M-A- v. Wamsley (2026), Kasubhai issued a preliminary injunction restricting warrantless civil-immigration arrests in Oregon. Kasubhai's order required immigration officers making an arrest without a warrant to first make an individualized determination, supported by probable cause, that the person was likely to escape before a warrant could be obtained.

In Oregon v. Kennedy (2026), Kasubhai granted summary judgment to a coalition of states challenging a declaration issued by Secretary of Health and Human Services Robert F. Kennedy Jr. concerning gender-affirming medical care for minors. The declaration stated that such care did not meet professionally recognized standards and asserted that providers offering it could be excluded from federal programs including Medicare and Medicaid. Kasubhai held that the declaration exceeded the department's statutory authority, had been issued without required notice-and-comment procedures, and improperly displaced state-recognized standards of medical care. He vacated the declaration and enjoined the department from enforcing it or a materially similar policy against providers in the plaintiff states.

In Renshaw v. General Services Administration (2026), Kasubhai granted a preliminary injunction sought by Eugene-area activists challenging a security fence that prevented public access to much of the plaza surrounding the Eugene Federal Building. The building had been the site of recurring protests against immigration enforcement and the Trump administration. The General Services Administration announced plans for the fence after a January 30, 2026 protest was declared a riot by Eugene police following damage to the building, including broken windows. The agency said the fence barrier was necessary to protect federal employees, visitors, and the facility. Kasubhai concluded that the plaintiffs were likely to establish that the plaza was a traditional public forum and that closing nearly the entire area was not narrowly tailored to the government's security interests. Kasubhai ordered the General Services Administration to remove the fence, while permitting more limited security measures immediately surrounding the building's entrances and windows. After a brief administrative stay during appellate proceedings, the fence was removed in July 2026.

== See also ==
- List of first minority male lawyers and judges in Oregon
- Joe Biden judicial appointment controversies

== Notes ==
Legal offices
Preceded by Ann Aiken	Judge of the United States District Court for the District of Oregon; 2024–present	Incumbent
