= NELF =

NELF may refer to:

- Nasal embryonic LHRH factor, a protein encoded by the NSMF gene
- Negative elongation factor, a protein complex
- New England Legal Foundation
- Near East Land Forces, a former part of the British Near East Command
- New European Left Forum; see Party of the European Left
