= Lincoln Caplan =

American journalist

Lincoln W. Caplan, II
- Born: 1950 (age 74–75); New Haven, Connecticut, U.S.
- Education: Harvard University (BA, JD); Emmanuel College, Cambridge
- Notable work: The Tenth Justice: The Solicitor General and the Rule of Law
- Spouse: Susan L. Carney (m. 1979)
- Children: Molly Caplan
- Parents: Lewis E. Caplan (father); Jane S. Caplan (mother)
- Website: http://www.lincolncaplan.com/

Lincoln W. Caplan, II (born 1950) is an American author, scholar, and journalist. He is the Truman Capote Visiting Lecturer in Law and a Senior Research Scholar in Law at Yale Law School.

== Early life and education ==
Caplan was born in 1950 in New Haven, Connecticut. He attended Phillips Exeter Academy in Exeter, New Hampshire, where he graduated in 1968. He then attended Harvard College, where he graduated magna cum laude in 1972, after which he attended Emmanuel College, Cambridge, for one year. He earned a Juris Doctor degree from Harvard Law School in 1976.

== Career ==
Caplan began his career in journalism as an intern for The New Republic after his first year of law school. His first piece covered the oral argument in United States v. Nixon. He began writing for The New Yorker in 1978, and worked on the newspaper for several decades as a member of the editorial board. From 1998 to 2006 he worked on the faculty of Yale Law School, where he found and headed the Legal Affairs magazine in 2002. From July 2006 to July 2010, he served as a managing partner of SeaChange Capital Partners. He has worked as a clerk for the chief justice of the Connecticut Supreme Court, a management consultant for the Boston Consulting Group, and a White House Fellow. He was awarded the Guggenheim Fellowship in 1989 for the study of general nonfiction. He has also taught at the University of Virginia School of Law. Caplan has authored six books on legal topics. His book, The Insanity Defense and the Trial of John W. Hinckley, Jr., was awarded a Silver Gavel Award by the American Bar Association.

== Personal life ==
Lincoln Caplan married Susan L. Carney, a judge for United States Court of Appeals for the Second Circuit. Their daughter, Molly, was born in 1988.

== Bibliography ==
- The Insanity Defense and the Trial of John W. Hinckley, Jr. (1984)
- The Tenth Justice: The Solicitor General and the Rule of Law (1987)
- An Open Adoption (1990)
- Skadden: Power, Money, and the Rise of a Legal Empire (1993)
- Up Against the Law: Affirmative Action and the Supreme Court (1997)
- American Justice 2016: The Political Supreme Court (2016)
