= Bette Lasky =

American politician (born 1947)

Member of the New Hampshire Senate from the 13th district
- In office December 5, 2012 – December 5, 2018
- Preceded by: Gary Lambert
- Succeeded by: Cindy Rosenwald
- In office December 3, 2008 – December 1, 2010
- Preceded by: Joseph Foster
- Succeeded by: Gary Lambert

Member of the New Hampshire House of Representatives from the Hillsborough 26th district
- In office December 2, 1998 – December 3, 2008

Personal details
- Born: March 16, 1947 (age 79) Quincy, Massachusetts, U.S.
- Party: Democratic
- Spouse: Elliot
- Profession: homemaker

Bette R. Lasky (born March 16, 1947) was a member of the New Hampshire Senate, representing the 13th District from 2008 to 2010, and again from 2012 until her retirement in 2018. During her tenure, Lasky represented Wards 3, 4, 6, 7, 8, and 9 in Nashua, New Hampshire. While on the State Senate she has served as Chair of the Election Law and Veteran's affairs Committee. Lasky has also served as Vice-Chair of the Judiciary Committee, and as a member of the Education Committee, and the Energy, Environment, and Economic Development Committee.

Prior to becoming a State Senator, Lasky served in the New Hampshire House of Representatives for five terms, and served as Assistant Majority Leader during the 2007-2008 biennium. Prior to that, Lasky served as the House Minority Whip. Lasky has also served as Chair of the Nashua Planning Board, as a Nashua City Councilwoman, and as Vice Chairman of the Nashua City Committee.

Lasky holds a degree in Political Science from the University of Massachusetts Amherst, and currently lives in Nashua with her husband Dr. Elliot Lasky. They have two grown daughters. Lasky has been active in the community for many years, and has held several volunteer positions. Lasky has served on the Board of Directors for Girls, Inc., as well as for the Disability Rights Center.
