= Legal Affairs =

- Frequency: Bimonthly
- Founder: Lincoln Caplan
- Founded: 2002
- Final issue: March/April 2006
- Country: United States
- Based in: New Haven, Connecticut
- Language: English
- Website: legalaffairs.org
- ISSN: 1538-8123

Legal Affairs was an American legal magazine that was launched under the auspices of Yale Law School, and which later became an independent non-profit venture with an educational mission. As the first general-interest legal magazine, Legal Affairs featured stories that centered on the intersection of law and everyday life. The award-winning magazine was a finalist for National Magazine Awards in the categories of general excellence and public interest reporting. Legal Affairs was founded in 2002 by Lincoln Caplan, who was previously an editor at U.S. News & World Report and a Staff Writer for The New Yorker. It ceased publication in 2006.
