= Jabari Wamble =

American lawyer (born 1979)

- Born: Jabari Brooks Wamble; July 17, 1979 (age 46); Oklahoma City, Oklahoma, U.S.
- Education: University of Kansas (BA, JD)
- Spouse: Marissa Cleaver

Jabari Brooks Wamble (born July 17, 1979) is an American lawyer who is a former nominee to serve as a United States district judge of the United States District Court for the District of Kansas. He is a former nominee for the United States Court of Appeals for the Tenth Circuit.

== Education ==
Wamble earned a Bachelor of Arts degree from the University of Kansas in 2002 and a Juris Doctor from the University of Kansas School of Law in 2006.

As an undergraduate, Wamble was an All-American sprinter for the Kansas Jayhawks track and field team. Running the Kansas 400 meters leg, Wamble finished 6th in the distance medley relay at the 2001 NCAA Division I Indoor Track and Field Championships.

== Career ==
In 2006 and 2007, Wamble served as an assistant district attorney in the Johnson County District Attorney's office. From 2007 to 2011, he was an assistant attorney general in the Office of the Kansas Attorney General. Wamble has served as an assistant United States attorney in the United States Attorney's Office for the District of Kansas since 2011.

=== Notable cases ===
In 2011, Wamble prosecuted Luis Lozano-Lara, who was not a citizen of the United States. Lozano-Lara was charged with unlawfully re-entering the United States after having been convicted of an aggravated felony and deported.

In 2013, Wamble prosecuted Advantage Framing, a framing company in Spring Hill, Kansas, charged with harboring undocumented workers employed by the company. The company allegedly issued checks to crew leaders, who then cashed the checks and paid the workers in cash. The company did not pay the undocumented workers Social Security costs, workers compensation or unemployment benefits that would be paid to lawfully employed workers. The three owners of the company were each sentenced to 366 days in prison.

In 2016, Wamble prosecuted Overland Park businessman Richard Ballard on two counts of wire fraud after he raised about $1.23 million from 18 people for five business ventures Ballard founded. Ballard was sentenced to 27 months in prison and ordered to pay $415,000 in restitution.

In March 2022, a federal judge ordered Kansas businessman Charlie James to pay approximately $215,000 in restitution and serve one year of probation as part of his sentence for failing to pay payroll taxes to the Internal Revenue Service. James was the co-owner of KC United, LLC and pleaded guilty to one count of conspiracy to defraud the United States. Wamble prosecuted the case.

=== Expired nomination to federal court of appeals ===
On August 9, 2022, President Joe Biden announced his intent to nominate Wamble to serve as a United States circuit judge of the United States Court of Appeals for the Tenth Circuit. On September 6, 2022, his nomination was sent to the Senate. Biden nominated Wamble to the seat vacated by Judge Mary Beck Briscoe, who assumed senior status on March 15, 2021. On January 3, 2023, his nomination was returned to the President under Rule XXXI, Paragraph 6 of the United States Senate. Biden subsequently nominated Richard Federico to fill this vacancy, and he was confirmed on December 11, 2023

=== Failed nomination to district court ===
On February 22, 2023, President Biden announced his intent to nominate Wamble to serve as a United States district judge of the United States District Court for the District of Kansas. On February 27, 2023, his nomination was sent to the Senate. Biden nominated Wamble to the seat vacated by Judge Julie A. Robinson, who assumed senior status on January 14, 2022. Senators Jerry Moran and Roger Marshall withheld their support of Wamble's nomination because of a lack of clarity over who would be nominated to a seat on the Tenth Circuit.

On May 23, 2023, Wamble asked the Biden administration to withdraw his nomination. There were fears that the American Bar Association would rate him "not qualified." The US Attorney's office in Kansas was held in contempt of court for failing to cooperate with an investigation in which prosecutors accessed confidential phone calls between attorneys and clients at Leavenworth Detention Center. Wamble was involved in the case and reportedly offered conflicting statements regarding how he handled one of the recordings, resulting in criticism of Wamble. On May 30, 2023, the White House officially withdrew his nomination.

== Personal life ==
Wamble is married to Marissa Cleaver and is the son-in-law of Missouri Congressman Emanuel Cleaver.

== See also ==
- Joe Biden judicial appointment controversies
