= Sarah F. Russell =

American judge (born 1976)

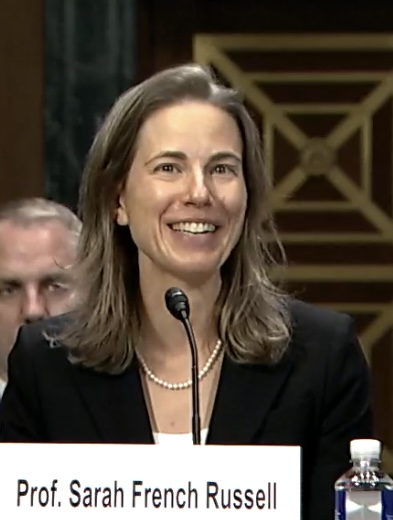

Judge of the United States District Court for the District of Connecticut
- Incumbent
- Assumed office November 26, 2024
- Appointed by: Joe Biden
- Preceded by: Sarah A. L. Merriam

Personal details
- Born: 1976 (age 49–50) Boston, Massachusetts, U.S.
- Education: Yale University (BA, JD)

Sarah French Russell (born 1976) is an American lawyer and academic who serves as a United States district judge of the United States District Court for the District of Connecticut.

== Early life and education ==
Russell's parents met as undergraduates in their freshman English class at Harvard College. She received her Bachelor of Arts from Yale College in 1998 and a Juris Doctor from Yale Law School in 2002.

== Career ==
From 2002 to 2003, she served as a law clerk for Chief Judge Michael Mukasey on the United States District Court for the Southern District of New York and for Judge Chester J. Straub on the United States Court of Appeals for the Second Circuit from 2003 to 2005. From 2005 to 2007, Russell was an assistant federal defender in the Office of the Federal Public Defender for the District of Connecticut. From 2007 to 2010, she was a lecturer in law and director of the Arthur Liman Public Interest Program at Yale Law School, where she taught criminal defense, prison legal services, and Supreme Court advocacy clinics. From 2011 to 2024, she was a law professor and director of the Civil Justice Clinic at Quinnipiac University School of Law.

=== Federal judicial service ===
On October 4, 2023, President Joe Biden nominated Russell to serve as a United States district judge of the United States District Court for the District of Connecticut. President Biden nominated Russell to the seat vacated by Judge Sarah A. L. Merriam, who was elevated to the United States Court of Appeals for the Second Circuit on September 28, 2022. On November 1, 2023, a hearing on her nomination was held before the Senate Judiciary Committee. During her confirmation hearing, she was questioned over a letter she had signed in March 2020 urging Connecticut's governor to free people from the state's prisons and declare a moratorium, however she did not state within the letter whether her views were infinite or only for the duration of COVID-19. Russell did not include the letter in background materials she compiled for the committee. On November 30, 2023, her nomination was reported out of committee by a party line 11–10 vote. On January 3, 2024, her nomination was returned to the president under Rule XXXI, Paragraph 6 of the United States Senate and she was renominated on January 8, 2024. On January 18, 2024, her nomination was reported out of committee by an 11–10 party-line vote. On November 19, 2024, the Senate invoked cloture on her nomination by a 50–45 vote, with Senator Joe Manchin voting against the motion. Later that day, her nomination was confirmed by a 50–44 vote, with Senator Manchin voting against confirmation. She received her judicial commission on November 26, 2024. She was sworn in on December 20, 2024.

== See also ==
- Joe Biden judicial appointment controversies

Legal offices
Preceded by Sarah A. L. Merriam	Judge of the United States District Court for the District of Connecticut; 2024–present	Incumbent
