= Ann Aiken =

American judge (born 1951)

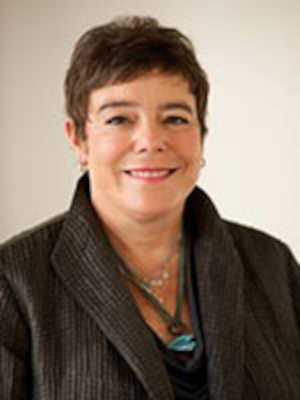

Senior Judge of the United States District Court for the District of Oregon
- Incumbent
- Assumed office December 29, 2023

Chief Judge of the United States District Court for the District of Oregon
- In office February 1, 2009 – January 31, 2016
- Preceded by: Ancer L. Haggerty
- Succeeded by: Michael W. Mosman

Judge of the United States District Court for the District of Oregon
- In office February 4, 1998 – December 29, 2023
- Appointed by: Bill Clinton
- Preceded by: James A. Redden
- Succeeded by: Mustafa T. Kasubhai

Personal details
- Born: Ann Louise Aiken; December 29, 1951 (age 74) Salem, Oregon, U.S.
- Spouse: James Klonoski (m. 1978; died 2009)
- Children: 5
- Education: University of Oregon (BS, JD); Rutgers University (MA)

Ann Louise Aiken (born December 29, 1951) is an American attorney and jurist in the state of Oregon. A native Oregonian, she has served as a state court judge of the Oregon circuit courts and worked in private legal practice. She is a senior United States district judge of the United States District Court for the District of Oregon. She served as chief judge of the court from February 1, 2009 to January 31, 2016.

== Early years ==
Aiken was born in Salem, Oregon, in 1951. In 1974, she graduated from the University of Oregon with a Bachelor of Science degree, and then from Rutgers University in New Jersey in 1976 with a Master of Arts degree. Aiken returned to Oregon and graduated with a Juris Doctor in 1979 from the University of Oregon School of Law. After law school, she worked as a law clerk for Judge Edwin Allen of the Lane County Circuit Court from 1979 to 1980.

== Career ==
She entered private legal practice in 1980 and remained there until 1982. In 1982, Aiken worked as a fundraiser and field staffer for Ted Kulongoski's unsuccessful campaign for Governor of Oregon in 1982, and then worked as the chief clerk of the Oregon House of Representatives from 1982 to 1983. Aiken returned to private practice that year and remained there until she became a district judge in Lane County in 1988. Based in Eugene, she then became an Lane County Circuit Court Judge in 1992, remaining on the bench until 1997.

=== Federal judicial service ===
President Bill Clinton nominated her to a seat on the United States District Court for the District of Oregon vacated by James A. Redden in November 1995, and again on January 7, 1997. Aiken was confirmed by the United States Senate on January 28, 1998, receiving her commission on February 4, 1998. On February 1, 2009, she became Chief Judge of the Court, the first woman to hold that position in the District of Oregon. She served in that capacity until January 31, 2016. She assumed senior status on December 29, 2023.

=== Notable decisions ===
On September 26, 2007, Judge Aiken declared unconstitutional two portions of the USA PATRIOT Act that deal with the government's power to conduct certain surveillance without first obtaining a warrant. The decision received national attention and came in the case of the Brandon Mayfield lawsuit against the federal government for false detainment following the 2004 Madrid train bombings, in which Mayfield was uninvolved in the bombings. In the decision, Aiken held that those provisions of the Foreign Intelligence Surveillance Act violate the Fourth Amendment to the United States Constitution.

On October 7, 2015, Judge Aiken resentenced Dwight L. Hammond and his son Steven D. Hammond to five years in prison with credit for time served for federal arson, the mandatory minimum for that crime. The Hammonds had illegally set fires on their ranch which burned 140 acres (57 ha) of federal land. U.S. District Judge Michael R. Hogan had sentenced the Hammonds to 3 months and 1 year in prison respectively, but Judge Aiken ruled that the minimum sentences must be followed. Armed militiamen led by Ammon Bundy occupied the Malheur Wildlife Refuge near the Hammonds' ranch in protest of the ruling, demanding that the Hammonds be released and that the hundred-year-old wildlife refuge be given over to local control. The defendants in the case were granted a full Presidential pardon by President Donald J. Trump on July 10, 2018.

Judge Aiken made a key decision in the case Juliana v. United States, a suit brought by 21 youths against the U.S. government stating their rights to a clean environment were violated due to actions that the government had taken. While several similar suits at state and federal level had been dismissed, Judge Aiken instead was compelled by the argument that access to a clean environment was a fundamental right, allowing the case to proceed. This decision was reversed by the United States Court of Appeals for the Ninth Circuit, which remanded the case with instructions to dismiss it. Nevertheless, on remand, Judge Aiken allowed Plaintiffs to amend their complaint and allowed the case to continue. Once back before the Court of Appeals on a petition for writ of mandamus, the Ninth Circuit granted the petition and again instructed Judge Aiken "to dismiss the case forthwith."

== Personal ==
In 1978, Aiken married James Klonoski, a political science professor at the University of Oregon and one-time chair of the Democratic Party of Oregon. Klonoski died in January 2009. They had five sons together.

== See also ==
- List of first women lawyers and judges in Oregon

Legal offices
Preceded by James A. Redden	Judge of the United States District Court for the District of Oregon; 1998–2023	Succeeded by Mustafa T. Kasubhai
Preceded by Ancer L. Haggerty	Chief Judge of the United States District Court for the District of Oregon; 2009–2016	Succeeded by Michael W. Mosman
