= Courts of Washington, D.C. =

Courts of Washington, D.C. include:

Courts of the District of Columbia

- District of Columbia Court of Appeals, equivalent to a state supreme court
  - Superior Court of the District of Columbia, local trial court of general jurisdiction

Federal courts located in Washington, D.C.

- Supreme Court of the United States, highest court in the United States
  - United States Court of Appeals for the District of Columbia Circuit, appellate jurisdiction
  - United States Court of Appeals for the Federal Circuit, limited nationwide appellate jurisdiction
  - United States Court of Appeals for the Armed Forces, appellate jurisdiction over the Uniform Code of Military Justice
    - Navy-Marine Corps Court of Criminal Appeals
    - Coast Guard Court of Criminal Appeals
    - United States District Court for the District of Columbia, federal trial court
    - United States Court of Federal Claims, nationwide jurisdiction over monetary claims against the federal government
    - United States Tax Court, nationwide jurisdiction over federal income tax law
