= Jeffrey R. Howard =

American judge (born 1955)

Jeffrey Howard

Senior Judge of the United States Court of Appeals for the First Circuit
- Incumbent
- Assumed office March 31, 2022

Chief Judge of the United States Court of Appeals for the First Circuit
- In office June 16, 2015 – March 31, 2022
- Preceded by: Sandra Lynch
- Succeeded by: David J. Barron

Judge of the United States Court of Appeals for the First Circuit
- In office May 3, 2002 – March 31, 2022
- Appointed by: George W. Bush
- Preceded by: Norman H. Stahl
- Succeeded by: Seth Aframe

25th Attorney General of New Hampshire
- In office February 25, 1993 – August 21, 1997
- Governor: Steve Merrill
- Preceded by: John Arnold
- Succeeded by: Philip McLaughlin

United States Attorney for the District of New Hampshire
- In office 1989–1992
- President: George H. W. Bush
- Preceded by: Peter Papps
- Succeeded by: Peter Papps

Personal details
- Born: Jeffrey Robert Howard; November 4, 1955 (age 70) Claremont, New Hampshire, U.S.
- Education: Plymouth State University (BA); Georgetown University (JD)

Jeffrey Robert Howard (born November 4, 1955) is an American lawyer who serves as a senior United States circuit judge of the United States Court of Appeals for the First Circuit.

== Biography ==
Howard graduated from Plymouth State College (now Plymouth State University) in 1978 with a Bachelor of Arts degree and he received a Juris Doctor from the Georgetown University Law Center in 1981. After law school, Howard was an attorney in the New Hampshire Attorney General's Office, rising to become Deputy Attorney General.

== Political career ==
In 1989, he was appointed by President George H. W. Bush to become the United States attorney for the District of New Hampshire. In 1993, he left that position to become the New Hampshire Attorney General, nominated by Governor Steve Merrill. He served as Attorney General until 1997, when he stepped down, allowing Democratic Governor Jeanne Shaheen to nominate Philip McLaughlin. After serving as attorney general, Howard went back to private practice.

== Federal judicial service ==
In September 2001, Howard was nominated to the United States Court of Appeals for the First Circuit by President George W. Bush. The United States Senate confirmed him on April 23, 2002 by a 99–0 vote. He received his commission on May 3, 2002. He served as chief judge from 2015 to 2022. He assumed senior status on March 31, 2022.

Legal offices
Preceded by Norman H. Stahl	Judge of the United States Court of Appeals for the First Circuit; 2002–2022	Succeeded by Seth Aframe
Preceded by Sandra Lynch	Chief Judge of the United States Court of Appeals for the First Circuit; 2015–2022	Succeeded by David J. Barron
