= List of Superior Court districts in Washington =

This is a list of the Superior Court districts in the state of Washington. There are a total of 32 Superior Court districts for the 39 counties of Washington, with most districts consisting of a single county. While each county has a Superior Court, some of the less populated counties are grouped into a single district, sharing a single judge and administration. The judge for these multi-county districts rotates between the counties as needed, with each County Superior Court having its own courtroom and staff.

== Superior Court districts ==
- Adams County Superior Court District
- Asotin/Columbia/Garfield Superior Court District
- Benton/Franklin Superior Court District
- Chelan County Superior Court District
- Clallam County Superior Court District
- Clark County Superior Court District
- Cowlitz County Superior Court District
- Douglas County Superior Court District
- Ferry/Pend Oreille/Stevens Superior Court District
- Grant County Superior Court District
- Grays Harbor County Superior Court District
- Island County Superior Court District
- Jefferson County Superior Court District
- King County Superior Court District
- Kitsap County Superior Court District
- Kittitas County Superior Court District
- Klickitat/Skamania Superior Court District
- Lewis County Superior Court District
- Lincoln County Superior Court District
- Mason County Superior Court District
- Okanogan County Superior Court District
- Pacific/Wahkiakum Superior Court District
- Pierce County Superior Court District
- San Juan County Superior Court District
- Skagit County Superior Court District
- Snohomish County Superior Court District
- Spokane County Superior Court District
- Thurston County Superior Court District
- Walla Walla County Superior Court District
- Whatcom County Superior Court District
- Whitman County Superior Court District
- Yakima County Superior Court District

== See also ==
- Washington court system
