= Washington state court system =

Judicial system in Washington State, USA

In Washington, there are several state courts. Judges are elected and serve four-year or six-year terms. Most judges first come to office when the governor of Washington appoints them after a vacancy is created – either by the death, resignation, retirement, or removal of a sitting judge, or when a new seat on the bench is created by the Washington State Legislature

== Courts ==
The Washington state court system is made up of four court levels. The highest court is the Washington state Supreme Court, followed by the Court of Appeals, the Superior Courts, and the Courts of Limited Jurisdiction.

Most cases, both criminal and civil, begin at the district, municipal, or superior levels first. Misdemeanor cases and smaller civil disputes start in district or municipal courts, while felonies and larger civil cases are handled by the superior courts. When a case is appealed, it then moves to the Court of Appeals, which must accept all cases with no exceptions. The Washington Supreme Court reviews cases at its own discretion, except for capital punishment cases which receive automatic review.

The structure of today’s Washington state court system developed over time. When the state constitution was first approved on October 1 of 1889, it formed a Supreme Court with five justices, each elected by Washington voters. In 1907, the state changed its elections to nonpartisan, and in 1909, the Supreme Court increased its number of justices to nine, which is still in effect today. The Court of Appeals was later created in 1969 as an intermediate appellate court.

=== Supreme Court ===
The Washington state Supreme Court is the highest level court and oversees the entire state judiciary. As the court of last resort, they are responsible for reviewing decisions made by the lower courts and receive over 1,000 requests for review per year. The Court has discretionary jurisdiction, meaning it only accepts a fraction of these requests, often prioritizing cases that involve conflicting appellate decisions, major constitutional questions, or issues of broad public importance.

The Supreme Court hears about 45 cases during each four-month session, and publish close to 150 decisions each year. The justices split responsibility for writing the Court’s opinions, and at least five of the nine must agree before a ruling is made.

The nine justices of the Supreme Court serve a 6-year term through statewide, nonpartisan elections, meaning there are no justices affiliated with a political party. The terms are staggered so that three justices are elected every two years. To qualify, candidates must have been licensed attorneys in the state of Washington for at least five years, and under the age of 75. If vacancies occur, they’re filled by the Washington's Governor and are then up for election at the state’s next general election. The Chief Justice is the head of the court and is elected internally by the Supreme Court, who serves a term of 4 years.

=== Court of Appeals ===
The Washington Court of Appeals has three divisions, based in Tacoma, Seattle, and Spokane. This court considers appeals in civil and criminal cases that are appealed from Superior Courts.

An appeal to the Court of Appeals is a matter of right - unlike the Washington Supreme Court, which has discretionary jurisdiction, the State Court of Appeals has mandatory jurisdiction – it must hear all civil and criminal appeals that are filed with the court. Court of Appeals judges are elected and serve six-year terms.

=== Superior Court ===
Washington has 39 Superior Courts, one in each of Washington's 39 counties. Superior Courts are the trial courts of general jurisdiction in Washington. A Superior Court may consider all civil and criminal matters occurring within a county's boundary. The Superior Court also has exclusive jurisdiction over civil matters in which the amount in controversy is more than $75,000, felony cases, estate and probate matters, family law cases (including divorces and child custody hearings), and juvenile proceedings. They act as a court of appeal for cases from the District and Municipal Courts. Superior Court judges are elected and serve four-year terms.

=== Courts of Limited Jurisdiction ===
==== District Courts ====
Each of Washington's 39 counties also has a state District Court. These are courts of limited jurisdiction that hear traffic infractions, criminal traffic citations, misdemeanors and gross misdemeanors, civil cases with an amount in controversy less than $100,000, and small claims suits. The District Court conducts trials and other attendant hearings. District Court judges are elected and serve four-year terms.

==== Municipal Courts ====
Washington's cities may establish Municipal Courts (e.g., Seattle Municipal Court). Municipal Courts are courts of limited jurisdiction like state District Courts, but Municipal Courts may not hear civil lawsuits. A Municipal Court may only consider and has exclusive jurisdiction over non-criminal traffic citations, as well as misdemeanor and gross misdemeanor crimes that occur within a city's boundary. Municipal Courts conduct trials and other attendant hearings. Municipal Court judges are elected or appointed by mayors or city councils and serve four-year terms.
