= New Hampshire's 13th State Senate district =

American legislative district

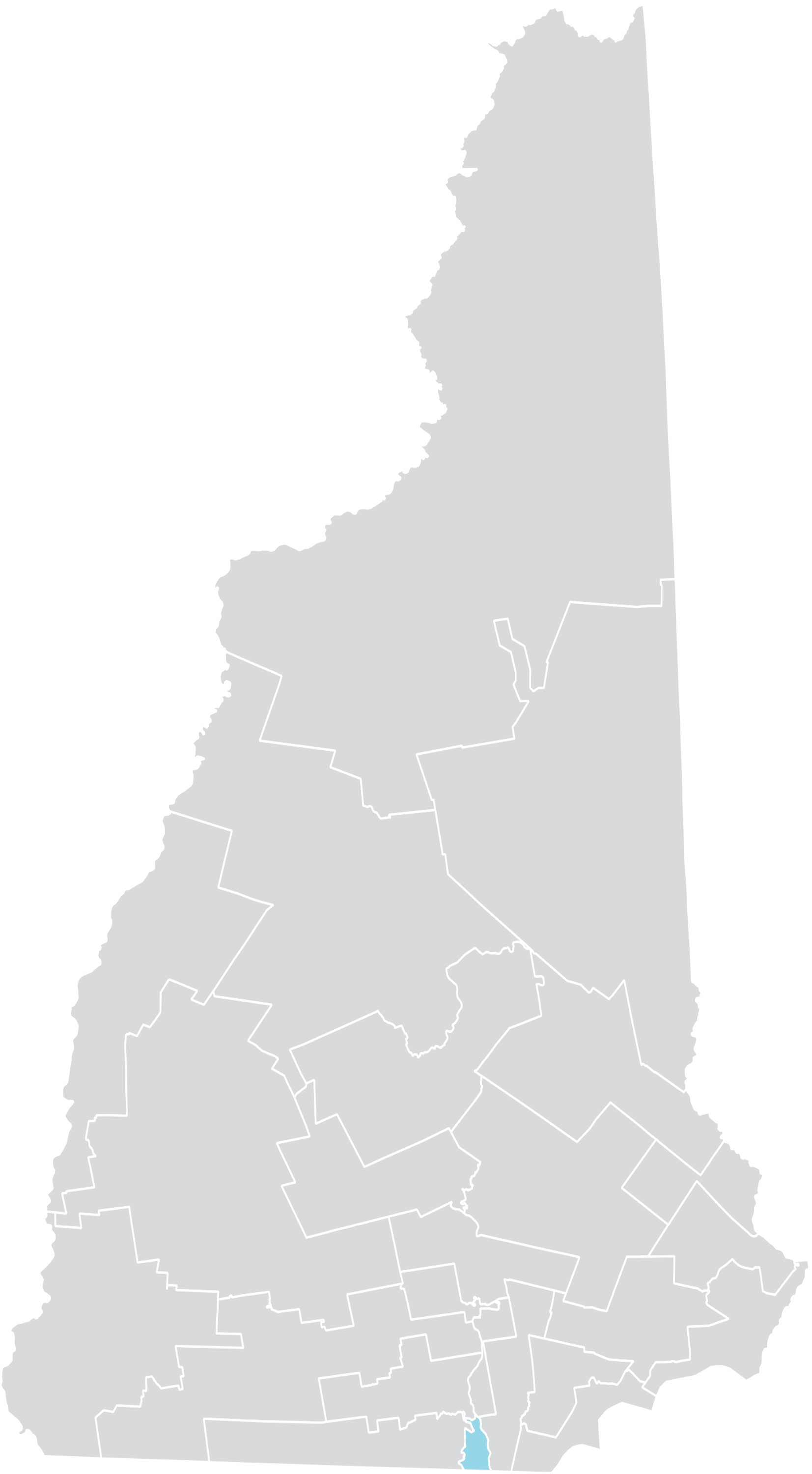
Senator
Cindy Rosenwald; D–Nashua
- Registration: 43.5% Democratic; 23.2% Republican; 33.2% No party preference
- Demographics: 68.8% White; 3.2% Black; 15.8% Hispanic; 8.6% Asian
- Population (2019) • Citizens of voting age: 59,903; 42,468

New Hampshire's 13th State Senate district is one of 24 districts in the New Hampshire Senate. It has been represented by Democrat Cindy Rosenwald since 2018, succeeding fellow Democrat Bette Lasky.

== Geography ==
District 13 is based in Nashua in Hillsborough County, including the city's 3rd, 4th, 6th, 7th, 8th, and 9th wards.

The district is located entirely within New Hampshire's 2nd congressional district. It borders the state of Massachusetts. At just under 16 square miles, it is the smallest Senate district in the state.

== Recent election results ==
=== 2024 ===
2024 New Hampshire State Senate election, District 13
Party	Candidate	Votes	%
Democratic	Cindy Rosenwald (Incumbent)	14,334	56.72
Republican	Stephen Scaer	10,913	43.19
Write-in		23	0.09
Total votes		25,270	100.0
Democratic hold			

=== 2022 ===
2022 New Hampshire State Senate election, District 13
Party	Candidate	Votes	%
Democratic	Cindy Rosenwald (incumbent)	10,445	58.8
Republican	Stephen Scaer	7,319	41.2
Total votes		17,772	100.0

=== 2020 ===
2020 New Hampshire State Senate election, District 13
Party	Candidate	Votes	%
Democratic	Cindy Rosenwald (incumbent)	15,611	58.6
Republican	Mariellen MacKay	11,042	41.4
Total votes		26,653	100
Democratic hold			

=== 2018 ===
2018 New Hampshire State Senate election, District 13
Party	Candidate	Votes	%
Democratic	Cindy Rosenwald	11,307	60.9
Republican	David Schoneman	7,259	39.1
Total votes		18,566	100
Democratic hold			

=== 2016 ===
2016 New Hampshire State Senate election, District 13
Party	Candidate	Votes	%
Democratic	Bette Lasky (incumbent)	14,619	59.6
Republican	Joan Donahue	9,897	40.4
Total votes		24,516	100
Democratic hold			

=== 2014 ===
2014 New Hampshire State Senate election, District 13
Party	Candidate	Votes	%
Democratic	Bette Lasky (incumbent)	8,729	56.8
Republican	Doris Hohensee	6,628	43.2
Total votes		15,357	100
Democratic hold			

=== 2012 ===
2012 New Hampshire State Senate election, District 13
Party	Candidate	Votes	%
Democratic	Bette Lasky	15,314	65.1
Republican	Joseph Krasucki	8,224	34.9
Total votes		23,538	100
Democratic gain from Republican			

=== Federal and statewide results ===
Year	Office	Results
2020	President	Biden 60.4% – 38.0%
2020	Senate	Shaheen 63.8% – 33.4%
2016	President	Clinton 55.3 – 39.8%
2014	Senate	Shaheen 55.1 – 44.9%
2014	Governor	Hassan 55.1 – 44.9%
2012	President	Obama 59.0 – 39.7%
2012	Governor	Hassan 60.7 – 36.2%
