= New England Legal Foundation =

Legal advocacy organization

Coordinates: 42.3510°N 71.0585°W

- Company type: 501(c)(3)
- Founded: 1977
- Headquarters: 333 Washington Street, Suite 850; Boston, Massachusetts
- Area served: New England
- Website: newenglandlegal.org

The New England Legal Foundation (NELF) is an American not-for-profit legal foundation. NELF states that it challenges intrusions by governments and special interest groups which would interfere with the economic freedoms of U.S. citizens and business enterprises in New England and the nation. According to its website, its ongoing mission is to "champion individual economic liberties, traditional property rights, properly limited government, and balanced economic growth throughout the six state New England region."

== Mission ==
The foundation's stated mission is "promoting public discourse on the proper role of free enterprise in American society and advancing free enterprise principles in the courtroom." The New England Legal Foundation is, as the name implies, a non-profit public interest law firm in New England whose purpose is to address policy and constitutional concerns related to free enterprise. Its mission is promoting public discourse on the proper role of free enterprise in our society and advancing free enterprise principles in the courtroom. NELF identifies as non-partisan, and is based on the premise that "while the free market should not be left entirely unregulated, it usually provides the greatest opportunity for the greatest number when left free from unwarranted intrusion."

NELF does not charge attorney's fees for its legal services. Its operating funds are provided through tax-deductible contributions made by individuals, businesses, law firms, and private charitable foundations who believe in NELF's mission.

== Cases ==
NELF states that it handles "precedent setting cases that involve business, financial and economic issues. The most common subject areas on its docket are government regulation, property rights, taxation and employment law." NELF challenges what it believes are "unwarranted government intrusion on the free market by seeking redress in the courts."

NELF states that it deals with cases that involve economic or commercial questions, and does not become involved in social issues. It selects cases based on their likelihood of creating precedent that will have policy and/or constitutional impact for the business community and society as a whole. NELF states that it selects cases in which it can "make policy, legislative history or empirical arguments which are not featured, or at least not emphasized, in the parties' briefs."
