= Party-line vote =

Vote within a deliberative assembly where a majority of party members vote the same way

A party-line vote in a deliberative assembly (such as a constituent assembly, parliament, or legislature) is a vote in which a substantial majority of members of a political party vote the same way (usually in opposition to the other political party(ies) whose members vote the opposite way).

Sources vary on what proportion of party members must adhere to the party line in order for the vote to constitute a "party-line" vote. For example, in the United States, the Congressional Record has stated: "A party-line vote is one on which a majority of Republicans vote one way and a majority of Democrats vote another. A bipartisan vote is one in which a majority of Republicans and a majority of Democrats vote the same way". Another source defined this event for purposes of classifying votes for research purposes as "one where 90 percent of the majority party votes against 90 percent of the minority party". Party-line votes are also noted to reflect the degree to which the division of power requires parties to retain cohesion in order to implement its goals:

Whether a party-line vote appears on an issue reflects incentives presented by majority rule. In a house where the two parties are nearly evenly balanced, a few defections will be very costly to the (slim) majority party, and party-line votes may prevail. If, in contrast, one party has a substantial majority, some position-taking defections can be permitted.

== United States ==
In the U.S. Congress, it is the function of the party whip of each party in each house to ensure that members adhere to party policies and in particular that members vote for or against bills, amendments, and (in the case of the U.S. Senate) for or against treaties and administration appointments as determined by senior party leadership. The leverage available to the party whip may be in rewards (such as the negotiation of side deals for pork barrel spending) or in punishments (such as withholding appointments to powerful committees). The ultimate threat is to support another candidate in the primary election with endorsements and party funds. The party whip will operate under the direction of the particular party's leader (called respectively the majority leader or the minority leader).

Prior to the 1980s, it was not uncommon for members of the U.S. House of Representatives to "cross the aisle" and vote for legislation supported by the opposing party. By the mid-1990s, however, the House became almost completely partisan and polarized.
