= Burton W. Silcock =

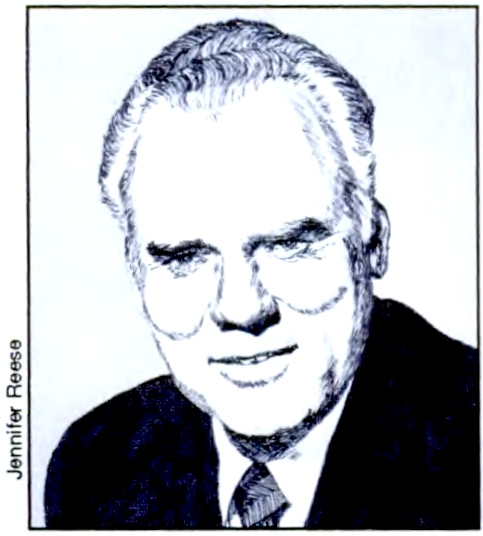

7th Director of the Bureau of Land Management
- In office July 6, 1971 – 1973
- President: Richard Nixon
- Preceded by: Boyd Rasmussen
- Succeeded by: Curt Berklund

Personal details
- Born: July 29, 1922 Burley, Idaho
- Died: January 4, 2008 (aged 85) Meridian, Idaho
- Party: Republican

Burton W. Silcock (July 29, 1922 – January 4, 2008) was an American government administrator who served as Director of the Bureau of Land Management from 1971 to 1973.

Silcock received numerous awards for his work, including the Interior Secretary’s Excellence of Service Award, the Presidential Management Improvement Award, and American Motor’s Conservation Award. Utah State University gave him its Distinguished Service Award in 1984 and a Lifetime Achievement Award in 2000.

He died on January 4, 2008, in Meridian, Idaho at age 85.
