= Bureau of Land Management =

Agency within the US Department of the Interior

Bureau of Land of Management
- Seal of the Bureau of Land Management

- Flag of the Bureau of Land Management

Department overview
- Formed: December 10, 1946; 79 years ago
- Preceding agencies: U.S. Grazing Service; United States General Land Office
- Jurisdiction: United States federal government
- Headquarters: 1849 C Street, N.W., Washington, D.C.; 38°53′41″N 77°02′33″W
- Employees: Over 10,000
- Annual budget: $1.31 billion (FY2021)
- Department executives: Steve Pearce, Director; Bill Groffy, Deputy Director
- Parent Department: United States Department of the Interior
- Website: blm.gov

The Bureau of Land Management (BLM) is an agency within the United States Department of the Interior responsible for administering U.S. federal lands, including all lands in the public domain. Headquartered in Washington, D.C., the BLM oversees more than 247.3 million acres (1,001,000 km^{2}) of land, or one-eighth of the United States's total landmass.

The Bureau was created by 79th United States Congress during the presidency of Harry S Truman in 1946 by combining two existing agencies: the United States General Land Office and the Grazing Service. The agency manages the federal government's nearly 700 million acres (2,800,000 km^{2}) of subsurface mineral estate located beneath federal, state and private lands severed from their surface rights by the Homestead Act of 1862. Most BLM public lands are located in these 12 western states: Alaska, Arizona, California, Colorado, Idaho, Montana, Nevada, New Mexico, Oregon, Utah, Washington and Wyoming.

The mission of the BLM is "to sustain the health, diversity, and productivity of the public lands for the use and enjoyment of present and future generations". Originally BLM holdings were described as "land nobody wanted" because homesteaders had passed them by. All the same, ranchers hold nearly 18,000 permits and leases for livestock grazing on 155 million acres (630,000 km^{2}) of BLM public lands. The agency manages 263 wilderness areas, 31 national monuments and some 710 other protected areas as part of the National Conservation Lands (formerly known as the National Landscape Conservation System), totaling about 39.5 million acres (160,000 km^{2}). In addition the National Conservation Lands include nearly 2,700 miles of Wild and Scenic Rivers, and nearly 6,000 miles of National Scenic and Historic Trails. There are more than 63,000 oil and gas wells on BLM public lands. Total energy leases generated approximately $5.4 billion in 2013, an amount divided among the Treasury, the states, and Native American groups.

== History ==
=== Background ===
Map showing land owned by different federal government agencies. The yellow represents the Bureau of Land Management's holdings.

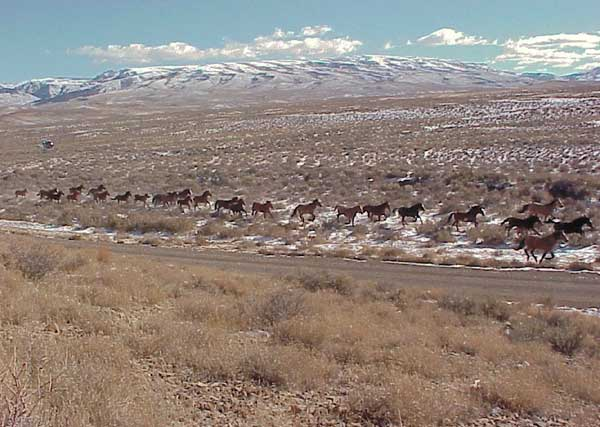
Horses crossing a plain near the Simpson Park Wilderness Study Area in central Nevada, managed by the Battle Mountain BLM Field Office

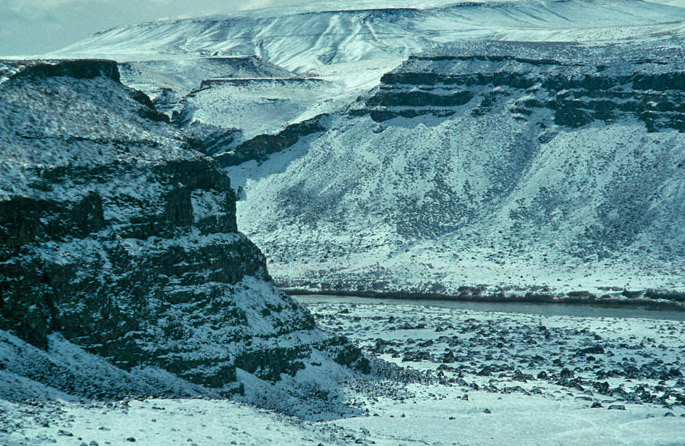
Snow-covered cliffs of Snake River Canyon, Idaho, managed by the Boise District of the BLM

The BLM's roots go back to the Land Ordinance of 1785 and the Northwest Ordinance of 1787. These laws provided for the survey and settlement of the lands that the original Thirteen Colonies ceded to the federal government after the American Revolution. As additional lands were acquired by the United States from Spain, France and other countries, the United States Congress directed that they be explored, surveyed, and made available for settlement.

During the Revolutionary War, military bounty land was promised to soldiers who fought for the colonies. After the war, the Treaty of Paris of 1783, signed by the United States, the UK, France, and Spain, ceded territory to the United States. In the 1780s, other states relinquished their own claims to land in modern-day Ohio. By this time, the United States needed revenue to function and land was sold as a source of income for the government.

In order to sell the land, surveys needed to be conducted. The Land Ordinance of 1785 instructed a geographer to oversee this work as undertaken by a group of surveyors. The first years of surveying were completed by trial and error; once the territory of Ohio had been surveyed, a modern public land survey system had been developed. In 1812, Congress established the United States General Land Office as part of the Department of the Treasury to oversee the disposition of these federal lands. By the early 1800s, promised bounty land claims were finally fulfilled.

In the 19th century, other bounty land and homestead laws were enacted to dispose of federal land. Several different types of patents existed. These include cash entry, credit, homestead, Indian, military warrants, mineral certificates, private land claims, railroads, state selections, swamps, town sites, and town lots. A system of local land offices spread throughout the territories, patenting land that was surveyed via the corresponding Office of the Surveyor General of a particular territory. This pattern gradually spread across the entire United States. The laws that spurred this system with the exception of the General Mining Law of 1872 and the Desert Land Act of 1877 have since been repealed or superseded.

In the early 20th century, Congress took additional steps toward recognizing the value of the assets on public lands and directed the Executive Branch to manage activities on the remaining public lands. The Mineral Leasing Act of 1920 allowed leasing, exploration, and production of selected commodities, such as coal, oil, gas, and sodium to take place on public lands. The Taylor Grazing Act of 1934 established the United States Grazing Service to manage the public rangelands by establishment of advisory boards that set grazing fees. The Oregon and California Revested Lands Sustained Yield Management Act of 1937, commonly referred as the O&C Act, required sustained yield management of the timberlands in western Oregon.

=== Establishment and early history ===
In 1946, the Grazing Service was merged with the United States General Land Office to form the Bureau of Land Management within the Department of the Interior. It took several years for this new agency to integrate and reorganize. In the end, the Bureau of Land Management became less focused on land disposal and more focused on the long term management and preservation of the land. The agency achieved its current form by combining offices in the western states and creating a corresponding office for lands both east of and alongside the Mississippi River. As a matter of course, the BLM's emphasis fell on activities in the western states as most of the mining, land sales, and federally owned areas are located west of the Mississippi.

BLM personnel on the ground have typically been oriented toward local interests, while bureau management in Washington are led by presidential guidance. By means of the Federal Land Policy and Management Act of 1976, Congress created a more unified bureau mission and recognized the value of the remaining public lands by declaring that these lands would remain in public ownership. The law directed that these lands be managed with a view toward "multiple use" defined as "management of the public lands and their various resource values so that they are utilized in the combination that will best meet the present and future needs of the American people."

Since the Reagan administration in the 1980s, Republicans have often given priority to local control and to grazing, mining and petroleum production, while Democrats have more often emphasized environmental concerns even when granting mining and drilling leases. In September 1996, then President Bill Clinton used his authority under the Antiquities Act to establish the Grand Staircase–Escalante National Monument in southern Utah, the first of now 20 national monuments established on BLM lands and managed by the agency. The establishment of Grand Staircase–Escalante foreshadowed later creation of the BLM's National Landscape Conservation System in 2000. Use of the Antiquities Act authority, to the extent it effectively scuttled a coal mine to have been operated by Andalex Resources, delighted recreation and conservation enthusiasts but set up larger confrontations with state and local authorities.

=== First Trump administration ===
Under the Trump administration, the BLM offered millions of acres of available federal lands for 10-year leases for commercial development, potentially in oil and gas and mining, with the stated goal of "promoting American energy security". The BLM holds quarterly oil and gas lease sales. According to a June 18, 2018, article in The Atlantic, under the tenure of then-United States Secretary of the Interior, Ryan Zinke "practically gave away hundreds of thousands of acres of open land across the West, leasing it to energy companies for pennies on the dollar." The Salt Lake Tribune reported that in March 2019, the price per acre for leases near the Golden Spike National Historical Park, in Utah were "$1.50 an acre for the next two years". By September 11, 2018, the Department of Interior was offering 2.9 million acres to be leased to commercial operations including drilling for oil and gas and mining in New Mexico, Colorado, Arizona, and other states where public land is not protected by a national park or monument designation. The BLM's May 30, 2019, statement proposed an additional 183,668 acres on "lands managed by the Canyon Country, Color Country, Green River, and West Desert districts" that would be listed for the quarterly oil and gas lease sale on September 10, 2019. In their May 2019, September lease offerings, the BLM said that they had "245 million acres of public land located primarily in 12 Western states, including Alaska" and across the United States another "700 million acres of sub-surface mineral estate" is under their management. The statement also said that these "diverse activities authorized on these lands generated $96 billion in sales of goods and services throughout the American economy in fiscal year 2017" while supporting over 468,000 jobs".

On August 4, 2020, President Trump signed the Great American Outdoors Act into law, committing up to $1.9 billion from energy development revenues to the National Parks and Public Land Legacy Restoration Fund each year for five years for needed maintenance for critical facilities and infrastructure in national parks, forests, wildlife refuges, recreation areas and American Indian schools. The Act also committed $900 million a year in royalties from offshore oil and natural gas to permanently fund the Land and Water Conservation Fund investments in conservation and recreation opportunities across the country.

Also in August 2020, the BLM headquarters was relocated to Grand Junction, Colorado, by an order signed by Interior Secretary David Bernhardt. The relocation was praised by Republican Western politicians but criticized by Democrats as a move to weaken the agency through the loss of experienced staffers, who opted to stay in Washington, D.C. Some ranchers were concerned about the isolation of Grand Junction compared to other Western cities, having limited flights and road access. After the announcement, 87% of D.C.-based employees left, prompting former lead career BLM official Steve Ellis to state "the bureau lost a tremendous amount of expertise...[of] very seasoned people."

=== Biden administration ===
On September 17, 2021, Secretary Deb Haaland announced that the headquarters would be moved back to Washington, D.C.

Under the Biden administration, the BLM was working on a pilot project called "outcomes-based grazing", to see if cattle grazing can help achieve conservation, agency director Tracy Stone-Manning said in an interview published in April 2022.

In June 2022, the BLM finalized two acquisitions in Colorado and Wyoming, acquiring over 40,000 acres of previously inaccessible land. The acquisition in Wyoming for 35,670 acres is the agency's largest ever purchase in the state.

In August 2022, the Inflation Reduction Act became effective.

In 2024 the Department of the Interior begun to advance a new rule according to which the Bureau of Land Management can distribute restoration leases and mitigation leases exactly in the same way as it distributes new leases for oil and gas drilling. The designed land will be used for nature conservation including use of indigenous knowledge. This policy was repealed in September 2025 under the second Trump administration.

=== Second Trump administration ===
In February 2025, three weeks after the beginning of his second presidency, president Trump nominated Kathleen Sgamma, a petroleum industry lobbyist who contributed to Project 2025, to lead the BLM. Sgamma had previously served as president of the Western Energy Alliance, an association of independent oil and natural gas companies with interests on public lands. Sgamma withdrew her nomination on April 10, just as her confirmation hearing was about to begin. In November 2025, Trump nominated Steve Pearce to be the BLM Director. He was confirmed by the Senate on May 18, 2026, and sworn in on May 20, 2026.

On January 12, 2026, the Department of the Interior established the U.S. Wildland Fire Service within the Office of the Secretary to consolidate wildland fire operations previously administered separately by the BLM, the Bureau of Indian Affairs, the National Park Service and the U.S. Fish and Wildlife Service. The BLM began transferring much of its firefighting capacity and coordination functions to the new service in phases; its Alaska Fire Service also transferred in 2026. The BLM continued to coordinate with the new service on fire management activities and land-use decisions affecting BLM-managed lands.

== Programs ==
Most of the public lands held by the Bureau of Land Management are located in the western states.

- Grazing. The BLM manages livestock grazing on nearly 155 million acres (630,000 km^{2}) million acres under the Taylor Grazing Act of 1934. The agency has granted more than 18,000 permits and leases to ranchers who graze their livestock, mostly cattle and sheep, at least part of the year on BLM public lands.

Permits and leases generally cover a 10-year period and are renewable if the BLM determines that the terms and conditions of the expiring permit or lease are being met. The federal grazing fee is adjusted annually and is calculated using a formula originally set by Congress in the Public Rangelands Improvement Act of 1978.
Under this formula, the grazing fee cannot fall below $1.35 per animal unit month (AUM), nor can any fee increase or decrease exceed 25 percent of the previous year's level. The grazing fee for 2014 was set at $1.35 per AUM, the same level as for 2013.
Over time there has been a gradual decrease in the amount of grazing that takes place on BLM-managed land. Grazing on public lands has declined from 18.2 million AUMs in 1954 to 7.9 million AUMs in 2013.

- Mining. Domestic production from over 63,000 federal onshore oil and gas wells on BLM lands accounts for 11 percent of the natural gas supply and five percent of the oil supply in the United States.

In 2010 BLM had on record a total of 290,000 mining claims under the General Mining Law of 1872. The BLM issues permits for oil and gas, coal, strategic minerals, and renewable energy resources such as wind, geothermal and solar to be developed on public lands. The total mining claims on lands owned by the BLM by 2019 decreased while the number of rejected claims increased. Among the over 3.8 million mining claims overseen by BLM just over 10% of claims were still active, of which Nevada had the most at 203,705 and California had 49,259.

- Coal leases. In 2013, BLM held the coal mineral estate to more than 570 million acres (2,300,000 km^{2}) where the owner of the surface is the federal government, a state or local government, or a private entity. As of 2013, the BLM had competitively granted 309 leases for coal mining to 474,252 acres (191,923 ha), an increase of 13,487 acres (5,458 ha) or nearly 3% increase in land subject to coal production over ten years' time.
- Recreation. In 2013, the BLM administered 205,498 miles (330,717 km) of fishable streams, 2.2 million acres (8,900 km^{2}) of lakes and reservoirs, 6,600 miles (10,600 km) of floatable rivers, over 500 boating access points, 69 National Back Country Byways, and 300 Watchable Wildlife sites. The agency also manages 4,500 miles (7,200 km) of National Scenic, National Historic and National Recreation Trails, as well as thousands of miles of multiple use trails used by motorcyclists, hikers, equestrians, and mountain bikers. In 2013, BLM lands received an estimated 61.7 million recreational visitors. Over 99% of BLM-managed lands are open to hunting, recreational shooting opportunities, and fishing.
- Conservation. The National Landscape Conservation System preserves a variety of lands protected from development.
- California Desert Conservation Area. The California Desert Conservation Area covers 25 million acres (100,000 km^{2}) of land in southern California designated by Congress in 1976 by means of the Federal Land Policy and Management Act. BLM is charged with administering about 10 million acres (40,000 km^{2}) of this fragile area with its potential for multiple uses in mind.
- Timberlands. The Bureau manages 55 million acres (220,000 km^{2}) of forests and woodlands, including 11 million acres (45,000 km^{2}) of commercial forest and 44 million acres (180,000 km^{2}) of woodlands in 11 western states and Alaska. 53 million acres (210,000 km^{2}) are productive forests and woodlands on public domain lands and 2.4 million acres (9,700 km^{2}) are on O&C lands in western Oregon.

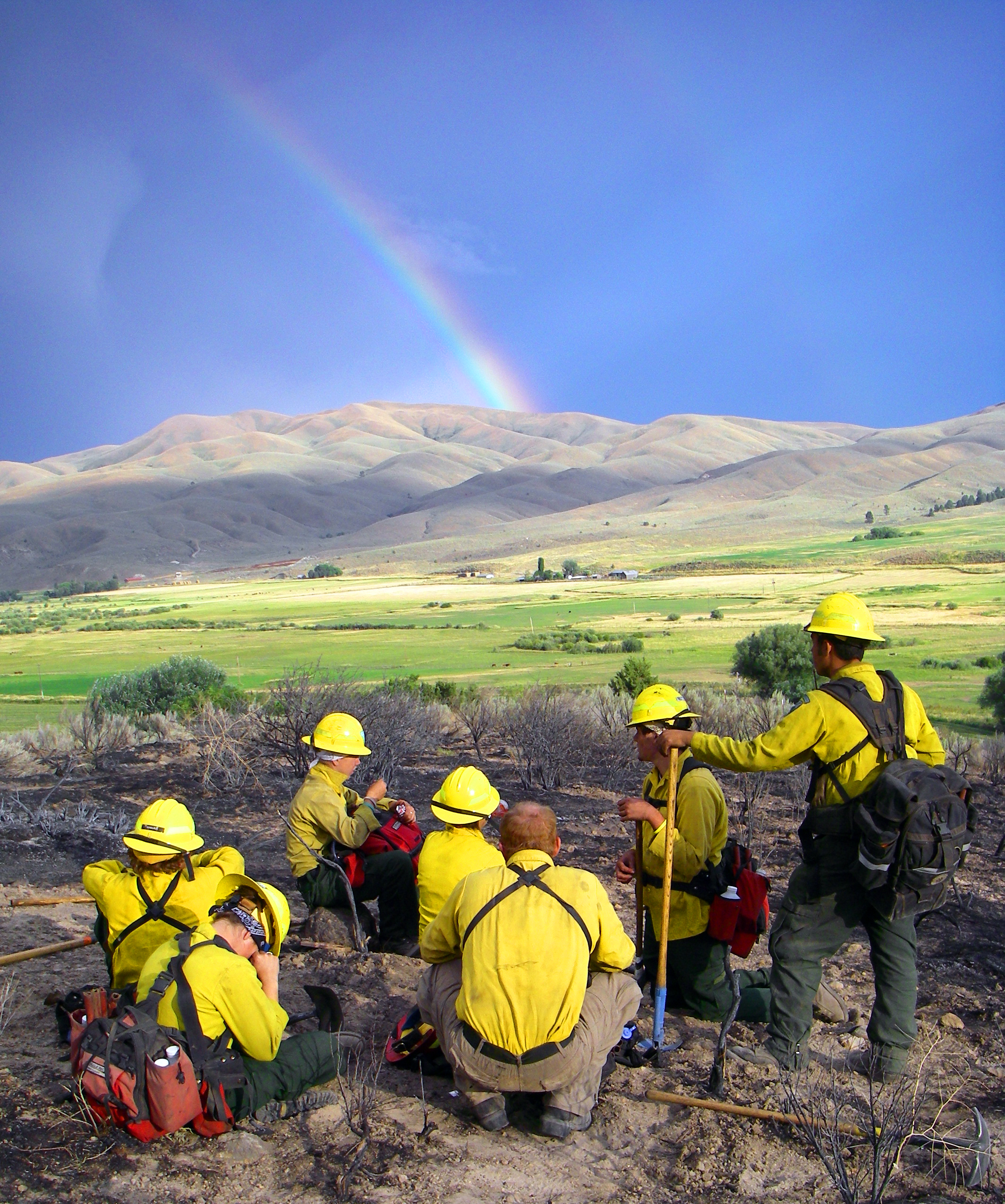
Fatigued BLM Firefighters taking a break after a fire in Oregon in 2008

- Wildland fire management. The BLM formerly maintained its own wildland firefighting program. A 2014 preparedness report listed well over 3,000 full-time equivalent firefighting personnel. In fiscal year 2013, the BLM reported responding to 2,573 fires on lands it administered. In 2026, the Department of the Interior began consolidating the bureau's fire operations under the U.S. Wildland Fire Service, which now provides wildfire response, prevention and other fire services on BLM-managed lands. The transfer of personnel and operations occurred in phases. The BLM and the service continue to coordinate on fire restrictions, prescribed burns and other land-management activities.
- Mineral rights on Indian lands. As part of its trust responsibilities, the BLM provides technical advice for minerals operations on 56 million acres (230,000 km^{2}) of Indian lands.
- Leasing and Land Management of Split Estates. A split estate is similar to the broad form deeds used, starting in the early 1900s. It is a separation of mineral rights and surface rights on a property. The BLM manages split estates, but only in cases when the "surface rights are privately owned and the rights to the minerals are held by the federal government."
- Cadastral surveys. The BLM is the official record keeper for over 200 years' worth of cadastral survey records and plats as part of the Public Land Survey System. In addition, the Bureau still completes numerous new surveys each year, mostly in Alaska, and conducts resurveys to restore obliterated or lost original surveys.
- Abandoned mines. BLM maintains an inventory of known abandoned mines on the lands it manages. As of April 2014, the inventory contained nearly 46,000 sites and 85,000 other features. Approximately 23% of the sites had either been remediated, had reclamation actions planned or underway, or did not require further action. The remaining sites require further investigation. A 2008 Inspector General report alleges that BLM has for decades neglected the dangers represented by these abandoned mines.
- Energy corridors. Approximately 5,000 miles (8,000 km) of energy corridors for pipelines and transmission lines were or are located on BLM-managed lands.
- Helium. BLM operated the National Helium Reserve near Amarillo, Texas, a program begun in 1925 during the time of the Zeppelin Wars. Though the reserve had been set to be moved to private hands, it remains subject to oversight of the BLM under the provisions of the unanimously passed Responsible Helium Administration and Stewardship Act of 2013.
- Revenue and fees. The BLM produces (as of 2013) significant revenue for the United States budget. In 2009, public lands were expected to generate an estimated $6.2 billion in revenues, mostly from energy development. Nearly 43.5% of these funds were provided directly to states and counties to support roads, schools, and other community needs.

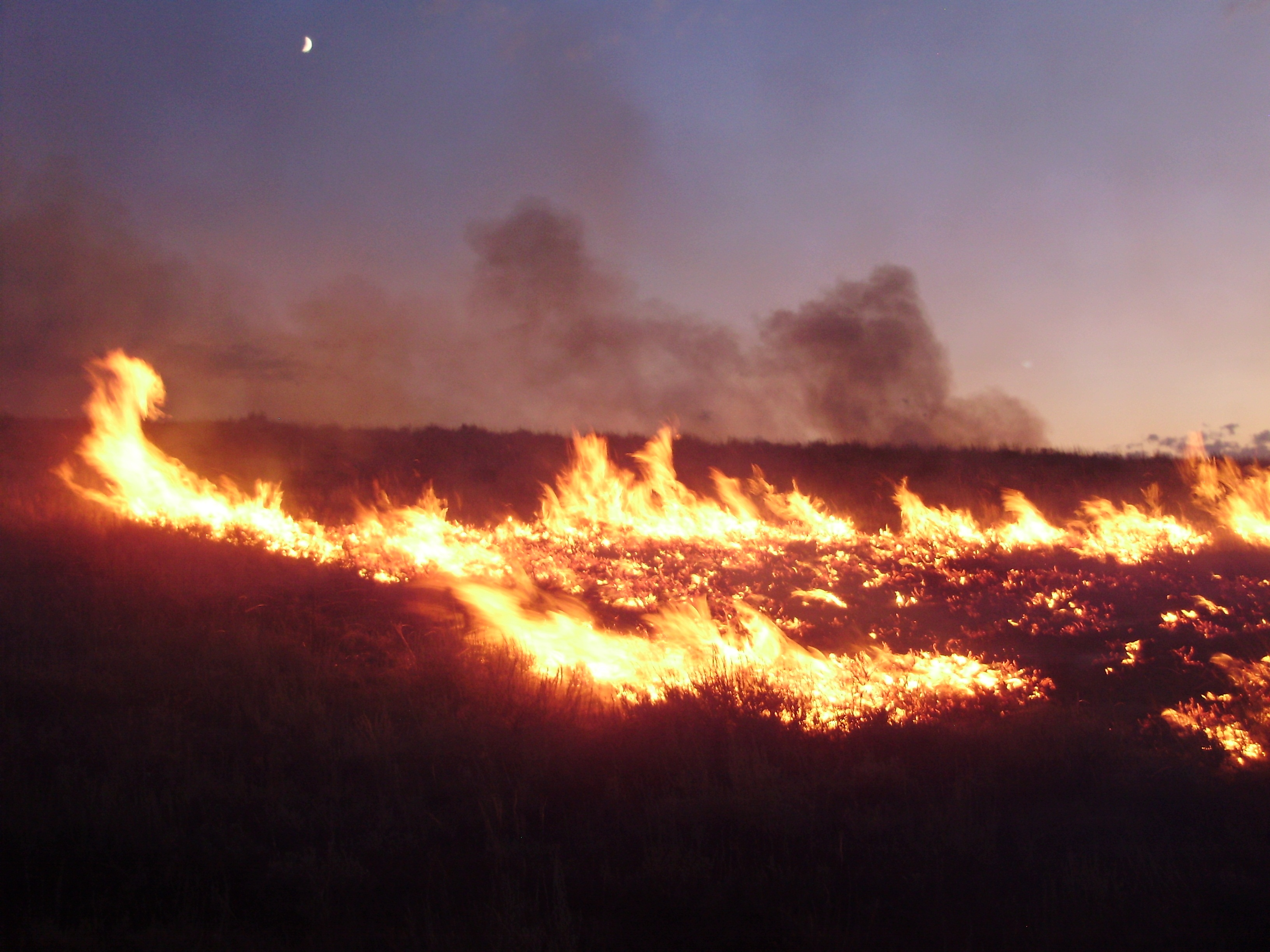
Lightning-sparked wildfires are frequent occurrences on BLM land in Nevada.

== National Conservation Lands ==
Established in 2000, the National Conservation Lands is overseen by the BLM. The National Conservation Lands constitute just about 12% of the lands managed by the BLM. Congress passed Title II of the Omnibus Public Land Management Act of 2009 (Public Law 111-11) to make the system a permanent part of the public lands protection system in the United States. By designating these areas for conservation, the law directed the BLM to ensure these places are protected for future generations, similar to national parks and wildlife refuges.

Category	Unit type	Number	BLM acres	BLM miles
National Conservation Lands	National Monuments	31	13,064,883 acres (52,871.71 km^{2})	
National Conservation Lands	National Conservation Areas	16	3,870,485 acres (15,663.30 km^{2})	
National Conservation Lands	Areas Similar to National Conservation Areas	7	454,723 acres (1,840.20 km^{2}) (Note: This number excludes the National Conservation Lands of the California Desert.)	
Wilderness	Wilderness Areas	263	10,185,931 acres (41,221.00 km^{2})	
Wilderness	Wilderness Study Areas	487	11,118,496 acres (44,994.96 km^{2})	
National Wild and Scenic Rivers	National Wild and Scenic Rivers	81	1,207,694 acres (4,887.36 km^{2})	2,698.8 miles (4,343.3 km)
National Trails System	National Historic Trails	14		5,336 miles (8,587 km)
National Trails System	National Scenic Trails	5		683 miles (1,099 km)
	Totals	904	About 39.5 million acres (160,000 km^{2}) (some units overlap)	8,717 miles (14,029 km)

Source: BLM Resources and Statistics

== Law enforcement and security ==
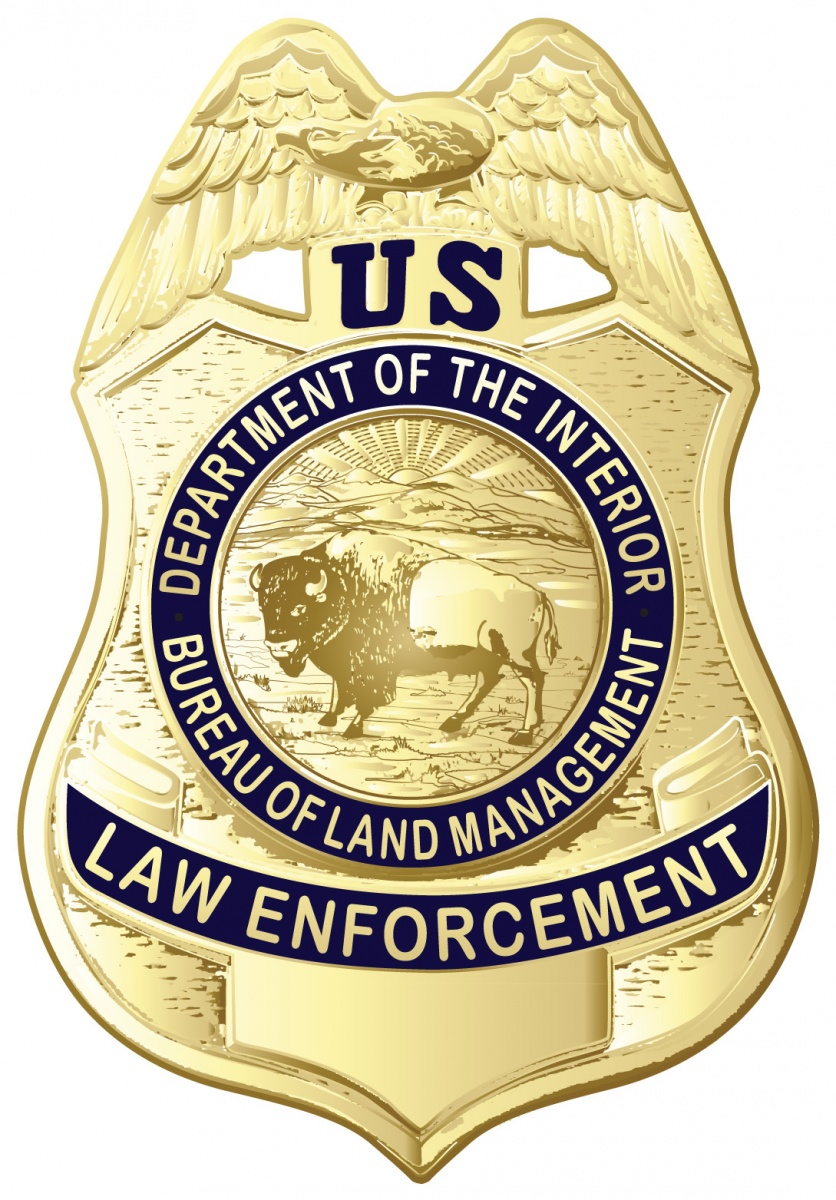
The badge of BLM law enforcement rangers

The BLM, through its Office of Law Enforcement and Security, functions as a federal law enforcement agency of the United States Government. BLM law enforcement rangers and special agents receive their training through Federal Law Enforcement Training Centers (FLETC). Full-time staffing for these positions approaches 300.

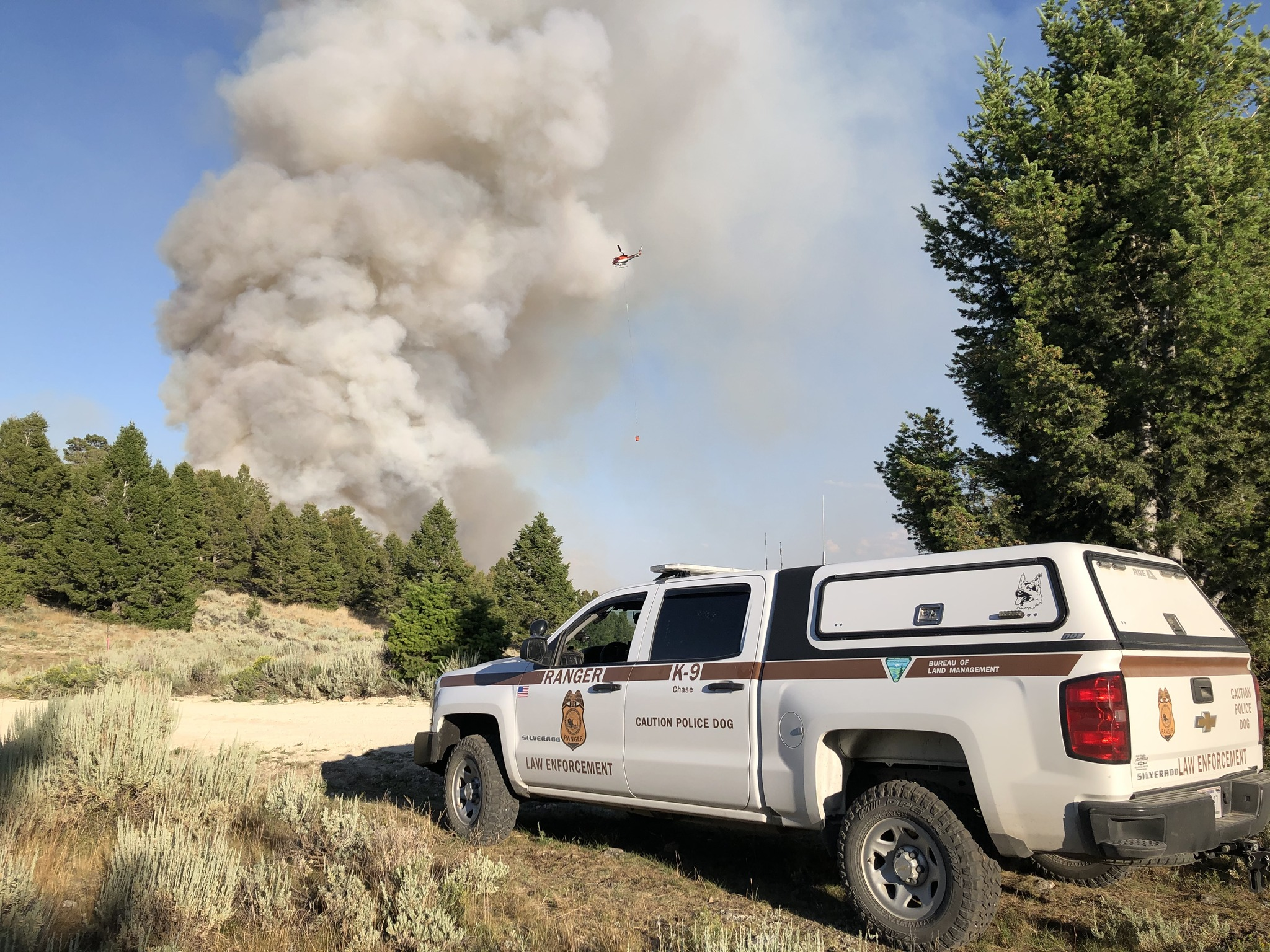
Wildfire being monitored by Bureau of Land Management law enforcement with aerial firefighting support.

Uniformed rangers enforce laws and regulations governing BLM lands and resources. As part of that mission, these BLM rangers carry firearms and defensive equipment, make arrests, execute search warrants, complete reports and testify in court. They seek to establish a regular and recurring presence on a vast amount of public lands, roads and recreation sites. They focus on the protection of natural and cultural resources, other BLM employees and visitors. Given the many locations of BLM public lands, these rangers use canines, helicopters, snowmobiles, dirt bikes and boats to perform their duties.

By contrast BLM special agents are criminal investigators who plan and conduct investigations concerning possible violations of criminal and administrative provisions of the BLM and other statutes under the United States Code. Special agents are normally plain clothes officers who carry concealed firearms and other defensive equipment, make arrests, carry out complex criminal investigations, present cases for prosecution to local United States Attorneys and prepare investigative reports. Criminal investigators occasionally conduct internal and civil claim investigations.

The current sidearm is the SIG Sauer P320 chambered in 9mm which is replacing the SIG Sauer P226/P229 both chambered in .40 S&W.

== Wild horse and burro program ==
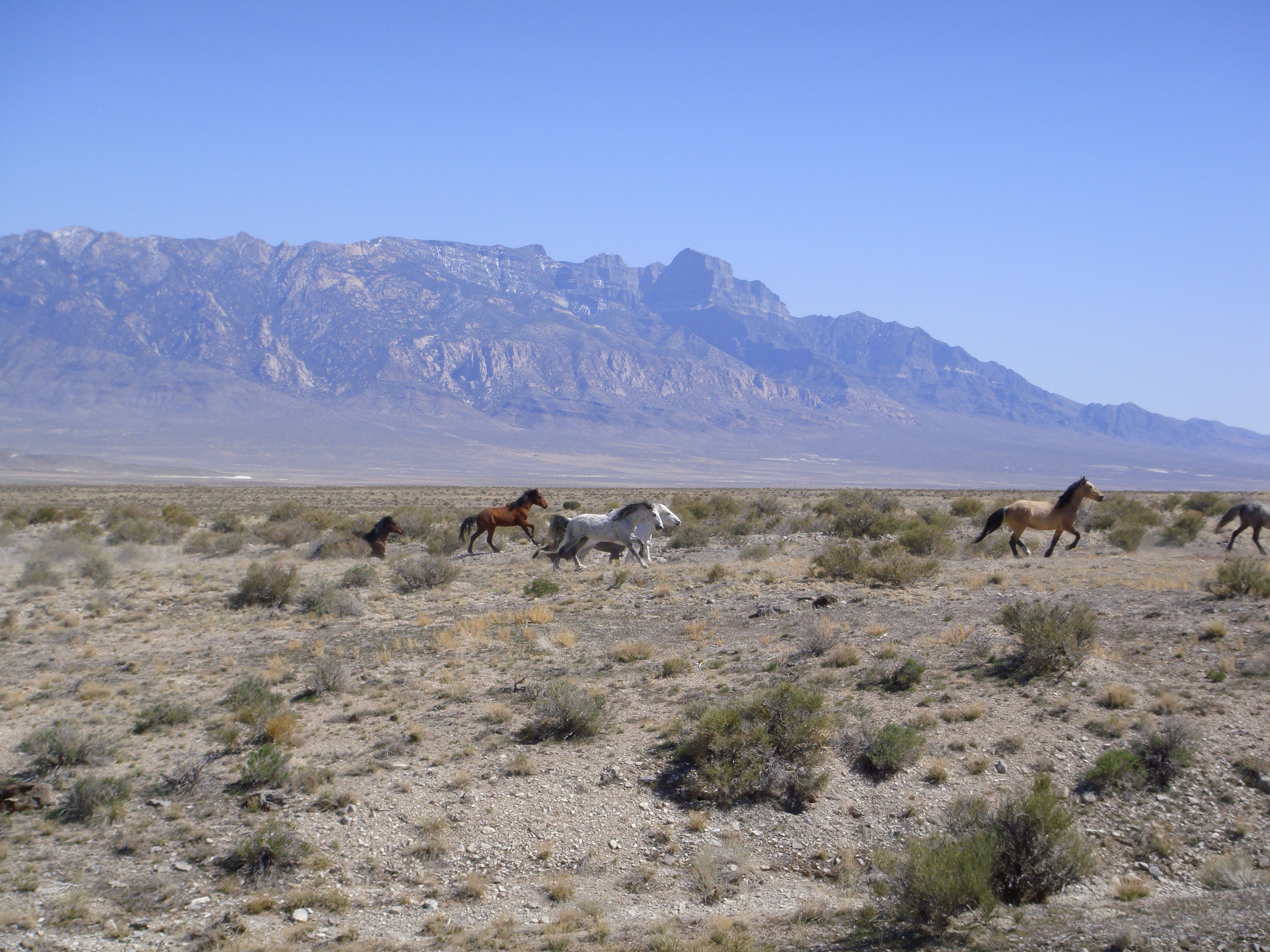
Mustangs run across Tule Valley, Utah

The BLM manages free-roaming horses and burros on public lands in ten western states. Though they are feral, the agency is obligated to protect them under the Wild and Free-Roaming Horses and Burros Act of 1971 (WFRHBA). As the horses have few natural predators, populations have grown substantially. WFRHBA as enacted provides for the removal of excess animals; the killing of lame, old, or sick animals; the private placement or adoption of excess animals; and even the killing of healthy animals if range management required it. The killing of healthy or unhealthy horses has almost never occurred. Pursuant to the Public Rangelands Improvement Act of 1978, the BLM has established 179 "herd management areas" (HMAs) covering 31.6 million acres (128,000 km^{2}) acres where feral horses can be found on federal lands.

In 1973, BLM began a pilot project on the Pryor Mountains Wild Horse Range known as the Adopt-A-Horse initiative. The program took advantage of provisions in the WFRHBA to allow private "qualified" individuals to "adopt" as many horses as they wanted if they could show that they could provide adequate care for the animals. At the time, title to the horses remained permanently with the federal government. The pilot project was so successful that BLM allowed it to go nationwide in 1976. The Adopt-a-Horse program quickly became the primary method of removing excess feral horses from BLM land given the lack of other viable methods. The BLM also uses limited amounts of contraceptives in the herd, in the form of PZP vaccinations; advocates say that additional use of these vaccines would help to diminish the excess number of horses currently under BLM management.

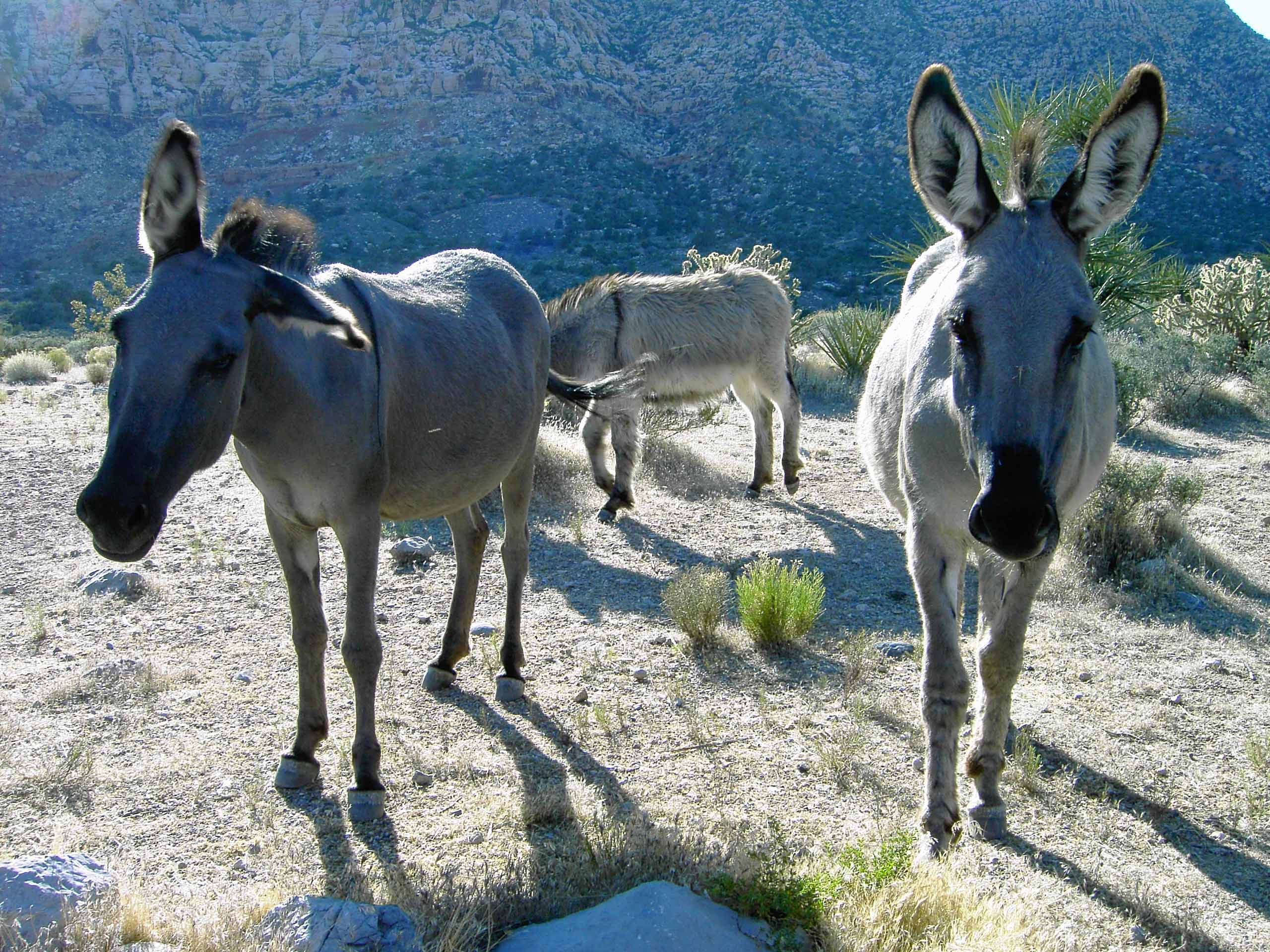
Feral burros in Red Rock Canyon

Despite the early successes of the adoption program, the BLM has struggled to maintain acceptable herd levels, as without natural predators, herd sizes can double every four years. As of 2014, there were more than 49,000 horses and burros on BLM-managed land, exceeding the BLM's estimated "appropriate management level" (AML) by almost 22,500.

The Bureau of Land Management has implemented several programs and has developed partnerships as part of their management plan for preserving wild burros and horses in the United States. There are several herds of horses and burros roaming free on 26.9 million acres of range spread out in ten western states. It is essential to maintain a balance that keeps herd management land and animal population healthy. Some programs and partnerships include the Mustang Heritage Foundation, U.S. Border Patrol, Idaho 4H, Napa Mustang Days and Little Book Cliffs Darting Team. These partnerships help with adoption and animal population as well as education and raising awareness about wild horses and burros.

== Renewable energy ==
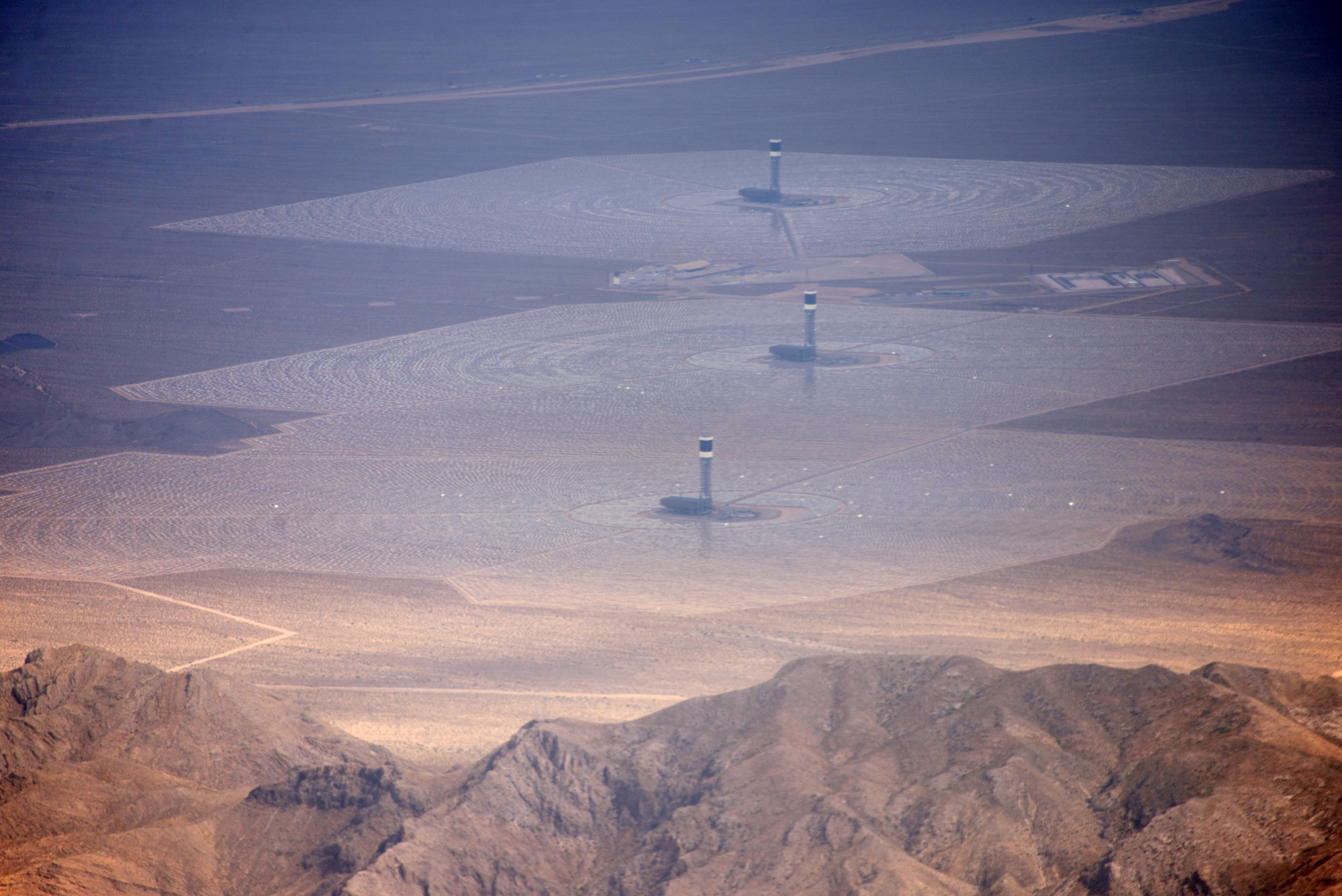
Aerial photograph of Ivanpah Solar Power Facility located on BLM-managed land in the Mojave Desert

In 2009, BLM opened Renewable Energy Coordination Offices in order to approve and oversee wind, solar, biomass, and geothermal projects on BLM-managed lands. The offices were located in the four states where energy companies had shown the greatest interest in renewable energy development: Arizona, California, Nevada, and Wyoming.

- Solar energy. In 2010, BLM approved the first utility-scale solar energy projects on public land. As of 2014, 70 solar energy projects covering 560,000 acres (2,300 km^{2}) had been proposed on public lands managed by BLM primarily located in Arizona, California, and Nevada. To date, it has approved 29 projects that have the potential to generate 8,786 megawatts of renewable energy or enough energy to power roughly 2.6 million homes. The projects range in size from a 45-megawatt photovoltaic system on 422 acres (171 ha) to a 1,000-megawatt parabolic trough system on 7,025 acres (2,843 ha).
- Wind energy. BLM manages 20.6 million acres (83,000 km^{2}) of public lands with wind potential. It has authorized 39 wind energy development projects with a total approved capacity of 5,557 megawatts or enough to supply the power needs of over 1.5 million homes. In addition, BLM has authorized over 100 wind energy testing sites.
- Geothermal energy. BLM manages 59 geothermal leases in producing status, with a total capacity of 1,500 megawatts. This amounts to over 40% of the geothermal energy capacity in the United States.
- Biomass and bioenergy. Its large portfolio of productive timberlands leaves BLM with woody biomass among its line of forest products. The biomass is composed of "smaller diameter materials" and other debris that result from timber production and forest management. Though the use of these materials as a renewable resource is nascent, the agency is engaged in pilot projects to increase the use of its biomass supplies in bioenergy programs.

== Directors ==
Directors of the BLM 1946–present
No.	Image	Director	Term start	Term end	Notes
1		Fred W. Johnson	1946	1948	
2		Marion Clawson	1948	1953	
3		Edward Woosley	1953	1961	
4		Karl Landstrom	1961	1963	
5		Charles Stoddard	1963	1966	
6		Boyd Rasmussen	1966	1971	
7		Burton W. Silcock	1971	1973	
8		Curt Berklund	1973	1977	
9		Frank Gregg	1978	1981	
10		Robert F. Burford	1981	1989	
11		Cy Jamison	1989	1992	
12		Jim Baca	May 19, 1993	February 3, 1994	
Acting		Mike Dombeck	February 4, 1994	January 6, 1997	
acting		Pat Shea	August 1997	October 2, 1997	
13		Pat Shea	October 2, 1997	November 13, 1998	
acting		Tom Fry	November 14, 1998	May 2001	
14		Tom Fry	May 2001	December 2001	
15		Kathleen Clarke	January 2002	December 28, 2006	
acting		James M. Hughes	February 7, 2007	August 7, 2007	
16		James Caswell	August 8, 2007	January 20, 2009	
17		Robert Abbey	August 8, 2009	May 31, 2012	
acting		Mike Pool	June 1, 2012	February 28, 2013	
acting		Neil Kornze	March 1, 2013	April 8, 2014	
18		Neil Kornze	April 8, 2014	January 20, 2017	
acting		Kristin Bail	January 20, 2017	March 14, 2017	
acting		Michael Nedd	March 15, 2017	November 15, 2017	
acting		Brian Steed	November 16, 2017	July 29, 2019	
acting		William Perry Pendley	July 29, 2019	September 25, 2020 (Note: Removed by federal judge on September 25, 2020, after unlawfully serving for 424 days without Senate confirmation, but rejected court order and continued running agency as Deputy Director for Policy and Programs until January 20, 2021.)	
acting		Nada Wolff Culver	February 23, 2021	October 27, 2021	
19		Tracy Stone-Manning	October 27, 2021	January 13, 2025	
acting		Jon Raby	January 28, 2025	June 25, 2025	
acting		Bill Groffy	June 25, 2025	May 21, 2026	
20		Steve Pearce	May 21, 2026	Present	

== See also ==
- Range Improvement Funds
- Rangeland management
- Sagebrush Rebellion
