= Fred W. Johnson =

American government official

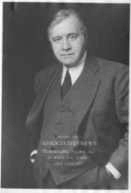

1st Director of the Bureau of Land Management
- In office 1946–1948
- President: Harry S. Truman
- Preceded by: Position created
- Succeeded by: Marion Clawson

Commissioner of the United States General Land Office
- In office May 20, 1933 – July 16, 1946
- President: Franklin D. Roosevelt; Harry S. Truman
- Preceded by: Charles C. Moore
- Succeeded by: Position abolished

Fred W. Johnson was an American government official who served as the first director of the Bureau of Land Management from 1946 to 1948. Johnson had previously served as the final commissioner of the United States General Land Office, from 1933 until 1946.

After the General Land Office was dissolved in 1946, he was selected to serve as the newly created Bureau of Land Management's director by then-Interior Secretary Julius Albert Krug.
