= Marion Clawson =

American economist

R. Marion Clawson
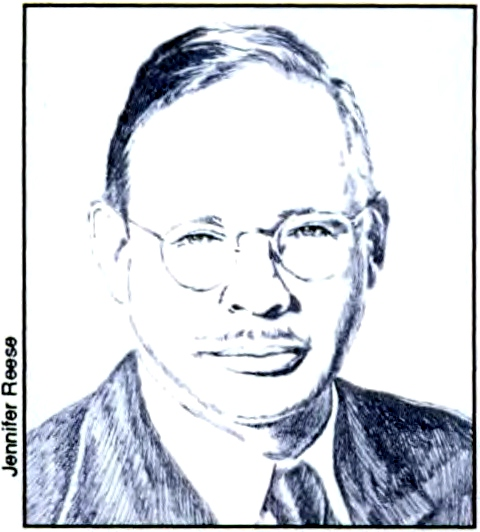

2nd Director of the Bureau of Land Management
- In office 1948–1953
- Preceded by: Fred W. Johnson
- Succeeded by: Edward Woozley

Personal details
- Born: August 10, 1905 Elko, Nevada
- Died: April 12, 1998 (aged 92) Washington, D.C.

Academic background
- Education: University of Nevada; Harvard University
- Doctoral advisor: John D. Black

Academic work
- Discipline: Agricultural economics
- Institutions: United States Department of Agriculture

Robert Marion Clawson (August 10, 1905 – April 12, 1998) was an American agricultural economist. He worked for the United States Department of Agriculture from 1929 to 1946.

In 1948, he became the second director of the Bureau of Land Management, where he served until 1953.

Clawson spent 1953–1955 in Israel as a member of the Economic Advisory Staff, a group of American economists who were invited to Israel by David Ben-Gurion.

He spent the rest of his career at Resources for the Future. During his 20 years at Resources for the Future, Clawson worked on forestry resources and policy. He was active with the organization at the time of his death at age 92.

== Personal life ==
In 1973 Clawson married Nora McGirr Roots, daughter of Ernest McGirr.

== Selected publications ==
- Forests for Whom and for What? OCLC 928005408
- New Deal Planning : The National Resources Planning Board OCLC 864745249
- From Sagebrush to Sage : The Making of a Natural Resource Economist OCLC 7297895
- The Economics of Outdoor Recreation OCLC 898824055
- The Agricultural Potential of the Middle East OCLC 500262553
