= Western Energy Alliance =

Western U.S. fossil fuel trade association

Western Energy Alliance (WEA) is a regional and nonprofit, membership-based organization. It is a trade association that focuses on energy and public land issues in the thirteen-state Intermountain West of the United States. WEA's foundation was laid in 1974 as an Independent Petroleum Association of Mountain States (IPAMS). Western Energy Alliance represents 200 independent natural gas and oil producers, service and supply companies, banking, financial institutions and industry consultants. The headquarter of WEA is in Denver, Colorado.

WEA looks after the benefits of increased domestic natural gas and oil production from the Intermountain West as a way to reduce greenhouse gases and decrease the U.S. dependence on foreign energy. WEA focuses its on federal policy and regulatory interests, including access to federal lands for exploration and production, federal agency permitting, air and water quality, wildlife conservation, health and safety, taxation, and other issues. WEA also provides public and media relations support through a wide variety of media and community outreach efforts.

In January 2021, shortly after Joe Biden assumed office, he paused oil and gas leases on federal lands due to climate change concerns. Denver-based WEA filed a lawsuit to prevent such implementation, claiming it would kill almost 59,000 jobs in 8 western states. Kathleen Sgamma was the president of WEA. Kathleen joined Western Energy Alliance in March 2006. Previously, she spent eleven years in the Information Technology sector, including establishing the European consulting practice and a German subsidiary for a software vendor, and three years as a Military Intelligence Officer in the US Army. She holds a B.S. in Political Science/Defense and Arms Control Studies from the Massachusetts Institute of Technology and an M.S. in Information Technology from Virginia Tech.

== Sources ==
- Independent Petroleum Association of America (IPAA), "Reports & Statistics: Oil & Gas in Your State"
