= Boyd Rasmussen =

Director of the US Bureau of Land Management

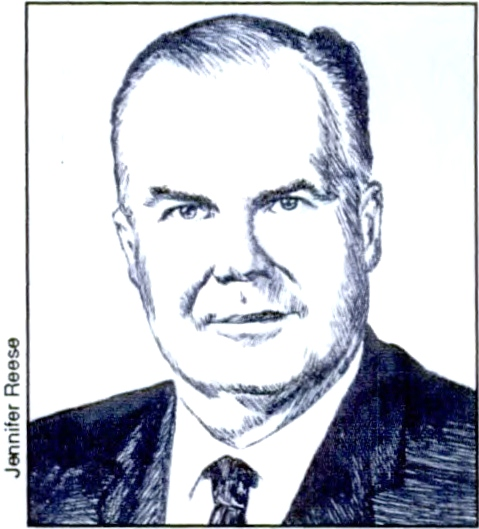

6th Director of the Bureau of Land Management
- In office August 3, 1966 – 1971
- President: Lyndon B. Johnson; Richard Nixon
- Preceded by: Charles Stoddard
- Succeeded by: Burton W. Silcock

Personal details
- Born: April 19, 1913 Glenns Ferry, Idaho
- Died: August 7, 1998 (aged 85) Wilsonville, Oregon
- Party: Democratic

Boyd Rasmussen (April 19, 1913 – August 7, 1998) was an American administrator who served as the Director of the Bureau of Land Management from 1966 to 1971.
