= Kathleen Clarke (U.S. official) =

First female Bureau of Land Management director

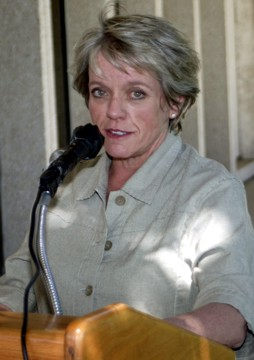

Director of the Bureau of Land Management
- In office December 2001 – December 26, 2006
- President: George W. Bush
- Preceded by: Tom Fry
- Succeeded by: James Caswell

Personal details
- Born: Utah
- Children: 4
- Parent: Hubert C. Burton (1924-2000) (father)
- Education: Utah State University
- Known for: First woman director of the Bureau of Land Management

Kathleen Burton Clarke is an American politician, who served as the national director of the United States Bureau of Land Management from 2001 to 2006. Clarke was the first woman to serve in this role.

== Early life and education ==
Clarke was born in Utah and grew up in Bountiful, Utah. Clarke's father was Hubert C. Burton (1924–2000), a medical doctor. Clarke's mother was Elaine Nelson Burton.

Clarke earned a bachelor's degree from Utah State University. She was then a law student at the J. Reuben Clark Law School at Brigham Young University.

== Career ==
Clarke began her career as a staffer for James V. Hansen and Senator Wallace F. Bennett.

In 1993, she served as the deputy director of Utah Department of Natural Resources. In 1998, she became as the executive director of the Utah Department of Natural Resources.

In 2001, Clarke was nominated by President George Bush to become a director of Bureau of Land Management (BLM) at the Department of Interior and she was confirmed by the U.S. Senate on December 20, 2001. She became the first woman director of BLM.

During her directing of the BLM, it was often criticized by the Sierra Club and other environmental groups for allowing oil drilling at low cost. This action increased domestic oil production and decreased oil production costs, thus keeping the rise in fuel costs below what it otherwise might have been.

Clarke sought to increase energy resource development on public lands. She was criticized for policies that resulted in the slaughtering of many wild horses.

She resigned as director of BLM in December 2006.

Clarke later served as Deputy Commissioner of the Utah Department of Agriculture and Food.

== Personal life ==
Clarke has four children and is a member of the Church of Jesus Christ of Latter-day Saints.

== Awards ==
- 2004 Key Women in Energy – Americas award.

== See also ==
- Gale Norton, 48th (United States Secretary of the Interior)

== Additional sources ==
- Brenner, Noah. "Gas fields win praise". Jackson Hole Daily. Archived from the original on 2006-10-16.
