= United States General Land Office =

United States government agency (1812–1946)

General Land Office
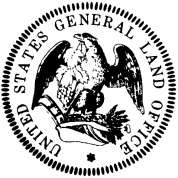

Agency overview
- Formed: 1812
- Dissolved: 1946
- Jurisdiction: Federal government
- Parent department: U.S. Department of the Interior

The General Land Office (GLO) was an independent agency of the United States government responsible for public domain lands in the United States. It was created in 1812 to take over functions previously conducted by the United States Department of the Treasury. Starting with the enactment of the Land Ordinance of 1785, which created the Public Land Survey System, the Treasury Department had already overseen the survey of the Northwest Territory, including what is now the state of Ohio.

Placed under the Department of the Interior when that department was formed in 1849, it was merged with the United States Grazing Service (established in 1934) to become the Bureau of Land Management on July 16, 1946.

== History ==
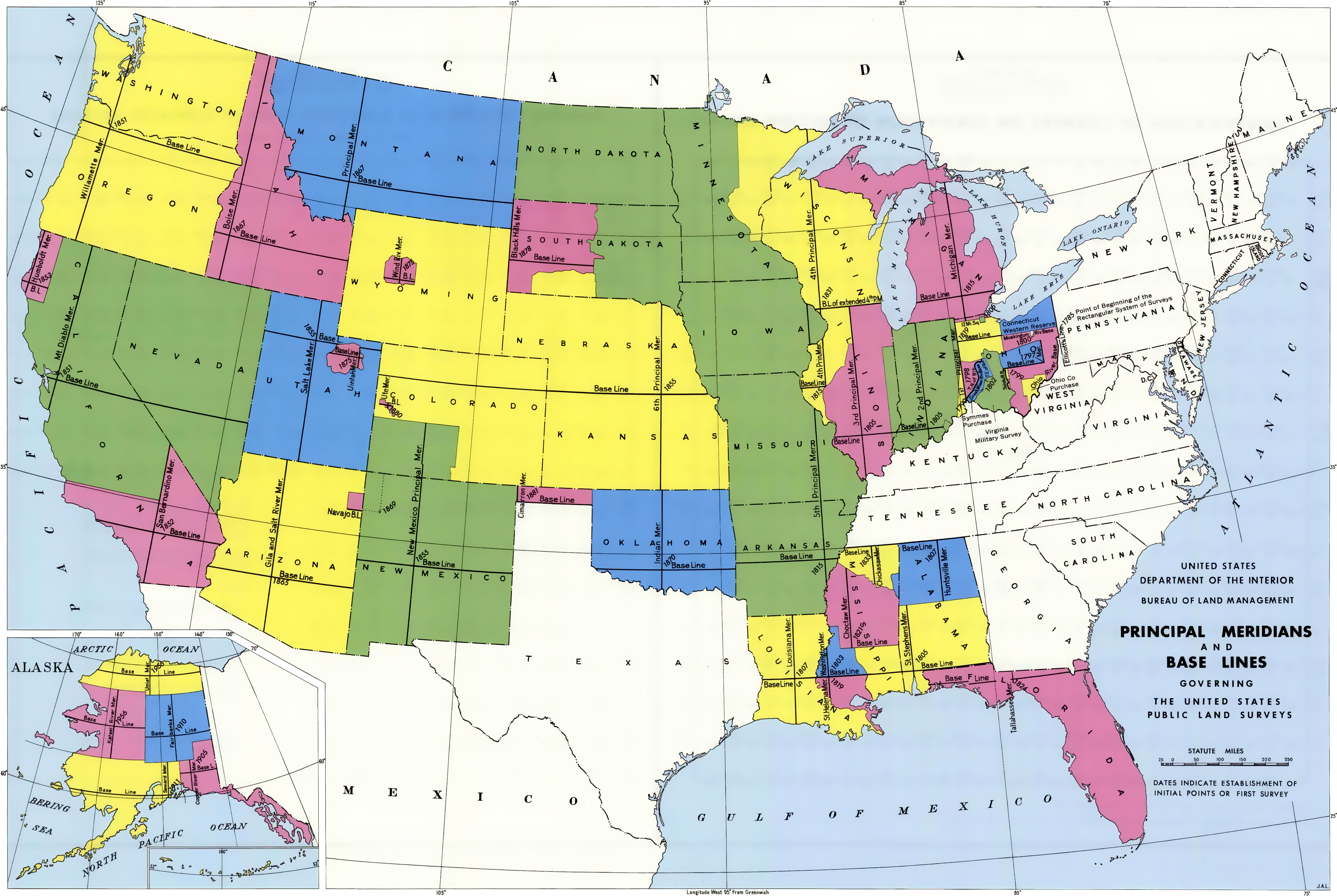
This Bureau of Land Management map depicts the public domain lands surveyed and platted under the auspices of the GLO to facilitate the sale of those lands.

The GLO oversaw the surveying, platting, and sale of the public lands in the Western United States and administered the Homestead Act and the Preemption Act in disposal of public lands. The frantic pace of public land sales in the 19th century American West led to the idiomatic expression "land-office business", meaning a thriving or high-volume trade.

For most of the active period of public land settlement, district land offices were the basic operating units that conducted the business of transferring title. All transactions relative to the disposal of public land within a declared land district were handled through its land office by officials designated as registers, who recorded land applications, and receivers, who accepted payments for land and issued receipts. The position of receiver was abolished, July 1, 1925, and the functions devolved upon the register, whose title was changed to "manager" in 1946. The first of 362 district land offices was opened at Steubenville, Ohio, on July 2, 1800; the last at Newcastle, Wyoming, on March 1, 1920. The peak year for land offices was 1890, with 123 in operation. The subsequent closing of the public domain gradually reduced the number of land offices, until, in 1933, only 25 offices remained.

The GLO was placed under the secretary of the interior when the Department of the Interior was formed in 1849. Reacting to public concerns about forest conservation, Congress in 1891 authorized the president to withdraw timber lands from disposal. Grover Cleveland then created 17 forest reserves of nearly 18,000,000 acres (73,000 km^{2}), which were initially managed by the GLO. In 1905, Congress transferred responsibility for these reserves to the newly created Forest Service, under the Department of Agriculture.

Beginning in the early 20th century, the GLO shifted from a primary function of land sales to issuing leases and collecting grazing fees for livestock raised on public lands, and royalties from minerals off lands recently withdrawn from disposal under the Withdrawal Act of 1910, as well as other custodial duties. Thus, beginning around 1900, the GLO gained a focus for conservation of renewable public resources, as well as for their exploitation.

On July 16, 1946, the GLO was merged with the United States Grazing Service (established in 1934 under the Taylor Grazing Act) to become the Bureau of Land Management (BLM), an agency of the Interior Department responsible for administering the remaining 264,000,000 acres (1,070,000 km^{2}) of public lands still in federal ownership.

An early commissioner was John McLean, later an associate justice of the Supreme Court of the United States.

The BLM makes images of GLO records (federal land patents, survey plats and field notes, land status records, and tract books) issued between 1787 and present publicly available on its website. Since 1990, the BLM's Geographic Coordinates Database (GCDB) program has endeavored to generate coordinate values for each established PLSS corner using the official survey records of the GLO and BLM on a township basis. The GCDB data are available for download by the public in GIS shapefile format from the GeoCommunicator Land Survey Information System website. The GCDB coordinates are also available to the public in the GCDB flat file and GCDB coverage formats via the National Operations Center website.

== Gallery ==
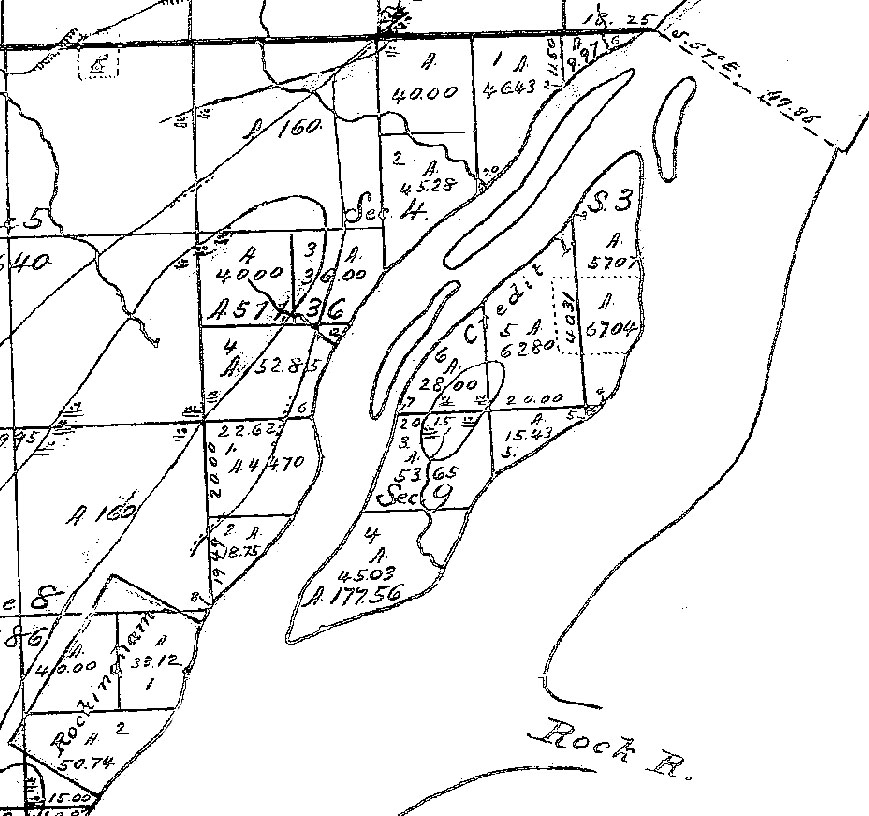
Example of a portion of an 1838 GLO map, Credit Island, now Davenport, Iowa

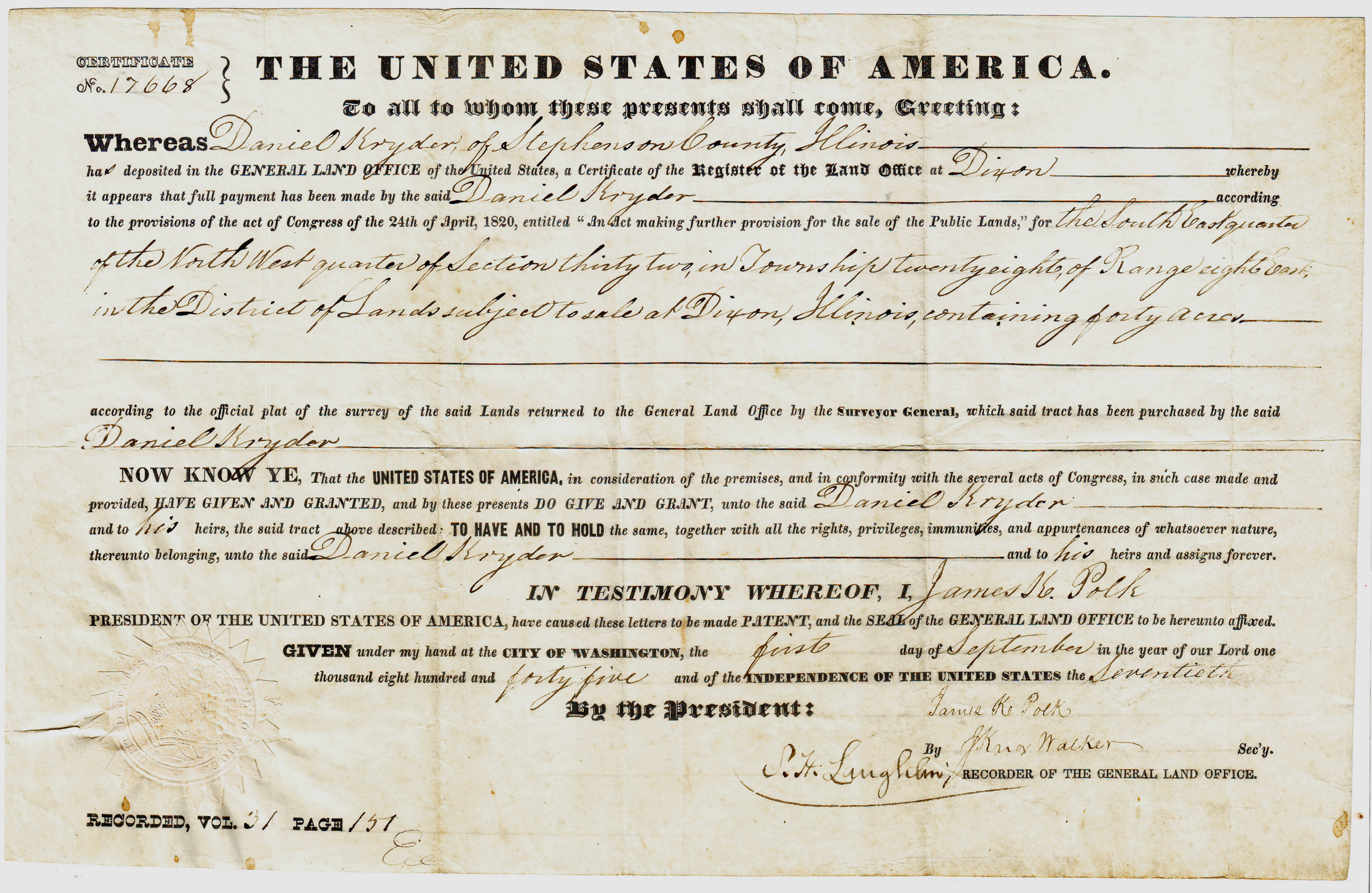
An 1845 GLO land patent

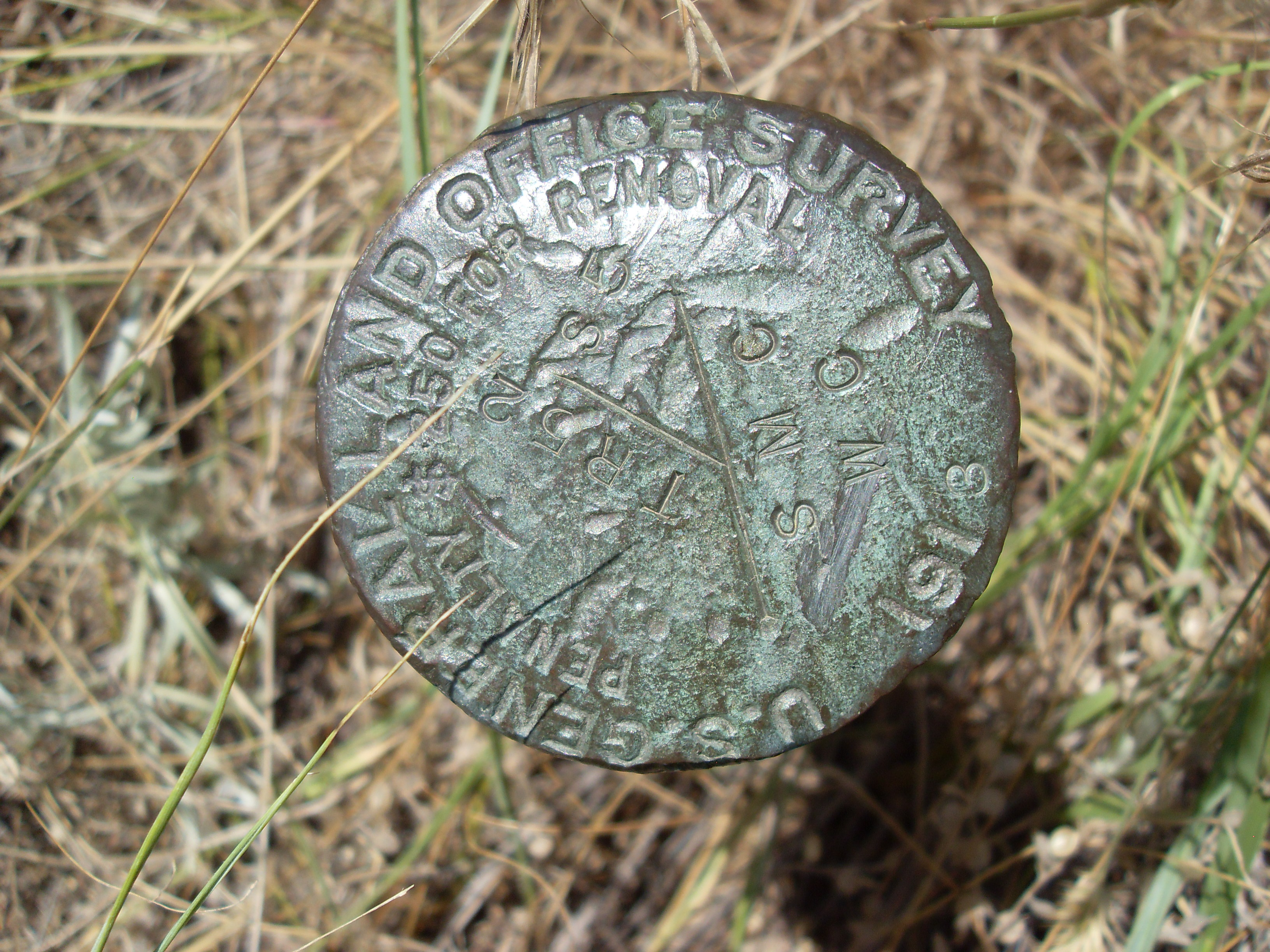
A GLO survey marker from 1913 in Douglas, Wyoming

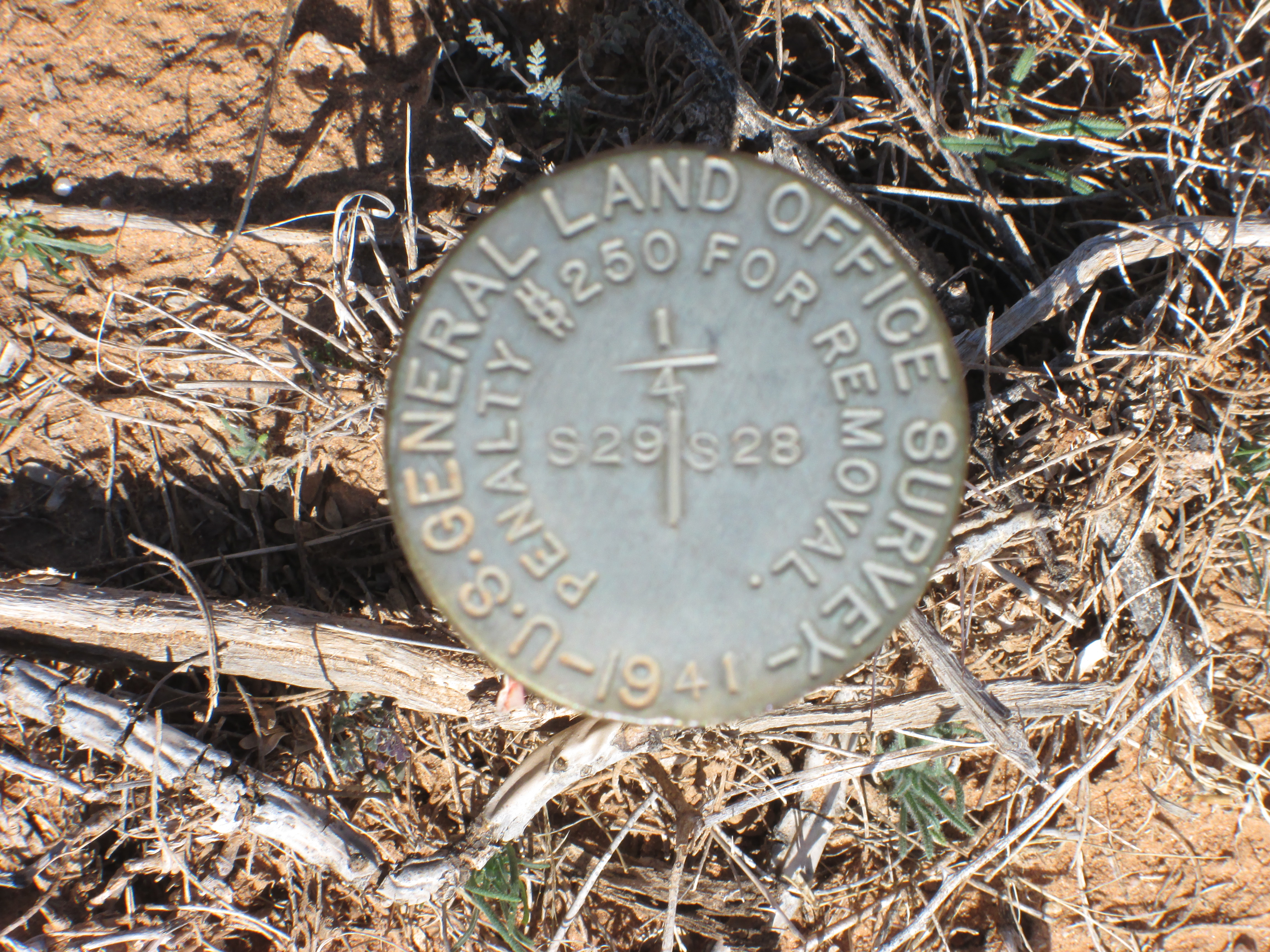
GLO marker from 1941 near Sahuarita, Arizona

== See also ==
- List of commissioners of the General Land Office
- Beginning Point of the U.S. Public Land Survey
- Beginning Point of the Louisiana Purchase Survey
- National Irrigation Congress
