= Public Rangelands Improvement Act of 1978 =

- Long title: An Act to improve the range conditions of the public grazing lands.
- Acronyms (colloquial): PRIA
- Nicknames: Public Grazing Lands Improvement Act of 1978
- Enacted by: the 95th United States Congress
- Effective: October 25, 1978

Citations
- Public law: 95-514
- Statutes at Large: 92 Stat. 1803

Codification
- Titles amended: 43 U.S.C.: Public Lands
- U.S.C. sections created: 43 U.S.C. ch. 37 § 1901 et seq.

Legislative history
- Introduced in the House as H.R. 10587 by Teno Roncalio (D–WY) on January 26, 1978; Committee consideration by House Interior and Insular Affairs, Senate Energy and Natural Resources; Passed the House on June 29, 1978 (Passed); Passed the Senate on September 30, 1978 (59-7); Reported by the joint conference committee on October 6, 1978; agreed to by the House on October 10, 1978 (Agreed) and by the Senate on October 11, 1978 (Agreed); Signed into law by President Jimmy E. Carter on October 25, 1978

The Public Rangelands Improvement Act of 1978 (PRIA) (Pub. L. 95–514) defines the current grazing fee formula and establishes rangeland monitoring and inventory procedures for Bureau of Land Management and United States Forest Service rangelands. The National Grasslands are exempt from PRIA.

The H.R. 10587 legislation was passed by the 95th U.S. Congressional session and enacted into law by the 39th President of the United States Jimmy Carter on October 25, 1978.
