= United States Grazing Service =

Former U.S. Federal Government Agency

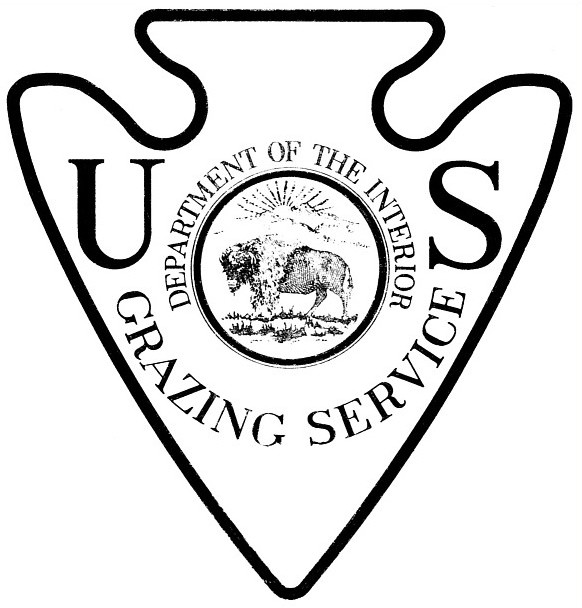

The United States Grazing Service (USGS) was established in 1934 as part of the Taylor Grazing Act. This act was designed to control the destruction of public land due to overgrazing, which had become a problem across western states like Colorado, Wyoming and Montana. The USGS oversees grazing on these lands and regulates the amount of livestock that can be grazed to ensure that the land remains healthy and productive. The USGS also serves as an advocate for ranchers, helping them access permits, utilize water rights, comply with local regulations, and even negotiate grazing leases on public lands.

== History ==
When the Taylor Grazing Act was passed in 1934 by the United States Congress, an office under the Department of the Interior was also created to manage the act. It was first called the Division of Grazing, but later was renamed the U.S. Grazing Service in 1939. Its responsibilities were to enforce the act, which leased public lands to farmers and ranchers for grazing.

The Grazing Service encountered multiple problems, such as very low fees to lease land, which could not be raised due to opposition from farmers, budget reductions enacted by Congress, or unlawful use of the lands. Hoping to better control improper use of the lands, the Grazing Service moved its headquarters from Washington, D.C. to Salt Lake City, Utah.

With so much conflict surrounding the Grazing Service, Secretary of the Interior Ickes combined the Grazing Service and the General Land Office to form the Bureau of Land Management (BLM) in 1946. The BLM was given the responsibilities of the former U.S. Grazing Service and General Land Office.

The BLM retained control of its laws until 1976. In that year, Congress passed the Federal Land Policy and Management Act (FLPMA). The FLPMA removed the responsibilities of the former General Land Office. It also changed fees and some regulations in the BLM's other set of responsibilities, which had been owned by the Grazing Service, and that are still used today.

== Directors of Grazing ==
Farrington R. Carpenter

- Farrington R. Carpenter (1934–1938)
- Richard H. Rutledge (1939–1944)
- Clarence L. Forsling (1944–1946)
