= U.S. Wildland Fire Service =

Wildland fire management service of the United States Department of the Interior

Agency overview
- Formed: January 12, 2026
- Jurisdiction: United States
- Headquarters: Washington, D.C., and Boise, Idaho
- Employees: 5,780 federal wildland fire personnel annually (departmental figure)
- Agency executive: Brian Fennessy, Director
- Parent agency: United States Department of the Interior (Office of the Secretary)
- Website: www.doi.gov/wildlandfireservice

The U.S. Wildland Fire Service (USWFS) is a wildland fire management service within the United States Department of the Interior. Established on January 12, 2026, it brought together fire management functions previously administered by the Bureau of Indian Affairs, Bureau of Land Management, National Park Service, and United States Fish and Wildlife Service, as well as the department's Office of Wildland Fire and Office of Aviation Services. Its responsibilities include wildfire suppression, hazardous-fuels reduction, prescribed burning, fire preparedness, and rehabilitation of burned areas on more than 500 million acres (200 million hectares) of Interior-administered and tribal lands.

The service was established by an Interior Department order following Executive Order 14308, issued by President Donald Trump in June 2025, and a departmental reorganization directive issued that September. Brian Fennessy, previously chief of California's Orange County Fire Authority, was appointed its first director. The reorganization was designed to establish a single chain of command for Interior's fire programs; the transfer of personnel, assets, and administrative functions was planned in phases.

The Trump administration also proposed transferring the United States Forest Service's fire management program from the United States Department of Agriculture to the new service. Congress retained separate Interior and Forest Service wildfire appropriations for fiscal year 2026, however, and a House committee's proposed fiscal year 2027 appropriations likewise kept the two programs separate. The USWFS and Forest Service therefore continued to work as distinct organizations through existing interagency arrangements.

== History ==
=== Predecessor programs ===
Before the creation of the USWFS, the Interior Department's four principal land-management bureaus administered separate wildfire programs, while participating in national interagency arrangements with the Forest Service and other firefighting organizations. The 1988 Yellowstone fires prompted renewed attention to fire-management planning and coordination. In 1992, Interior established a department-wide fire coordinator position and a wildland fire fund administered through the Bureau of Land Management. The Interior and Agriculture departments adopted a federal wildland fire policy in 1995.

Interior established the Office of Wildland Fire Coordination in 2001 to oversee fire-program budgets and policy across its bureaus. The office received centralized authority over Interior's wildland fire budget in 2008 and was renamed the Office of Wildland Fire in 2012. Its work remained distinct from that of the National Interagency Fire Center (NIFC) in Boise, an interagency coordination center through which participating federal agencies organize shared resources for wildland fires.

=== Establishment and transition ===
On June 12, 2025, Trump signed Executive Order 14308, directing the secretaries of the interior and agriculture to pursue changes to federal wildfire prevention and response, including proposals to consolidate their wildfire programs. On September 10, Secretary of the Interior Doug Burgum signed Secretary's Order 3443, directing Interior's bureaus and fire offices to develop a plan for unifying the department's programs under a U.S. Wildland Fire Service. The department held consultation sessions with tribal governments in November 2025 concerning the planned organization and the provision of wildfire services on tribal lands.

Secretary's Order 3448 formally established the USWFS within the Office of the Secretary on January 12, 2026. The order placed the directors of the bureaus' fire programs, the Office of Wildland Fire, and the Office of Aviation Services under the new director and directed the subsequent realignment of other personnel. It delegated Interior's wildfire operational authority to the director while temporarily preserving some overlapping bureau authorities to maintain continuity during the transition. Fennessy was selected to direct the service after serving as fire chief of the Orange County Fire Authority and, earlier, the San Diego Fire-Rescue Department.

The transfer of personnel and management functions continued through the 2026 fire season. Interim policies defined the division of responsibilities between the new service and Interior land-management bureaus. A May memorandum directed geographic-area chiefs to appoint interim chiefs and deputy chiefs for local units, while a September memorandum addressed the establishment of units in each geographic area.

=== Proposed consolidation with the Forest Service ===
The administration's original proposal went beyond consolidating Interior's existing programs. Its fiscal year 2026 budget request proposed a combined federal wildland fire service incorporating the Forest Service's firefighting program. Congress did not enact that proposed transfer: the fiscal year 2026 appropriations law retained separate Interior and Forest Service wildfire management accounts, with combined appropriations of $6.42 billion, including funding made available under a special wildfire-suppression spending adjustment.

The administration renewed the cross-departmental consolidation proposal in its fiscal year 2027 budget request, seeking $6.91 billion for a combined service responsible for fire management on approximately 700 million acres (280 million hectares). In June 2026, the House Appropriations Committee instead reported a bill proposing approximately $1.54 billion for the Interior-based USWFS and $5.20 billion for the Forest Service's separate fire program. The committee supported unification of Interior's activities but called for further consideration of any merger with the Forest Service. These figures represented a presidential request and a committee proposal, respectively, rather than enacted fiscal year 2027 appropriations.

== Organization and workforce ==
The USWFS is a departmental service rather than a separate cabinet-level department. Its director is appointed by and reports to the secretary of the interior or the secretary's designee. It maintains offices in Washington, D.C., and Boise, Idaho, with operational personnel assigned throughout Interior-administered and tribal lands. The organizational structure comprises a national headquarters, geographic areas led by geographic-area fire chiefs, and local units. The geographic-area chiefs were directed to establish interim unit-level chains of command during the 2026 transition.

The department reports that the USWFS employs 5,780 federal wildland fire personnel annually and supports approximately 900 tribal wildland fire personnel. The latter figure describes personnel supported through tribal fire programs and should not be interpreted as an additional number of direct federal employees. The service's establishment order described its predecessor workforce as comprising more than 4,000 permanent employees and thousands of seasonal workers.

The service coordinates with land managers in the Bureau of Indian Affairs, Bureau of Land Management, National Park Service, and Fish and Wildlife Service. These bureaus continue to manage their respective lands, while the USWFS exercises transferred wildfire operational responsibilities. Its establishment order also requires the service to maintain Interior's treaty and trust responsibilities to tribal nations.

== Responsibilities ==
=== Fire suppression and incident response ===
The USWFS responds to wildfires affecting Interior-administered and tribal lands and participates in incidents that cross federal, state, tribal, or local boundaries. Its crews use engines, hand crews, heavy equipment, helicopters, and fixed-wing aircraft, with tactics that include applying water or retardant, constructing firelines, and conducting carefully planned tactical burns. The service works with other agencies to mobilize personnel and equipment during large or complex incidents.

The service participates in the existing national interagency wildfire system alongside the Forest Service, tribal organizations, and state and local fire agencies. NIFC, which coordinates resources through its participating organizations, is an interagency institution and is not a subordinate unit of the USWFS.

=== Prevention and hazardous-fuels management ===
A Bureau of Land Management firefighter carries out prescribed burning in Arizona in November 2025, before the establishment of the USWFS.

The service undertakes hazardous-fuels projects intended to reduce the intensity or spread of future wildfires, particularly around communities and infrastructure. Its methods include prescribed burning, mechanical thinning, the manual removal of vegetation, fuel breaks, managed grazing, and treatment of invasive plants. Projects may be designed to protect structures in the wildland–urban interface or maintain fire-adapted ecosystems. The service also supports community-based wildfire risk reduction.

=== Post-fire rehabilitation ===
After wildfires, the service conducts emergency stabilization and longer-term burned-area rehabilitation. Immediate projects can include erosion controls, drainage work, closure of unsafe roads and trails, and protection of watersheds. Longer-term work can involve restoring native vegetation, limiting invasive species, repairing damaged facilities, and monitoring ecosystem recovery. Such projects are undertaken with specialists from Interior's land-management bureaus and scientific agencies and, where appropriate, the Forest Service.

=== Aviation and research ===
The establishment of the USWFS included the realignment of Interior's Office of Aviation Services, which had provided department-wide aircraft services, safety oversight, and support for wildfire operations. Aircraft may be used for reconnaissance, transportation, water and retardant delivery, and other incident functions. The service also participates in interagency wildfire science; in July 2026 it announced approximately $9 million in available research funding through the Joint Fire Science Program.

== Reorganization and policy debate ==
=== Congressional oversight and land management ===
The departmental consolidation prompted questions about congressional oversight, funding, and the relationship between wildfire operations and the agencies responsible for managing the land where fires occur. In March 2026, E&E News reported objections from some Democratic lawmakers, including Representative Chellie Pingree, who questioned the budgetary and operational implications of transferring employees between agencies. Former Bureau of Land Management director Tracy Stone-Manning and some federal firefighters raised concerns that separating firefighters from land-management personnel could weaken coordination over local ecological and resource-management decisions.

The Interior Department responded that it was implementing the consolidation in phases, coordinating with Congress, and maintaining wildfire response capabilities during the transition. Fennessy told employees that their day-to-day firefighting duties would continue while the new organization was developed. Grassroots Wildland Firefighters cofounder Luke Mayfield expressed support for the longer-term potential of consolidation while acknowledging that substantial implementation work remained.

=== Wildfire suppression policy ===
A separate debate concerned the service's approach to naturally ignited wildfires. In February 2026, Fennessy described suppression as the organization's primary mission while stating that it would continue mitigation and other existing fire-management responsibilities. In July, the Associated Press reported that, under a direction from Burgum, federal officials said the USWFS would pursue full suppression of every wildfire under its management. Officials said their objective was to protect lives and property and that incident managers retained discretion to choose safe and effective tactics for individual fires.

Some wildfire researchers and former federal officials disputed the broader full-suppression approach, arguing that fire can serve an ecological function and that suppressing all naturally occurring fires can contribute to the accumulation of combustible vegetation. They also questioned the risks of committing firefighters to remote fires that posed little immediate threat to settlements or infrastructure. The service continued to describe prescribed burning and other fuels treatments as components of its prevention program.

The debate received renewed attention after a June 27, 2026, burnover during the Knowles Fire in western Colorado that ultimately killed four federal wildland firefighters, including personnel from the USWFS and Forest Service. The Associated Press reported that authorities had not disclosed sufficient information about the incident to determine the firefighters' assignment or its relationship, if any, to the new suppression policy. The service and Forest Service subsequently reported the deaths, including that of USWFS firefighter Nathan Matthews, who died from his injuries in July.

== See also ==
- National Interagency Fire Center
- National Wildfire Coordinating Group
- United States Forest Service
- Wildland firefighting
- Wildfires in the United States
