= Karl Landstrom =

American government official (1909–2013)

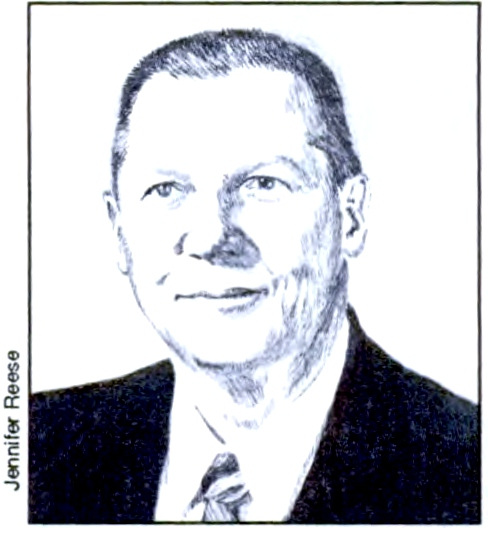

4th Director of the Bureau of Land Management
- In office 1961–1963
- President: John F. Kennedy
- Preceded by: Edward Woosley
- Succeeded by: Charles Stoddard

Personal details
- Born: February 12, 1909 Lebanon, Oregon
- Died: January 27, 2013 (aged 103) Ozark, Alabama
- Party: Democratic

Karl Landstrom (February 12, 1909 – January 27, 2013) was an American attorney and government official who served as the Director of the Bureau of Land Management from 1961 to 1963.

He died on January 27, 2013, aged 103, in Ozark, Alabama.
