= Range Improvement Funds =

Range Improvement Funds are money collected from livestock grazing on United States federal lands and used for rangeland improvements. The Bureau of Land Management calls these funds Range Improvement Funds and uses them solely for labor, materials, and final survey and design of projects to improve rangelands. The Forest Service calls these funds Range Betterment Funds and uses them for planning and building rangeland improvements.
