= Kathleen Sgamma =

American oil executive (born 1967)

Nominee for Director of the Bureau of Land Management
- Withdrawn
- In office February 11, 2025 – April 10, 2025
- President: Donald Trump
- Interior Secretary: Doug Burgum

Personal details
- Born: May 29, 1967 (age 59)
- Party: Republican
- Education: Massachusetts Institute of Technology (BS); Virginia Tech (MS)
- Occupation: Executive

Kathleen Sgamma is an American oil industry executive. She was the nominee from February to April 10, 2025 to be director of the US Bureau of Land Management during the second Trump administration.
