= United States Department of the Interior =

Department of the US federal government

- Seal of the U.S. Department of the Interior

- Flag of the U.S. Department of the Interior

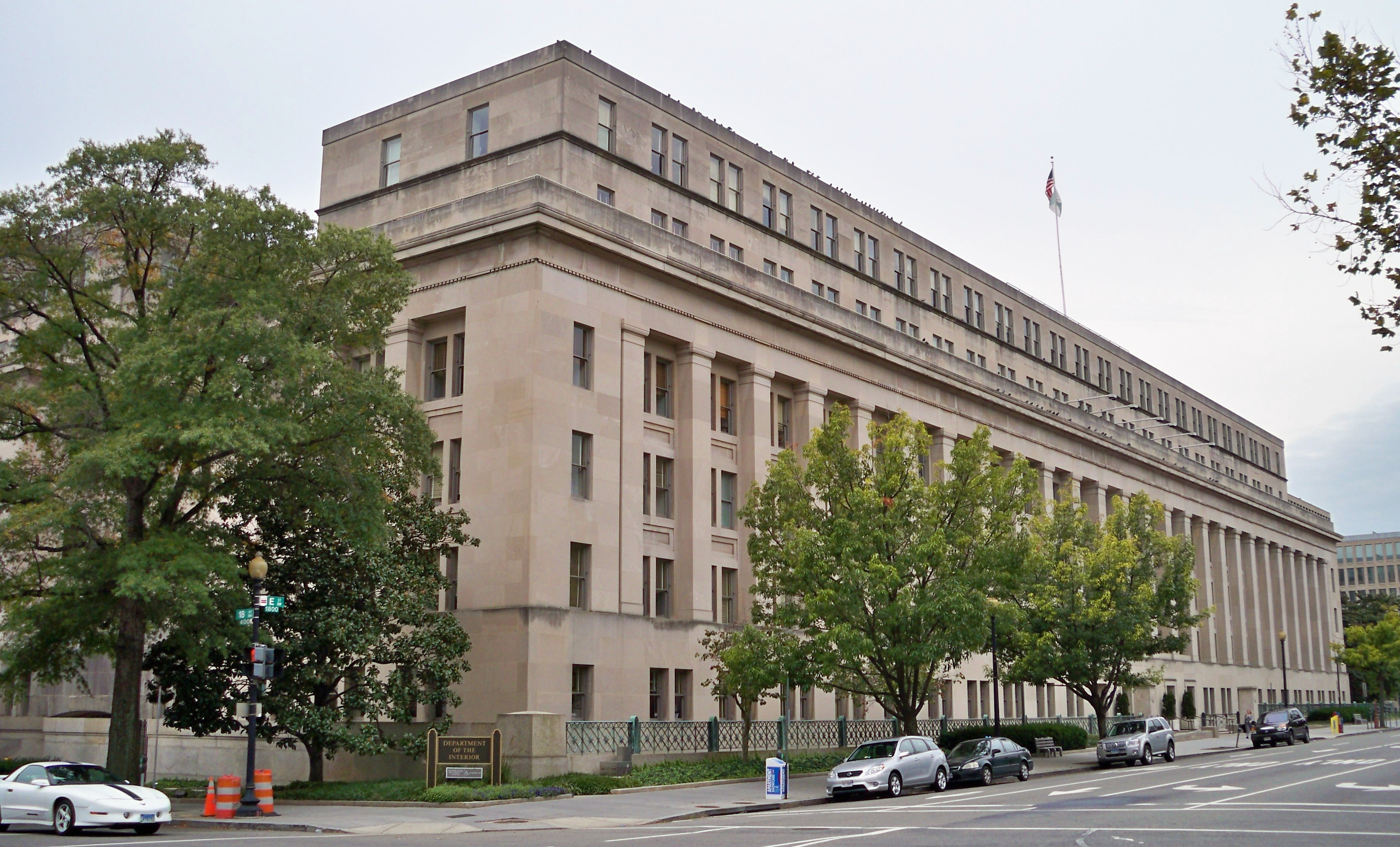
- Exterior of the main Interior Building

Agency overview
- Formed: March 3, 1849
- Type: Department
- Jurisdiction: Federal Government of the United States
- Headquarters: Main Interior Building; 1849 C Street NW; Washington, D.C., U.S.; 20240; 38°53′40″N 77°02′33″W
- Employees: 67,026
- Annual budget: $18.0 billion (2025)
- Secretary responsible: Doug Burgum
- Deputy Secretary responsible: Katharine MacGregor
- Website: doi.gov

The United States Department of the Interior (DOI) is an executive department of the U.S. federal government responsible for the management and conservation of most federal lands and natural resources. It also administers programs relating to Native Americans, Alaska Natives, Native Hawaiians, and four of the five inhabited insular areas of the United States, as well as programs related to historic preservation. About 75% of federal public land is managed by the department, with most of the remainder managed by the Department of Agriculture's Forest Service. The department was created on March 3, 1849. It is headquartered at the Main Interior Building, located at 1849 C Street NW in Washington, D.C.

The department is headed by the secretary of the interior, who reports directly to the president of the United States and is a member of the president's Cabinet. The current interior secretary is Doug Burgum, who was sworn in on February 1, 2025.

In January 2026, the department established the U.S. Wildland Fire Service within the Office of the Secretary to unify its wildland fire management programs.

As of mid-2004, the department managed 507 million acres (2,050,000 km^{2}) of surface land, or about one-fifth of the land in the United States. It manages 476 dams and 348 reservoirs through the Bureau of Reclamation, 434 national parks, monuments, historical sites, etc. through the National Park Service, and 544 national wildlife refuges through the Fish and Wildlife Service. The largest land management agency is the Bureau of Land Management, managing about one-eighth of the land in the United States.

Despite its name, the Department of the Interior has a different role from that of the interior ministries of other nations, which are usually responsible for police matters and internal security. In the United States, national security and immigration functions are performed by the Department of Homeland Security primarily and the Department of Justice secondarily. The Department of the Interior has often been humorously called "the Department of Everything Else" because of its broad range of responsibilities.

== History ==
=== Formation of the department ===
A department for domestic concern was first considered by the 1st United States Congress in 1789, but those duties were placed in the Department of State. The idea of a separate domestic department continued to percolate for a half-century and was supported by presidents from James Madison to James Polk. The 1846–48 Mexican–American War and the subsequent possession of vast amounts of land by the United States gave the proposal new steam as the responsibilities of the federal government grew. Polk's secretary of the treasury, Robert J. Walker, became a vocal champion of creating the new department.

In 1849, Walker stated in his annual report that several federal offices were placed in departments with which they had little to do. He noted that the United States General Land Office had little to do with the Treasury and also highlighted the Indian Affairs office, part of the Department of War, and the Patent Office, part of the Department of State. Walker argued that these and other bureaus should be brought together in a new Department of the Interior. A bill authorizing its creation of the department passed the House of Representatives on February 15, 1849, and spent just over two weeks in the Senate. The department was established on March 3, 1849 (9 Stat. 395), the eve of President Zachary Taylor's inauguration, when the Senate voted 31 to 25 to create the department. Its passage was delayed by Democrats in Congress who were reluctant to create more patronage posts for the incoming Whig administration to fill. The first secretary of the interior was Thomas Ewing.

Several of the domestic concerns the department originally dealt with were gradually transferred to other departments. For example, the Department of Interior was responsible for water pollution control prior to the creation of the Environmental Protection Agency. Other agencies became separate departments, such as the Bureau of Agriculture, which later became the Department of Agriculture. However, land and natural resource management, American Indian affairs, wildlife conservation, and territorial affairs remain the responsibilities of the Department of the Interior.

=== Controversies ===
Secretary of the Interior Albert B. Fall was implicated in the Teapot Dome scandal of 1921. He was convicted of bribery in 1929, and served one year in prison, for his part in the controversy. A major factor in the scandal was a transfer of certain oil leases from the jurisdiction of the Department of the Navy to that of the Department of the Interior, at Fall's behest.

Secretary of the Interior James G. Watt faced criticism for his alleged hostility to environmentalism, for his support of the development and use of federal lands by foresting, ranching, and other commercial interests, and for banning the Beach Boys from playing a 1983 Independence Day concert on the National Mall out of concerns of attracting "an undesirable element". His 1983 resignation was prompted by a speech in which he said about his staff: "I have a black, a woman, two Jews and a cripple. And we have talent."

Under the Administration of President George W. Bush, the Interior Department's maintenance backlog climbed from $5 billion to $8.7 billion, despite Bush's campaign pledges to eliminate it completely. Of the agency under Bush's leadership, Interior Department inspector general Earl Devaney has cited a "culture of fear" and of "ethical failure." Devaney has also said, "Simply stated, short of a crime, anything goes at the highest levels of the Department of Interior."

Launched in June 2021, the Federal Indian Boarding School Initiative intended to investigate federal Indian boarding school policies and multi-generational impacts of trauma on American Indian, Alaska Native, and Native Hawaiian children. Released in two volumes, the three year investigation produced the first report in May 2022 and the second and final volume in June 2024. The final report details the severe trauma and cultural disruption inflicted on Native American communities through these schools, which operated from the late 19th century to the mid-20th century. It highlights the systemic abuse and neglect endured by students, finding 973 children died at the schools and calls for accountability and measures to address the ongoing impact on Native American families and communities to include working closely with tribal nations on the identification and repatriation of the remains.

== Federal Consulting Group ==
Logo

The Federal Consulting Group was a part of the United States Department of the Interior until March 2025 when it was dissolved on the advice of Department of Government Efficiency (DOGE). The group was paid to broker contracts for other parts of the federal government as well as offering consulting, executive coaching, and performance and customer satisfaction measuring services to federal agencies.

In 2009 it described itself as part of the National Business Center of the DoI:

The Federal Consulting Group provided consultation services aimed at overcoming the organizational challenges of client offices. This was accomplished through assessment and construction of organizational logic models, amongst other methods. The Federal Consulting group consisted of three divisions: Consulting, Executive Coaching, and Performance Measurement & Customer Satisfaction. The Consulting and Coaching divisions provided the services indicated by their titles, while the Performance Measurement & Customer Satisfaction division provided clients with access to the American Customer Satisfaction Index (ACSI). The ACSI allows federal offices to demonstrate compliance with the President's Management Agenda and the Government Performance and Results Act to the Administration and Congress.

In April 2021, the National Science Foundation Office of Polar Programs entered into an agreement with Federal Consulting Group to oversee a needs assessment of the USAP as relates to allegations of sexual harassment and assault.

The group's last address was 1849 C St. NW Room 4342, Washington, DC 20240-0001.

== American Indians ==
Within the Interior Department, the Bureau of Indian Affairs handles some federal relations with American Indians, while others are handled by the Office of Special Trustee. The current assistant secretary for Indian affairs is William Kirkland, an enrolled member of the Navajo Nation.

The department has been the subject of disputes over proper accounting for American Indian Trusts set up to track the income and distribution of monies that are generated by the trust and specific American Indian lands, which the government leases for fees to companies that extract oil, timber, minerals, and other resources. Several cases have sought an accounting of such funds from departments within the Interior and Treasury (such as the Minerals Management Service), in what has been a 15-year-old lawsuit. Some American Indian nations have also sued the government over water-rights issues and their treaties with the US. In 2010 Congress passed the Claims Settlement Act of 2010 (Public Law 111-291), which provided $3.4 billion for the settlement of the Cobell v. Salazar class-action trust case and four American Indian water rights cases.

On March 16, 2021, Deb Haaland, serving at that time as a member of Congress for New Mexico, took the oath of office as secretary, becoming the first American Indian to lead an executive department, and the third woman to lead the department.

== Operating units ==
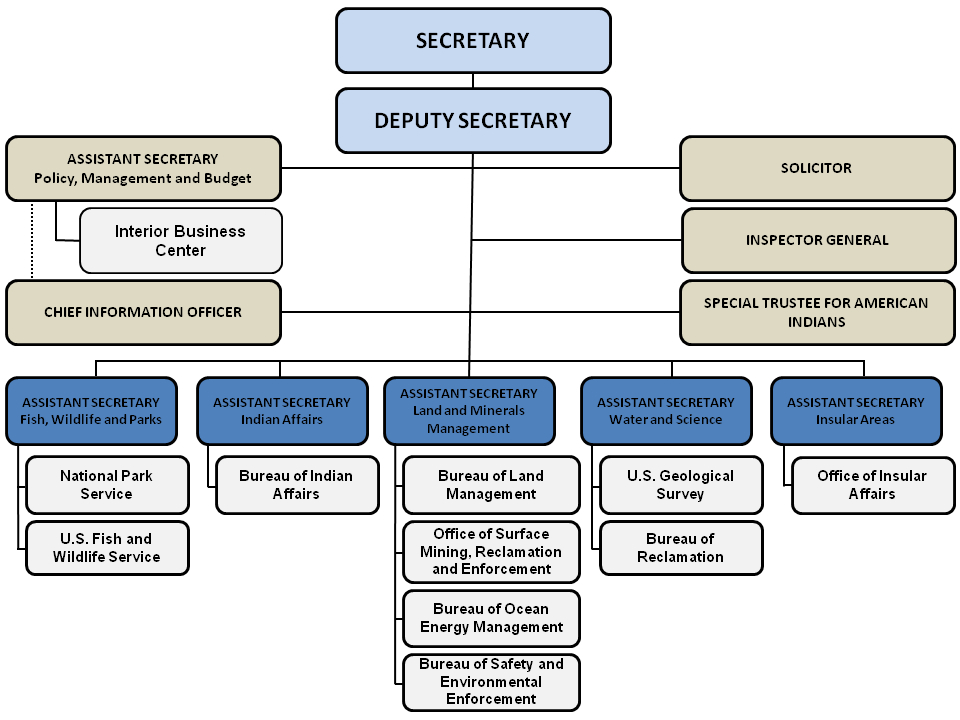
The hierarchy of the U.S. Department of the Interior

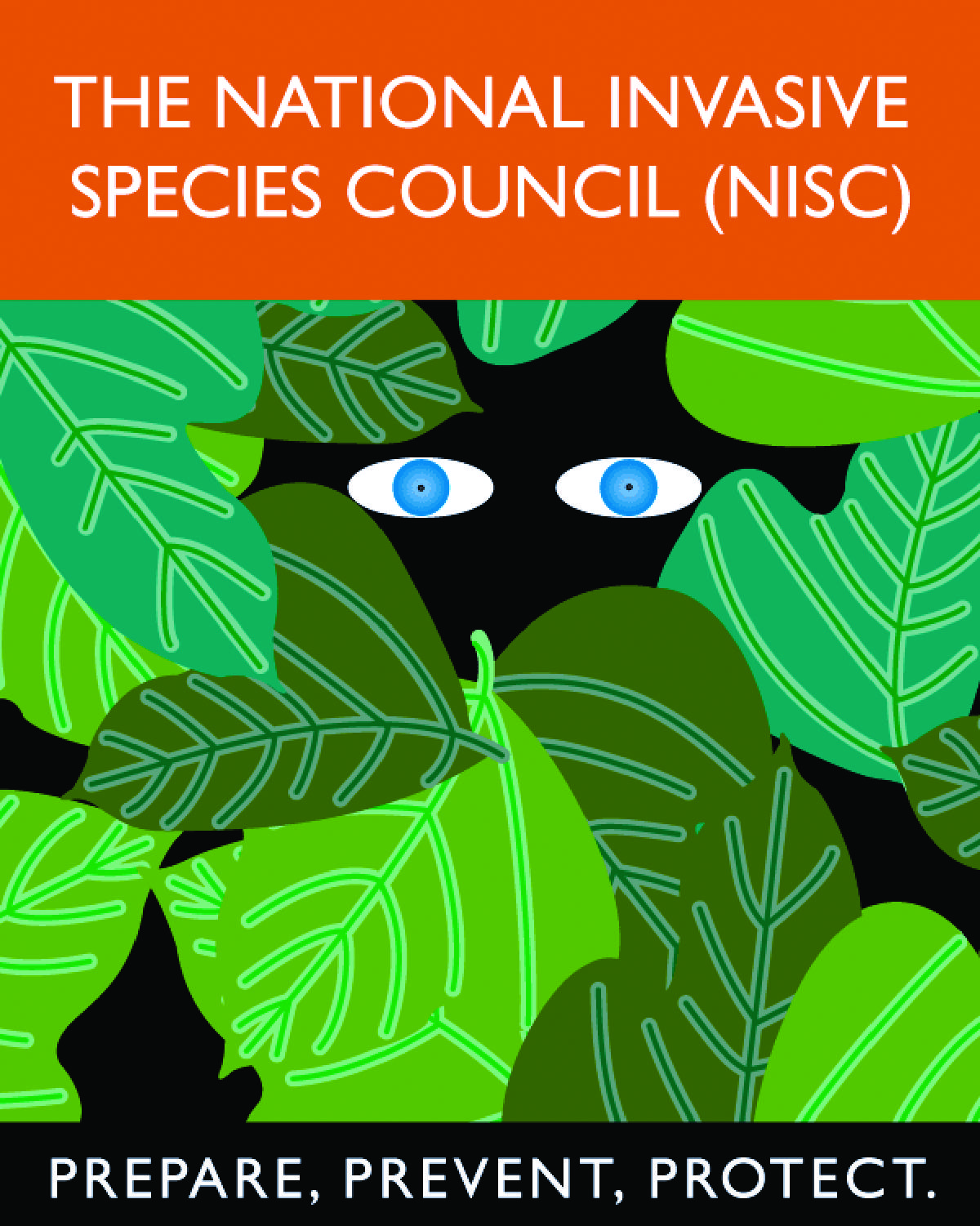
Logo of the National Invasive Species Council

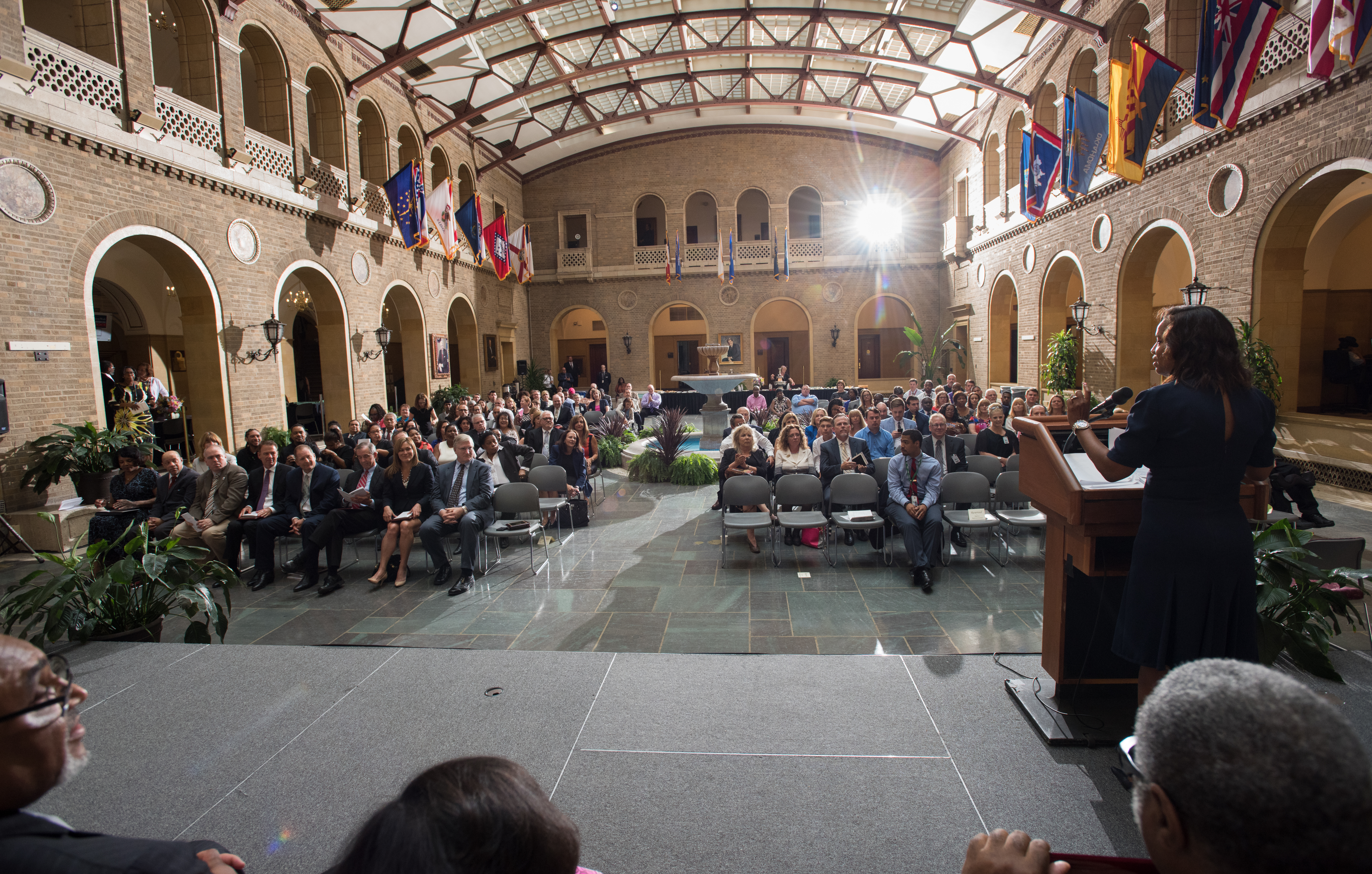
Office of Small and Disadvantaged Business Utilization Deputy Director, Michelle E. Warren, leading an awards ceremony in Washington, D.C.

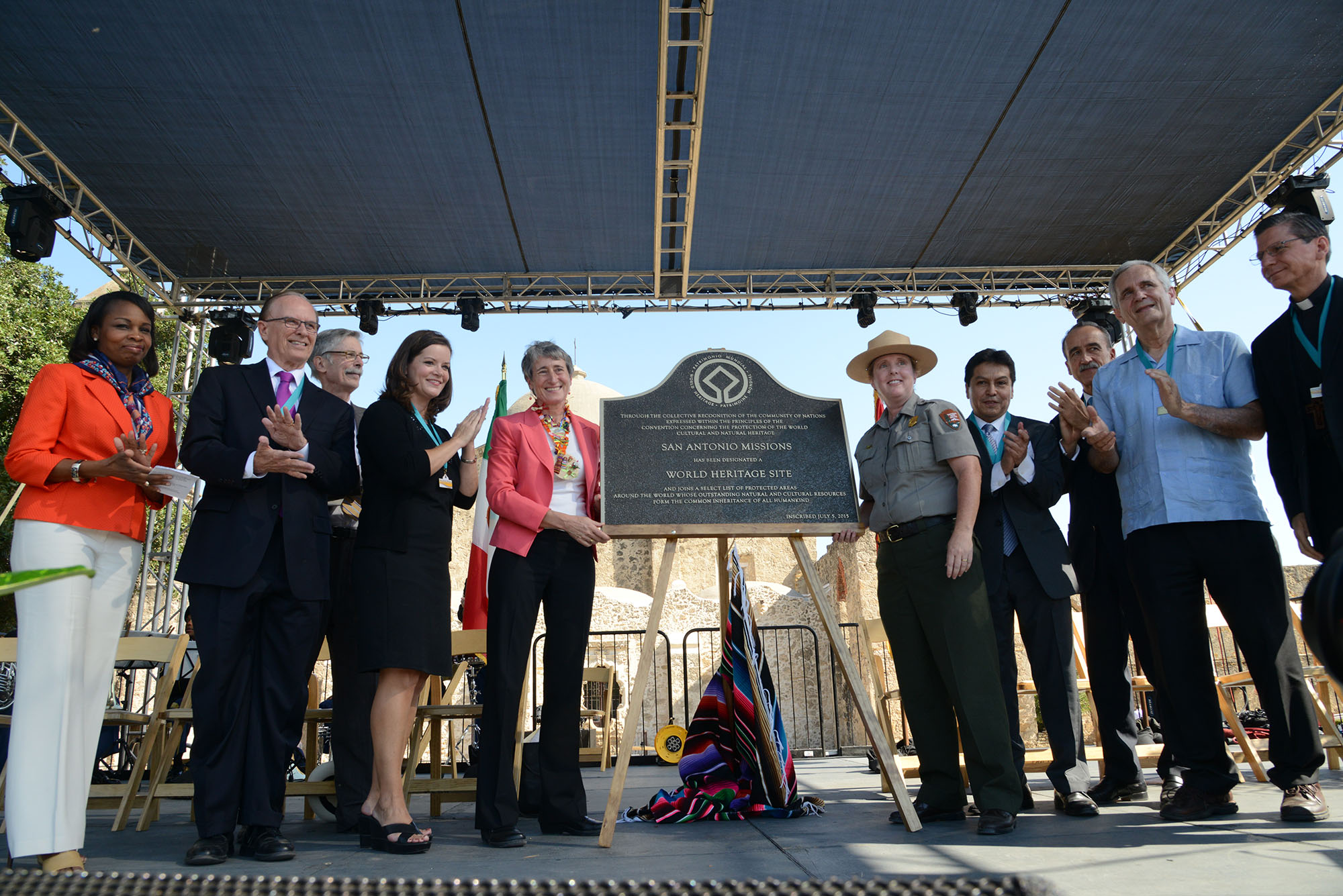
Deputy Assistant Secretary for Fish, Wildlife and Parks, Michael Bean (third from left), at the dedication of San Antonio Missions UNESCO World Heritage Site

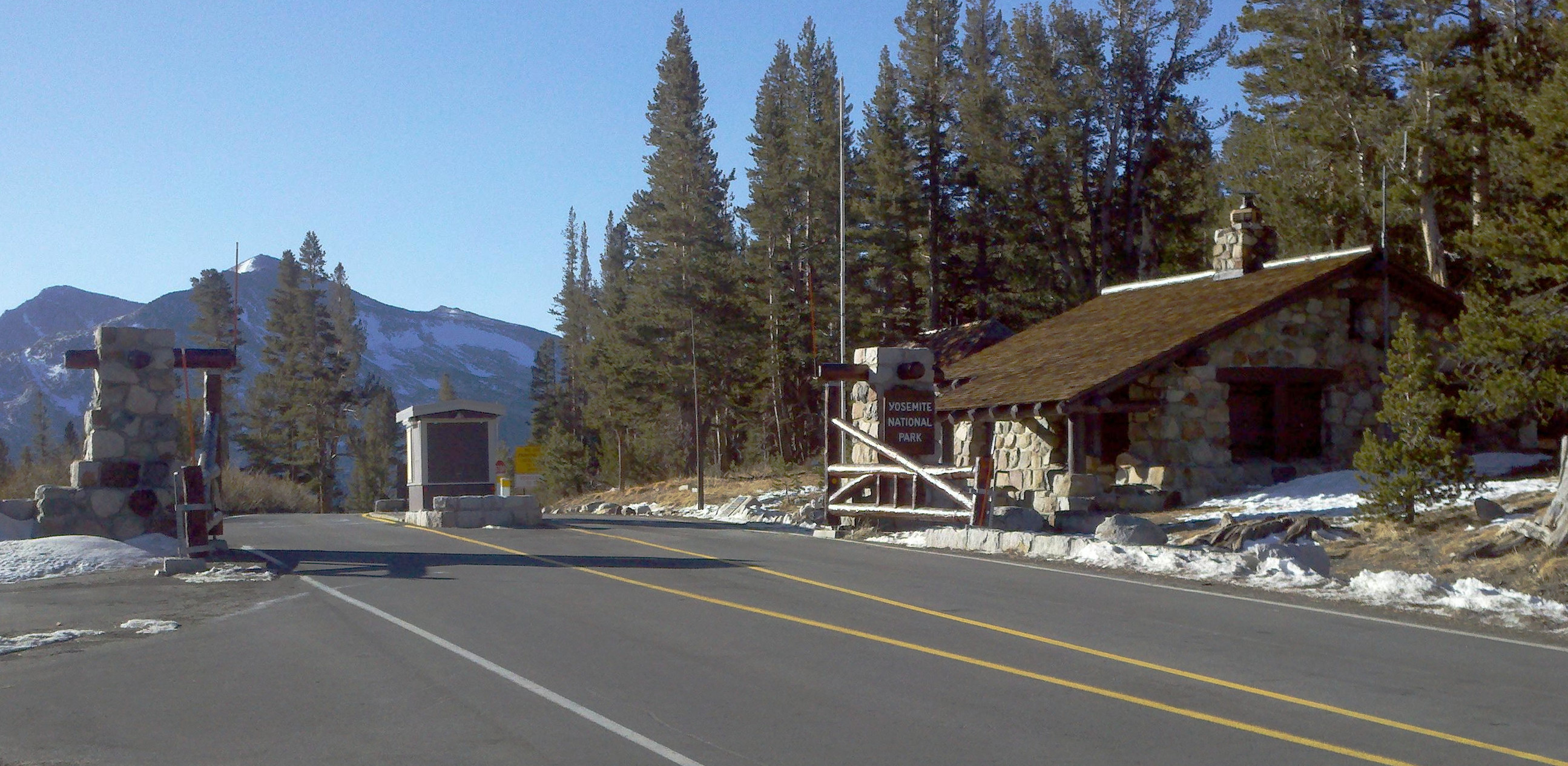
Eastern entry station to Yosemite National Park

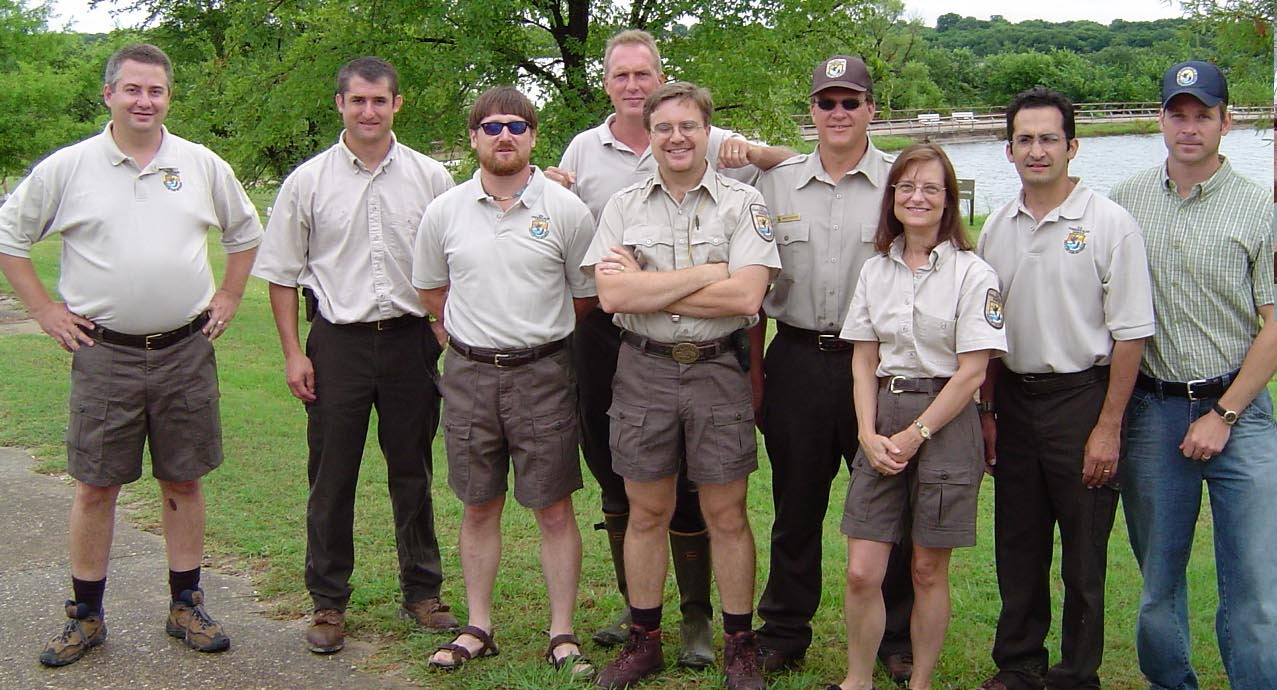
Fish and Wildlife Service personnel in Texas

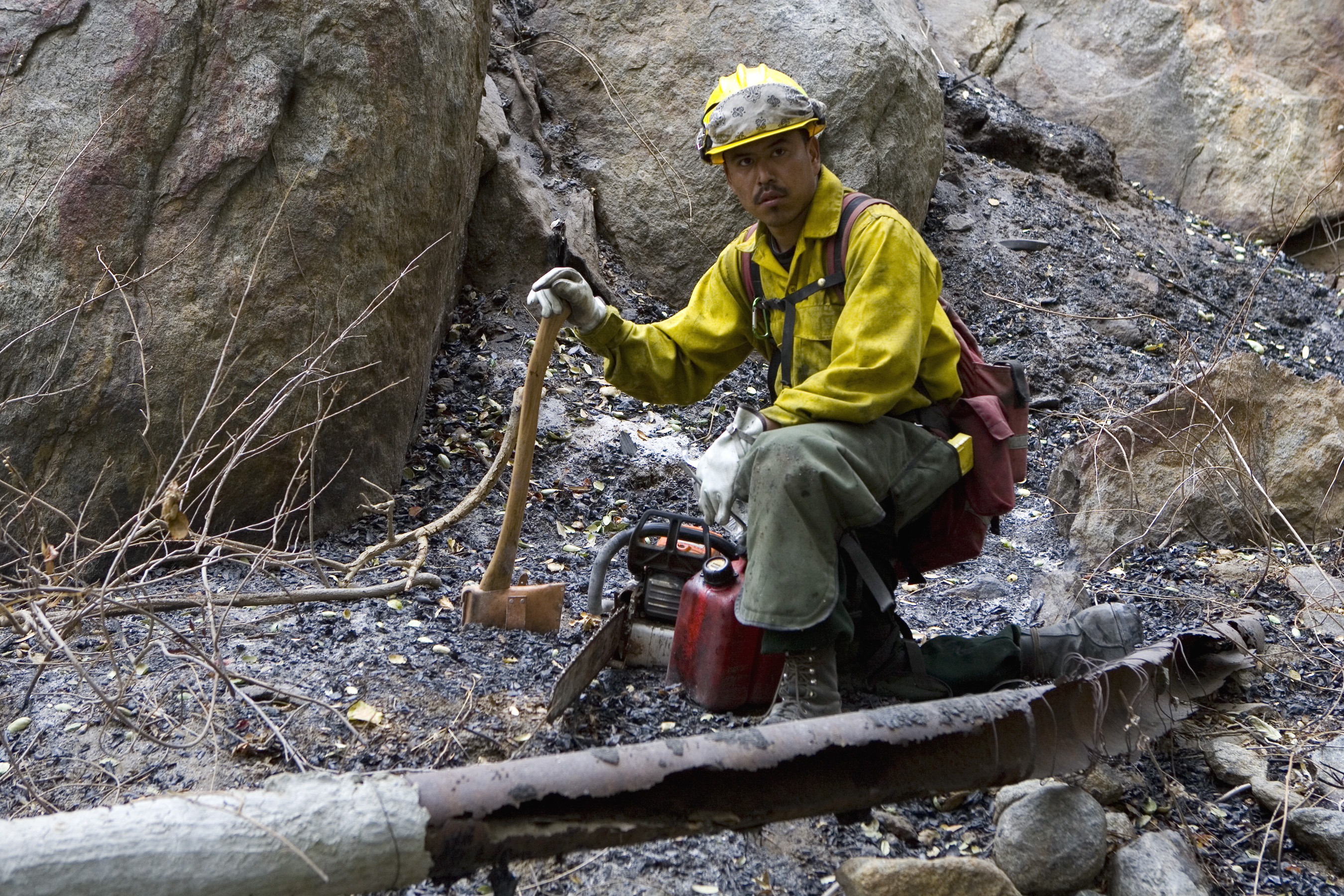
A Bureau of Indian Affairs firefighter at the La Jolla Indian Reservation

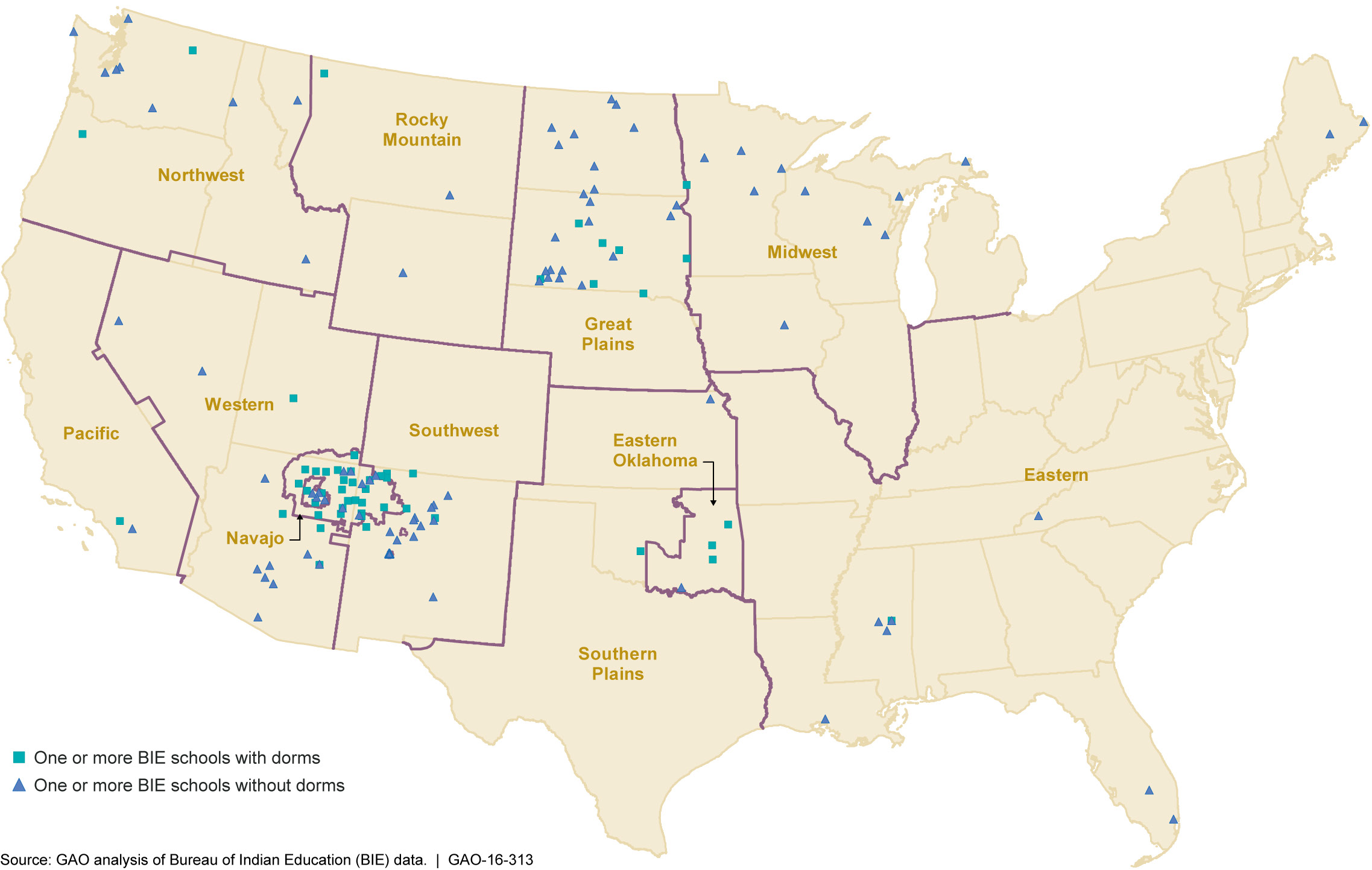
2016 map of Bureau of Indian Education schools

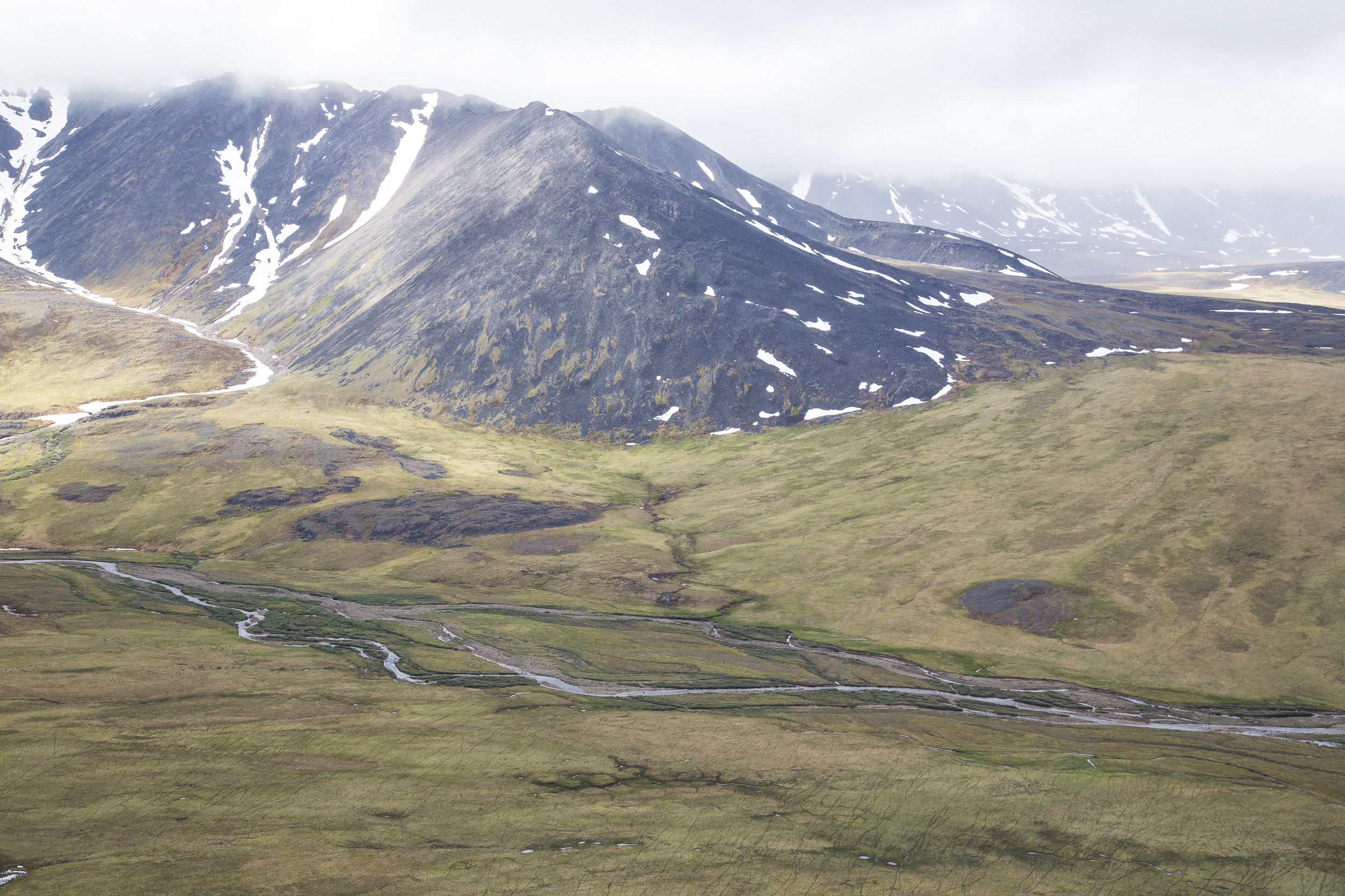
A Bureau of Land Management Wilderness Study Area in northern Alaska

- U.S. Wildland Fire Service (Office of the Secretary)
  - Office of Wildland Fire (OWF)
  - Office of Aviation Services (OAS)
- Assistant Secretary for Policy, Management, and Budget
  - Deputy Assistant Secretary for Policy and International Affairs
    - Office of Environmental Policy and Compliance
    - Office of International Affairs
    - Office of Native Hawaiian Relations
    - Office of Restoration and Damage Assessment
    - Office of Policy Analysis
    - National Invasive Species Council
  - Deputy Assistant Secretary for Budget, Finance, Performance and Acquisition
    - Office of Budget
    - Office of Financial Management
    - Office of Planning and Performance Management
    - Business Integration Office [administers the Financial and Business Management System (FBMS)]
    - Office of Acquisition and Property Management
    - Office of Small and Disadvantaged Business Utilization
  - Deputy Assistant Secretary for Human Capital and Diversity
    - Office of Human Resources
    - Office of Occupational Safety and Health
    - Office of Strategic Employee and Organizational Development
    - Office of Civil Rights
  - Deputy Assistant Secretary for Technology, Information and Business Services
    - Office of Collaborative Action and Dispute Resolution
    - Appraisal and Valuation Services Office
    - Interior Business Center
    - Office of Hearings and Appeals
    - Office of Facilities and Administrative Services
    - Office of the Chief Information Officer
  - Deputy Assistant Secretary for Public Safety, Resources Protection and Emergency Services (DAS-PRE)
    - Office of Emergency Management (OEM)
    - Office of Law Enforcement and Security (OLES)
    - Interagency Borderlands Coordinator
  - Deputy Assistant Secretary for Natural Resources Revenue Management
    - Office of Natural Resources Revenue
- Assistant Secretary for Fish and Wildlife and Parks
  - National Park Service
  - United States Fish and Wildlife Service
- Assistant Secretary for Indian Affairs
  - Deputy Assistant Secretary for Management
    - Office of the Chief Financial Officer (OCFO)
    - Office of the Chief Information Officer (OCIO)
    - Office of Human Capital Management (OHCM)
    - Office of Planning and Policy Analysis (OPPA)
    - Office of Facilities, Environmental and Cultural Resources (OFECR)
  - Deputy Assistant Secretary for Policy and Economic Development
    - Office of Indian Energy and Economic Development (IEED)
    - Office of Indian Gaming (OIG)
    - Office of Self-Governance (OSG)
  - Bureau of Indian Affairs (BIA)
    - Office of Indian Services (OIS)
    - Office of Field Operations (OFO)
    - Office of Justice Services (OJS)
    - Office of Trust Services (OTS)
  - Bureau of Indian Education (BIE)
  - Office of External Affairs
    - Office of Congressional and Legislative Affairs (OCLA)
    - Office of Public Affairs (OPA)
  - Office of Federal Acknowledgment (OFA)
  - Office of Regulatory Management (ORM)
- Assistant Secretary for Land and Minerals Management
  - Bureau of Land Management
  - Office of Surface Mining Reclamation and Enforcement
  - Bureau of Ocean Energy Management
  - Bureau of Safety and Environmental Enforcement
- Assistant Secretary for Water and Science
  - United States Geological Survey
  - Bureau of Reclamation
  - Central Utah Project Completion Act Office
- Assistant Secretary for Insular and International Affairs
  - Office of Insular Affairs
  - Office of International Affairs
  - Ocean, Great Lakes and Coastal Activities Program Office
- Solicitor
  - Office of the Solicitor (SOL)
- Office of the Inspector General (OIG)
  - Office of General Counsel
  - Assistant Inspector General for Investigations
    - Office of Investigations
  - Assistant Inspector General for Audits, Inspections, and Evaluations
    - Office of Audits, Inspections, and Evaluations
  - Assistant Inspector General for Management
    - Office of Management
  - Associate Inspector General for External Affairs
  - Associate Inspector General for Whistleblower Protection
  - Strategy Management Office
  - Associate Inspector General for Communications
- Chief Information Officer
- Special Trustee for American Indians
- Federal Executive Boards
- Interior Museum
- National Indian Gaming Commission (NIGC)

== Awards ==
DOI Convocation Honor Award is the most prestigious recognition that can be granted by the department.

The following awards are presented at the Honor Awards Convocation:

- Safety and Health Award of Excellence & Aviation Safety Award
- Distinguished Service Award
- Citizen's Award for Bravery
- Valor Award

== Regions ==
In 2018, DOI established 12 organizational regions to be used across the department. These superseded the previous 49 regions used across 8 agencies.

== See also ==
- America's Great Outdoors Initiative
- Environmental policy of the United States
- USA.gov
