= Curt Berklund =

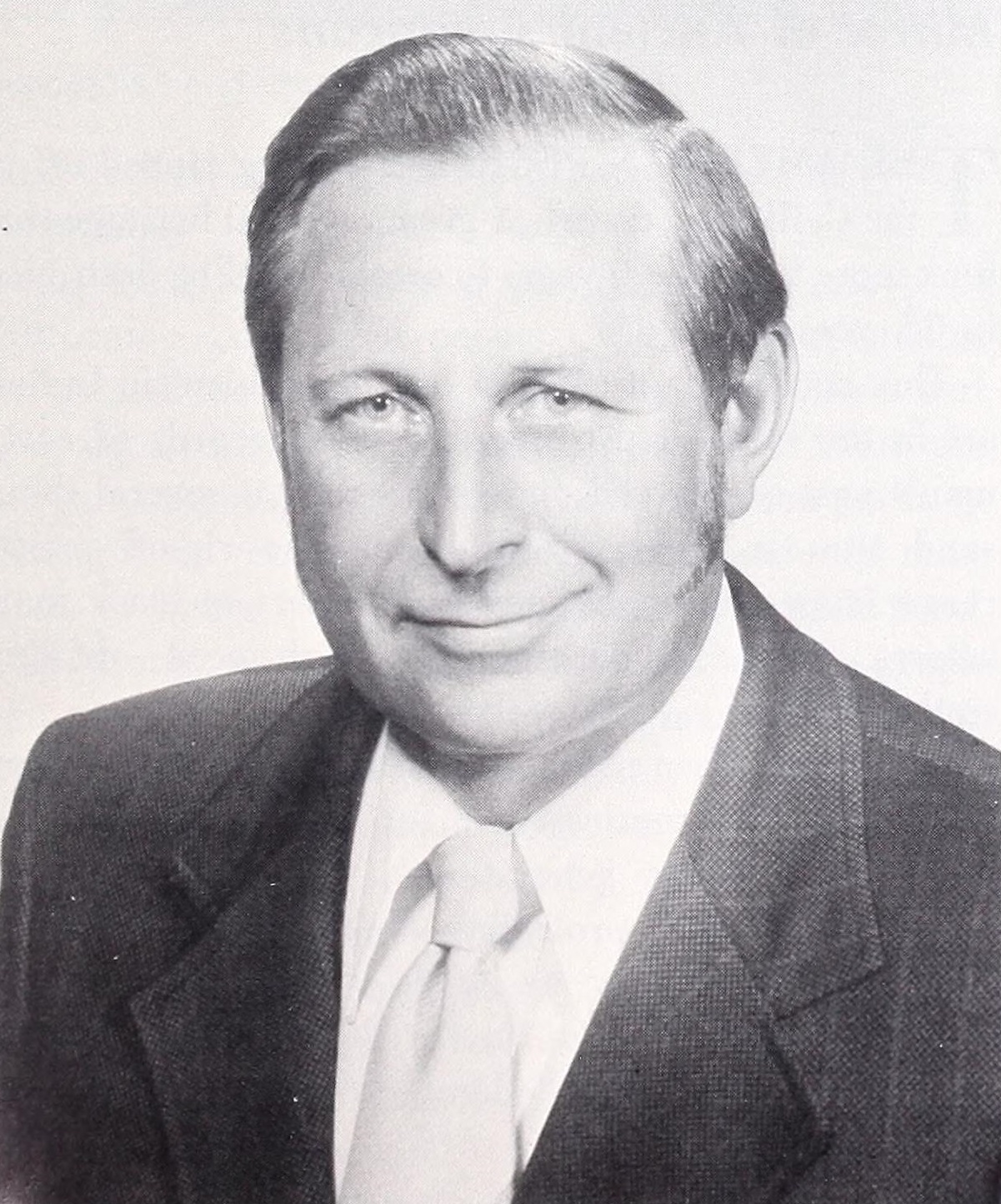

8th Director of the Bureau of Land Management
- In office 1973–1977
- President: Richard Nixon; Gerald Ford
- Preceded by: Burton W. Silcock
- Succeeded by: Frank Gregg

Personal details
- Born: June 22, 1929 Fence, Wisconsin
- Died: April 5, 2013 (aged 83) Greenacres, Washington
- Party: Republican

Curt Berklund (June 22, 1929 – April 5, 2013) was an American administrator who served as the Director of the Bureau of Land Management from 1973 to 1977.

He died on April 5, 2013, in Greenacres, Washington at age 83.
