= Allocation (oil and gas) =

In the petroleum industry, Allocation is typically referred to as Production Allocation, which consists of two key components: commercial allocation and technical allocation. Commercial allocation ensures the accurate distribution of revenue and costs, while technical allocation refers to practices of breaking down measures of quantities of extracted hydrocarbons across various contributing sources. Allocation aids the attribution of ownerships of hydrocarbons as each contributing element to a commingled flow or to a storage of petroleum may have a unique ownership. Contributing sources in this context are typically producing petroleum wells delivering flows of petroleum or flows of natural gas to a commingled flow or storage.

The terms hydrocarbon accounting and allocation are sometimes used interchangeably. Hydrocarbon accounting has a wider scope, taking advantages of allocation results, it is the petroleum management process by which ownership of extracted hydrocarbons is determined and tracked from a point of sale or discharge back to the point of extraction. In this way, hydrocarbon accounting also covers inventory control, material balance, and practices to trace ownership of hydrocarbons being transported in a transportation system, e.g. through pipelines to customers distant from the production plant.

In an allocation problem, contributing sources are more widely natural gas streams, fluid flows or multiphase flows derived from formations or zones in a well, from wells, and from fields, unitised production entities or production facilities. In hydrocarbon accounting, quantities of extracted hydrocarbon can be further split by ownership, by "cost oil" or "profit oil" categories, and broken down to individual composition fraction types. Such components may be alkane hydrocarbons, boiling point fractions, and mole weight fractions.

== Scope and terminology ==
The term allocate is being used in the sense to denote distributing according to a plan, but the etymology may also be linked to 'earmark'. The term accounting is being used in the sense to denote justification of actions.

In the context of hydrocarbon accounting, an oil field is an area developed for exploration of hydrocarbons from one or more reservoirs in the underground. Sometimes one well extracts hydrocarbons from more than one geologic formation or reservoir, hence it may be useful to divide the oil field and its well streams by formations or layers. More than one oil field may share infrastructure like oil processing units and pipelines. The field activities are regulated by a jurisdiction of a state and a contract of the licence. The contract is a business arrangement for exploration of the oil field between the licensor, (the mineral rights owner, onshore in United States often the land owner, elsewhere often the state possesses the ownership of mineral rights including petroleum reservoirs) and a licensee to share investment costs, operational costs, and income from the oil field. In case of a production sharing agreement, PSA, the licensee will take all development costs and have this capital recovered by "cost oil". "Profit oil" will be shared by licensee and the state. The licensee may be one oil company, or often a group of companies sharing the risks, costs and profit in a partnership, consortium or joint venture. When more than one company is involved, the term "group ownership members" is used, and the business arrangement for petroleum extraction specifies the equity of cost and income for each member company. Where a petroleum concessionary licence system is in use rather than contractual type of petroleum fiscal regime, ownership of extracted hydrocarbons are shared according to fixed equities of each member company.

=== More specific definitions ===
Field allocation or platform allocation denotes allocation cases where contribution sources are more than one production field or more than one offshore platform, making a commingled flow into a pipeline.

Well allocation is a term used in the case where the contribution sources are production petroleum wells, or any type of injection well.

Component allocation: while the term product allocation is used to allocate the primary product groups like oil, gas or condensate ingredients (phase fractions) to a contributing well for instance, component allocation breaks down and allocate individual alkane hydrocarbons like methane and ethane, to 3 isomers pentanes in a natural gas stream. Components of crude oil streams to be allocated may be split up by boiling point fractions.

Other combinatorics on the allocation term include production allocation, hydrocarbon allocation, pipeline allocation and back allocation. Export allocation denotes the allocation at a custody transfer where production quantities are transferred from an oil field. Allocation at exports decide exactly what quantities each partner of the contract is paid for. Ownership allocation is also used to denote the income distribution from extracted hydrocarbons on each partner of a licence or joint business arrangement area.

=== Scope ===
Allocation is an ongoing process based on flow or volume measurements, and gives the distribution of contributing sources, often with a final calculation per day, which in turn provides the basis for a daily production report in the case of a field that produces hydrocarbons. Moreover, the allocation process may be designed to split up a flow of multiple products of the individual ingredients or phase fractions, for example when associated gas and water are supplied with a crude oil flow, and each fraction within the commingled flow or storage is allocated between the contributors and its ownership. A traditional allocation practice will execute quantity calculations for crude oil, natural-gas condensate and produced water based on measured results from periodic, time-limited well tests. Natural gas flows from pure gas wells are usually measured continuously at or near the individual wellheads.

Within the wider scope of hydrocarbon accounting; all measurements and parameters used for calculations are being deposited in a data storage, results of calculations along with methods used in calculations, are stored in a manner that is accepted by the internal and external audit. Stored results can be further utilised to optimise the reservoir performance of a producing field, possibly optimising the utilisation in case of a transportation system.

The hydrocarbon accounting process is emphasizing the tracking of all hydrocarbons through flows until a sale to a customer has occurred or hydrocarbons are disposed for including all fluid discharges, vents and flaring of gas, consumption of gas for power production at the facility, and quantities of evaporation from oil storages. Similarly, measurements of injected flow of water and gas into the reservoir through injection wells are being part of hydrocarbon accounting.

== Demand for allocation ==
Allocation is commercial rooted in the need to distribute the costs, revenues and taxes among multiple players collaborating on field development and production of oil and gas. There are various incentives for collaboration, one is risk and cost sharing, the practice by issuing licenses for exploration and production to a partnership of oil companies. Another is the aim of improving production efficiency, by extracting from multiple land properties or multiple oil fields by shared arrangement for production, also called unitisation.

Production allocation to wellbore or completion is required for Reservoir Simulation where the dynamic geological model is history matched and used for production forecasting.

=== History ===
The principle of unitised production, to allow for more efficient development of new exploration areas, was established for the Van field in the State of Texas, US, since 1929, and this practice has been developed to a widespread "hidden law of unitisation" in Texas. Even before 1929, it was early established a practice of sharing equipment to extract from several wells. Today, most US states except Texas, have compulsory unitization statutes. Ownership and extraction of oil and gas in the ground of USA is regulated by the present oil and gas law in the United States.

Sharing risks by a joint venture of several companies to field development, production and transportation, and downstream activities has also been going on for long time, specifically for cross border arrangements. In the North Sea, oil companies shared risk in consortia, and in the initial licence round regulated by Norwegian government, more than half of the licences were awarded partnerships of several licensees. It has also been a clear tendency towards transition to awarding licences to partnerships.

In recent times, cost savings have become an impetus for shared utilisation of infrastructures for processing and transport of oil and gas in areas of extraction from the ground. Methods are being developed to allocate back contributions into commingled streams in pipeline, when oil is being transported from a collection of offshore oil fields to facilities terminals onshore in Asia.

Recent restructuring in this industry for enhanced oil recovery, deepwater field development, and use of subsea production systems that commingled production flows from multiple oil fields, strengthen the requirements for flexible and accurate allocation systems, to keep up with the transition from conventional well flow testing to prevalence of model simulations, virtual flow meters and multiphase flow meters.

=== Benefits ===
There are multiple operational benefits from allocation. Detailed results from allocation to wells, or even to oil or gas layers per well, are used to manage the production process.

Results from the allocation process are important feed into production reporting to governments and partners, and allocation results may also feed operator's internal systems for product sales, accounting, enterprise resource planning, data warehouse, and management information. Allocation and hydrocarbon accounting are supporting information to the wider business area petroleum accounting, the latter considering life cycle business and financial aspects of oil field operations.

== Allocation practices and methods ==
Transparency, fairness and compliance with audit requirements are fundamental criteria for the design of allocation practices and methods. Furthermore, the implemented processes should be cost efficient as well as practical to operate. Requirements for the measurement processes and the associated allocation process are set by legislation and the relevant government authority, contract documents governing the relationship between the operator, partners, licensor, and government may also provide guidelines for allocation. Details of design configuration and setup can be read out of available piping and instrumentation diagrams, process flow diagrams and other documentation showing flow measurement and connections between measuring points via flow from wells to sale points. P&ID showing downhole sensors may also contribute to the design of an allocation process.

Partners involved in any allocation system, agree upon and establish a set of principles to follow. The principles states the units and measurement types used in allocations, i.e. where to account mass, volume, molar or energy balance. Since physical properties of hydrocarbons are constantly changing when hydrocarbons from various contributing sources are mixed, affected by heat transfer and transitions in pressure and temperature, owners of hydrocarbon in a commingled material cannot be allocated materials equal to what physically delivered from their well. For instance, two multiphase streams are commingled, one with oil of mole weight 107 and gas of 20 kg/kgmol, the other of 116 and 21 respectively, may result in a commingled stream of 115 kg/kgmol for the oil and mole weight of 20.3 kg/kgmol for the gas. The allocation principles account for this effect.

=== Sample configurations ===
Figure 1: Illustration of meter setup in allocation problems, simplified for clarity. A host field "A" processing plant separates, processes and exports hydrocarbon flows from field "A", and two satellite fields "B" and "C". Legend: Red M is custody transfer meter, black M fiscal meter, gray M indicate optional allocation meter.

Allocation systems seen in the figure to the right:

- Fields "B" and "C" are each a basic allocation system where all the measured out-flow quantities from the field are allocated to the respective wells, and allocation can be conducted on all phases, oil, gas, water. ("B" and "C" have possible subsea plants only.)
- Field "A", an oil field where fluid of oil, produced water and associated gas is extracted. If free of pipeline connection, field "A" illustrates the typical allocation case. A processing plant splits crude oil into three fractions. Metering stations on the export point satisfy requirements for custody transfer, measuring instrument for flare gas is a fiscal measurement if subject to taxation, it depends on regulatory requirements. Measurement of well streams will typically have lower accuracy, or no meters are installed, when estimation processes are in use.
- All together, the collection of fields is a field allocation system in which contributions in sales products are allocated to each of the three fields.

=== Measurements ===
Not all streams and measurements at a production plant will feed an allocation process, but all allocations need at least measurement of the total out-flow or total volume, along with measurements, or estimates for, or some physical properties of the contributing flows included in the total.

Fiscal measurements meet the statutory requirements for accuracy in the jurisdiction for tax payments to the government; custody transfer measurements meet the requirements for financial transactions between buyers and sellers of hydrocarbons; allocation measurements helps support the allocation of all contributors to a commingled flow, whereby it also supports ownership allocation. Allocation measurements may not meet custody transfer standards.

Flow measurement and allocation
| Flow location | Measurement type | Allocation |
|---|---|---|
| Flow to an export transportation system, (pipeline, tanker, truck) | Fiscal measurement and Custody transfer measurement | Back allocation to field or well, ownership allocation |
| Flow into and out of an intermediate fluid storage | Custody transfer measurement | Back allocation to field or well |
| Flow to consumption, power, flare | Fiscal measurement | N/A |
| Flow to shared facility, from a satellite field | Custody transfer measurement (when ownership changes) | Field allocation |
| Flow from the reservoir | Allocation measurement | Back allocation to well or formation |
| Flow from a gas well | E.g. with ultrasonic flow meter | |
| Flow from an oil well | Well test or with multiphase meter for instance | |
| Various flows within the processing facility | Meters with sufficient accuracies | |
Table 1: A selection of places where flows are measured. The list not intended to be fully comprehensive.

Corrected, measured liquid total (Net quantity)

When a quantity of ready processed liquid, e.g. oil, has been measured, there is still transformation to take place from indicated to the net quantity to be accounted:

$$Q_n = Q_i * MF * CTL * SF * SW$$

where

$Q_i$ indicated quantity is the gross measured volume
MF, Meter Factor, adjust to actual volume, this factor is determined by probing
CTL is a volume correction factor for the effects of temperature on liquid
SF, Shrinkage Factor, adjusts for changes in pressure temperature and composition, for instance shrinkage of fluid occurs when pressure drops and constituents change to gas phase
SW (S&W), Sediment and Water factor, adjusts for remaining water and contaminants, determined by sample analysis

==== Flow meters ====
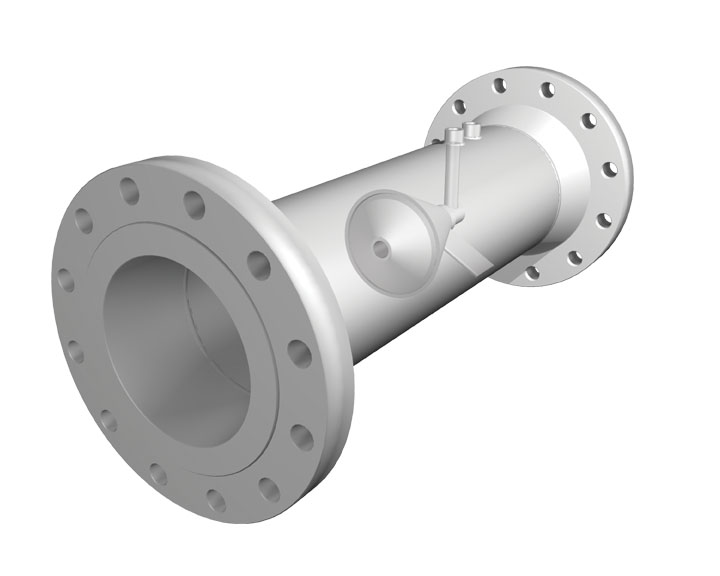
V-Cone Flow meter with raised face weld neck flanges

Flow meters for the measurements in the oil and gas upstream industry are chosen based on type of measurement, performance and accuracy requirements, and the type of medium to be measured. Available meters in the market are characterized by properties such as accuracy, operational rangeability: flowrate, viscosity, velocity, pressure and temperature conditions, durability and demand with respect to calibration and monitoring, the ability to withstand contaminants, injected chemicals, salty and acidic environment. For the application of custody transfer measurements of fluid hydrocarbons, positive displacement meters and turbine meters have been preferred. For gas metering, gas orifice meters and ultrasonic flow meters are most common. Coriolis meters are in use for liquid measurements, but can also take gas measurement applications.

For the application of allocation measurements, multiphase flow meters have been adopted, especially for subsea production systems. These equipments are able to deduce the proportion and flow rate of each fluid phase.

=== Estimates, alternatives for measures ===
In some locations it is too costly or not practical to implement metering of flow rates, e.g. down in the wells and in many places at process plants, especially on subsea plants. However, a set of methods and techniques that aim to provide estimates for flows, are adopted by the industry to solve allocation problems.

Geochemical allocation

Gas chromatography and isotope analysis are the known methods that are used for determining the characteristics of hydrocarbon material samples. The method is also named oil fingerprinting, and uses data about the chemical and isotope composition of liquid and gas flow for each contribution that is collected. Samples from each contributing stream is parsed, and fingerprints established, for example by using whole-oil gas chromatography methods. These fingerprints are then recognized in aggregate flows, which in turn can help to allocate back to the sources.

Applications of this method comprise allocation of single formation or layer in a commingled well, and allocation of commingled pipeline oil to contributing oil fields. Moreover, the adoption of fingerprinting is widely spread geographically, it includes North America and the Middle East.

Flow rate estimation

There are varieties of methods for estimating the flow rate of the wells when flow measurements are unavailable. Models describe multiphase flows behaviour under different conditions, and they are continuously being supplied with readings from pressure, temperature, and pressure drop across the venturi and density, and other properties. Ensemble based data assimilation methods are among available techniques for back allocation to reservoir formations.

A virtual flow meter is a type of an implementation using such methods. Some gas and condensate fields in the North Sea are developed with subsea templates where multiphase flow meters are installed for each well and virtual flow meters for each well are taken in use as a backup for and redundancy to the flow meters.

Process models and phase behaviour models are other implementations of rate estimation. With the aid of commercially available software, process models simulate the behaviour of hydrocarbons in the processing plant. Among other purposes it is used for calculation of shrinkage factors or expansion factors and estimation of flow inside the plant that does not have meters. The models build on the theory of thermodynamics to predict the behaviour of components in the streams. Examples of equations of state that contribute to the calculations in such models are Peng–Robinson equation of state and/or Soave modification of Redlich-Kwong. Process models with simulations are in use in allocation systems at North Sea plants.

=== Uncertainty in measures and allocation ===
In the oil and gas industry, it is common that the regulatory authorities in the country set requirements for all measurements of produced hydrocarbons, where such measurements affect taxes or royalties to the government, the fiscal measurements. Requirements can be found in a guideline and be specific in the way uncertainties are targeted. Examples of targets in publicly available standards and guidelines are:

Flow measurement and target uncertainties
| | Newfoundland, Labrador, Nova Scotia | United Kingdom | Norway |
|---|---|---|---|
| Liquid volume | ±0.25% | ±0.25% | ±0.3% |
| Gas mass | ±1% | ±1% | ±1% |

For oil and gas well allocation, Newfoundland and Labrador and Nova Scotia Offshore Areas, Drilling and Production Regulations, for example, requires accuracy within ±5%.

In general, the total uncertainty of the allocation system is related to measurement uncertainty of each measured input. Investments in improved metering systems and operations to reduce the uncertainty may be subject to cost benefit analysis that points to an optimum, overall uncertainty in the allocated products.

=== Proportional allocation ===
Figure 2: Periodic well tests on the production plant is the conventional way to get an estimated or theoretical production contribution per phase fraction per well per month. This plant is receiving a multi phased flow of oil and gas from many wells via a manifold. Flow from one well at a time is taken to the test separator (shaded). The output flow rates are measured for each phase fraction.

It is easy to implement measures of flow rates of commingled, single phase hydrocarbon flows under normal pressure and temperature, but often not feasible to measure the individual well flow rate of multiphase streams from oil wells, under high temperature and pressure, while achieving known and acceptable uncertainty in the measurements. A practical adaptation to this problem is to estimate or otherwise prepare theoretical estimates of the flow rate from the individual wells, and somehow normalise the estimates to even out discrepancies with the measured overall product stream from a production facility.

The conventional approach of estimating individual flow performance from contributing oil wells in the allocation problem is the well test practice using test separator.

Proportional allocation calculation

This is generally the most intuitive procedure, allocating a stream to the contributing stream sources in proportions according to a known quantity.

$$Q_k = C_k{Q_T\over\sum_{k=1}^N C_k}$$

where

N is the number of contributing sources, for example number of wells
$Q_T$ is the total quantity in stream to be allocated
$C_k$ is a measured or estimated quantity portion of contributor k, for example from a flow test
$Q_k$ is the portion of the total allocated to contributor k

The quantity Q could be mass or energy as well as volume. The allocation calculations are carried out per phase, for example oil, gas and water respectively.

Example with calculations to illustrate the principle of proportional allocation

Assume that the flows of separated oil from two production units go to a common storage tank. The tank is used as a cache so that the owners of the oil can get their load according to an entitlement plan. Allocation is first calculated using estimated production from each well, based on well testing.

The results of a well test in May are shown in the column "Theoretical production" below. Suppose it was measured in 610,000 barrels (corrected, measured total) of oil produced by end of May 2013.

An example of monthly production allocation via theoretical oil production from well test
| Plant / platform | Well | Hours contributing | Hours on test | Test results | Calculation | Theoretical production | Calculation | Well allocation |
|---|---|---|---|---|---|---|---|---|
| "Skink" | S-1 | 672 | 24 | 5000 | 5000*672/24 | 140,000 | 140000*610000/615800 | 138,681 |
| | S-2 | 672 | 24 | 4000 | 4000*672/24 | 112,000 | 112000*610000/615800 | 110,945 |
| | S-5 | 672 | 24 | 4500 | 4500*672/24 | 126,000 | 126000*610000/615800 | 124,813 |
| | | | | | | | Plant total | 374,440 |
| "Gecko" | G-2 | 696 | 12 | 2500 | 2500*696/12 | 145,000 | 145000*610000/615800 | 143,634 |
| | G-3 | 696 | 12 | 1000 | 1000*696/12 | 58,000 | 58000*610000/615800 | 57,454 |
| | G-5 | 696 | 24 | 1200 | 1200*696/24 | 34,800 | 34800*610000/615800 | 34,472 |
| | | | | | | | Plant total | 235,560 |
| Theoretical tank total | | | | | | 615,800 | | |
| Corrected, measured total (Net quantity) | | | | | | | | 610,000 |
Table 2: The example shows the final allocation by month end. It distributes the total measured oil, 610,000 bbl to each well, at the proportion of estimates given by the well test results. The case is simplified for illustration purposes.

Field factor
$FF = {Q_n\over\sum_{k=1}^N TH_k}$ where $TH_k$ is the theoretical (estimated) production for well k; N is the number of wells; $Q_n$ is the net quantity, the measured and corrected total

In table 2, the field factor is 610,000 over 615,800, equal to 0.99058.

Corrected well allocation

The effect of field factor is to distribute the difference between fiscal measured total and theoretical total, 5,800 bbl, evenly at the same proportion across all wells.

$$WA_k = TH_k * FF$$

=== Probabilistic allocation ===
Probabilistic rate allocation fully exploits the available measurement configuration and knowledge about measurement noise characteristics to achieve a more accurate allocation as well as uncertainty quantification. This is particularly beneficial for allocation accuracy when additional per-well measurements are available, such as the fluid rate per well derived from a rod pump dynamometer card, or (manual) measurements of the per-well water fraction. This method combines measurements taken at different times using a probabilistic dynamic model for the production type curve.

=== Ownership allocation ===
When a fluid stream is owned by a compound ownership, each owner's equity is allocated in accordance with their share. For joint venture contractual arrangement with fixed equities, allocation is in the proportion of their share of ownership. Production sharing agreements may lead to further splits into cost oil and profit oil categories.

Example of equity-based allocation with calculations

Three companies A, B, and C cooperate in a joint venture contractual arrangement with fixed equity shares. A production platform "Gecko" exported 235,560 barrels of oil one month. Their equities are 20, 35 and 45 percent respectively, equivalent to the volumes 47,112 bbl, 82,446 bbl, 106,002 bbl for each of the companies.

== See also ==
- Phase transition
- Measurement uncertainty
- Flow assurance
- The thermodynamic equilibrium constant
- Flash evaporation calculations
- Equation of state
- Ideal gas law
- R- Gas constant
- Pipeline transport
