= British Columbia Energy Regulator =

Crown Corporation

Crown Corporation overview
- Preceding Crown Corporation: BC Oil and Gas Commission
- Jurisdiction: British Columbia
- Key document: Energy Resource Activities Act

The British Columbia Energy Regulator (BCER), formerly the BC Oil and Gas Commission, is the Crown Corporation responsible for energy regulation in British Columbia, Canada.

Established in October 1998, it has offices in seven cities: Fort St. John, Fort Nelson, Kelowna, Victoria, Terrace, Dawson Creek, and Prince George.

== Purpose ==
The BCER is defined under the Energy Resource Activities Act. Under this law, the BCER's purposes are to 'regulate energy resource activities in a manner that protects public safety and the environment, support reconciliation with Indigenous peoples and the transition to low-carbon energy, conserve energy resources and foster a sound economy and social well-being.' The BCER's mandate does not extend to regulating consumer gas prices at the pump.

ERAA defines ‘energy resource’ as petroleum, natural gas, hydrogen, methanol or ammonia. The BCER also manages oil and aspects of geothermal resources, with an expanded role in carbon capture and storage (CCS).

== Governance ==
The BCER is accountable to the provincial legislature and the public through the Ministry of Energy, Mines and Low Carbon Innovation.

The BCER is governed by a Board of Directors responsible for providing oversight of the BCER and its operations. The Board consists of five to seven directors and includes Indigenous representation. The current strategic and operational leader of the BCER is Commissioner and Chief Executive Officer Michelle Carr.

== Compliance and enforcement information ==
In 2010–11, the OGC "issued 15 penalty tickets with fines of $575 (the maximum allowed for tickets) or less, which included unlawful water withdrawals and failure to promptly report a spill. Court prosecutions included a $20,000 fine for a Water Act stream violation, $10,575 for another stream violation and $250,0000 for a sour gas release. [...] The commission would not release the names of the companies convicted".

Per the OGC, in 2012, of "more than 800 deficiencies, 80 resulted in charges, largely under the provincial Water Act for the non-reporting of water volumes and a smaller portion under the provincial Environment Management Act. Another 13 resulted in orders under the provincial Oil and Gas Activities Act, 22 in warnings, 76 in letters requiring action and three in referrals to other agencies". Paul Jeakins, OGC commissioner and CEO, has publicly acknowledged that OGC inspection and enforcement reports are "a bit of a gap".

== Lawsuits ==
In November 2013, Ecojustice, the Sierra Club and the Wilderness Committee filed a lawsuit against the OGC and Encana about Encana's water use from lakes and rivers for its hydraulic fracturing for shale gas, "granted by repeated short-term water permits, a violation of the provincial water act". In 2012, the OGC had granted Encana access to 20.4 million cubic metres of surface water, 7 million of which were for fracking and 54% of that were through short-term approvals. In October 2014 the Supreme Court of British Columbia found no violation and dismissed the case.

== Criticism ==
The agency has been criticized to be "too industry-friendly", to have "vague regulations" and to issue non-transparent fracking violation reports. However, the BCER does publicly identify companies convicted of fracking violations online.

The B.C. Ministry of Environment and other Crown corporations of B.C. like WorkSafeBC have reported company names and details of those penalties for years. BCER reports have been available online since 2009.

== See also ==
- History of the petroleum industry in Canada (frontier exploration and development)
- Greater Sierra (oil field) in B.C.
- List of Canadian natural gas pipelines
- List of Canadian oil pipelines
- List of Canadian pipeline accidents
- List of oil spills
- List of largest oil and gas companies by revenue
- Oil and gas law in the United States
- Petroleum fiscal regime
- Pipeline and Hazardous Materials Safety Administration- US counterpart regarding pipelines
