= Joe Walter =

Joseph or Joe Walter may refer to:

- Joseph Walter (1783–1856), British marine artist
- Joe Walter (American football) (born 1963), former American football tackle
- Joe Walter (footballer) (1895–1995), former British professional footballer
- Joe Walter (politician) (born 1947), former member of the Ohio House of Representatives
- Joe C. Walter Jr. (1929–1997), American businessman and philanthropist, founder of independent oil and gas companies
