= Stock-Raising Homestead Act =

1916 US law

- Long title: An Act to provide for stock-raising homesteads, and for other purposes.
- Acronyms (colloquial): SRHA
- Nicknames: Stock-Raising Homestead Act of 1916
- Enacted by: the 64th United States Congress
- Effective: December 29, 1916

Citations
- Public law: 64-290
- Statutes at Large: 39 Stat. 862

Codification
- Titles amended: 43 U.S.C.: Public Lands
- U.S.C. sections created: 43 U.S.C. ch. 7, subch. X § 291 et seq.

Legislative history
- Introduced in the House as H.R. 407 by Scott Ferris (D–OK); Committee consideration by House Public Lands; Signed into law by President Woodrow Wilson on December 29, 1916

The Stock-Raising Homestead Act of 1916 provided settlers 640 acres (260 ha) of public land—a full section or its equivalent—for ranching purposes. Unlike the Homestead Act of 1862 or the Enlarged Homestead Act of 1909, land homesteaded under the 1916 act separated surface rights from subsurface rights, resulting in what later became known as split estates. The subsurface rights, also known as mineral rights, are the foundation of recent oil and gas law in the United States.

Under the act no cultivation of lands was required, but some range improvements were mandated as necessary.

By 2006, the Stock-Raising Homestead Act and subsequent legislation and other legal changes resulted in the federal government administering the subsurface rights to about 700,000,000 acres (280,000,000 ha) of land, 58,000,000 acres (23,000,000 ha) of which have surface rights owned privately or by a U.S. state.

== Text of the Stock-Raising Act ==
CHAP. 9. --An Act To provide for stock-raising homesteads, and for other purposes.

Be it enacted by the Senate and House of Representatives of the United States of America in Congress assembled, That from and after the passage of this Act it shall be lawful for any person qualified to make entry under the homestead laws of the United States to make a stock-raising homestead entry for not exceeding six hundred and forty acres of unappropriated unreserved public land in reasonably compact form: Provided, however, That the land so entered shall theretofore have been designated by the Secretary of the Interior as "stock-raising lands."

SEC. 2. That the Secretary of the Interior is hereby authorized, on application or otherwise, to designate as stock-raising lands subject to entry under this Act lands the surface of which is, in his opinion, chiefly valuable for grazing and raising forage crops, do not contain merchantable timber, are not susceptible of irrigation from any known source of water supply, and are of such character that six hundred and forty acres are reasonably required for the support of a family: Provided, That where any person qualified to make original or additional entry under the provisions of this Act shall make application to enter any unappropriated public land which has not been designated as subject to entry (provided said application is accompanied and supported by properly corroborated affidavit of the applicant, in duplicate, showing prima facie that the land applied for is of the character contemplated by this Act), such application, together with the regular fees and commissions shall be received by the register and receiver of the land district in which said land is located and suspended until it shall have been determined by the Secretary of the Interior whether said land is actually of that character. That during such suspension the land described in the application shall not be disposed of; and if the said land shall be designated under this Act, then such application shall be allowed; otherwise it shall be rejected, subject to appeal; but no right to occupy such lands shall be acquired by reason of said application until said lands have been designated as stock-raising lands.

SEC. 3. That any qualified homestead entryman may make entry under the homestead laws of lands so designated by the Secretary of the Interior, according to legal subdivisions, in areas not exceeding six hundred and forty acres, and in compact form so far as may be subject to the provisions of this Act, and secure title thereto by compliance with the terms of the homestead laws: Provided, That a former homestead entry of land of the character described in section two hereof shall not be a bar to the entry of a tract within a radius of twenty miles from such former entry under the provisions of this Act, subject to the requirements of law as to residence and improvements, which, together with the former entry, shall not exceed six hundred and forty acres: Provided further, That the entryman shall be required to enter all contiguous areas of the character herein described open to entry prior to the entry of any noncontiguous land: Provided further, That instead of cultivation as required by the homestead laws the entryman shall be required to make permanent improvements upon the land entered before final proof is submitted tending to increase the value of the same for stock-raising purposes, of the value of not less than $1.25 per acre, and at least one-half of such improvements shall be placed upon the land within three years after the date of entry thereof.

SEC. 4. That any homestead entryman of lands of the character herein described, who has not submitted final proof upon his existing entry, shall have the right to enter, subject to the provisions of this Act, such amount of contiguous lands designated for entry under the provisions of this Act as shall not, together with the amount embraced in his original entry, exceed six hundred and forty acres, and residence upon the original entry shall be credited on both entries, but improvements must be made on the additional entry equal to $1.25 for each acre thereof.

SEC. 5. That persons who have submitted final proof upon, or received patent for, lands of the character herein described under the homestead laws, and who own and reside upon the land so acquired, may, subject to the provisions of this Act, make additional entry for and obtain patent to contiguous lands designated for entry under the provisions of this Act, which, together with the area theretofore acquired under the homestead law, shall not exceed six hundred and forty acres, on proof of the expenditure required by this Act on account of permanent improvements upon the additional entry.

SEC. 6. That any person who is the head of a family, or who has arrived at the age of twenty-one years and is a citizen of the United States, who has entered or acquired under the homestead laws, prior to the passage of this Act, lands of the character described in this Act, the area of which is less than six hundred and forty acres, and who is unable to exercise the right of additional entry herein conferred because no lands subject to entry under this Act, adjoin the tract so entered or acquired or lie within the twenty mile limit provided for in this Act, may, upon submitting proof that he resides upon and has not sold the land so entered or acquired and against which land there are no encumbrances, relinquish or reconvey to the United States the land so occupied, entered, or acquired, and in lieu thereof, within the same land-office district, may enter and acquire title to six hundred and forty acres of the land subject to entry under this Act, but must show compliance with all the provisions of existing homestead laws except as modified herein.

SEC. 7. That the commutation provisions of the homestead laws shall not apply to any entires made under this Act.

SEC. 8. That any homestead entrymen or patentees who shall be entitled to additional entry under this Act shall have, for ninety days after the designation of lands subject to entry under the provisions of this Act and contiguous to those entered or owned and occupied by him, the preferential right to make additional entry as provided in this Act: Provided, That where such lands contiguous to the lands of two or more entrymen or patentees entitled to additional entries under this section are not sufficient in area to enable such entrymen to secure by additional entry the maximum amounts to which they are entitled, the Secretary of the Interior is authorized to make an equitable division of the lands among the several entrymen or patentees, applying to exercise preferential rights, such division to be in tracts of not less than forty acres, or other legal subdivision, and so made as to equalize as nearly as possible the area which such entrymen and patentees will acquire by adding the tracts embraced in additional entries to the lands originally held or owned by them: Provided further, That where but one such tract of vacant land may adjoin the lands of two or more entrymen or patentees entitled to exercise preferential right hereunder, the tract in question may be entered by the person who first submits to the local land office his application to exercise said preferential right.

SEC. 9. That all entries made and patents issued under the provisions of this Act shall be subject to and contain a reservation to the United States of all the coal and other minerals in the lands so entered and patented, together with the right to prospect for, mine, and remove the same. The coal and other mineral deposits in such lands shall be subject to disposal by the United States in accordance with the provisions of the coal and mineral land laws in force at the time of such disposal. Any person qualified to locate and enter the coal or other mineral deposits, or having the right to mine and remove the same under the laws of the United States, shall have the right at all times to enter upon the lands entered or patented, as provided by this Act, for the purpose of prospecting for coal or other mineral therein, provided he shall not injure, damage, or destroy the permanent improvements of the entryman or patentee, and shall be liable to and shall compensate the entryman or patentee for all damages to the crops on such lands by reason of such prospecting. Any person who has acquired from the United States the coal or other mineral deposits in any such land, or the right to mine and remove the same, may reenter and occupy so much of the surface thereof as may be required for all purposes reasonably incident to the mining or removal of the coal or other minerals, first, upon securing the written consent or waiver of the homestead entryman or patentee; second, upon payment of the damages to crops or other tangible improvements to the owner thereof, where agreement may be had as to the amount thereof; or, third, in lieu of either of the foregoing provisions, upon the execution of a good and sufficient bond or undertaking to the United States for the use and benefit of the entryman or owner of the land, to secure the payment of such damages to the crops or tangible improvements of the entryman or owner, as may be determined and fixed in an action brought upon the bond or undertaking in a court of competent jurisdiction against the principal and sureties thereon, such bond or undertaking to be in form and in accordance with rules and regulations prescribed by the Secretary of the Interior and to be filed with and approved by the register and receiver of the local land office of the district wherein the land is situate, subject to appeal to the Commissioner of the General Land Office: Provided, That all patents issued for the coal or other mineral deposits herein reserved shall contain appropriate notations declaring them to be subject to the provisions of this Act with reference to the disposition, occupancy, and use of the land as permitted to an entryman under this Act.

SEC. 10. That lands containing water holes or other bodies of water needed or used by the public for watering purposes shall not be designated under this Act but may be reserved under the provisions of the Act of June twenty-fifth, nineteen hundred and ten, and such lands heretofore or hereafter reserved shall, while so reserved, be kept and held open to the public use for such purposes under such general rules and regulations as the Secretary of the Interior may prescribe: Provided, That the Secretary may, in his discretion, also withdraw from entry lands necessary to insure access by the public to watering places reserved hereunder and needed for use in the movement of stock to summer and winter ranges or to shipping points, and may prescribe such rules and regulations as may be necessary for the proper administration and use of such lands: Provided further, That such driveways shall not be of greater number or width than shall be clearly necessary for the purpose proposed and in no event shall be more than one mile in width for a driveway less than twenty miles in length, not more than two miles in width for driveways over twenty and not more than thirty-five miles in length and not over five miles in width for driveways over thirty-five miles in length: Provided further, That all stock so transported over such driveways shall be moved an average of not less than three miles per day for sheep and goats and an average of not less than six miles per day for cattle and horses.

SEC. 11. That the Secretary of the Interior is hereby authorized to make all necessary rules and regulations in harmony with the provisions and purposes of this Act for the purpose of carrying the same into effect.

Approved, December 29, 1916.

== Repeal of Stock-Raising Homestead Act of 1916 ==
Sections 291, 300, and 302 were repealed by the enactment of the Federal Land Policy and Management Act of 1976.

== Amendment to Stock-Raising Homestead Act of 1916 ==
Section 299 was amended by the enactment of Public Law 103-23 pertaining to the reservation of coal and mineral rights on April 16, 1993. The legal document referred to as the broad form deed previously severed property into surface and mineral rights. The amendment signed in 1993 required coal and mining companies to do four different things: notify the land owners with a written letter of intent before beginning mining, make a plan that included minimal damages to the land, obtain a letter of consent from the surface owner, and give the land owners a letter promising complete reclamation and compensation.
