= John C. C. Mayo =

American politician and businessman

- Born: John Caldwell Calhoun Mayo; September 16, 1864; Gulnare, Kentucky, US
- Died: 11 May 1914 (aged 49); New York City, US
- Occupations: Entrepreneur, Teacher, Politician
- Political party: Democrat
- Spouse: Alice Jane Meek (m. 1897—1914; his death)
- Children: 2

John Caldwell Calhoun Mayo (September 16, 1864 – May 11, 1914) was an American entrepreneur, educator, and politician. He is known for attracting corporate interest in the coal deposits of Eastern Kentucky and Southwestern Virginia, leading to the development of commercial coal mining in the region. The creation of the broad form deed is also attributed to Mayo in the early 1900s.

== Early life ==
Mayo was born in Gulnare, Kentucky to Thomas Jefferson Mayo and Mary E. Leslie Mayo. His family moved to Johnson County, Kentucky in 1870 from Pike County, Kentucky where they established their home in Paintsville. Mayo attended subscription schools until he enrolled to Kentucky Wesleyan College in Millersburg. He graduated class of 1879 and began teaching school in Paintsville at the age of 22. While attending college, Mayo had realized the potential of coal and other mineral deposits in the Big Sandy Valley.

== Rise to wealth ==
During his teaching tenure, Mayo began to buy land and mineral rights using his teaching salary. He would in turn sell the land or the rights to the land to eastern iron and coal companies at a considerable profit, while convincing them to invest in exploration and mining of the region. Mayo formed a real estate company in 1888 that specialized in acquiring land and mineral rights in Eastern Kentucky and Southwestern Virginia. In 1889, the company became known as the Paintsville Coal and Mining Company. Within two years, the Paintsville Coal and Mining Company owned nearly all of the Elkhorn Creek Coalfield.

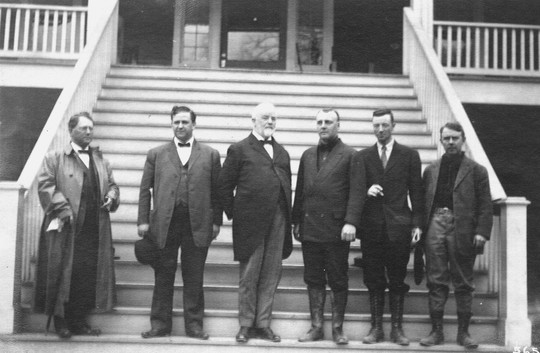
Mayo (left) with other businessmen in front of the Jenkins Hotel

Mayo's land began to increase in value in 1893. After he displayed coal from his land at the Chicago's World Fair, a wealthy businessman named Peter L. Kimberley purchased $10,000 in the company's holdings. This money was used to further expand the land and mineral rights owned by the Paintsville Coal and Mining Company. In 1901, Mayo founded the Northern Coal and Coke Company and transferred his landholdings in Johnson, Floyd, and Lawrence counties in Kentucky into the company. This greatly increased Mayo's wealth as he received $250,000 and 25% in company stocks. The Northern Coal and Coke Company controlled 130,000 acres (530 km^{2}) in the Elkhorn Coal Field when it sold its land holdings and mineral rights to Consolidation Coal Company in 1909.

== Mayo Mansion ==
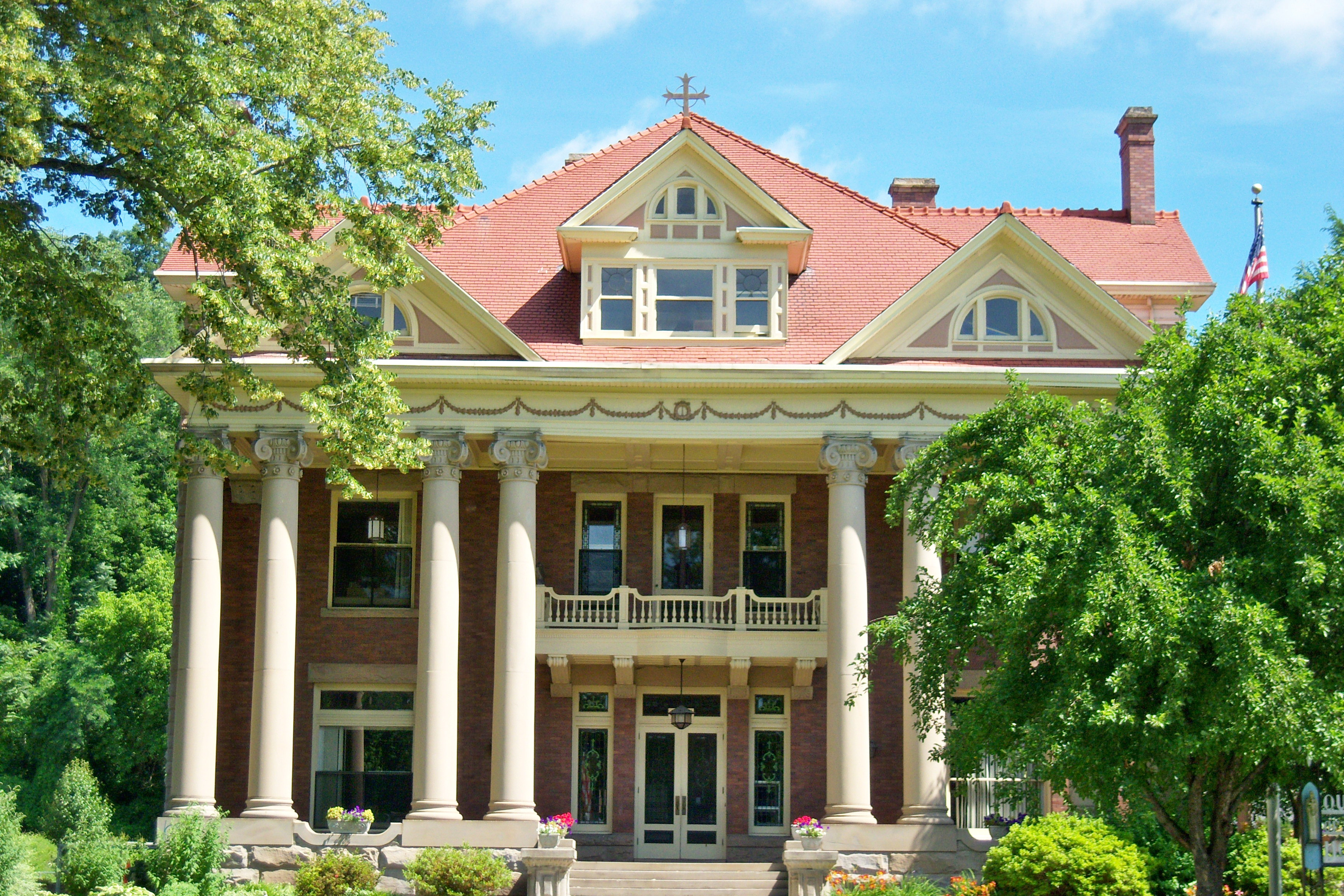
Mayo Mansion

By 1905, Mayo had amassed enough wealth to build a larger home in Paintsville. He had married Alice Jane Meek and they now had two children, John C.C. 2nd and Mary Margaret. Mayo had originally planned a modest twenty room house, but following trips to the Bluegrass region of Kentucky, and having in 1904 acquired Varina Farms, the Powhatan Plantation in Mayo's ancestral Virginia, he decided to build a mansion which would rival those he had seen. His plans were expanded for a classic revival mansion with forty rooms.

Construction broke ground in a swampy area. The construction crews filled in the swampy area and then went to work on building the foundation for the estate. Sandstone used in the foundation was mined from his father's farm on the other side of Paint Creek. The stones were then transported from the farm across a distance of three-quarters of a mile by an overhead tram. The stone columns surrounding the exterior of the mansion were each transported through the creek during dry periods on sleds pulled by twenty-oxen teams. The masonry for the mansion was performed by Italian stonemasons from Cincinnati.

Originally, light was to be provided in the mansion by using carbide gas, but near the end of construction, Paintsville received electrical service. The plans for the mansion were changed to include electrical wiring. The mansion was also designed to include running water, by pumping water from a well to a cistern and then to the house as required. Rain water from the gutters went into the cistern and in turn to the house also. Construction of the mansion was completed in December 1912 with costs in excess of $250,000 ($8.34 million in 2025 dollars). Mayo Mansion was added to the National Register of Historic Places on May 3, 1974.

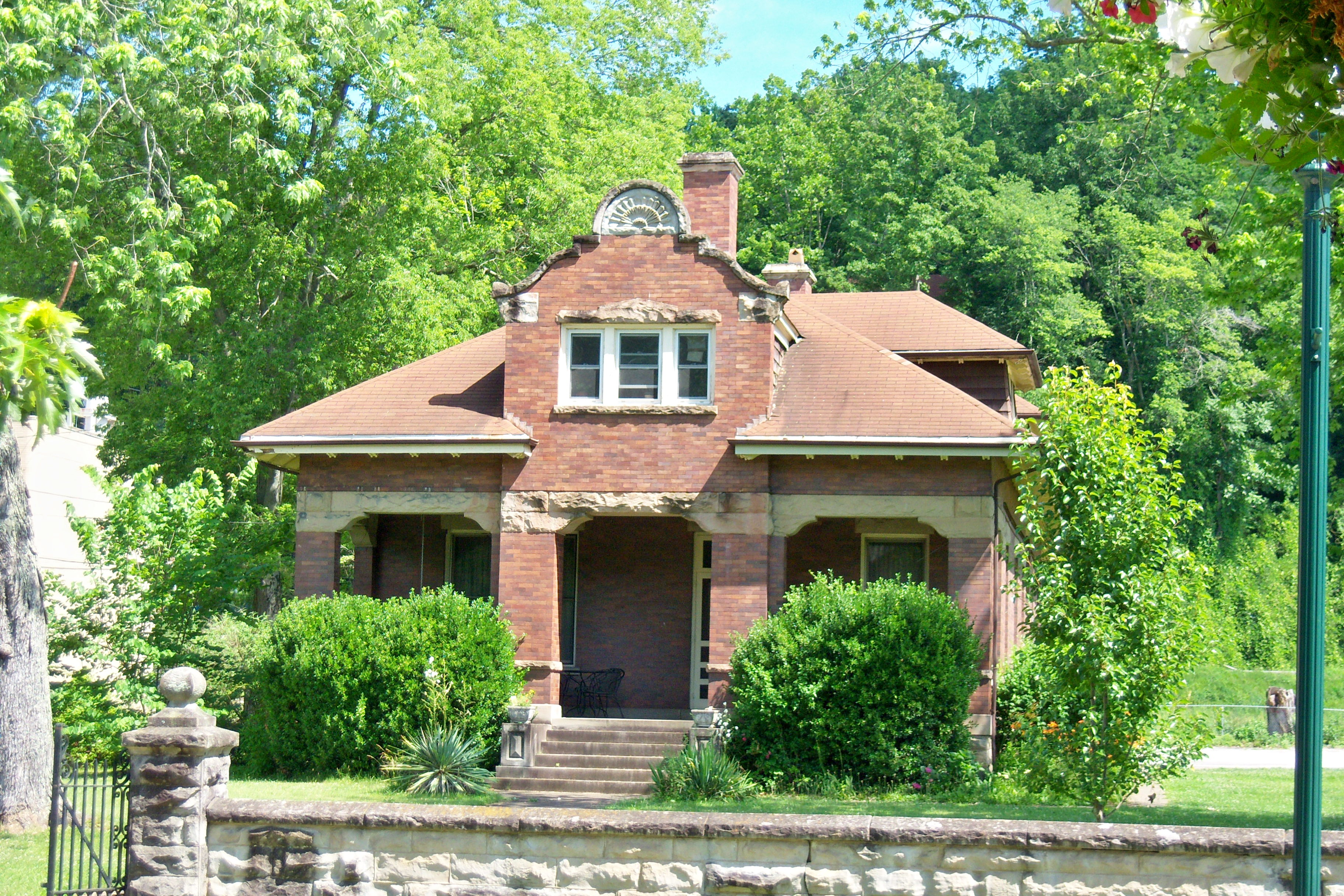
Mayo's office in Paintsville

== Politics ==
Mayo was a millionaire by 1910, and he was already exerting political influence. He used portions of his wealth to help elect governors and congressmen. He also contributed heavily to the presidential campaign of Woodrow Wilson. He is the only eastern Kentuckian to ever be a member of the Democratic National Committee.

== Final years ==
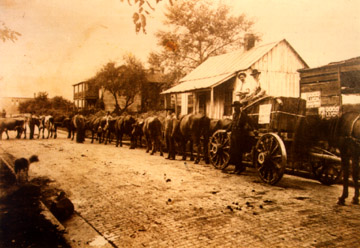
The procession of Mayo

In 1913, Mayo went on a three-month tour of Europe, including London and other foreign capitals. This tour was a trip of both business and pleasure. On August 20, he returned to Paintsville. An elaborate reception was given by John E. Buckingham, a close friend of Mayo. Citizens from all over the area went to welcome back "Johnson County's most prominent resident". Unknown to the guests at the reception, Mayo was already suffering from Bright's Disease. It was soon released to the public that Mayo was ill.

Originally, the newspapers reported that Mayo had pneumonia and was resting at his mansion. Mayo didn't stay resting for long. A week later, Mayo conducted business as usual, but citizens of Paintsville could tell he was seriously ill.

Specialists were soon called in from Cincinnati. Mayo had been experiencing periods of unconsciousness according to reports. Bright's Disease had attacked the function of the liver, but news reports were still hopeful for a quick recovery. On March 1, 1914, Mayo was taken by special train to the Jewish Hospital in Cincinnati, where an entire floor was occupied.

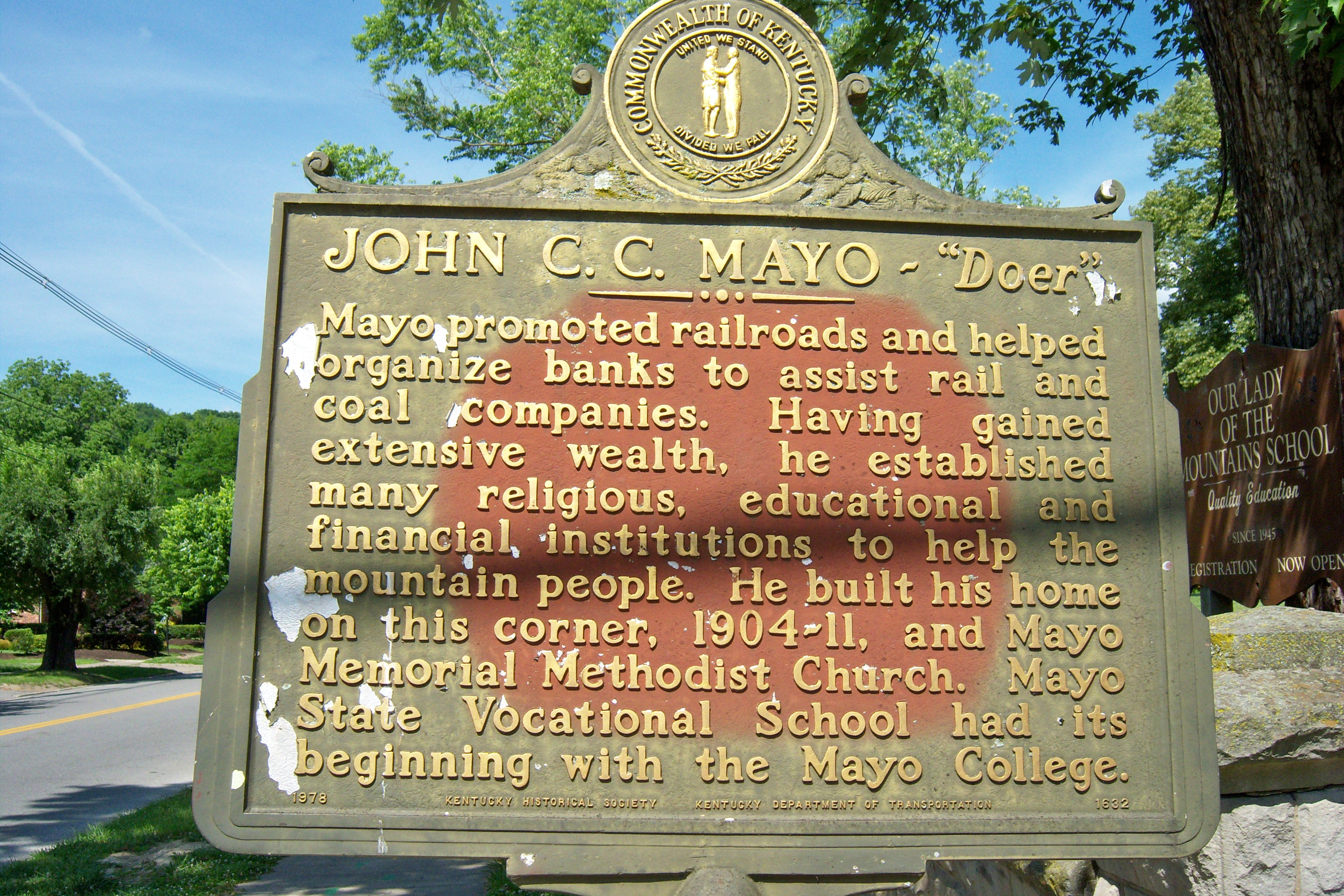
Historical marker in Paintsville commemorating the life of Mayo.

Bulletins were issued almost daily on Mayo's condition, often conflicting. In late April, Mayo was finally moved to the Waldorf Astoria in New York City where another group of specialists were in wait to care for him. On May 9, it was announced that Mayo had developed peritonitis. He died two days later, on May 11, 1914, at the Waldorf Astoria, which is now the site of the Empire State Building.

Nearly 5,000 people attended his funeral on May 14, 1914. Funeral services were held at what is now known as Mayo Memorial United Methodist Church, the same church that Mayo had built just across the street from his mansion and to which Andrew Carnegie had donated the pipe organ. The governor of the Commonwealth, James B. McCreary, brought a delegation of state officials to Mayo's funeral. Senator Clarence Wayland Watson and Representative C. Bascom Slemp represented the U.S. Congress. Citizens of Johnson County held a vigil at the train station until the train carrying Mayo's body pulled into the terminal. Mayo's body was transported to Mayo Mansion to lie in state. From the announcement of Mayo's death on May 11, until after the funeral, all of the towns businesses and banks were closed.

At the time of his death, Mayo was the wealthiest person in the state of Kentucky with US $20 million in assets ($643 million in 2025 dollars).
