= Claim jumping =

Claim jumping may refer to:

- Claim jumping (gold rush)
- Squatting
