= Broad form deed =

Type of legal document

As a legal document, the broad form deed severs a property into surface and mineral rights. This allows other individuals or organizations other than the land owners to purchase rights to resources below the surface. These parties also receive use of surface resources – such as wood or water – to facilitate gathering the resources below ground. Based on English legal theory but an American creation from the early 1900s, the broad form deed was used by land and coal companies in many states within the Appalachian Region.

== Early history ==
=== Details ===
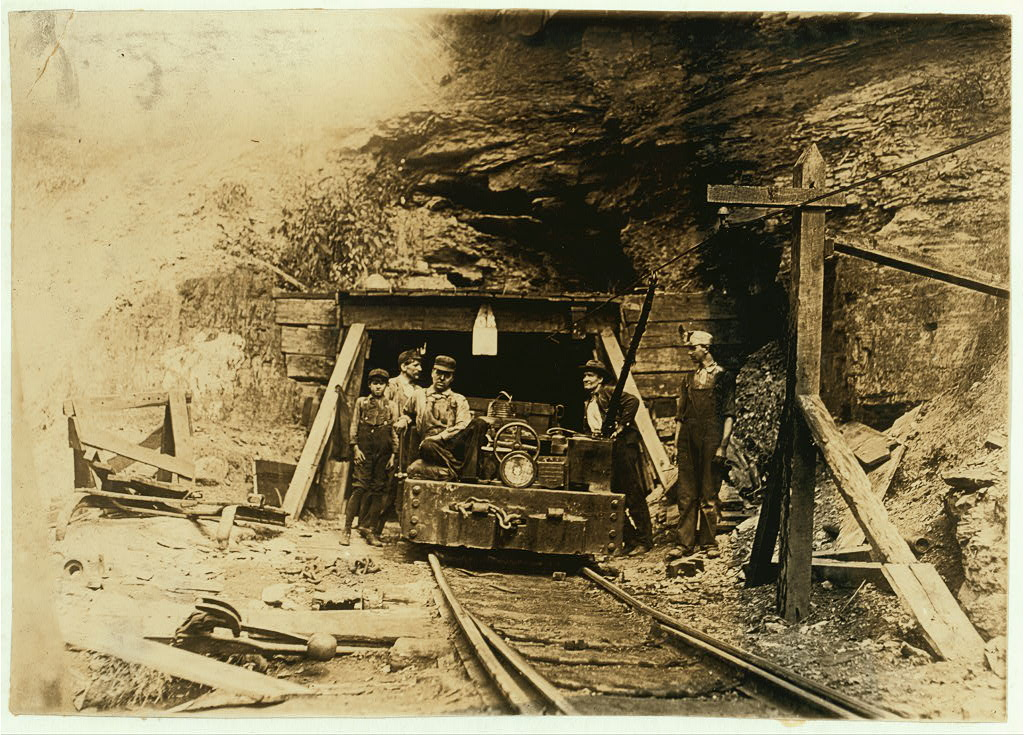
1908 drift coal mine in West Virginia. Photograph by Lewis Hine.

An American creation, the broad form deed did more than just transfer the title of all the mineral rights along with mining rights. The holder was also granted rights to do what they deemed necessary to locate minerals, create any infrastructure needed to amass and relocate the minerals, utilize any resources on the land for mining purpose (like trees or water), and allowed the holder to not be held liable over any damages or the condition of the land and water during or after mining. Views of land ownership at the time typically considered the owner to own from the center of the Earth to the sky above. The broad form deed altered this view legally which bears the question of what legal precedent was in place that allowed for this severance to occur.

=== Royal mines ===
The broad form deed is based on the premise of severing the surface and mineral rights of property. The precedence of this idea comes from English legal theory. In this theory the King retained rights to various minerals on landowners estates for the purposes of maintaining the operations of the country and as such the King had authority to mine for those minerals. This precedence goes back to at least 1567 when the Earl of Northumberland disputed the Queen of England's right to minerals on his estate. Many charters for American colonies included clauses dedicating specified amounts of precious metals to the crown. After the American Revolution states sought control of mineral rights, however laws regarding control and ownership of mineral rights shifted and changed over time. Pressure for materials to fuel the industrial revolution resulted in development of new applications of estate severance based on the previous concepts; this included the broad form deed.

=== Early impact of purchased rights ===
The selling of mineral rights began before the creation of the broad form deed. During the late 1880s in East Tennessee the people that lived in the mountains were reported to be hospitable and open with the mineral buyers and travelers. This shifted to hostility by 1900 as they considered some methods by the companies to acquire land to be deceitful. An example of practices that distanced the locals was that of gaining the land by forcing the land to be sold at public auction. They did this by purchasing rights to land from one of several heirs and upon the other heirs refusing to sell using the court system to force the land to be sold.

=== John CC Mayo creates deed ===
John C.C. Mayo

As schoolteacher from rural eastern Kentucky, John CC Mayo managed to accumulate quite a bit of wealth by purchasing mineral rights. He began by entering into a partnership with two other men in 1892 after combining funds. Using deed books and knowledge gained from the Kentucky Wesleyan College library, Mayo was able to determine those who had property over the most promising mineral deposits and started making deals. These options or "agreement to purchase" depended on him gaining the capital to complete purchases within the specified time-frame. Over the years he had successes acquiring land and worked with many coal and steel companies to get the railroads into the area so that mining could be profitable. After facing controversy in Virginia over how land was acquired, Mayo crafted the broad form deed so that the companies he worked for more securely held the rights to mine the minerals.

== 1950s–1990s ==
=== 1950s ===
As technology progressed during the 1950s, the broad form deed became a controversial issue especially in Kentucky and Tennessee; machines became more advanced and could mine large portions of land. Over the next few decades complaints about the broad form deed inspired state legislators to make changes to protect Kentucky's surface land owners. In the 1956 case of Buchanan v. Watson, the Supreme Court of Kentucky established that damages made by modern mining techniques would not be assessed and granted the removal of all minerals on estates.

=== 1960s ===
The controversy of the broad form deed continued into the 1960s as environmentalists and land owners continued to protest the deed. In the 1968 case Martin v. Kentucky Oak Mining Co., the 1956 Buchanan decision was upheld as the court decided “the mineral owner bought and paid for the right to destroy the surface... to remove the minerals”. In Judge Edward Hill dissenting opinion, he stated that “I am shocked and appalled that the court of last resort in the beautiful state of Kentucky would … lend its approval and encouragement to the diabolical devastation and destruction of a large part of the surface … 'without compensation to the owners thereof”.

=== 1970s ===
Almost 18 years after the 1956 Buchanan decision the disagreement between the split estate owners continued. Environmentalists and activists continued to push for strong legislation and the abolishment of the broad form deed. State legislators had yet to change or abolish the deed until the 1974 Watson v. Kenlick Coal Co. case. This case ruled that if the mineral owners wanted to mine on the split estate they needed to request permission from the surface owners first. However, only months after the Kenlick decision, in the case Department for Natural Resources and Environment v. No. 8 Ltd it was decided that the Kenlick decision was unconstitutional. The legislators found that police powers to invade a citizen's private home did not extend unless the situation threatened the land owner's welfare and health.

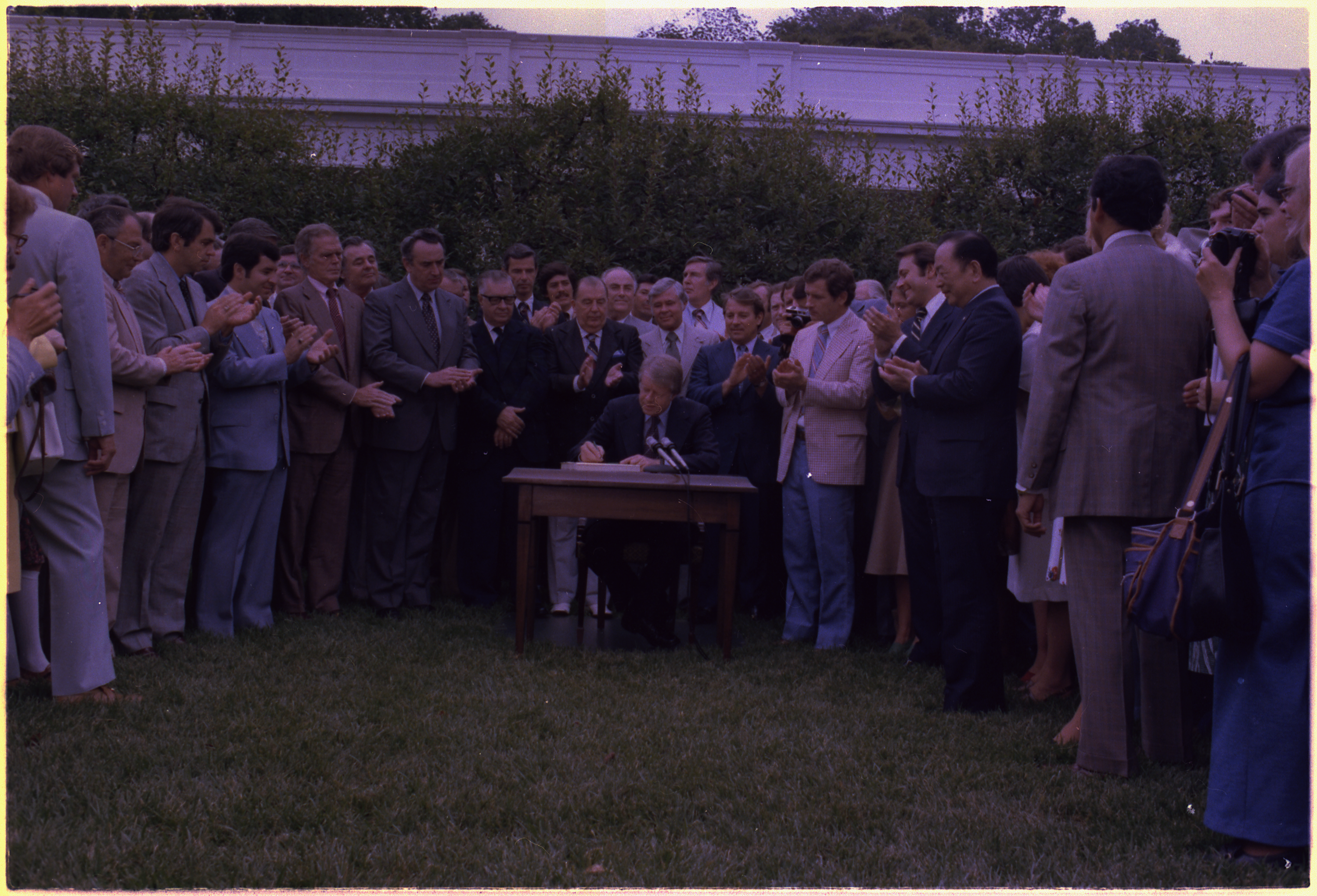
Jimmy Carter signing the Surface Mining Control and Reclamation Act into law

By 1976, the federal government was working on legislation that would place restrictions on strip mining. After decades of disagreement, the federal government signed the Surface Mining Control and Reclamation Act (SMCRA) in 1977, which placed restrictions on coal mining and strip mining in the United States. In response to SMCRA, Tennessee enacted the Tennessee Surface Owner Protection Act in 1977. This act stated that the method used for mineral extraction should be the same methods commonly used at the time of the broad form deed.

=== 1980s ===
In 1981, a disagreement between a mining company and local residents in White County, TN was taken to the Tennessee Supreme Court. This case, Doochin v. Rackley was the result of a mine company's effort to strip mine local lands that were home to local citizens. The court ruled in favor of the defendants because strip mining was not specifically allowed in deed. In contrast to the decision made in the No. 8 LTD (1975) case, the United States Supreme Court found that strip mining was unhealthy for the environment and therefore posed a threat to human life.

Almost a decade after the Kenlick decision was reversed the Kentucky General Assembly responded by creating the Mineral Deed Act of 1984. This act stated that the mineral owner could only operate a mine within the methods that were established at the time the deed was originally signed by the mineral and estate owner; that period of time is referred to as mineral severance. However, later in 1987, the Mineral Deed Act was overturned by the case Akers v. Baldwin. In Akers v. Baldwin it was ruled that the Mineral Deed Act was unconstitutional because it violated the separation of powers and it “disturbed the Buchanan decision”. In the courts opinion, there may have been a “legitimate public purpose that motivated the passage of this legislation". A year after the Mineral Deed Act was overturned the citizens of Kentucky voted for a broad form deed amendment. The amendment passed with a margin of 4 to 1 and restricted coal companies from strip mining on the split without the permission from the surface owner.

=== 1990s ===
In 1993, President Clinton signed an amendment to the Stock Raising Homestead Act, discussing split estates which required companies to do four things: notify the land owners with a written letter of intent before beginning mining, create a plan that included minimal damages to the land, obtain a letter of consent from the surface owner, and give the land owners a letter promising complete reclamation and compensation.

Many court cases between surface and mineral owners have resulted in changes to split estate regulations. For example, in the 1997 court case Gerrity Oil & Gas Corp. vs. Magness, it was ruled that the surface and mineral owners must be in compliance with each other's required use of land when using the estate in question, often requiring the mineral rights owner to change their plans of use of the surface to "accommodate the surface estate owner."

== Legacy: the split estate ==
The broad form deed is no longer used today, but many similar agreements were and still are created to separate mineral and surface rights. Today, a split estate occurs when one person or group owns the surface rights and another person or group owns the mineral rights. Often, in these situations, the right to access the minerals holds precedence over the surface owner's rights. The U.S. Department of the Interior's Bureau of Land Management has policies for split estates, applying only if the surface rights are privately owned and if the mineral rights are publicly owned and regulated by the Federal Government. If the mineral rights are not managed by the Federal Government, a lease agreement is arranged between the land and mineral owners and sometimes a surface use agreement is also created.

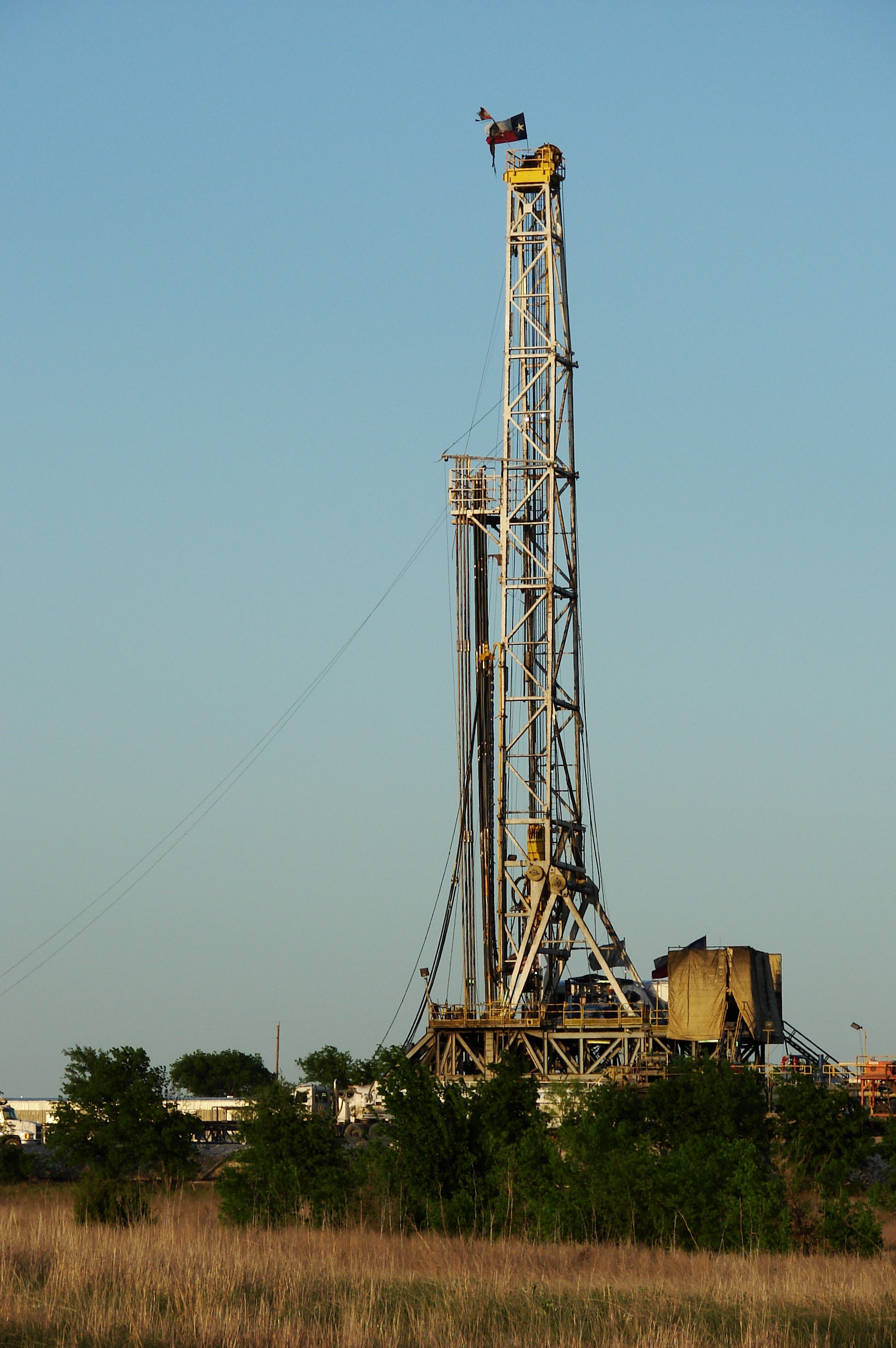
Oil and gas drilling rig

Resources including oil and shale gas are commonly extracted, but depending on the technology used, come with a high risk of contaminating the surface owner's land. Older oil and gas wells were less complicated than modern mining and fracking methods, used less water, and were not as harmful to the environment because of less waste production. However, shale gas fracking techniques produce wastewater which can be worse for the land above. The wastewater produced from fracking often contains salt, industrial chemicals, hydrocarbons, and radioactive material. The main concerns for the waste produced from shale gas fracking is for the water quality, human health, and the overall quality of life.

The waste produced from fracking has affected land and water on the surface. In 2009, seventeen cattle were found dead near a fracking site in Louisiana, resulting in a fine to the company. The conclusion of this case stated that waste had leaked from the mining well and contaminated the pasture. There have been more cases of spilled fracking fluid in 2009 in Hopewell Township and Dunkard Creek Pennsylvania, both resulting in the death of many fish and amphibians, to name a few. As of 2011, some shale gas had been discovered in highly populated areas, therefore creating a higher chance of pollution to the water supply.

Safely disposing of large amounts of wastewater from natural gas and oil production is often difficult because it often contains significant amounts of "salinity, toxic metals, and salinity." In a study by the Division of Earth and Ocean Sciences published in 2013, the water quality of surface waters near a wastewater treatment plant in Pennsylvania was tested. The plant, along with others, sometimes would treat oil and gas wastewater at brine treatment facilities and releasing it into nearby streams. The water tested was shown to contain high levels of "chloride and bromide, strontium, radium, oxygen, and hydrogen isotopic compositions."
