= Oil and gas (disambiguation) =

Oil and gas are two commonly associated fossil fuels. The phrase may refer to:

- Oil and gas field
- Oil and gas law in the United States

== See also ==
- Gasoline or petrol
- Heating oil
- Hydrocarbon exploration
- Natural gas
- Petroleum industry
- Petroleum (crude oil)
