= Petroleum fiscal regime =

National regulatory framework on economic benefits from petroleum production

The petroleum fiscal regime of a country is a set of laws, regulations and agreements which governs the economical benefits derived from petroleum exploration and production. The regime regulates transactions between the political entity and the legal entities involved. A commercial or legal entity in this context is commonly an oil company, and two or more companies may establish partnerships to share economic risks and investment capital.

Although petroleum, oil and gas, and hydrocarbons are not technically mineral resources, the term mineral rights is used to denote rights to exploit oil and gas resources from the underground. Onshore, in United States, the landowner possesses exclusive rights for mineral rights, elsewhere generally the state does. For this reason, the fiscal regime of US is divergent from that of other countries. The petroleum licensing system of a country may be considered interwoven with the fiscal regime, however, a licensing system has its distinct function: to grant rights for petroleum exploration and production to commercial entities.

Because each country has distinctive legislation, there are theoretically just as many different fiscal regimes as there are countries in the world with petroleum resources, but the regimes can still be categorized based on their common characteristics.

== Motivation for petroleum taxes ==
Motivation for introducing special taxes on petroleum production is rooted in rent theory and the assumption that oil and gas resources provide an extraordinary rate of resource rent (economic rent). The term "resource rent" expresses the difference between the values of hydrocarbons extracted from a deposit and the total costs of exploring and producing the hydrocarbons, synonymous with excess profit. Resource rents will be distributed among the state and the oil companies engaged in extracting hydrocarbons in a license. The rents must recover costs undertaken by the companies, give some company profit and give income for the state (in US the landowner) to compensate for the takeout of natural resources. Income tax and special petroleum tax to the state may also apply and carried by the resource rents.

== Elements of fiscal regimes ==
For most countries, a selection of the elements of fees and taxes listed below applies, very few countries, if any, have implemented all elements.

Bonuses

There are different flavours: signature bonus, discovery bonus, first oil sales, production bonus.

Signature bonus is a onetime fee for the assignment and securing of a license, paid irrespective of economic success for the contractor or licensee. Not all states use bonuses, but the government may charge a minor fee for handling license applications.

Corporate tax

Corporate tax is the standard company income tax used in many countries, and will similarly apply to oil companies.

Royalties

Royalties are shares of the extracted hydrocarbons entitled to the host state. The state can agree with the licensees to take it in kind or in cash. This arrangement applies to both crude oil and to natural gas, both in concessionary and contractual license systems.

Production shares

The body of a production sharing contract layouts the production share between the contractor(s) and the state or its state-owned oil company. Typically, most of the early production will be set aside for recovering the costs incurred during development by the contractor (cost oil), while the state receive an increasing share of production after costs are recovered (profit oil).

This is a specific contractual license system arrangement.

Surface fee

Surface fee is a yearly fee, paid per square kilometre or square mile occupied by the license or leased area. This type of fee is used in Brazil for the exploration phase, and for large production volumes, named "Occupation or Retention Fees". In the Norwegian fiscal regime, it is known as area rental fee and is only paid for "passive licenses", and for exploration areas before a Plan for Development and Operations is submitted to the government. If an oil company has found all or parts of an exploration area of little interest, the area can be relinquished to the state, to save expenses for fees. Other countries enjoying surface fee include Algeria, Angola, Benin, Cameroon, Mauritania.

=== More country specific elements ===
Special petroleum tax

This is a concessionary license system taxation, to tax a high proportion of the resource rent. In the United Kingdom, it is known as Petroleum revenue tax (PRT), where a 50% tax is accounted for income from each oil field. In Norway, special tax can be up to 50% on top of 28% corporate tax, however, the income and taxes are calculated for the entire portfolio of fields in which the company participates, and losses can be carried forward from previous years. In this way, profit from one oil field can be balanced against loss on another field, which lowers the maximum tax burden.

Ring Fence Corporation Tax (RFCT)

This is country specific for UK, it is a tax of 30%. A 'ring fence' prevents taxable profits from being reduced by losses that the oil company experiences from other activities.

Environment fees

According to Norwegian fiscal regime, a CO_{2} tax is paid per volume liquids and gas burnt or emitted directly to air on the continental shelf. It is classified as a deductible operating cost, hence reducing the other taxes paid to the state.

State's Direct Financial Interest

An example of a unique implementation of government take is State's Direct Financial Interest (SDFI), the Norwegian state directly owned shares of exploration and production licenses on the Norwegian continental shelf. Although SDFI gives a take effect similar to royalties, it is not classified as royalties by the government, reasoned by that this arrangement also commits the state to contribute in investments with the same proportion of capital as they take out their share of the revenues.

== Petroleum licensing systems ==
Petroleum licensing systems

- Types
  - Concessionary system
  - Contractual system
    - Production sharing contract
    - Service
      - Pure service contract
      - Risk service contract
    - Buyback contract
    - Technical assistance contract

Partnerships of companies may apply to either type of licensing system

Within fiscal regimes where the state owns the mineral rights, the governments have generally selected one of two types of licensing system: a concessionary system or a contractual system.

=== Concessionary systems ===
The principle of the concessionary license system is that the state transfers its ownership of resources in the subsurface to a commercial entity, often a partnership of companies. The companies obtain exclusive rights to extract crude oil and natural gas in a defined area for a limited time. If more than one company are assigned a license, the government will provide a joint operating agreement which states each partners equity share. One of the companies is often assigned the operator role, who carry out the actual work on behalf of the group.

=== Contractual systems ===
In contractual systems, the state retains its ownership to hydrocarbon resources. A commercial entity, the contractor company, is being engaged to extract petroleum according to some contract. The countries using this type of systems, often have their state-owned oil company to represent the interests of the state. As of concessionary systems, more than one oil company can make partnerships in the license. Most used variants of contract:

- Production sharing contracts - The contractor receives his compensation in terms of raw materials taken from the ground, oil and / or gas.
- Service contracts - Generally, the contractors are paid in cash for their services, in pure service contacts there are agreed a fixed compensation, while in risk service contracts the contractor accepts to share risks by linking his compensation to the success of the project.
- Buyback contracts - The contracts have an option for the contractor to buy petroleum produced by the project at some defined terms. This type of contract is in use in Iran.
- Technical assistance contracts - This is a type of contract used for development projects on oil fields already in production, the purpose of a project may be to enhance the production facilities, to add on extra infrastructures etc.

== Sources ==
- Johnston, Daniel (1 January 1994). International petroleum fiscal systems and production sharing contracts. PennWell Books. ISBN 978-0-87814-426-6.
- Muhammed, Mazeel (2 September 2010). Petroleum Fiscal Systems and Contracts. Diplomica Verlag. ISBN 978-3-8366-8852-9.
