= Ringfencing =

Financial management technique

In business and finance, ringfencing or ring-fencing occurs when a portion of a company's assets or profits are financially separated without necessarily being operated as a separate entity. This might be for:

- regulatory reasons
- creating asset protection schemes with respect to financing arrangements
- segregating into separate income streams for taxation purposes
- avoiding sanctions against a country.

== Asset protection ==
In asset protection arrangements, ringfencing can be employed through segregating specific assets and liabilities into separate companies of a corporate group. It can also be used as a method for mitigating liquidation risk or to improve a corporate credit rating.

== Separation for tax purposes ==
In the United Kingdom, ringfence profits arise from income and gains from oil extraction activities or oil rights in the UK and UK continental shelf, and are subject to a higher rate of corporation tax. This petroleum fiscal regime can be seen in other countries as well.

== Regulatory separation ==
In the case of loans or bonds, ringfencing generally allows an investor to have both a link to a specific asset they possess (such as wind farms owned by a utility), while also enjoying the full credit support of a utility's balance sheet.

One common form of ringfencing is when a regulated public utility business financially separates itself from a parent company that engages in non-regulated business. This is done mainly to protect consumers of essential services such as power, water and basic telecommunications from financial instability or bankruptcy in the parent company resulting from losses in their open market activities. Ringfencing also keeps customer information within the public utility business private from the for-profit efforts of the parent company's other business.

A high-profile success story with utility ringfencing occurred during the Enron financial meltdown of 2001–2002; Enron had acquired Oregon-based Portland General Electric in 1997, but the local power company was ringfenced by the Oregon Public Utility Commission prior to the acquisition being completed. This protected Portland General Electric's assets, and its consumers, when Enron declared bankruptcy amid massive accounting scandals. There were examples of this in other US states as well.

The largest banks in the United Kingdom are required by the Financial Services (Banking Reform) Act 2013 to ringfence their retail operations in order to increase depositor protection. The ringfencing requirements came into effect on 1 January 2019. The UK bank ringfencing requirements require such retail operations to be operated through separate entities and sub-groups, within each wider bank group. The Prudential Regulation Authority is the lead regulator for ringfencing, with responsibility for identifying which banks are within the scope of the ringfencing legislation and for supervising banks’ implementation of the rules.

== See also ==
- Escrow
- Hypothecation (taxation)
