= Ministry of Energy and Minerals (Alberta) =

Canadian provincial cabinet agency

- The Government of Alberta wordmark

Ministry overview
- Formed: 1986
- Jurisdiction: Province of Alberta
- Minister responsible: Brian Jean, Minister of Energy and Minerals
- Child agencies: Alberta Energy Regulator; Alberta Utilities Commission; Alberta Petroleum Marketing Commission
- Website: www.alberta.ca/energy

The Ministry of Energy is a Cabinet-level agency of the government of the Canadian province of Alberta responsible for coordinating policy relating to the development of mineral and energy resources. It is also responsible for assessing and collecting non-renewable resource (NRR) royalties, freehold mineral taxes, rentals, and bonuses. The Alberta Petroleum Marketing Commission, which is fully integrated with the Department of Energy within the ministry, and fully funded by the Crown, accepts delivery of the Crown's royalty share of conventional crude oil and sells it at the current market value. The current ministry was formed in 1986, but ministries with other names dealing with energy resources go back to the Ministry of Lands and Mines in 1930.

The Alberta Energy and Utilities Board regulated energy resource development, pipelines, transmission lines, and investor-owned electric, water, and natural gas utilities, as well as certain municipality-owned utilities. It reported to the Executive Council through the Ministry of Energy, although it operated and made its formal decisions independently and autonomously. On January 1, 2008 the Alberta Energy and Utilities Board (EUB) was realigned into two separate regulatory bodies:

- the Energy Resources Conservation Board (ERCB), which regulates the oil and gas industry, and
- the Alberta Utilities Commission (AUC), which regulates the utilities industry.

== History ==
In 1984, the Alberta Department of Energy and Natural Resources (ENR), was a complex multi-divisional organization, with a permanent staff of 2, 605 and a budget of $499 million, that was responsible for the management of energy, mineral, forest and fish and wildlife resources as well as public (crown owned lands) which constituted 62% of Alberta's land base. ENR policy was based on the premise that with proper planning and management, land can support a variety of uses, such as, timber, recreation and wildlife. However few were ideally compatible creating a climate of competition and conflict.

In 1986 the Department of Energy and the Department of Forestry, Lands and Wildlife were created. The original resource agencies continued and interdepartmental planning took place under Resource Evaluation and Planning (REAP). The Resource Evaluation and Planning (REAP) division was created in 1976 to provide coordination and data gathering services.

In the 1980s REAP oversaw an integrative planning system using a team approach to decision-making. It was a challenging time of transition. More established agencies like the Alberta Forest Service supported preservation of traditional attitudes and behaviour and felt threatened. By the 1980s Alberta Forest Service had a strong authority system with a military style chain of command and system of ranks. Fish and Wildlife Division were more flexible and less formally structured. Public Lands were more bureaucratic and mechanistic.

The Fish and Wildlife division who emphasized long-term research and monitoring are under the auspices of the Fish and Wildlife Act. Fish and Wildlife division were with the Department of Recreation and Parks before joining Energy and Natural Resources (ENR) in 1979.

The Mineral Resources division had very high status and power because of their client groups, which included the oil and gas industry, who are "powerful actors on the Alberta scene."

In 1982 the Alberta Forest Service had a staff of 765 and a budget of $123 million and the Fish and Wildlife division whose clients were often environmental groups, had 414 positions and $20 million.

== Non-Renewable Resource Royalties ==
Royalty rates in Alberta are based on the price of WTI. That royalty rate is applied to a project's Net Revenue if the project has reached payout or Gross Revenue if the project has not yet reached payout. A project's revenue is a direct function of the price it is able to sell its crude for. Since WCS is a benchmark for oil sands crudes, revenues in the oil sands are discounted when the price of WCS is discounted. Those price discounts flow through to the royalty payments.

The Province of Alberta receives a portion of benefits from the development of energy resources in the form of royalties that fund in part programs like health, education and infrastructure.

In 2006-7 the oil sands royalty revenue was $2.411 billion. In 2007/08 it rose to $2.913 billion and it continued to rise in 2008/09 to $2.973 billion.

In their response to the 2010 competitive review with input from the Canadian Association of Petroleum Producers (CAPP) and the Small Explorers and Producers Association of Canada, Alberta Energy lowered non-renewable resource (NRR) royalty rates.

The rate cuts included,

The current five per cent front-end rate on natural gas and conventional oil will become a permanent feature of the royalty system. The maximum royalty rate for conventional oil will be reduced to 40 per cent, down from the current level of 50 per cent. The maximum royalty rate for conventional and unconventional natural gas will be reduced at higher price levels from 50 to 36 per cent.

In 2010 the oil and gas industry accounted for 30 percent of Alberta's GDP and 147,000 direct jobs. The decision to lower royalty rates to make the NRR industries more competitive was based on the economic argument that the decrease in royalties revenue would be offset by an increase in land sales and tax revenue.

The net result will be a decrease in revenue in 2012-13 of $363 million. This includes a decrease of $785 million in forecast royalty revenues, directly attributable to the changes, partially offset by an increase of $131 million in royalty revenues generated by increased activity, $143 million in land sale revenue and $148 million in tax revenue from increased tax revenue.

Following the revised Alberta Royalty Regime it fell in 2009/10 to $1.008 billion. In that year Alberta's total resource revenue "fell below $7 billion...when the world economy was in the grip of recession."

In February 2012 the Province of Alberta "expected $13.4 billion in revenue from non-renewable resources in 2013-14. By January 2013 the province was anticipating only $7.4 billion. "30 per cent of Alberta's approximately $40-billion budget is funded through oil and gas revenues. Bitumen royalties represent about half of that total." In 2009/10 royalties from the oil sands amounted to $1.008 billion (Budget 2009 cited in Energy Alberta 2009.

In order to accelerate development of the oil sands, the federal and provincial governments more closely aligned taxation of the oil sands with other surface mining resulting in "charging one per cent of a project's gross revenues until the project's investment costs are paid in full at which point rates increased to 25 per cent of net revenue. These policy changes and higher oil prices after 2003 had the desired effect of accelerating the development of the oil sands industry. "A revised Alberta Royalty Regime was implemented on January 1, 2009. through which each oil sands project pays a gross revenue royalty rate of 1% (Oil and Gas Fiscal Regimes 2011:30). Oil and Gas Fiscal Regimes 2011 summarizes the petroleum fiscal regimes for the western provinces and territories. The Oil and Gas Fiscal Regimes described how royalty payments were calculated:

After an oil sands royalty project reaches payout, the royalty payable to the Crown is equal to the greater of: (a) the gross revenue royalty (1% - 9%) for the period, and (b) the royalty percentage (25% - 40%) of net revenue for the period. Effective January 1, 2009 the royalty percentage of net revenue is also indexed to the Canadian dollar price of WTI. It is 25% when the WTI price is less than or equal to $55/bbl, rising linearly to a maximum of 40% when the price reaches $120/bbl. For royalty purposes, net revenue equals project revenue less allowed costs."

— Oil and Gas Fiscal Regimes

When the price of oil per barrel is less than or equal to $55/bbl indexed against West Texas Intermediate (WTI) (Oil and Gas Fiscal Regimes 2011:30)(Indexed to the Canadian dollar price of West Texas Intermediate (WTI) (Oil and Gas Fiscal Regimes 2011:30) to a maximum of 9%). When the price of oil per barrel is less than or equal to $120/ bbl indexed against West Texas Intermediate (WTI) "payout."

Payout refers "the first time when the developer has recovered all the allowed costs of the project, including a return allowance on those costs equal to the Government of Canada long-term bond rate ["LTBR"].

In order to encourage growth and prosperity and due to the extremely high cost of exploration, research and development, oil sands and mining operations pay no corporate, federal, provincial taxes or government royalties other than personal income taxes as companies often remain in a loss position for tax and royalty purposes for many years. Defining a loss position becomes increasingly complex when vertically-integrated multi-national energy companies are involved. Suncor claims their realized losses were legitimate and that Canada Revenue Agency (CRA) is unfairly claiming "$1.2-billion" in taxes which is jeopardizing their operations.

=== Oil Sands Royalty Rates ===
"Bitumen Valuation Methodology (BVM) is a method to determine for royalty purposes a value for bitumen produced in oil sands projects and either upgraded on-site or sold or transferred to affiliates. The BVM ensures that Alberta receives market value for its bitumen production, taken in cash or bitumen royalty-in-kind, through the royalty formula. Western Canadian Select (WCS), a grade or blend of Alberta bitumens, diluents (a product such as naphtha or condensate which is added to increase the ability of the oil to flow through a pipeline) and conventional heavy oils, developed by Alberta producers and stored and valued at Hardisty, AB was determined to be the best reference crude price in the development of a BVM."

Price WTI C $/bbl	Royalty Rate on Gross Revenue	Royalty Rate on Net Revenue
Below C$55	1.00%	5.00%
C$60	1.62%	26.15%
C$75	3.46%	29.62%
C$100	6.54%	35.38%
Above C$125	9.00%	40.00%

By 2014 NRR revenue dropped to 21% of total revenue from 30% in 2010. The 2014 Provincial Budget reported that future anticipated NRR revenue is "far less than in 2011-2012, less than the 30% recorded in 2010 and in the four year period from 2005-06 to 2008-09."

It is forecast at $9.2 billion, $582 million, or 6.7% higher than in 2013-14, with increased bitumen royalties partly offset by lower crude oil royalties. Revenue is forecast to increase by an average of 4.6% in 2015-16 and 2016-17, with substantial growth in bitumen royalties, mainly due to rising production, obscuring decreasing crude oil and natural gas royalties. Resource revenue is expected to reach $10.1 billion by 2016-17, and account for 21% of total revenue.

Budget 2014 forecast that the 2014-2015 West Texas Intermediate (WTI) - Western Canadian Select (WCS)- differential, would be 26% with the WTI price at US$95.22. By December 2014 4 December 2014 WTI had dropped to $US67.25 bbl and WCS to US$50.70 with a differential of 16%.
