= J. C. Walter Jr. =

American businessman (1927–1997)

- Born: October 7, 1927; Houston, Texas, US
- Died: June 14, 1997 (aged 69)
- Occupations: Hydrocarbon exploration and production
- Years active: 1951 1997
- Known for: Walter Oil & Gas
- Spouse: Elizabeth Cowden
- Children: 2

Joseph Charles Walter Jr. (October 7, 1927 – June 14, 1997), also known as J. C. Walters Jr. and Joe C. Walters Jr., was an American businessman and petroleum executive, known for founding Houston Oil & Minerals and Walter Oil & Gas Corporation. He made significant contributions to the global oil and gas industry and had a notable impact on energy exploration. Additionally, Walter was active in philanthropy, particularly education and healthcare, with strong ties to the University of Texas at Austin and the Houston Methodist Hospital system in Houston, Texas.

== Early life and education ==
Joseph Charles Walter Jr. was born on October 7, 1927, in Houston, Texas, to Joseph Charles Walter, Sr., an oil and gas landman, and Gladys Hoskins Walter. He graduated from Lamar High School in Houston before enrolling at the University of Texas at Austin (UT), where he earned a Bachelor of Science in Petroleum Engineering in 1949. Continuing his studies at UT, he completed a Master of Arts in Geology in 1951. His graduate thesis, titled "Paleontology of the Rustler Formation, Culberson County, Texas", focused on identifying Permian invertebrates, and included his identification of a new species of brachiopod, Derbyia sulcata Walter.

== Career ==
=== Early career and businesses ===
Walter began his career with Humble Oil, principally owned by Jersey Standard, where he spent six years refining his skills in evaluating oil reserves. During this time, he married Elizabeth Ann Cowden from Midland, Texas, and the couple had twin children.

==== Houston Royalty Company ====
In 1957, Walter left the corporate world to join his father's business, Houston Royalty Company. After the passing of his father and his business partner, Walter and his associates acquired the company and eventually merged it with Royalties Management Co. from Tulsa, Oklahoma. He took the company public in 1966, renaming the company Houston Oil & Minerals Corporation.

==== Houston Oil & Minerals ====
Houston Oil & Minerals Corporation (HOMC) initiated an "aggressive acquisition" strategy in the late 1960s and early 1970s, and build one of the largest mineral positions in the United States. (Note: According to Walter Oil & Gas' website, HOMC was able to "aggressively" purchase under-valued fields, building a substantial reserve.) The company drilled a series of 14 successful wells into the Frio Formation, producing approximately 1.5 billion cubic feet equivalent (BCFE) of natural gas, which, according to the company, contributed significantly to the company's operations and supported further exploration and development efforts.

By the late 1970s, HOMC had grown to employ 1,400 people across five divisions, with projects in the North Sea, Africa, the Middle East, South America, and Australia.

Walter was diagnosed with heart disease and, in April 1981, underwent a heart transplant at Houston Methodist Hospital.

Nine days after his transplant, Walter completed a merger between HOMC and Tenneco, an American multinational corporation. HOMC became a wholly owed subsidiary of Tenneco. The original HOMC stockholders retained an overriding royalty interest in the oil and gas leases HOMC brought into the merger.

With the merger, Walter stepped away from the business and intended to retire to his ranch. His retirement lasted for less than a month. On May 28, 1981, he founded Walter Oil & Gas.

=== Walter Oil & Gas and Walter International ===
In 1981, Walter started Walter Oil & Gas while the industry was dealing with an oil price downturn. He began by acquiring and drilling plays in North Texas and the Texas and Louisiana Gulf Coast. The next year, he was joined by his geologist son, Joe "Rusty" Walter, III. The company made discoveries in shallow offshore Texas waters at Mustang Island Block 831 and Eugene Island 45/46.

The offshore discoveries set in motion a focus on offshore assets. In 1989, Walter turned over the leadership of the company to his son Rusty. With Rusty as President and CEO, Walter focused on international offshore wildcat opportunities with the formation of Walter International. The new company, in partnership with Walter Oil & Gas, developed Alba Field, the first commercial hydrocarbon field in Equatorial Guinea, with reserves of over 1 billion barrels of oil equivalent (BBOE). After Walter's death, Walter International merged with CMS Nomeco.

Walter was involved in the Houston business community while running Walter Oil & Gas and Walter International, including serving as president of the Petroleum Club of Houston.

== Philanthropy and community engagement ==
Walter was involved in philanthropic efforts, especially in healthcare and education.

He gave his time and money to support the Houston Methodist Hospital system. It was at Houston Methodist Hospital that he received his heart transplant. Walter served on the hospital's board for 30 years, until his death in 1997. Acknowledging his contributions, the hospital named the J.C. Walter Jr. Transplant Center in his honor.

His donations to the University of Texas at Austin included funding for endowed chairs, professorships, and scholarships in engineering and geology. Walter received several accolades from the University of Texas, including Distinguished Graduate awards in Engineering (1977) and Geology (1984), as well as the Distinguished Alumnus honor in 1985. In 1995, he was inducted into the Hall of Honor by the College of Natural Sciences, and in recognition of his family's contributions, the university established the J.C. Walter Jr. and E.C. Walter Geology Library Endowment.

== Personal life ==
In his personal life, Walter was interested in outdoor activities, including hunting on his farm near Brownwood, Texas, and woodworking. He remained active in his professional and philanthropic endeavors until his death on June 14, 1997.

== Legacy ==
=== Walter Oil & Gas ===
Walter Oil & Gas, the oil and gas exploration company that Walter founded in 1981, became one of the largest private oil companies in the U.S. After Walter's death, his children Joseph "Rusty" Walter, III and Carole Walter Looke, inherited the company.

=== Walter family donations to the University of Texas ===
- Seven endowed chairs, professorships, and scholarships in Engineering and Geology
- J.C. Walter Jr. and E.C. Walter Geology Library Endowment
- The Jackson School of Geosciences Walter Awards
- Renovation funding for the Walter Geology Library

=== Houston Methodist Hospital ===
- The J.C. Walter Jr. Transplant Center, Houston Methodist Hospital, was named in honor of J.C. Walter Jr.
