= Mayo Memorial United Methodist Church (Paintsville, Kentucky) =

Historic church in Kentucky, United States

- Mayo Methodist Church
- U.S. National Register of Historic Places
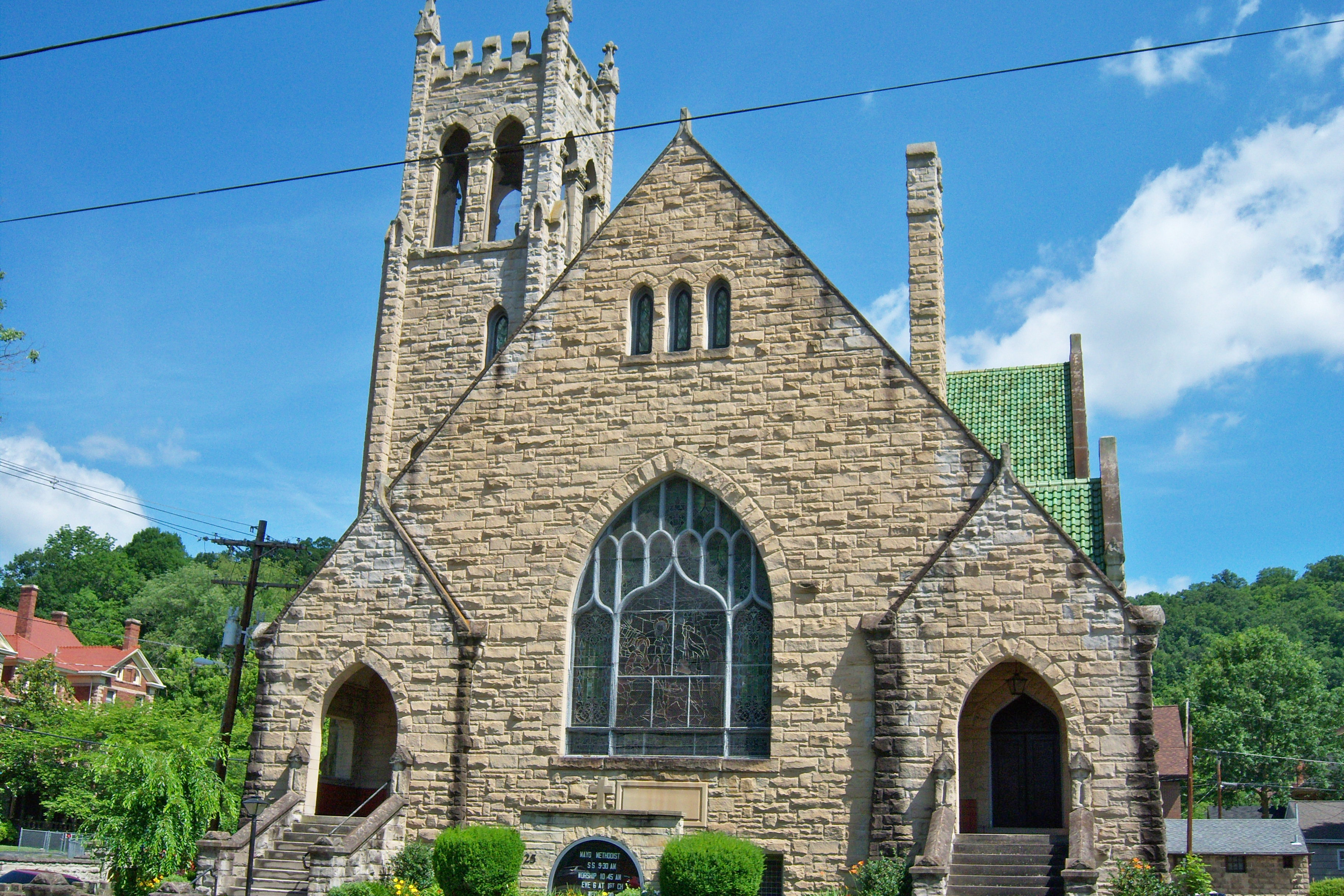

- Location within Kentucky Location within the United States
- Location: Paintsville, Kentucky
- Coordinates: 37°48′57″N 82°48′26″W
- Built: 1909
- Architect: W.A. Adams
- Architectural style: Late Gothic Revival
- NRHP reference No.: 88003152
- Added to NRHP: January 26, 1989

Mayo Memorial United Methodist Church is a historic church located at 325 Third Street, Paintsville, Kentucky, United States. On January 26, 1989, the church was added to the National Register of Historic Places.

== History ==
The construction of the church began in 1908, at the urging of local millionaire, John C.C. Mayo, who was part of the Methodist Episcopal Church, South of Paintsville. Originally the cost of the church was estimated at $10,000, which Mayo promised to pay half of. Initially, he donated a site at the corner of Church and Third Streets for the church. But, he later purchased a site from C.B. Wheeler at the corner of Third and Court Streets, the present location.

The church was constructed out of native sandstone that was cut and shaped at Thomas Jefferson Mayo's (John Mayo's father) farm, which was located across Paint Creek. The stones were transported to the church by the same aerial tram which Mayo used to construct his mansion. The roof is made of over 12,000 glazed green tiles that weigh six pounds a piece. Its pipe organ was donated by Andrew Carnegie. The church is also well known for its large stained glass windows, designed by Italian craftsman and imported from Italy. The windows portray the Birth, Death, Resurrection, and Ascension of Christ.

At the end of construction, the total cost of the church was between $30,000 and $50,000 ($1.79 million in 2025 dollars). The first church service was held on September 19, 1909.

== See also ==
- John C. C. Mayo
- Mayo Mansion
