= Multiphase flow meter =

Device

A multiphase flow meter is a flow meter device used to measure the individual constituent phases in a given fluid. It has applications in the oil and gas industry), where oil, water and gas are initially mixed in a multiphase flow during the oil production processes.

== Background ==
Knowledge of the individual fluid flow rates of a producing oil well is required to facilitate reservoir management, field development, operational control, flow assurance and production allocation.

== Conventional Solutions ==
Conventional solutions concerning two- and three-phase metering systems require expensive and cumbersome test separators, with associated high maintenance, and field personnel intervention. These conventional solutions do not lend themselves to continuous automated monitoring or metering. Moreover, with diminishing oil resources, oil companies are now frequently confronted with the need to recover hydrocarbons from marginally economical reservoirs. In order to ensure economic viability of these accumulations, the wells may have to be completed subsea, or crude oil from several wells sent to a common production facility with excess processing capacity. The economic constraints on such developments do not lend themselves to the continued deployment of three-phase separators as the primary measurement devices. Consequently, viable alternatives to three-phase separators are essential. Industry's response is the multiphase flow meter (MPFM).

== Historical Development ==
The oil and gas industry began to be interested in developing MPFMs in the early 1980s, as measurement technology improved, and wellhead separators were costly. Depleting oil reserves, (More water and gas in the produced oil) along with smaller, deeper wells with higher water contents, saw the advent of increasingly frequent occurrences of multiphase flow where the single-phase meters were unable to provide accurate answers. After a lengthy gestation period, MPFMs capable of performing the required measurements became commercially available. Much of the early research was done at the Christian Michelsen research center in Bergen, Norway, and this work spawned a number of spin off companies in Norway leading to the Roxar / Emerson, Schlumberger, Framo, and MPM meters. ENI and Shell supported the development in Italy of the Pietro Fiorentini meter. Haimo introduced a meter with partial separation, making accurate measurement simpler, but at the expense of a physically larger device. Norway has remained a technology center for MPFM with the Norwegian Society for Oil and Gas Measurement (NFOGM) providing an academic and educational role. Since 1994, MPFM installation numbers have steadily increased as technology in the field has advanced, with substantial growth witnessed from 1999 onwards. A recent study estimated that there were approximately 2,700 MPFM applications including field allocation, production optimisation and mobile well testing in 2006.

A number of factors have instigated the recent rapid uptake of multiphase measurement technology: improved meter performances, decreases in meter costs, more compact meters enabling deployment of mobile systems, the need for sub sea metering, increases in oil prices and a wider assortment of operators. As the initial interest in multiphase flow metering came from the offshore industry, most of the multiphase metering activity was concentrated in the North Sea. However, the present distribution of multiphase flow meters is much more diverse.

Most modern meters combine a venturi flow rate meter, with a gamma densitometer, and some meters have additional measurements for water salinity. The meter measures the flow rates at line pressures, which are typically orders of magnitude greater than atmospheric pressure, but the meter must report the oil and gas volumes at standard (atmospheric) pressure and temperature. The meter must thus know the Pressure / Volume / Temperature properties of the oil, to add to the measured gas rate at line pressure the additional gas that would be liberated from the oil at atmospheric pressure, and also know the loss in oil volume from the release of that gas in conversion to standard conditions. With co-mingled flow from oil zones with differing PVT response, and different water salinities and hence densities, this PVT uncertainty may be the largest source of error in the measurement.

The introduction of the multiport selector valve (MSV) also facilitated the automation of the use of MPFMs, but this can also be achieved with conventional valving designs for well tests. MSVs are particularly suitable for onshore pad drilling, and where many nearby wells have similar pressures, and allow MPFMs to be shared between groups of wells. Subsea meters typically use conventional subsea valve designs, to ensure maintainability.

== Unconventional Solutions - SONAR Multiphase Measurement ==
Measurement and interpretation of 2 and 3 phase multiphase flow can also be achieved by using alternative flow measurement technologies such as SONAR. SONAR meters apply the principles of underwater acoustics to measure flow regimes and; can be clamped on to wellheads and flow lines to measure the bulk (mean) fluid velocity of the total mixture which is then post-processed and analyzed along with wellbore compositional information and process conditions to infer the flow rates of each individual phase. This approached can be used in various applications such as black oil, gas condensate and wet gas.

== Market ==
Industry experts have forecast that MPFMs will become feasible on an installation per well basis when their capital cost falls to around US$40,000 – US$60,000. The cost of MPFMs today remains in the range of US$100,000 – US$500,000 (varying with onshore/offshore, topside/subsea, the physical dimensions of the meter and the number of units ordered). Installation of these MPFMs can cost up to 25% of the hardware cost and associated operating costs are estimated at between US$20,000 and $40,000 per year.

A number of novel multiphase metering techniques, employing a variety of technologies, have been developed which eliminate the need for three-phase separator deployment. These MPFMs offer substantial economic and operating advantages over their phase separating predecessor. Nevertheless, it is still widely recognised that no single MPFM on the market can meet all multiphase metering requirements.
