= Estate of Tawney v. Columbia Natural Resources, LLC =

The Tawney Case In 2006, plaintiffs, Estate of Garrison G. Tawney, Richard L. Ashley, Janice E. Cooper, Clifford R. Cooper, Myrtle Jones, Larry G. Parker, and John W. Parker, all oil and natural gas royalty owners of West Virginia, filed suit against Columbia Natural Resources (CNR) claiming CNR had "fraudulently, intentionally, and knowingly" underpaid royalties by deducting post-production costs and by entering into futures contracts that resulted in "below-market-value sale prices." CNR routinely subtracted fees for gathering and transporting the gas to interstate pipelines, as well as, assessed volume deductions. The Plaintiffs argued the deductions were improper under the leases, which consisted of "varying language on calculation of royalties."

West Virginia Supreme Court ruled in favor of the plaintiffs, declaring CNR had wrongfully calculated the royalty payments. The verdict included $134.3 million in compensatory damages and $270 million in punitive damages; total judgment to the plaintiffs amounted in $405 million. The case was recently upheld against an appeal filed by CNR in 2007.
