= Split estate =

In the United States, a split estate is an estate where the property rights to the surface and the underground are split between two parties. It is the result of Homestead Acts such as the Alaska Native Claims Settlement Act (1971) or the Stock-Raising Homestead Act of 1916 (SRHA). The SHRA gave settlers permission to settle up to 640 acres of non-irrigable land designated by the Secretary of the Interior as "stock raising" land. Land settled under the law had the mineral rights remain with the federal government. According to the Bureau of Land Management (BLM), roughly 58 million acres of mineral rights under privately owned land are managed by the federal government through split estates. A split estate is similar to the Broad Form Deed, a type of legal document created in the United States in the early 1900s. These documents were used to sever property into mineral and surface rights, just like a split estate today.

In the 49 United States practicing British common law (the 50th, Louisiana, derived its law from French and Napoleonic Code), a split estate is created when the original fee simple owner sells or otherwise loses ownership of the subsurface, often called the mineral estate. Executor rights transfer in whole, unless otherwise reserved, and administration of the estate carries the same rights, liabilities, and privileges the surface estate does.

In the Louisiana, severability of estate is legal and common, however a particular law practice similar to easements in English law allows the reversion of the mineral estate to the current surface owner if the mineral estate is not actively engaged in productive activity. This is similar to squatter's rights in other states; however other states do not allow this for the mineral property.

Who owns the right to exploit the underground is important in case it contains minerals, oil, or natural gas. It is currently the object of controversies because some landowners are concerned about the nuisance and environmental impact. In 2026, the BLM changed policy regarding the leasing of mineral rights, lowering public comment periods from 90 days to 10 days and removing the requirement of the surface land owner's to be notified of the lease occurring on their land as a result of changes in policy from the One Big Beautiful Bill passed in 2025.

== Notes ==
The Flyover Nation: Energy's Role in a Troubled Heartland
