= Petroleum licensing =

Licenses to explore petroleum deposits

Petroleum licensing or exploration license is the act of giving licenses (geographical areas at land or sea) to a company or a joint venture allowing them to search for commercially feasible deposits for the extraction of petroleum.

Each sovereign country distributes licenses in what is typically called a licensing round. The procedure for such, can greatly vary from country to country. The largest change is usually if it is a bid system or a grant system. In the bid system, each company or joint venture will offer a bid to gain the rights for the petroleum exploration at the license for a limited period of time. The highest bid, will obtain the rights. In the grant system, the license will be granted to the company or joint venture that shows the highest interest and ability for the exploration of the license. This can be shown by the company experience, projected plan for the exploration (by high investment) and or longest presence on the country as a petroleum exploration company.

== Countries licensing rounds ==
- Malaysia - The Malaysia Petroleum Management (MPM) is pleased to announce the launch of their 2018 Exploration Bidding Round.
- United Kingdom - The Department of Energy and Climate Change (DECC - formerly the Department of Trade and Industry) grants licences. The UKCS (United Kingdom Continental Shelf) is divided into quadrants of 1 degree latitude and one degree longitude. Each quadrant is divided into 30 blocks measuring 10 minutes of latitude and 12 minutes of longitude. Some blocks are divided further into part blocks where some areas are relinquished by previous licensees. For example, block 13/24a is located in quad 13 and is the 24th block and is the 'a' part block. The UK government has traditionally issued licences via periodic (now annual) licensing rounds. Blocks are awarded on the basis of the work programme bid by the participants. The UK government has actively solicited new entrants to the UKCS via "promote" licensing rounds with less demanding terms and the fallow acreage initiative, where non-active licences have to be relinquished.
- Norway - The Norwegian Petroleum Directorate grants licences. The NCS is also divided into quads of 1 degree by 1 degree. Norwegian licence blocks are larger than British blocks, being 15 minutes of latitude by 20 minutes of longitude (12 blocks in a quad). Like in Britain, there are numerous part blocks formed by re-licensing relinquished areas. One of the attractiveness of the license blocks in Norway are the economical benefits given by its taxation policy. The Norwegian tax system refunds 78% of all directly related exploration costs, which are paid the year after the costs occurred.
- Denmark - The Danish Energy Authority administers the Danish sector. The Danes also divide their sector of the North Sea into 1 degree by 1 degree quadrants. Their blocks, however, are 10 minutes latitude by 15 minutes longitude. Part blocks exist where partial relinquishments have taken place.
- Germany - Germany and the Netherlands share a quadrant and block grid - quadrants are given letters rather than numbers. The blocks are 10 minutes latitude by 20 minutes longitude. Germany has the smallest sectors in the North Sea.
- Brazil - The National Petroleum Agency grants licenses. The license blocks are named by BT or BM, followed by the state code and a number. BT means the block is onshore, on land. While BM means the block is offshore, at sea.
- United States - Oil and gas rights in the onshore US tracts may be owned by private individuals or corporations, states, or the federal government. Rights to explore for oil on privately owned mineral rights tracts are obtained by leases negotiated between the parties. The rules for obtaining licenses to explore on state mineral rights vary from state to state. Federal onshore exploration licenses are obtained through oral competitive bidding.

Oil and gas rights in the offshore US are divided between the state and federal governments (see Offshore oil and gas in the United States). Rights to explore on US federal offshore areas are obtained through competitive sealed bids. Individual tracts are generally 9 square miles (23 km^{2}). Current leases being offered in the Gulf of Mexico have 5-year terms for tracts in water depths of less than 400 m, and 8 years for tracts in water greater than 400 m. Royalty rates are 18.75%.

== Relinquishment ==
When a petroleum license is granted, the company or joint venture is given a limited time for the exploration of the license. If after the limited time, the company has not discovered or performed its minimal obligations (usually agreed with the government as a minimum number of exploration wells and investment on seismic ) the license will be relinquished. Relinquished licenses can be re-attributed in next licensing rounds, or even kept as relinquished if the government believes there is little interest on that area for the petroleum exploration.

== See also ==
- Geology of the United Kingdom
- Geography of the United Kingdom
- Hydrocarbon exploration
