= Overriding Royalty Interest =

An Overriding Royalty Interest (ORRI) is an oil and gas interest is separated from the participatory interest of what is called the working interest. It is percentage of gross production that is not charged with any expenses of from an oil and/or gas well. An ORRI is a covenant running with the land between the assignor and assignee. However, it expires if the associated leases expire.

== Calculating ORRI ==
The overriding royalty interest, for well units, is calculated as follows:

(Overriding Royalty Rate) × (Working Interest) × (Mineral Interest) × (Tract Participation Factor) = ORRI

Where the terms are defined as follows:

- Working interest is the ownership interest that would require the participation in production expenses.
- Mineral interest is the percentage of real property interest after severance of oil and gas from surface rights.
- Tract participation factor is the number of lease acres of the lessor divided by total number of acres.
