= Oil and gas law in the United States =

Oil and gas law in the United States is the area of United States energy law concerning the property law in oil and gas under the surface, after its capture, and litigation, statutes, and regulations regarding those rights.

== Overview ==
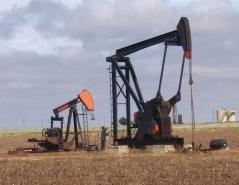
Drilling companies most often lease the rights to drill for and produce oil.

The law regulating oil and gas ownership in the US generally differs significantly from laws in Europe; oil and gas are often owned privately in the US as opposed to being owned by the national government as they are in many other countries.

=== Jurisdiction ===
In the U.S., extraction of oil and gas is generally regulated by the individual states through statutes and common law. Federal and constitutional law apply as well.

== Ownership ==
In the United States, oil and gas can be owned by individuals, corporations, LLCs, partnerships, Indian tribes, or by local, state, or federal governments.

Oil and gas rights offshore are owned by either the state or federal government and can be leased to oil companies for development. The tidelands controversy involve the limits of state ownership.

=== Prior to and at extraction ===
Because oil and gas are fluids, they may flow in the subsurface across property boundaries. In this way, an operator may permissibly extract oil and gas from beneath the land of another, if the extraction is lawfully conducted on his own property. An operator may not angle a well to penetrate beneath property not owned by or leased to him.

The two conflicting legal doctrines covering oil and gas extraction are the rule of capture, and the correlative rights doctrine. Which of the doctrines applies in a particular case depends on state law, which varies considerably from state to state, or in the case of the federal offshore zone, on U.S. federal law.

The rule of capture provides that an oil producer with a wellbore on his property is allowed to drain oil out from underneath his land—even if some of that oil originated from a neighbor's land, migrating to the oil producer's land through geologic forces or drainage. The rule of capture gives landowners an incentive to pump out oil as quickly as possible by accelerating operations or drilling multiple wells to capture the oil of their neighbors. Such practice may deplete the gas pressure needed to force oil from the ground, which will reduce the amount of oil available for recovery from that reservoir. State law often limits the rule of capture to protect correlative rights of neighboring owners. Government agencies and state oil and gas conservation commissions, such as the Texas Railroad Commission, have developed conservation laws which regulate extraction by individual owners to protect the rights of the mineral owners and to prevent economic and physical waste.

=== Split estates ===
Mineral rights may be severed by a deed from the surface rights. Such a condition is called a split estate. Once severed from surface ownership, oil and gas rights may be bought, sold, or transferred, like other real estate property. Ownership in the oil and gas rights for different horizontal layers, or strata, may be further divided and sold to different parties. In some states, severed mineral rights revert to the landowner if the mineral right not exercised for a certain time period.

In most states, unless otherwise specified by a deed, the owner of the oil and gas interest is presumed to have the right to occupy as much of the surface property as is reasonably needed to extract the oil and gas, subject to regulations for minimum distances from homes or buildings. Courts have generally held that, without this implied right of access and surface occupancy, ownership of the oil and gas rights would be meaningless. This is called subsurface supremacy.

=== Ownership of extracted oil and gas ===
Refined hydrocarbons that escape into the ground are not subject to the law of capture, unless evidence shows that the refiner abandoned them. Extracted oil and gas which are subsequently stored in underground reservoirs are considered as personal property, rather than as an interest in real estate.

== Lease ==
The foundational legal document of the U.S. oil and gas industry is the oil and gas lease. Oil and gas producing companies do not always own the land they drill on. Often, the company (the lessee) leases the mineral rights from the owner (the lessor). Major points in a lease include the description of the property, the term (duration), and the payments to the lessor.

Lessees of mineral rights have a right of reasonable access to leased land to explore, develop, and transport minerals, unless the lease specifies otherwise (a "no-surface access" lease).

=== Term of the lease ===
A lease remains in effect for a certain period of time, called the primary term, as long as the lessee pays the annual rental. The lease expires after the primary term, unless drilling or oil and gas production has started on the lease. If production is established, the lease will remain in effect past the primary term, as long as the lease continuously produces oil or gas. The lease can however, be revived by virtue of delay rentals. Delay rentals are fees paid to the lessor, to delay production or commencement of drilling, without terminating the lease. There are other clauses that also revive the lease.

To commence drilling a well under the habendum clause means that substantial preparations for such drilling has to be undertaken, as long as such measures have been commenced in good faith and with due diligence. The habendum clause sets out these terms, as well as most significantly, identifying the parties to the transaction and their interests in the conveyed real property.

An oil and gas lease generally includes a force majeure clause. Such agreement relieves the lessee from liability for breach, if the party's performance is impeded as the result of a natural cause that could not have been anticipated or prevented. This Act of God must completely prevent performance and must be unanticipated. Courts often construe this clause very strictly and rarely enforce it. For example, a tornado preventing performance in Oklahoma would not trigger the force majeure clause, since tornadoes are a common occurrence in Oklahoma.

The Responsible Federal Oil and Gas Lease Act (2008), also called the "Use It or Lose It" bill (HR 6251 IH), proposed prohibiting the Secretary of the Interior from issuing new federal oil and gas leases to holders of existing leases who do not either diligently develop the lands subject to such existing leases or relinquish such leases. This bill failed to pass in the House of Representatives.

=== Pugh clauses ===
Unless specified otherwise, establishing commercial production from a single well within the lease will hold the entire lease as long as production continues. Language to the contrary is called a Pugh clause. The Pugh Clause is named after a Louisiana lawyer, Lawrence G. Pugh, who first used this kind of language in an oil and gas lease in 1947. In Texas, the clause is sometimes referred to as a "Freestone Riders" clause.

A Pugh Clause is meant to prevent a lessee from declaring all lands under an oil and gas lease as being held by production, even if production only occurs on a fraction of the property. A Pugh clause may specify that a producing well may hold only a specified area around that well; after the primary term, the mineral owner is free to lease the rest of the land to others. Pugh clause can be either "vertical", "horizontal", or both. A vertical Pugh clause limits the lease to certain depths or certain geological formations. A horizontal Pugh clause severs a leasehold on the basis of horizontal planes, while a vertical Pugh clause severs based on vertical planes only.

=== Payments ===
Payments to the lessor typically take three forms: bonus, rental, and royalties, as negotiated between the parties.

- The bonus is an up-front payment made at the time the lease takes effect.
- The rental is an annual payment, usually made until such time as the property begins producing oil or gas in commercial quantities.

The royalty is a portion of the gross value of any oil or gas produced from the lease that is paid to the mineral owner. It is not a portion of profits, for it is paid without deducting costs of drilling, completing, or operating the well. Whether or not the operator can deduct costs of treating, transporting, or marketing the oil and gas, if not specified in the lease, has been a matter of legal dispute. The traditional royalty rate for oil and gas in the United States was one-eighth (12.5 percent), although today it is often higher. Some states, such as Pennsylvania and West Virginia, have set the legal minimum royalty for private oil and gas leases to one-eighth.

In an "unless-delay rental" lease, a lessee agrees to pay delay rentals so long as the lessee is not drilling on the property. An "unless" oil and gas lease terminates automatically, if the lessee fails to drill within the specified time or pay the delay rentals as called for in the lease.

== Contract ==
Oil and gas contracts have nuances which differ from standard contracts. For example, when an assignment of an oil and gas lease expressly provides that any extension or renewal of the lease is subject to an overriding royalty, a new lease that is substantially similar to the first lease and procured by the assignee during the term of the first lease, is regarded, as a matter of law, as an extension of renewal of the first lease.

Statutes can override agreements made by parties. For instance, a statute may void an agreement to indemnify a construction worker as to liability for death or bodily injury incurred on an oil well, regardless of the indemnitee's negligence, without affecting the validity of an insurance contract. It affirms the right of an individual party to obtain insurance, not to protect the interests of the indemnitee. These suits for negligence are typically brought by drilling site workers known as roustabouts.

The two most common contractual agreements entered into by oil and gas companies are the Farmout Agreement and the Joint Operating Agreement. A farmout agreement, generally, is between one company that owns a lease, and another company that wishes to drill the property. The company wishing to drill, called the farmee, provides drilling services in exchange for a majority interest in the lease owned by the farmor.

=== Case law ===
- Estate of Tawney v. Columbia Natural Resources, LLC (2006), West Virginia

=== Joint operations ===
In some cases, oil and gas rights or leases in a drilling unit are held by more than one company or person who wish to participate in drilling and production. In such cases, the various interests sign a Joint Operating Agreement, a contract entered into by two or more ownership or leasehold co-tenants to jointly explore and develop the oil and gas property, including operations, voting mechanisms, subsequent operations, risk-sharing, indemnities and exculpatory provisions, revenue allocation, title examination and title issues, and future acquisitions and divestitures in the contract area. One company is designated as the operator, and operates the property on a day-to-day basis.

There are various terms describing ownership interests in an oil or gas well. An interest signifying a duty to pay expenses is called:

- Working Interest: the share of well drilling or operating expenses paid. The owner of a working interest will also own a corresponding, but usually lower, net revenue interest.

Interests in receiving income include:

- Net Revenue Interest: the share of income received, connected to a working interest
- Royalty Interest: the share of income received, unrelated to a working interest, and therefore received without paying any well expenses; usually connected to a leased mineral ownership. When a mineral owner signs a lease, he receives a royalty interest.
- Overriding Royalty Interest: An overriding royalty interest is a share of income received, unconnected to either mineral ownership or working interest. A person or company may receive an overriding royalty by a contract with an owner of a net revenue interest. This is typically received for performing some service for working interest owners. The original owner of an oil and gas lease will sometimes retain an overriding royalty as part of a farmout agreement.

For any oil and gas property, the total working interests must add up to 100%. The sum of the net revenue interests, royalty interests, and overriding royalty interests, must also add up to 100%.

== In education and practice ==
Law school classes teaching oil and gas law generally require that students first take a class in property and contract law. In Texas and Wyoming, oil and gas law is tested on the bar exam.

Oil and gas law practitioners usually fall into three broad categories. First, oil and gas companies usually have in-house attorneys that advise the company of its rights and the legal issues. These attorneys are usually assisted by landmen, who examine property titles, land oil and gas rights, and acquire property for the company. Landmen may be lawyers themselves. Second, practitioners may represent private parties. When an oil company attempts to obtain land from a private party, a party may retain counsel to be better informed of his or her rights and to negotiate a favorable bargain with the oil company. Last, oil and gas attorneys work for federal and state governments that oversee energy and environmental policy and land acquisitions.

There are several not-for-profit foundations that exist to further the practical and scholarly study of oil and gas law, for example the Energy and Mineral Law Foundation and the Rocky Mountain Mineral Law Foundation.

== Regulation ==
Regulation of oil and gas drilling and production are largely left to the states, except for federal offshore waters, where operations are regulated by the Bureau of Ocean Energy Management. The names and organizational structures of the state agencies overseeing oil and gas extraction vary. In Texas, oil and gas are regulated by the Texas Railroad Commission, in Oklahoma by the Oklahoma Corporation Commission, and in North Dakota by the Industrial Commission. In Colorado and Wyoming, the agencies are the state Oil and Gas Conservation Commissions.

Local control of oil and gas operations is contentious. The key legal issue is generally whether, or to what extent, state regulations preempt local controls. The result varies state-to-state. In 2023, a recent law in California banning new drilling in certain places including homes, schools, and healthcare facilities gathered enough signatures to put a referendum, filed on behalf of a board member of the California Independent Petroleum Association, on the 2024 general election ballot. There is controversy over how some of the signatures were collected.

States require a drilling permit before a well begins drilling. Requirements to receive drilling permits generally include minimum setbacks from lease or unit boundaries, and adequate casing and cementing programs.

States generally require permits for or notices of major work done on a well, and periodic reports of oil and gas produced.

When a well reaches the end of economic production, it must be plugged according to the terms of a plugging permit.

Where the onshore oil and gas rights are owned by the federal government, as is the case for much land in the western United States, the various permits must also be obtained from the Bureau of Land Management as well as the state, which may have different requirements than the equivalent state permits.

== See also ==
- United States energy law
- Renewable energy in the United States
- New York energy law
