= Mineral rights =

Property rights to exploit an area for the minerals

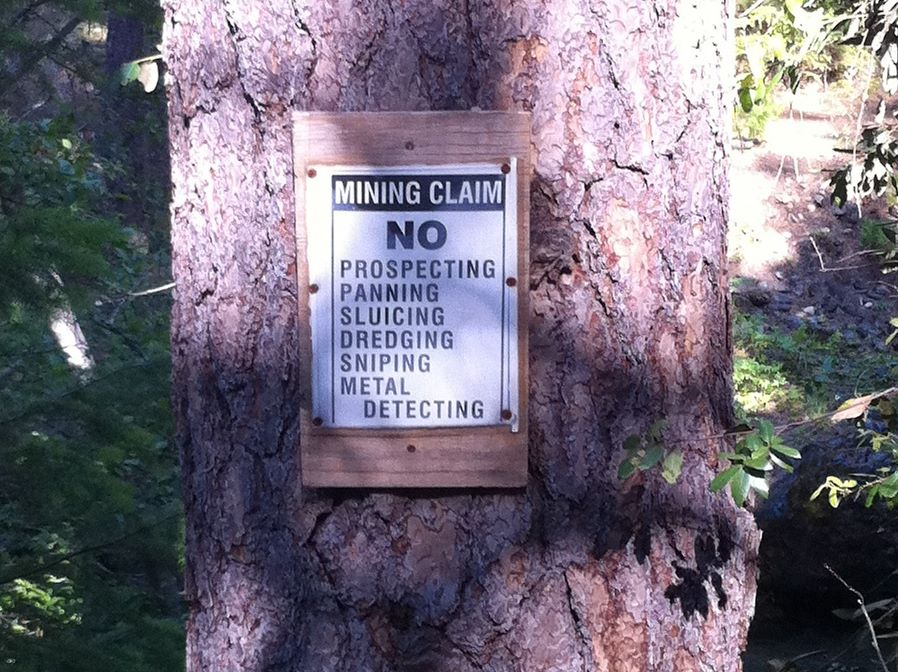
Mining claim, South Yuba River

Mineral rights (often referred to as a "mineral interest" or a "mineral estate") are property rights to exploit an area for the minerals it harbors. Mineral rights can be separate from property ownership (as in a split estate). Mineral rights can refer to sedentary minerals that do not move below the Earth's surface or fluid minerals such as oil or natural gas. There are three major types of mineral property: unified estate, severed or split estate, and fractional ownership of minerals.

== Mineral estate ==
Owning mineral rights gives the owner the right to exploit, mine, or produce any or all minerals they own. Minerals can refer to oil, gas, coal, metal ores, stones, sands, or salts. An owner of mineral rights may sell, lease, or donate those minerals to any person or company as they see fit. Mineral interests can be owned by private landowners, private companies, or federal, state or local governments. Sorting these rights are a large part of mineral exploration. A brief outline of rights and responsibilities of parties involved can be found here.

=== Types of mineral estate ===
==== Unified estate ====
Unified estates, sometimes referred to as "fee simple" or "unified tenure" mean that the surface and mineral rights are not severed.

==== Severed/split estate ====
This type of estate occurs when mineral and surface ownership are separated. This can occur from prior ownership of mineral rights or is commonly performed when land is passed between family generations. Today corporations own a significant portion of mineral rights beneath private individuals.

Mineral estates can be severed, or separated, from surface estates. There are two main avenues to mineral rights severance: the surface property may be sold and the minerals retained, or the minerals may be sold and the surface property retained, though the former is more common. When mineral rights have been severed from the surface rights (or property rights), it is referred to as a "split estate." In a split estate, the owner of the mineral rights has the right to develop those minerals, regardless of who owns the surface rights. This is because in United States law, mineral rights trump surface rights. The U.S. historical precedent for this severance roots from western expansion and The Land Ordinance Act of 1785 and The Northwest Ordinance Act of 1789 at the cost of dispossessed Natives. Severability was further reinforced by the Homestead Act of 1862 (OHA) and the 1862 Railroad Act. Agricultural patents and the California gold rush of 1848 began placing lands that were mineral abundant into private hands and furthered the precedent of mineral rights outweighing surface rights. This was a crucial step in the development of an economic system based largely on private incentives and market transactions. An early case involving a property dispute between a father and son involving ownership of coal veins in Pennsylvania is cited stating; “One who has the exclusive right to mine coal upon a tract of land has the right of possession even as against the owner of the soil, so far as it is necessary to carry on mining operations.” (Turner v. Reynolds, 1854). A later case in Texas in 1862 set precedent by stating “it is a well-established doctrine from the earliest days of the common law, that the right to the minerals thus reserved carries with it the right to enter, dig and carry them away." (Cowan v. Hardeman, 1862). Some may argue that the U.S. justice system's enabling of this precedent is further exacerbated by industry lobbying that enables the status quo of favoring oil and gas development vs other innovations.

This severability can create tension between mineral rights owners and surface rights owners if the surface rights owners do not want to allow the mineral rights owners to use their property to access their minerals. This is becoming ever more present in the light of recent unconventional oil and gas development (UOGD) made feasible by technological advancement such as hydraulic fracturing. Problems include water pollution, fluid storage issues and surface damages. These are especially common in the West Virginia gas wells of the Marcellus Shale. Often, companies will offer a surface rights owner a surface use agreement, which can provide financial compensation to the surface owner, or more commonly, offer some concessions on how the minerals are accessed. For example, some surface use agreements require the company to access the property from specific roads or points on the property.

A major issue involving fluid mineral rights is the "rule of capture" whereby minerals capable of migrating beneath the Earth's surface can be extracted, even if the original source was another person's mineral property. Such claims typically are protected by various states' oil and gas regulatory agencies whose broader mandate is to promote conservation and minimize conflicts between mineral owners.

==== Fractional ownership ====
Here a percentage of the mineral property is owned by two or more entities. This can occur when owners leave fractions of the rights to multiple children or grandchildren.

== Major elements ==
The five elements of a mineral right are:

1. The right to use as much of the surface as is reasonably necessary to access the minerals
2. The right to further convey rights
3. The right to receive bonus consideration
4. The right to receive delay rentals
5. The right to receive royalties

The owner of a mineral interest may separately convey any or all of the above-listed interests. Minerals may be possessed as a life estate, which does not permit a person to sell them, but merely that they own the minerals so long as they live. After this, the rights revert to a predesignated entity, such as a specific organization or person.

It is possible for a mineral right owner to sever and sell an oil and gas royalty interest, while keeping the other mineral rights. In such case, if the oil lease expires, the royalty interest is extinguished, its purchaser has nothing, and the mineral owner still owns the minerals.

== Mining claims ==
A mining claim is the claim of the right to extract minerals from a tract of public land. In the United States, the practice began with the California gold rush of 1849. In the absence of organized government, the miners in each new mining camp made up their own rules, and to a large extent adopted Mexican mining law. The Mexican law gave the right to mine to the first one to discover the mineral deposit and begin mining it. The area that could be claimed by one person was limited to that which could be mined by a single individual or a small group.

The US system of mining claims is an application of the legal theory of prior appropriation, by which public property is granted to the first one to put it to beneficial use. Other applications of appropriation theory were the Homestead Act, which granted public land to farmers, and water rights in the west.

The California miners spread the concept of mining claims to other mining districts all over the western United States. The US Congress legalized the practice in 1866, and amended it in the Mining Act of 1872. All land in the public domain, that is, federal land whose use has not been restricted by the government to some specific purpose, was subject to being claimed. The mining law has been changed numerous times, but still retains some features similar to those settled on by the California 49ers.

The concept was also used in other countries, for example during the Australian gold rushes which occurred at a similar time starting from the 1850s, and included similar groups of people including miners that migrated from the American gold rushes. The Oriental Claims in Victoria are one example of this.

A placer claim is a mining claim on gravel or ground from which minerals (a placer deposit) are extracted using water.

=== Staking a claim ===
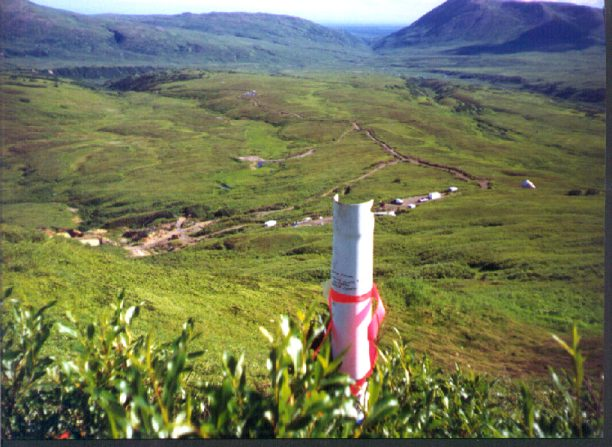
Corner post of the claim of the Blue Ribbon Mine in Alaska

In the United States, staking a claim involves first the discovery of a valuable mineral in quantities that a "prudent man" (the Prudent Man Rule) would invest time and expenses to recover. Next, marking the claim boundaries, typically with wooden posts or capped steel posts, which must be four feet tall, or stone cairns, which must be three feet tall. Finally, filing a claim with both the land management agency (USFS or BLM), and the local county registrar.

There are four main types of mining claims:

1. Placer (minerals free of the local bedrock, and deposited in benches or streams)
2. Lode (minerals in place in the mother rock),
3. Tunnel (a location for a proposed tunnel which claims all veins discovered during the driving of it)
4. Millsite (a maximum five-acre site for processing ore)

A mining claim always starts out as an unpatented claim. The owner of an unpatented claim must continue mining or exploration activities on an unpatented claim, or he may pay a fee to the land management agency by September 1 of each year, or it is considered abandoned and becomes null. Activities on unpatented claims must be restricted to those necessary to mining. A patented claim is one for which the federal government has issued a patent (deed). To obtain a patent, the owner of a mining claim must prove to the federal government that the claim contains locatable minerals that can be extracted at a profit. A patented claim can be used for any purpose desired by the owner, just like any other real estate. However, Congress has ceased funding for the patenting process, so at this time a claim cannot be patented.

=== Claim jumping ===
A dispute when one party (a "claim jumper") attempts to seize the land on which another party has already made claim is known as "claim jumping".

== Leasing ==
An owner of mineral rights may choose to lease those mineral rights to a company for development at any point. Signing a lease signals that both parties agree to the terms laid out in the lease. Lease terms typically include a price to be paid to the mineral rights owner for the minerals to be extracted, and a set of circumstances under which those minerals are to be extracted. For instance, a mineral rights owner might request that the company minimize any noise and light pollution when extracting the minerals. Leases are usually term-limited, meaning the company has a limited amount of time to develop the resources; if they do not begin development within that time-frame they forfeit their right to extract those minerals.

The four components of mineral rights leasing are:

1. Ownership
2. Leasing
3. The division order
4. The royalty check

=== Ownership ===
There are three distinct but related aspects of ownership. They are:

- Legal description
- Net mineral acres
- Ownership type

=== Leasing ===
To bring oil and gas reserves to market, minerals are conveyed for a specified time to oil companies through a legally binding contract known as a lease. This arrangement between individual mineral owners and oil companies began prior to 1900 and still thrives today. Before exploration can begin, the mineral owner (lessor) and the oil company (lessee) must agree to certain terms regarding the rights, privileges and obligations of the respective parties during the exploration and possible production stages.

Although there are numerous other important details, the basic structure of the lease is straightforward: in exchange for an up-front lease bonus payment, plus a royalty percentage of the value of any production, the mineral owner grants the oil company the right to drill for a period of time, known as the primary term. If the term of the oil or gas lease extends beyond the primary term, and a well was not drilled, then the Lessee is required to pay the lessor a delay rental. This delay rental could be $1 or more per acre. In some cases, no drilling occurs and the lease simply expires.

The duration of the lease may be extended when drilling or production starts. This enters into the period of time known as the secondary term, which applies for as long as oil and gas is produced in paying quantities.

=== Division order ===
A division order is not a contract. It is a stipulation, derived from the lease agreement and other agreements, as to what the operator of a well or an oil or gas purchaser will disburse in terms of revenue to the mineral owner and others. The purpose of the division order is to show how the mineral revenues are divided up between the oil company, the owners of the mineral rights (royalty owners) and the overriding royalty interest owners.

The division order needs a signature, a current address and social security number for individual royalty owners or tax identification number for companies.

=== Oil and gas lease ===
An oil and gas lease is a contract because it contains consideration, consent, legal tangible items and competency.

- The term of the lease. Usually there is a primary term and a secondary term. Each term has conditions set up either by the lessor or lessee to fulfill.
- The royalty rate. This is how the rates are divided and how it is calculated from the revenues produced from the mineral rights.
- If the lessor receives a bonus
- If there is a delay rental agreement—any delay in production by the lessee for a negotiated period, the lessee can pay the lessor a negotiated amount of money per year to keep the contract active
- If there is a "shut-in royalty" agreement—royalties are paid at a negotiated rate per acre, only while the well is not producing oil or gas

Many other line items can be negotiated by the time the contract is complete. The rights of all parties are defined in agreements; and, when mineral production begins, the division order states how much revenue goes to each party involved.

=== Royalty check ===
Mineral owners may receive a monthly royalty check if oil, gas, or any other substances of value are extracted from below the surface and either sold or used by an oil and gas operating company. Royalty statements include the production and revenue figures for both the individual owner and the entire well. The royalty paid is a function of the net value of the proceeds from the sale of the oil, gas, or other substance, multiplied by the owner's revenue interest decimal, less any amounts deducted for taxes or other deductions.

The revenue decimal used to calculate the amount of an owner's royalty check is calculated with the following equation:

- A = Net mineral acres owned
- U = Number of mineral acres in the oil and gas drilling unit or pool
- R = The royalty assigned to the mineral rights owner by the oil and gas lease covering the minerals
- P = Participation factor assigned to the tracts owned by the mineral owner as described in a unit agreement
- Y = Additional ownership factor assigned to the owner's mineral rights by any other arrangement or agreement
- D = Deductions

Revenue interest decimal $= (A \div U) \times R \times (P \times Y - D)$

It is common for royalty checks to fluctuate between pay periods due to monthly changes in oil or gas prices, or changes in the volumes produced by the associated oil or gas wells. Additionally, royalties may cease altogether if the associated wells quit producing marketable quantities of oil or gas, if the operating company has changed hands and the new operator has not yet established a new payment account for the owner, or if the operating company or product purchaser is missing appropriate paperwork or proper documentation of changes in ownership or contact information.

== Surface use agreement ==
A surface use agreement (SUA) is a contract between a property owner and a mineral rights holder that dictates how the mineral rights are to be developed. Meaning, when mineral rights are extracted by a company that does not own the property above where the minerals are located, the company has the legal right to extract those minerals regardless. However, companies will often enter into voluntary negotiations with the surface rights owner to ensure that the operations all go smoothly. In such cases, the company will offer a SUA, in which property owners may ask for financial compensation or other concessions regarding how the minerals are extracted. See sample.

== See also ==
- Air rights
- Bergregal - mining rights in Europe
- Environmental impact assessment
- Easement
- General Mining Act of 1872
- Land rights
- Mining law
- Oil and gas law in the United States
- Split estate
- Stock-Raising Homestead Act of 1916
- Water rights
