= U.S. territorial sovereignty =

Territory under US jurisdiction

United States territory is the area under the sovereign jurisdiction of the federal government of the United States, including all of its land and territorial waters near the mainland and islands. The United States asserts sovereign rights for exploring, exploiting, conserving, and managing a 200-nautical-mile (370 km; 230 mi) exclusive economic zone in neighboring ocean waters.

== Land ==
The land area of the United States includes the 50 states, the District of Columbia, and inhabited and uninhabited insular areas known as territories. The states have subsidiary sovereignty and concurrent jurisdiction with the federal government. Under the United States Constitution, the federal government has exclusive sovereignty and Congress has full lawmaking power over the District of Columbia (per the Enumerated powers) and territories (per the Territorial Clause). Congress has granted each inhabited jurisdiction some degree of home rule. Uninhabited insular areas are administered by the Office of Insular Affairs, except for Palmyra Atoll, which is administered by the Fish and Wildlife Service. Inhabited territories are administered by local governments, with federal policy coordination and oversight by the Office of Insular Affairs, except for Puerto Rico. There is no federal agency with general oversight for Washington, DC or Puerto Rico, but there is program-by-program oversight and general points of contact such as the White House Office of Intergovernmental Affairs. The territories and district all have non-voting members of the United States House of Representatives.

=== Definitions of "United States" ===
A Supreme Court ruling from 1945 stated that the term "United States" can have three different meanings, in different contexts:

The term "United States" may be used in any one of several senses. It may be merely the name of a sovereign occupying the position analogous to that of other sovereigns in the family of nations. It may designate the territory over which the sovereignty of the United States extends, or it may be the collective name of the states which are united by and under the Constitution.

— Hooven & Allison Co. v. Evatt, 324 U.S. 652 (1945)

From 1901 to 1905, the U.S. Supreme Court in a series of opinions known as the Insular Cases established the doctrine of territorial incorporation. It said the Constitution applied fully in incorporated territories such as Alaska and Hawaii, but only applied partially in the then-new unincorporated territories of Puerto Rico, Guam and the Philippines.

=== Insular areas ===
Locations of the insular areas of the United States, color-coded to indicate status The 50 states and the District of Columbia Incorporated, unorganized territory Unincorporated territory with Commonwealth status Unincorporated, organized territory Unincorporated, unorganized territory

The United States currently claims 16 insular areas as territories:

- American Samoa
- Guam
- Northern Mariana Islands
- Puerto Rico
- United States Virgin Islands
- Minor Outlying Islands
  - Bajo Nuevo Bank
  - Baker Island
  - Howland Island
  - Jarvis Island
  - Johnston Atoll
  - Kingman Reef
  - Midway Islands
  - Navassa Island
  - Palmyra Atoll
  - Serranilla Bank
  - Wake Island

The italicized islands are part of a territory dispute with Colombia and are not included in the ISO designation of the USMOI. The United States does not administer these two territories.

Palmyra Atoll is the only incorporated territory remaining, and having no government it is also unorganized. The remaining are unincorporated territories of the United States. Puerto Rico and the Northern Mariana Islands are styled as commonwealths.

=== Federal domestic exclaves and federally owned lands ===
Federal jurisdiction includes federal enclaves like national parks and domestic military bases, even though these are located in the territory of a state. Host states exercise concurrent jurisdiction to some degree. The federal government also exercises property rights in addition to sovereignty, over land not owned by a state, tribe, local government, or private entity.

The Land Ordinance of 1785 and the Northwest Ordinance of 1787 provided for the survey and settlement of the lands that the original Thirteen Colonies ceded to the federal government after the American Revolution. As additional lands were acquired by the United States from Spain, France and other countries, the United States Congress directed that they be explored, surveyed, and made available for settlement. During the Revolutionary War, military bounty land was promised to soldiers who fought for the colonies. After the war, the Treaty of Paris of 1783, signed by the United States, the UK, France, and Spain, ceded territory to the United States. In the 1780s, other states relinquished their own claims to land in modern-day Ohio. By this time, the United States needed revenue to function. Land was sold so that the government would have money to survive. In order to sell the land, surveys needed to be conducted. The Land Ordinance of 1785 instructed a geographer to oversee this work as undertaken by a group of surveyors. The first years of surveying were completed by trial and error; once the territory of Ohio had been surveyed, a modern public land survey system had been developed. In 1812, Congress established the United States General Land Office as part of the Department of the Treasury to oversee the disposition of these federal lands. By the early 1800s, promised bounty land claims were finally fulfilled.

In the 19th century, other bounty land and homestead laws were enacted to dispose of federal land. Several different types of patents existed. These include cash entry, credit, homestead, Indian, military warrants, mineral certificates, private land claims, railroads, state selections, swamps, town sites, and town lots. A system of local land offices spread throughout the territories, patenting land that was surveyed via the corresponding Office of the Surveyor General of a particular territory. This pattern gradually spread across the entire United States. The laws that spurred this system with the exception of the General Mining Law of 1872 and the Desert Land Act of 1877 have since been repealed or superseded.

In the early 20th century, Congress took additional steps toward recognizing the value of the assets on public lands and directed the Executive Branch to manage activities on the remaining public lands. The Mineral Leasing Act of 1920 allowed leasing, exploration, and production of selected commodities, such as coal, oil, gas, and sodium to take place on public lands. The Taylor Grazing Act of 1934 established the United States Grazing Service to manage the public rangelands by establishment of advisory boards that set grazing fees. The Oregon and California Revested Lands Sustained Yield Management Act of 1937, commonly referred as the O&C Act, required sustained yield management of the timberlands in western Oregon.

Currently, federal lands are about 640 million acres, about 28% of the total U.S. land area of 2.27 billion acres. Federal lands are administered by a variety of departments, agencies, and quasi-governmental corporations.

== Maritime territory ==
The federal government of the United States has claims to the oceans in accord with the United Nations Convention on the Law of the Sea, which delineates a zone of territory adjacent to territorial lands and seas. United States protects this marine environment, though not interfering with other lawful uses of this zone. The United States' jurisdiction has been established on vessels, ships, and artificial islands (along with other marine structures).

In 1983 President Ronald Reagan, through Proclamation No. 5030, claimed a 200-mile exclusive economic zone. In December 1988, President Reagan, through Proclamation No. 5928, extended U.S. territorial waters from three nautical miles to twelve nautical miles for national security purposes. However a legal opinion from the Justice Department questioned the President's constitutional authority to extend sovereignty as Congress has the power to make laws concerning the territory belonging to the United States under the U.S. Constitution. In any event, Congress needs to make laws defining if the extended waters, including oil and mineral rights, are under state or federal control.

The primary enforcer of maritime law is the U.S. Coast Guard. Federal and state governments share economic and regulatory jurisdiction over the waters owned by the country. (See tidelands.)

The exclusive economic zones of the United States

== Disputed territory ==
The United States has international territorial disputes with:

- Canada (see List of areas disputed by Canada and the United States)
  - Machias Seal Island (Maine and New Brunswick)
  - Strait of Juan de Fuca (Washington state and British Columbia)
  - Yukon–Alaska dispute, Beaufort Sea
  - Dixon Entrance (Alaska and British Columbia)
  - Northwest Passage, which the United States considers international
- Dominican Republic - EEZ boundary with Puerto Rico
- Haiti - Navassa Island
- Colombia and Honduras
  - Bajo Nuevo Bank
  - Serranilla Bank
- Tokelau - Swains Island
- Marshall Islands - Wake Island

== History ==
State cessions of land claims from 1780 to 1802 gave the federal government exclusive control of a large unorganized (no local government) area between the Appalachian Mountains and the Mississippi River, to the international boundary set by the 1783 Treaty of Paris. The 1789 Northwest Ordinance passed by the Congress of the Confederation (before the current constitution was adopted) created the first organized federal territory, the Northwest Territory.

Over time, more organized territories were created, each with a local legislature and a territorial governor and officers, appointed by the President and approved by the Senate of the United States. Unorganized territory was generally either unpopulated or set aside for Native Americans and other indigenous peoples in the United States by the U.S. federal government, until such time as the growing and restless population encroached into the areas.

As a result of several Supreme Court cases after the Spanish–American War, the United States had to determine how to deal with its newly acquired territories, such as the Philippines, Puerto Rico, Guam, Wake Island, and other areas that were not part of the North American continent and which were not necessarily intended to become a part of the Union of States. As a consequence of the Supreme Court decisions, the United States has since made a distinction between incorporated and unincorporated territories. In essence, an incorporated territory is land that has been irrevocably incorporated within the sovereignty of the United States and to which the full corpus of the U.S. Constitution applies. An unincorporated territory is land held by the United States, and to which Congress of the United States applies selected parts of the constitution. At the present time, the only incorporated U.S. territory is the unorganized (and unpopulated) Palmyra Atoll.

State land claims and cessions to the federal government (1782–1802)

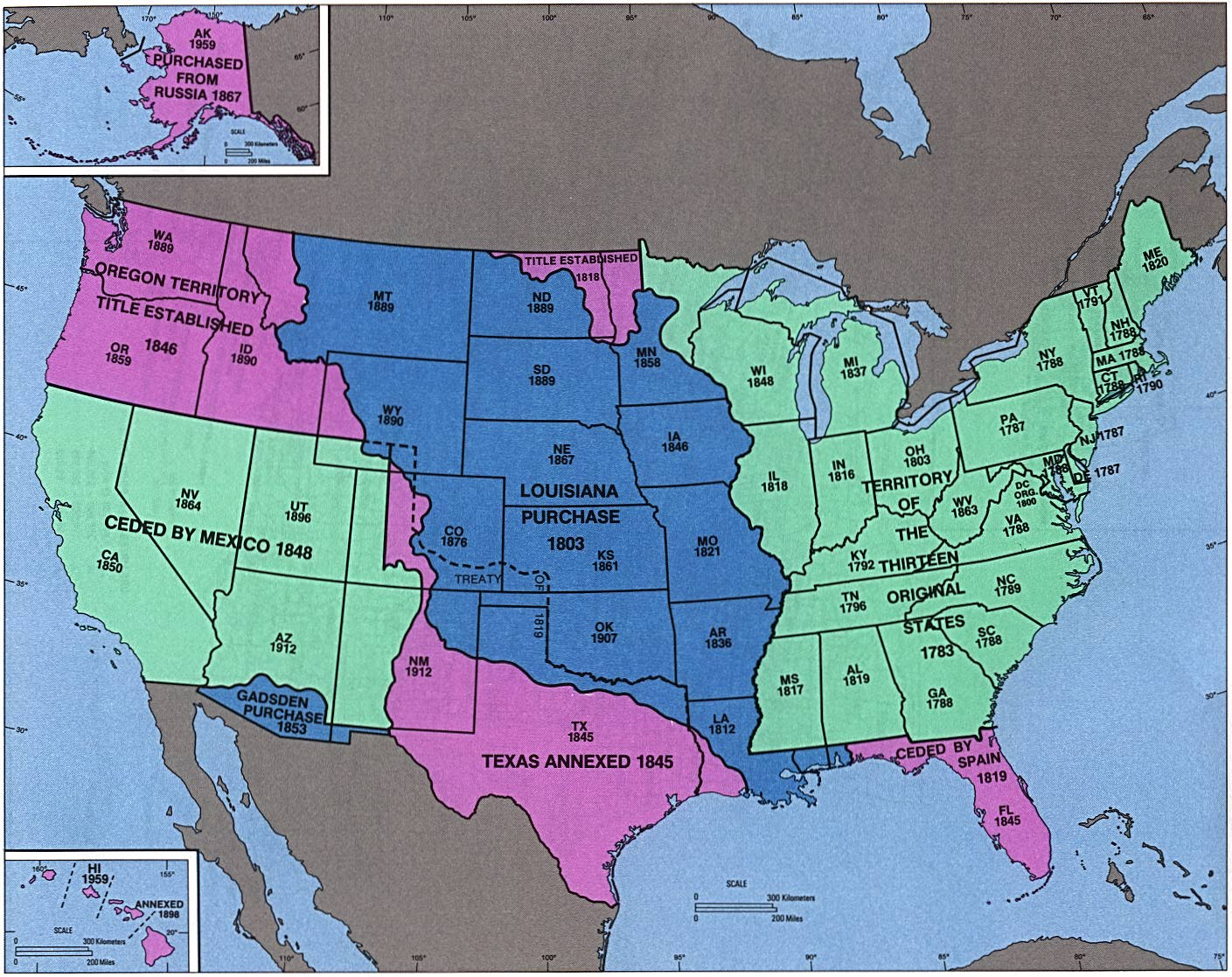
Admission of states and territorial acquisition, U.S. Bureau of the Census

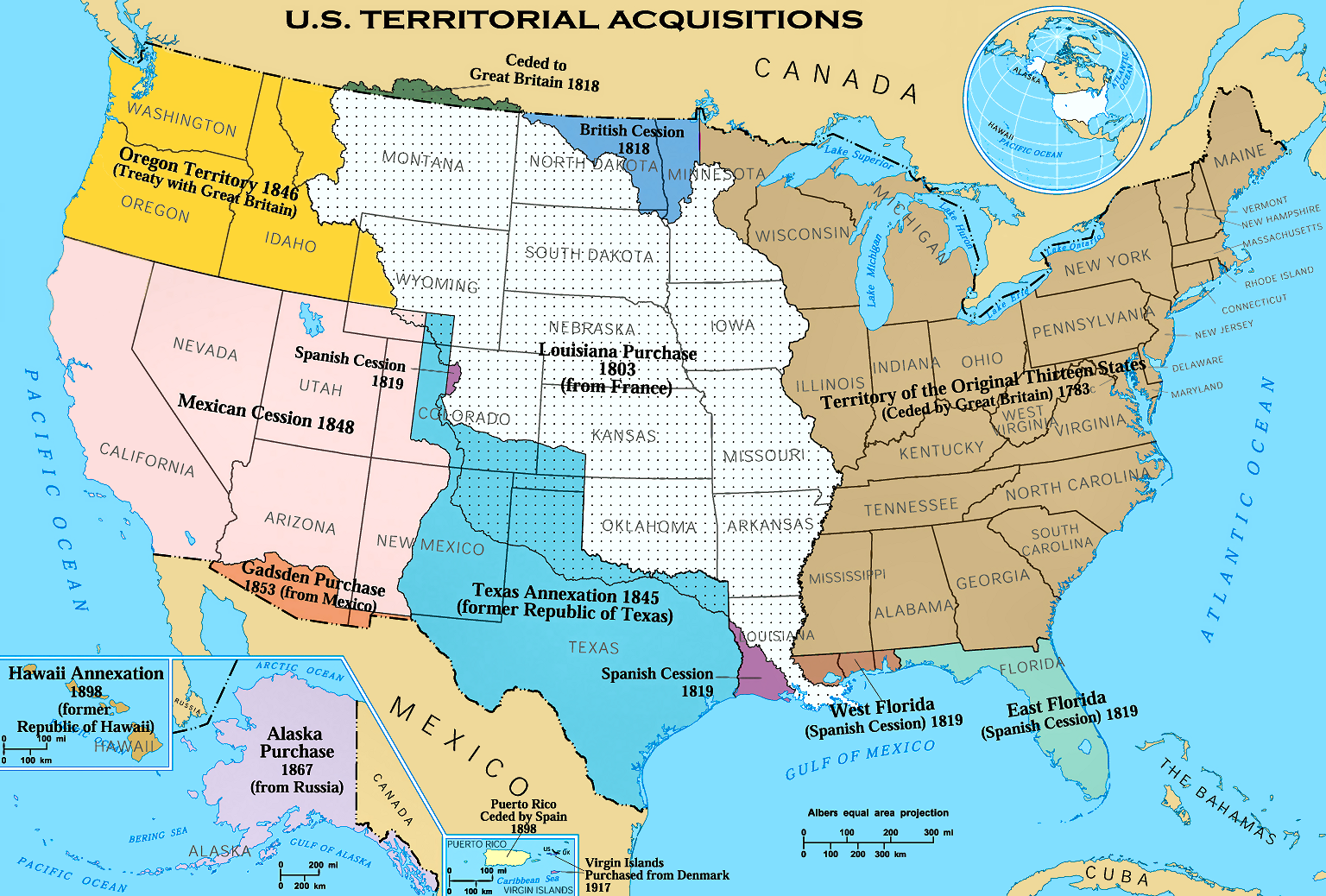
Territorial acquisitions of the United States

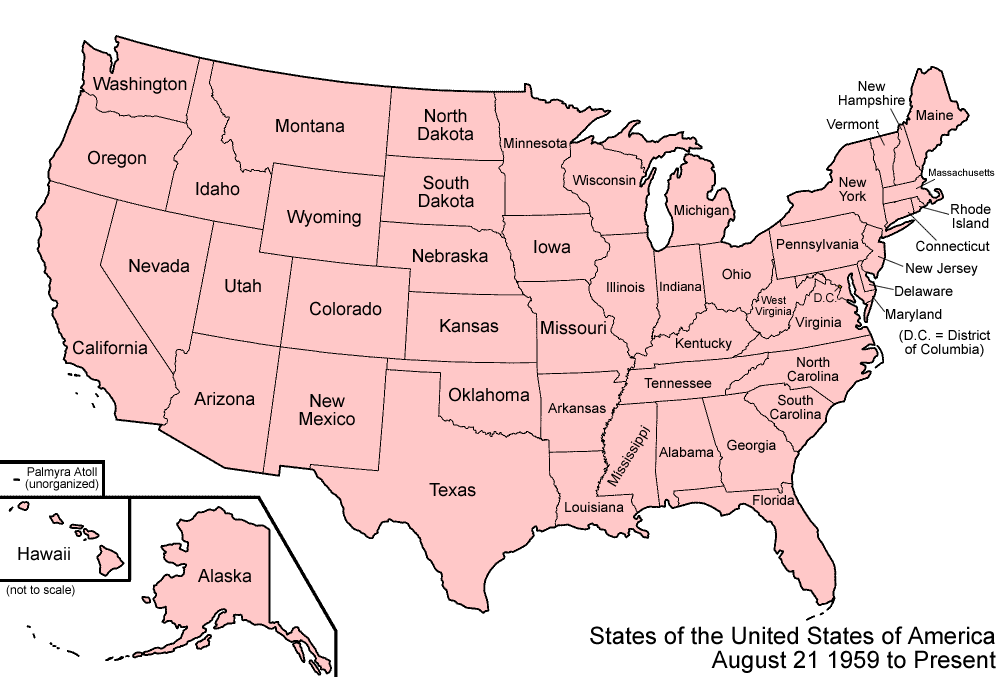
States and incorporated territories of the United States, August 21, 1959, to present

From July 8, 1947, until October 1, 1994, the United States administered the Trust Territory of the Pacific Islands, but the Trust ceased to exist when the last member state of Palau gained its independence to become the Republic of Palau. The Panama Canal, and the Canal Zone surrounding it, was territory administered by the United States until 1999, when control was relinquished to Panama.

== Occupied territory ==
The United States has occupied a number of countries in the Americas throughout its history, a number of European countries and Pacific islands related to World War I and World War II, and Iraq in the 2000s. The United States Constitution has not been applied to these jurisdictions, insofar as the Bill of Rights is not enforced by US courts, and these areas have had no voting rights in the federal government.

== Customs territories ==
The fifty states, the District of Columbia, and Puerto Rico form the main customs territory of the United States. Special rules apply to foreign trade zones in these areas. Separate customs territories are formed by American Samoa, Guam, Northern Mariana Islands, the U.S. Minor Outlying Islands, and the U.S. Virgin Islands.

== Extraterritorial jurisdiction ==
The United States exercises extraterritoriality on military installations, American embassies and consulates located in foreign countries, and research centers and field camps in Antarctica. Despite exercise of extraterritorial jurisdiction, these overseas locations remain under the sovereignty of the host countries (except Antarctica, where there is no host country). Because they are not part of any state, extraterritorial jurisdiction is federal, with Congress's plenary power under Article IV, Section 3, Clause 2 of the U.S. Constitution.

The United States has made no territorial claim in Antarctica but has reserved the right to do so. American research stations in Antarctica—Amundsen–Scott South Pole Station, McMurdo Station, and Palmer Station—are under U.S. jurisdiction but are held without sovereignty per the Antarctic Treaty.

The Guantanamo Bay Naval Base, Guantanamo Bay, notionally under the sovereignty of Cuba, is administered by the United States under a perpetual lease, much as the Panama Canal Zone used to be before the signing of the Torrijos–Carter Treaties. Only mutual agreement or U.S. abandonment of the area can terminate the lease. The legitimacy of this arrangement is disputed by the government of Cuba.

The federal government also exercises property ownership, but not sovereignty over land in various foreign countries. Examples include the John F. Kennedy Memorial built at Runnymede in England, and 32 acres (13 hectares) around Pointe du Hoc in Normandy, France.

== Airspace ==
U.S. sovereignty includes the airspace over its land and territorial waters. No international agreement exists on the vertical limit that separates this from outer space, which is international.

== Freely Associated States ==
The three Freely Associated States of Federated States of Micronesia, Republic of the Marshall Islands, and the Republic of Palau are not under U.S. sovereignty, but each participates in federal programs under a Compact of Free Association.

== Notes ==
- Fleury Graff, Thibaut (2013). Etat et territoire en droit international. L'exemple de la construction du territoire des Etats-Unis (1789–1914) (State and Territory in International Law. The case of United States' Territory (1789–1914)). Paris, France: Pedone. ISBN 978-2-233-00686-8.
- Lalor, John J. (1899). "Territories". Cyclopaedia of Political Science, Political Economy, and of the Political History of the United States. New York: Maynard, Merrill, and Co. OCLC 221087006.
- McFerson, Hazel M. (1997). The Racial Dimension of American Overseas Colonial Policy. Westport, Conn.: Greenwood Press. ISBN 0-313-28996-4. OCLC 36301430.
- Willoughby, Westel W. (1910). The Constitutional Law of the United States. Vol. 2. New York: Baker, Voorhis & Company. OCLC 180533376.
