= Carey Act =

1877 American congressional act

- Long title: An Act to provide for the disposition of public desert land and to assist in the reclamation of arid lands by irrigation.
- Enacted by: the 53rd United States Congress

Citations
- Statutes at Large: 28 Stat. 422

Codification
- Titles amended: 43 U.S.C. § 641 et seq.

Legislative history
- Introduced in the Senate as S. 1591 by Sen. Joseph M. Carey (R–WY) on February 12, 1894; Committee consideration by Senate Public Lands Committee; Passed the Senate on July 18, 1894 (Passed by unanimous consent); Passed the House on August 2, 1894 (by amendment to House appropriation bill) (Agreed by voice consent); Signed into law by President Grover Cleveland on August 18, 1894

The Carey Act of 1877 (also known as the Federal Desert Land Act) allowed private persons and companies to be granted desert lands, erect irrigation systems, and profit from the sales of water in western semi-arid states.

The Carey Act was enacted into law by Congress by the Act of August 18, 1894 (28 Stat. 422), as amended (43 U.S.C. § 641 et seq.). It was a new approach for the disposal of public desert land, as the federal government decided this task was too large for individual settlers. Through advertising, these companies attracted farmers to the many states which successfully utilized the act, notably Idaho and Wyoming.

Senator Joseph Maull Carey of Wyoming introduced the bill in 1892 but it was not passed by Congress until 1894 when it was attached as a compromise measure to the 1894 Civil Appropriations Bill. The Act established the United States General Land Office, which was controlled by the federal government. This land office assigned as many as 1 million acres (4,000 km^{2}) of land for each western state. Each state then had to regulate the new land, selecting private contractors, selecting settlers, and the maximum price they could charge for water. Potential settlers who met specific requirements were granted 160 acres (0.65 km^{2}) each. Projects were financed by the development companies, who eventually handed over control to an operating company.

In most states, settlers had to pay an entry fee, plus a small amount for the land, and meet several guidelines. In Iowa, for example, settlers had to cultivate and irrigate at least one sixteenth of their parcel within one year from the date which water became available. After another year, one eighth had to be cultivated, and by the third year — had the settler lived in the land, and paid all necessary fees — they would receive the deed to that parcel.

In general, the act was not as successful as intended, because few western states had the financial resources to make it effective. However, both Idaho and Wyoming achieved some successes. In 1908, Idaho received an additional 2 million acres (8,100 km^{2}) and Wyoming received an additional 1 million acres (4,000 km^{2}) of land to develop under the Carey Act. Today, approximately 60% of the Carey Act lands irrigated in the United States are in Idaho. Examples of successful Carey Act projects include Boise, Minidoka and Twin Falls. Wyoming was home to some of the first projects under the Carey Act, including the Cody Canal financed by a group of investors led by William F. Cody and supported by then state engineer Elwood Mead. Many of Wyoming's irrigation projects also began following World War II. Wyoming senator Francis E. Warren was also responsible for bringing the Carey Act to effect.

== See also ==
- Newlands Reclamation Act of 1902
- Timber and Stone Act
- Homestead Act
- Public domain (land)
