= Lowering Gasoline Prices to Fuel an America That Works Act of 2014 =

- Long title: To lower gasoline prices for the American family by increasing domestic onshore and offshore energy exploration and production, to streamline and improve onshore and offshore energy permitting and administration, and for other purposes.
- Announced in: the 113th United States Congress
- Sponsored by: Rep. Doc Hastings (R-WA)

Legislative history
- Introduced in the House as H.R. 4899 by Rep. Doc Hastings (R-WA) on June 19, 2014; Committee consideration by United States House Committee on Natural Resources, United States House Committee on the Judiciary; Passed the House on June 26, 2014 (Roll Call Vote 368: 229-185)

The Lowering Gasoline Prices to Fuel an America That Works Act of 2014 (H.R. 4899) is a bill that would revise existing laws and policies regarding the development of oil and gas resources on the Outer Continental Shelf. The bill is intended to increase domestic energy production and lower gas prices.

The bill was introduced and passed in the United States House of Representatives during the 113th United States Congress.

== Background ==
The administration of President Barack Obama delayed the sale of some oil and natural gas sales off the coasts of Virginia and South Carolina. This bill would require those sales to go forward.

Louisiana and other states along the Gulf of Mexico will receive 37.5 percent of the off-shore royalty payments paid to the federal government for off-shore leases in that area beginning in 2017. The maximum royalty payout is currently $500 million, but would be increased to $1 billion in 2024 by this bill.

== Provisions of the bill ==
This summary is based largely on the summary provided by the Congressional Research Service, a public domain source.

Lowering Gasoline Prices to Fuel an America That Works Act of 2014 - Amends the Outer Continental Shelf Lands Act (OCSLA) to direct the United States Secretary of the Interior to implement a leasing program that includes at least 50% of the available unleased acreage within each outer Continental Shelf (OCS) planning area considered to have the largest undiscovered, technically recoverable oil and gas resources, with an emphasis on offering the most geologically prospective parts of the planning area.

Directs the Secretary to: (1) submit to Congress a new proposed oil and gas leasing program for the 5-year period from July 15, 2015, to July 15, 2021; and (2) approve a final oil and gas leasing program by July 15, 2016.

Prohibits construction of this Act as authorizing the issuance of a lease under the Outer Continental Shelf Lands Act to any person designated for the imposition of sanctions pursuant to specified law.

Directs the Secretary to conduct offshore oil and gas Lease Sale 220 on the OCS offshore Virginia within one year after the date of enactment of this Act.

Directs the Secretary to conduct a lease sale within two years after enactment of this Act for certain areas off the coast of South Carolina. Directs the Secretary to offer for sale by December 31, 2015, leases of tracts in the Santa Maria and Santa Barbara/Ventura Basins of the Southern California OCS Planning Area.

Retains the authority of the United States Secretary of Defense (DOD) with the approval of the President of the United States, to designate national defense areas on the OCS.

Establishes in the United States Department of the Interior: (1) an Under Secretary for Energy, Lands, and Minerals; (2) an Assistant Secretary of Ocean Energy and Safety; (3) an Assistant Secretary of Land and Minerals Management; (4) a Bureau of Ocean Energy; (5) an Ocean Energy Safety Service; and (6) an Office of Natural Resources Revenue.

Abolishes the Minerals Management Service.

Directs the Secretary to establish an Outer Continental Shelf Energy Safety Advisory Board.

Establishes in the Treasury the Ocean Energy Enforcement Fund as depository for non-refundable fees collected from the operators of facilities subject to inspection.

Prohibits the Bureau of Ocean Energy and the Ocean Energy Safety Service from developing, proposing, finalizing, administering, or implementing any limitation on activities under their jurisdictions as a result of the coastal and marine spatial planning component of the National Ocean Policy developed under Executive Order 13547.

Redefines the OCS to include all submerged lands lying within the U.S. exclusive economic zone and the Continental Shelf adjacent to any U.S. territory.

Directs the Secretary to promulgate rules regarding the revenue streams contemplated by the Gulf of Mexico Energy Security Act of 2006, including the timing and methods of disbursements of certain funds under such Act. Increases, for FY2024-FY2055, the maximum amount of qualified OCS revenues distributed to Gulf producing states.

Prescribes requirements for judicial review of any action or decision by a federal official regarding the issuance of an energy lease under this Act.

Federal Lands Jobs and Energy Security Act - Directs the Secretary, when practicable, to encourage the use of U.S. workers and equipment manufactured in the U.S. in all construction related to mineral resource development under this Act.

Streamlining Permitting of American Energy Act of 2014 - Amends the Mineral Leasing Act (MLA) to direct the Secretary to decide whether to issue a permit to drill within 30 days after receiving a permit application, with specified allowable deadline extensions.

Deems a permit application approved if the Secretary has not made a decision by 60 days after its receipt. Prescribes requirements for denial and resubmission of an application.

Requires the Secretary to collect a single $6,500 permit processing fee per application at the time the decision is made whether to issue a permit.

Directs the Secretary to collect a $5,000 documentation fee to accompany each protest for a lease, right of way, or application for permit to drill.

Requires the Secretary to: (1) establish a Federal Permit Streamlining Project in every Bureau of Land Management (BLM) field office with responsibility for permitting energy projects on federal land, and (2) enter into a related memorandum of understanding (MOU) with the United States Secretary of Agriculture, the Administrator of the Environmental Protection Agency (EPA), and the Chief of the Army Corps of Engineers.

Requires the Secretary to provide matching funding of 50% for joint projects with states to conduct oil and gas resource assessments on federal lands with significant oil and gas potential.

Providing Leasing Certainty for American Energy Act of 2014 - Directs the Secretary, in conducting lease sales under the MLA, to offer for sale at least 25% of the annual nominated acreage not previously made available for lease. Shields such acreage from protest and the test of extraordinary circumstances.

Amends the MLA to prohibit the Secretary from: (1) withdrawing any covered energy project without finding a violation of lease terms by the lessee; (2) delaying indefinitely issuance of project approvals, drilling and seismic permits, and rights of way for activities under a lease; or (3) cancelling or withdrawing any lease parcel after a competitive lease sale has occurred and a winning bidder has made the last payment for the parcel.

Requires federal land managers to follow existing resource management plans and continue to lease actively in areas designated as open when resource management plans are being amended or revised, until such time as a new record of decision is signed.

Declares without force or effect BLM Instruction Memorandum 2010-117 (which establishes a process to ensure orderly, effective, timely, and environmentally responsible leasing of oil and gas resources on federal lands).

Protecting Investment in Oil Shale the Next Generation of Environmental, Energy, and Resource Security Act or the PIONEERS Act - Deems the final regulations regarding oil shale management published by the BLM on November 18, 2008, to satisfy all legal and procedural requirements under any law, including the Federal Land Policy and Management Act of 1976, the Endangered Species Act of 1973, and NEPA. Directs the Secretary to implement those regulations, including the oil shale leasing program they authorize, without any other administrative action necessary.

Directs the Secretary to hold a lease sale, within 180 days after enactment of this Act, that offers an additional ten parcels for lease for research, development, and demonstration of oil shale resources under the terms offered in the solicitation of bids published on January 15, 2009.

Requires the Secretary, by January 1, 2016, to hold at least five separate commercial lease sales, in multiple lease blocs, in areas of at least 25,000 acres, which: (1) have been nominated through public comment, and (2) are considered to have the most potential for oil shale development.

Planning for American Energy Act of 2014 - Amends the MLA to direct the Secretary, in consultation with the Secretary of Agriculture (USDA) with regard to lands administered by the Forest Service, to publish every four years a Quadrennial Federal Onshore Energy Production Strategy to direct federal land energy development and department resource allocation in order to promote the energy and national security of the United States in accordance with the Bureau of Land Management (BLM) mission to promote the multiple use of federal lands.

Requires the Secretary to determine a domestic strategic production objective for the development of energy resources from such lands.

Expresses the sense of Congress that federally recognized Indian tribes may elect to set their own production objectives as part of the Strategy.

Grants the relevant Secretary all necessary authority to make determinations regarding which additional federal lands available for leasing at the time the lease sale occurs will be available to meet the production objectives established by the strategies.

National Petroleum Reserve Alaska Access Act - Amends the Naval Petroleum Reserves Production Act of 1976 to require the mandatory program of competitive leasing of oil and gas in the National Petroleum Reserve (NPR) in Alaska to include at least one lease sale annually in those areas most likely to produce commercial quantities of oil and natural gas each year in the period 2014-2024.

Directs the Secretary to ensure permits according to a specified time line for all surface development activities, including pipelines and roads construction, to: (1) develop and bring into production areas within the NPR that are subject to oil and gas leases, and (2) transport oil and gas from and through the NPR to existing transportation or processing infrastructure on the North Slope of Alaska.

Requires the Secretary to ensure that any federal permitting agency shall issue construction permits for transportation of oil and natural gas under existing federal oil and gas leases with drilling permits within 60 days after enactment of this Act. Requires approval of drilling permits under new federal oil and gas leases within six months after submission of a permit request to the Secretary.

Directs the Secretary to issue: (1) a new proposed integrated activity plan from among the non-adopted alternatives in the NPR Alaska Integrated Activity Plan Record of Decision dated February 21, 2013, and (2) an environmental impact statement under NEPA for issuance of oil and gas leases in the NPR-Alaska to promote efficient and maximum development of oil and natural gas resources of such reserve.

Nullifies the February 21, 2013, Record of Decision, including its integrated activity plan and environmental impact statement.

Prescribes requirements for the new proposed integrated activity plan.

Requires the Secretary to assess all technically recoverable fossil fuel resources within the NPR, including all conventional and unconventional oil and natural gas.

Directs the U.S. Geological Survey (USGS), in cooperation with the state of Alaska and the American Association of Petroleum Geologists, to implement and complete the resource assessment within 24 months after enactment of this Act.

BLM Live Internet Auctions Act - Amends the MLA to authorize the Secretary to conduct onshore oil and gas lease sales through Internet-based live bidding methods.

Requires each individual Internet-based lease sale to conclude within seven days.

Directs the Secretary to analyze the first ten such lease sales and evaluate the effectiveness of different structures for lease sales.

== Congressional Budget Office report ==
This summary is based largely on the summary provided by the Congressional Budget Office, a public domain source.

Title I would revise existing laws and policies regarding the development of oil and gas resources on the Outer Continental Shelf. Title I is similar to H.R. 2231, the Offshore Energy and Jobs Act, which was passed by the House of Representatives on June 28, 2013. Differences in the estimates primarily reflect a later assumed enactment date.

Title II would make certain amendments to the Mineral Leasing Act, require the United States Secretary of the Interior to conduct new activities related to oil and gas development on federal lands, and authorize the Secretary to conduct auctions for federal onshore oil and gas leases using Internet-based bidding methods. Title II contains provisions that are similar to those in H.R. 1965, the Federal Lands Jobs and Energy Security Act, which was passed by the House of Representatives on November 20, 2013, H.R. 1394; the Planning for American Energy Act of 2013, as ordered reported by the House Committee on Natural Resources on July 24, 2013; H.R. 1964, the National Petroleum Reserve Alaska Access Act, as ordered reported by the House Committee on Natural Resources on June 12, 2013; and H.R. 555, the BLM Live Internet Auctions Act, as ordered reported by the House Committee on Natural Resources on July 24, 2013. Differences in the estimates primarily reflect a later assumed enactment date.

== Procedural history ==
The Lowering Gasoline Prices to Fuel an America That Works Act of 2014 was introduced into the United States House of Representatives on June 19, 2014 by Rep. Doc Hastings (R-WA). It was referred to the United States House Committee on Natural Resources and the United States House Committee on the Judiciary. The House voted in Roll Call Vote 368 on June 26, 2014 to pass the bill 229-185.

== Debate and discussion ==
Rep. Hastings, who introduced the bill, argued that "the current turmoil in Iraq has already caused the price of gasoline to increase, and it serves as an important reminder of why we need to increase production here at home" because it is the "best way to protect ourselves from price spikes caused by international conflicts." Hastings blamed President Obama for the high gas prices, saying that "since President Obama took office, gasoline prices have doubled and our federal energy resources have been put under tight lock-and-key." Hastings also argued that the bill would "create over 1 million new American jobs."

Rep. Bill Cassidy (R-LA) supported the bill, arguing that the bill "would allow us to take advantage of our natural resources and expands our energy manufacturing and construction industries."

Rep. Peter DeFazio (D-OR) opposed the bill, arguing that it did not solve the true cause of high gas prices which he blamed on "Big Oil in the United States and speculation on Wall Street." DeFazio called the bill the "drill everywhere" bill.

== See also ==
- List of bills in the 113th United States Congress
- Offshore drilling on the US Atlantic coast
