= Federal lands =

Land owned by the U.S. federal government

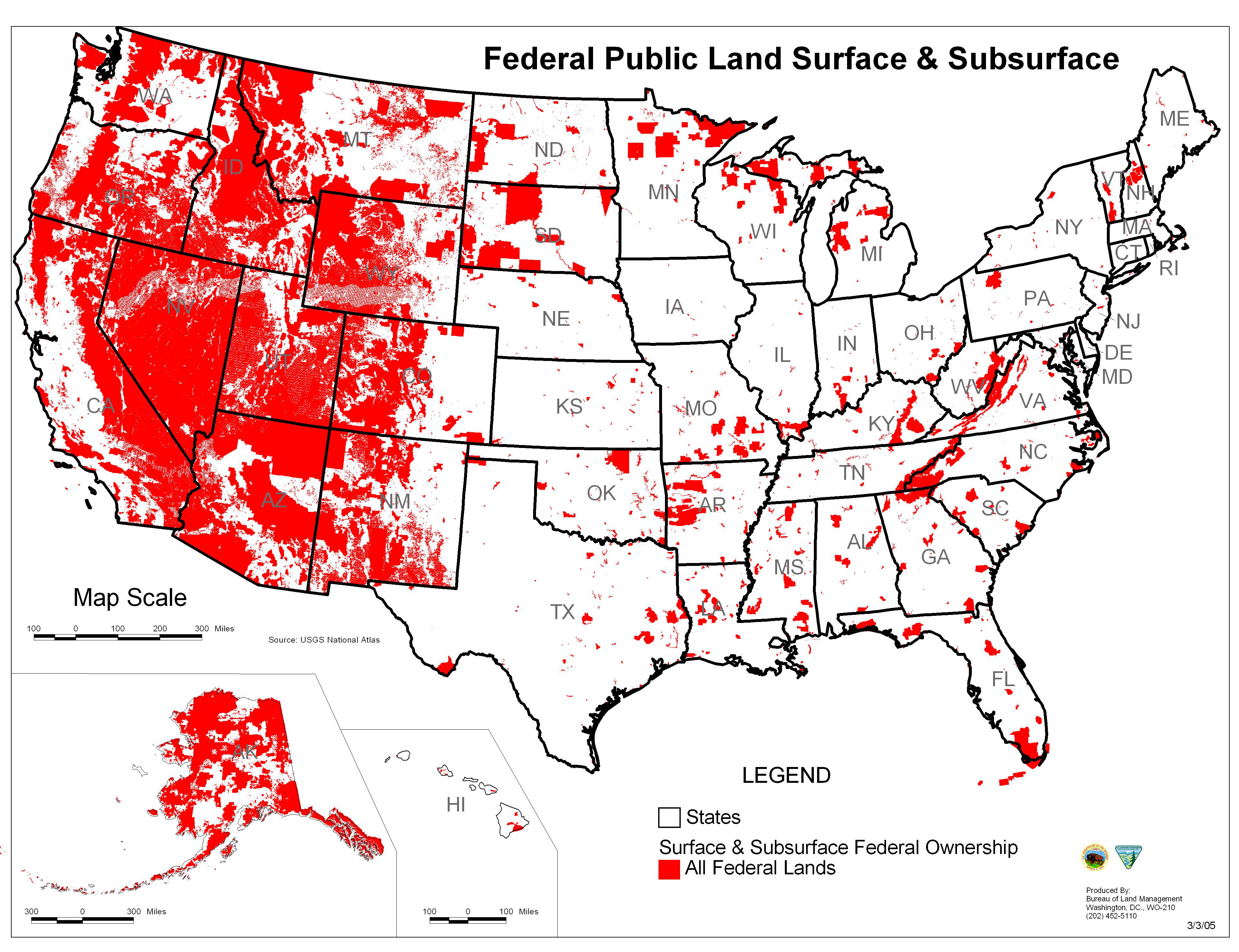
Federally managed lands in the 50 states, including subsurface rights. This map includes federal lands held in trust for Native Americans, which may not be considered federal lands in other contexts.

Federal lands via managing government bureau Bureau of Indian Affairs Bureau of Land Management Bureau of Reclamation Department of Defense (includes Army Corps of Engineers projects) Fish and Wildlife Service Forest Service National Park Service Tennessee Valley Authority Other agencies

In the United States, federal lands are lands owned and managed by the United States federal government. Pursuant to the Property Clause of the United States Constitution (Article 4, section 3, clause 2), Congress has the power to retain, buy, sell, and regulate federal lands. These powers have been recognized in a long series of United States Supreme Court decisions.

In Article I, Section 8, Clause 17 the United States Constitution empowers Congress with exclusive legislative authority like that exercised for Washington, D.C., over "Places purchased by the Consent of the Legislature of the State in which the same shall be, for the erection of Forts, Magazines, Arsenals, Dock-yards, and other needful Buildings." However, as long as state law does "not impair the federal governments effective use of the land", states still have jurisdiction over federal lands acquired without the consent of a state legislature as the Property Clause (Article IV, Section 3, Clause 2) of the Constitution does not require the consent of a state legislature for the federal government to possess lands within the state in question.

The federal government manages about 640 million acres (2.6 million km^{2}) of land in the United States, which is about 28% of the total land area of 2.27 billion acres (9.2 million km^{2}). The majority of federal lands (610.1 million acres (2.469 million km^{2}) or 95 percent area in 2015) are administered by the Bureau of Land Management (BLM), United States Fish and Wildlife Service (FWS), National Park Service (NPS), or United States Forest Service (USFS). BLM, FWS, and NPS are part of the United States Department of the Interior, while the Forest Service is part of the United States Department of Agriculture. An additional 11.4 million acres (46 thousand km^{2}) of land (about 2% of all federal land) is managed by the United States Department of Defense (DOD). The majority of federal lands are located in Alaska and the Western states.

== Legal background ==
The United States Supreme Court has upheld the broad powers of the federal government to deal with federal lands, for example having unanimously held in Kleppe v. New Mexico that "the complete power that Congress has over federal lands under this clause necessarily includes the power to regulate and protect wildlife living there, state law notwithstanding."

Lands held by the United States in trust for Native American tribes are generally not considered public lands. There are some 55 million acres (0.22 million km^{2}) of land held in trust by the federal government for Indian tribes and almost 11 million acres (45 thousand km^{2}) of land held in trust by the federal government for individual Natives. Although the United States holds legal title to these lands, the tribe or individual holds beneficial title (the right to use and benefit from the property). As a result, Indian Country is "quasi-private, not public, land." Nevertheless, "because the United States is a legal title holder, the federal government is a necessary part in all leases and dispositions of resources including trust land. For example, the secretary of the interior must approve any contract for payment or grant by an Indian tribe for services for the tribe 'relative to their lands' (25 U.S.C. § 81)."

== History of federal lands ==
The Land Ordinance of 1785 and the Northwest Ordinance of 1787 provided for the survey and settlement of the lands that the original Thirteen Colonies ceded to the federal government after the American Revolution. As additional lands were acquired by the United States from Spain, France, Native American Nations and other countries, the United States Congress directed that they be explored, surveyed, and made available for settlement. During the Revolutionary War, military bounty land was promised to soldiers who fought for the colonies. After the war, the Treaty of Paris of 1783, signed by the United States, the Kingdom of Great Britain, France, and Spain, ceded territory to the United States. In the 1780s, other states relinquished their own claims to land in modern-day Ohio. By this time, the United States needed revenue to function. Land was sold so that the government would have money to operate. In order to sell the land, surveys needed to be conducted. The Land Ordinance of 1785 instructed a geographer to oversee this work as undertaken by a group of surveyors. The first years of surveying were completed by trial and error; once the territory of Ohio had been surveyed, a modern public land survey system had been developed. In 1812, Congress established the United States General Land Office as part of the Department of the Treasury to oversee the disposition of these federal lands. By the early 1800s, promised bounty land claims were finally fulfilled.

In the 19th century, other bounty land and homestead laws were enacted to dispose of federal land. These included, among others, the Homestead Act of 1862 and the Desert Lands Entry Act of 1877. Several different types of patents existed. These include cash entry, credit, homestead, Indian, military warrants, mineral certificates, private land claims, railroads, state selections, swamps, town sites, and town lots. A system of local land offices spread throughout the territories, patenting land that was surveyed via the corresponding Office of the Surveyor General of a particular territory. This pattern gradually spread across the entire United States. Homestead entries peaked in 1910, when they amounted to 18.3 million acres (0.074 million km^{2}), and sharply declined after 1935 and were eliminated in 1986. The laws that spurred mass federal land transfers, with the exception of the General Mining Law of 1872 and the Desert Land Act of 1877, have since been repealed or superseded.

Between 1781 and 2018, the federal government divested itself of estimated 1.29 billion acres (5.2 million km^{2}) of public domain land. The vast majority (97%) of transfers of federal land to private ownership occurred before 1940. Beginning in the early 20th century, U.S. government policy shifted from disposing of public land to retaining and managing it. Congress took additional steps toward recognizing the value of the assets on public lands and directed the Executive Branch to manage activities on the remaining public lands. The Mineral Leasing Act of 1920 allowed leasing, exploration, and production of selected commodities, such as coal, oil, gas, and sodium to take place on public lands. The Taylor Grazing Act of 1934 established the United States Grazing Service to manage the public rangelands by establishment of advisory boards that set grazing fees. The Oregon and California Revested Lands Sustained Yield Management Act of 1937, commonly referred as the O&C Act, required sustained yield management of the timberlands in western Oregon.

The Sagebrush Rebellion movement in the Western United States in the 1970s and the 1980s sought major changes to federal land control, use, and disposal policy in 13 western states in which federal land holdings include between 20% and 85% of a state's area. Supporters of the movement wanted more state and local control over the lands, if not outright transfer of them to state and local authorities and/or privatization.

From 1990 to 2018, the overall acreage held by the federal government decreased by 4.9% (i.e., from 646.9 million acres (2.618 million km^{2}) to 615.3 million acres (2.490 million km^{2})). Over that time period, the federal acreage held by the Bureau of Land Management and Department of Defense decreased by 10.2% and 56.8%, respectively, and the federal acreage held by the Forest Service, Fish and Wildlife Service, and National Park Service increased by 0.8%, 2.7%, and 5.0%, respectively. Over the 1990–2018 time period, the largest decline in federal acreage was in Alaska (a decrease of 9.4%, or 23.0 million acres (0.093 million km^{2})) and in the 11 contiguous states of the West (a 3% decrease in federal land, or 10.7 million acres (0.043 million km^{2})).

== Primary federal land holders ==
The four primary federal land holders are:

- Department of the Interior
  - Bureau of Land Management (BLM) - The agency was formed in 1946 from the consolidation of the Grazing Service and the General Land Office. BLM manages about 244.4 million acres (0.989 million km^{2}) of federal lands as of 2018, more than any other agency. Of these, more than 99% are in the 11 Western states or Alaska. BLM primarily emphasizes rangeland, but also administers lands for purposes other than grazing, including recreation; timber, energy, and mineral extraction; and conservation (including watershed and wildlife/fish habitat).
  - United States Fish and Wildlife Service (FWS) - Manages about 89.2 million acres (0.361 million km^{2}) of federal land (as of 2018), of which 85.9% are in Alaska. FWS-administered land is primarily for conservation and promotion of wildlife; however, some other uses (such as resource extraction) are permitted under certain conditions and in certain areas.
  - National Park Service (NPS) - Manages about 79.9 million acres (0.323 million km^{2}) of federal land (as of 2018), of which 66% are in Alaska. There are 434 official NPS units with a variety of titles, including national park, national monument, national historic site, national recreation area, and national battlefield.
- Department of Agriculture
  - United States Forest Service (USFS) - Manages about 192.9 million acres (0.781 million km^{2}) of national forests (as of 2018). Although Forest Service holdings are mostly in the West, the USFS also manages about 60% of all federal lands in the Eastern United States.

The fifth largest federal landowner is the United States Department of Defense, which owns, leases, or possessed 26.1 million acres (0.106 million km^{2}) worldwide, of which 8.8 million acres (0.036 million km^{2}) are located in the United States (this figure excluded United States Army Corps of Engineers land). DoD thus administers approximately 1% of federal land. DOD land is mostly military bases and reservations. The largest single DOD-owned, all-land tract is the 2.3-million-acre White Sands Missile Range in New Mexico.

Together, the BLM, FWS, NPS, Forest Service, and DOD manage about 96% of federal land. The remaining 4% of federal land is controlled by other federal agencies, including the United States Army Corps of Engineers, the Bureau of Reclamation, the United States Postal Service, the National Aeronautics and Space Administration, and the U.S. Department of Energy.

== Distribution ==
Federal land is concentrated in the Western United States. Nationwide, the federal government owns 27.4% of all land area. There are significant variations regionally; the federal government owns 61.3% of the land area in Alaska, 46.4% of the land area in the 11 contiguous Western states; and 4.2% of the land area of other states. The state with the highest percentage of land held by the federal government is Nevada (80.1%); the states with the lowest percentage of land held by the federal government are Connecticut and Iowa (0.3%).

== Primary laws regarding federal lands ==
- Alaska National Interest Lands Conservation Act
- Alaska Native Claims Settlement Act
- Endangered Species Act (16 U.S.C. § 1531 et seq.)
- Federal Land Policy and Management Act of 1976 (FLPMA)
- Federal Land Transaction Facilitation Act (Baca Act) (Pub. L. 106–248 (text) (PDF))
- Mineral Leasing Act
- National Environmental Policy Act (NEPA)
- Omnibus Public Land Management Act (Pub. L. 111–11 (text) (PDF))
- Taylor Grazing Act (43 U.S.C. § 315 et seq.)
- Wild and Free-Roaming Horses and Burros Act of 1971

== Acquired lands ==
In the United States, acquired lands refer to a category of public lands under federal management that were obtained by the federal government through purchase, condemnation, gift, or exchange.

== Uses ==
In the United States, federal lands are often used for environmental conservation. In 2023 alone, the executive turned 12.5 million acres into protected areas.

== See also ==
- Federal enclave
- Public lands in the United States
