= Public lands in the United States =

Map of all federally owned land in the United States.

Most of the public land managed by the US Forest Service and Bureau of Land Management is in the Western states. Public lands account for 25 to 75 percent of the total land area in these states.

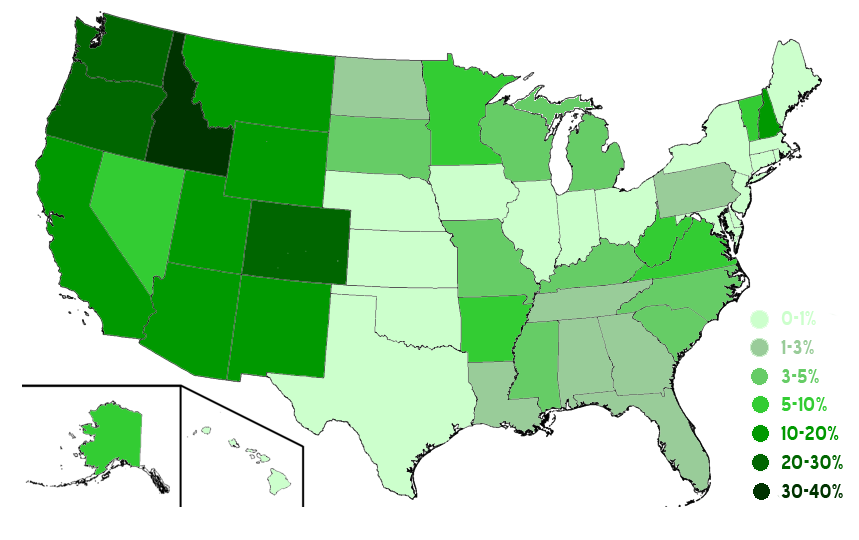
The US Forest Service alone manages 193 million acres (780,000 km²) nationwide, or roughly 8% of the total land area in the United States.

In the United States, governmental entities at all levels – including townships, cities, counties, states, and the federal government – all manage land which are referred to as either public lands or the public domain.

The federal government owns 640 million acres, about 28% of the 2.27 billion acres of land in the United States. About 95 per cent of these acres are managed by five agencies: Bureau of Land Management (BLM), the United States National Park Service, the Bureau of Reclamation, or the Fish and Wildlife Service and the United States Forest Service. Other federal agencies that have important roles are the National Oceanic and Atmospheric Administration and the United States Department of Defense, which includes the U.S. Army Corps of Engineers.

In general, Congress must legislate the creation or acquisition of new public lands, such as national parks; however, under the 1906 Antiquities Act, also known as the National Monuments Act, the president may designate new national monuments without congressional authorization if the monument is on federally-owned land.

Each western state also received federal "public land" as trust lands designated for specific beneficiaries, which the States are to manage as a condition to acceptance into the union. Those trust lands cannot any longer be considered public lands as allowing any benefits to the "public" would be in breach of loyalty to the specific beneficiaries. The trust lands (two sections, or about 1,280 acres (5.2 km^{2}) per township) are usually managed extractively (grazing or mining), to provide revenue for public schools. All states have some lands under state management, such as state parks, state wildlife management areas, and state forests.

Typically each parcel is governed by its own set of laws and rules that explain the purpose for which the land was acquired, and how the land may be used.

== History ==
The concept of a formal designation and conservation of public lands dates back to the first National Parks. While designating the parks as public, the conservation was another matter. Theodore Roosevelt and his conservation group, Boone and Crockett Club created laws and regulations that protected public land. Roosevelt and the Boone and Crockett Club continued on influencing the creation of large amounts of public lands including the National Refuge System, USFS and the United States National Forest system.

== Recreation ==
Most state- and federally managed public lands are open for recreational use. Recreation opportunities depend on the managing agency, and run the gamut from the less restrictive, undeveloped wide open spaces of BLM lands to the highly developed and controlled national and state parks. Wildlife refuges and state wildlife management areas, managed primarily to improve habitat, are generally open to wildlife watching, hiking, and hunting, except for closures to protect mating and nesting, or to reduce stress on wintering animals. National forests generally have a mix of maintained trails and roads, wilderness and undeveloped portions, and developed picnic and camping areas.

== Cattle and sheep grazing ==
Historically in the western United States, much public land is leased for grazing by cattle or sheep (most National Park Service areas are closed to livestock grazing). This includes vast tracts of National Forest and BLM land, as well as land on some Wildlife Refuges. National Parks are the exception. This use became controversial in the late 20th century as it was examined by environmentalists and scientists concerned about the impact of these exotic animals on native plant populations and watersheds.

== Oil and gas drilling and mining ==
Large tracts of public land in the United States are available for leasing for petroleum or mineral production. Lands which have a high likelihood of producing valuable resources can, as of 2018, command prices as high as $80,000 an acre per year. Large tracts of other lands, where the likelihood of the presence or successful exploitation of resources are very low, could be leased, as of 2018, for as low as $1.50 an acre per year. The Trump administration greatly expanded mineral leasing resulting in a substantial increase in fracking in likely locations in Wyoming and New Mexico, but a great deal of land where prospects for successful production were limited was leased at very low rates to speculators.

== Land-grant state universities ==
Land-grant universities

A land-grant university (also called land-grant college or land-grant institution) is an institution of higher education in the United States designated by a state to receive the benefits of the Morrill Acts of 1862 and 1890, or a beneficiary under the Equity in Educational Land-Grant Status Act of 1994. There are 57 institutions which fall under the 1862 Act, 19 under the 1890 Act, and 35 under the 1994 Act.

Signed by President Abraham Lincoln in 1862, the first Morrill Act began to fund educational institutions by granting federally owned land to the states for them to sell, to raise funds, to establish and endow "land-grant" colleges. The mission of these institutions as set forth in the 1862 act is to focus on the teaching of practical agriculture, science, military science, and engineering—although "without excluding other scientific and classical studies".

His mission was in sharp contrast to the historic practice of higher education concentrating entirely on a liberal arts curriculum based largely on Latin and Greek. The 1890 act required states that limited the enrollment in their land-grant school to the "white race" (in practice mostly those in the Southern United States) to provide a separate land-grant institution, in practice generally for African Americans (HBCUs). The 1994 expansion gave land-grant status and benefits to several tribal colleges and universities.

Ultimately, most Morill land-grant colleges became large public universities that today offer a full spectrum of educational opportunities. However, some land-grant colleges are private, including Cornell University, the Massachusetts Institute of Technology (MIT), and Tuskegee University. The 35 tribal colleges or universities are generally smaller institutions.

== Land sales: A Nebraska case study ==
The sale of public lands made possible the very rapid settlement of Nebraska. Railroads played a central role. The land was good for farms and ranches, but without transportation would be impossible to raise commercial crops. The railroad companies had been given large federal land grants that were used to back the borrowings from New York and London that financed construction. They were anxious to locate settlers upon the land as soon as possible, ensuring there would be a steady outflow of farm products and a steady inflow of manufactured items purchased by the farmers. Railroads like Union Pacific also built towns that were needed to service the railroad itself, with dining halls for passengers, construction crews, repair shops and housing for train crews. These towns attracted cattle drives and cowboys.

In the 1870s and 1880s Civil War veterans and immigrants from Northern Europe came by the thousands to take up land in Nebraska. The immigrants rapidly pushed westward the frontier line of settlement despite severe droughts, grasshopper plagues, economic distress, and other harsh conditions confronting the new settlers. Most of the great cattle ranches that had grown up near the ends of the trails from Texas gave way to farms, although the Sand Hills remained essentially a ranching country.

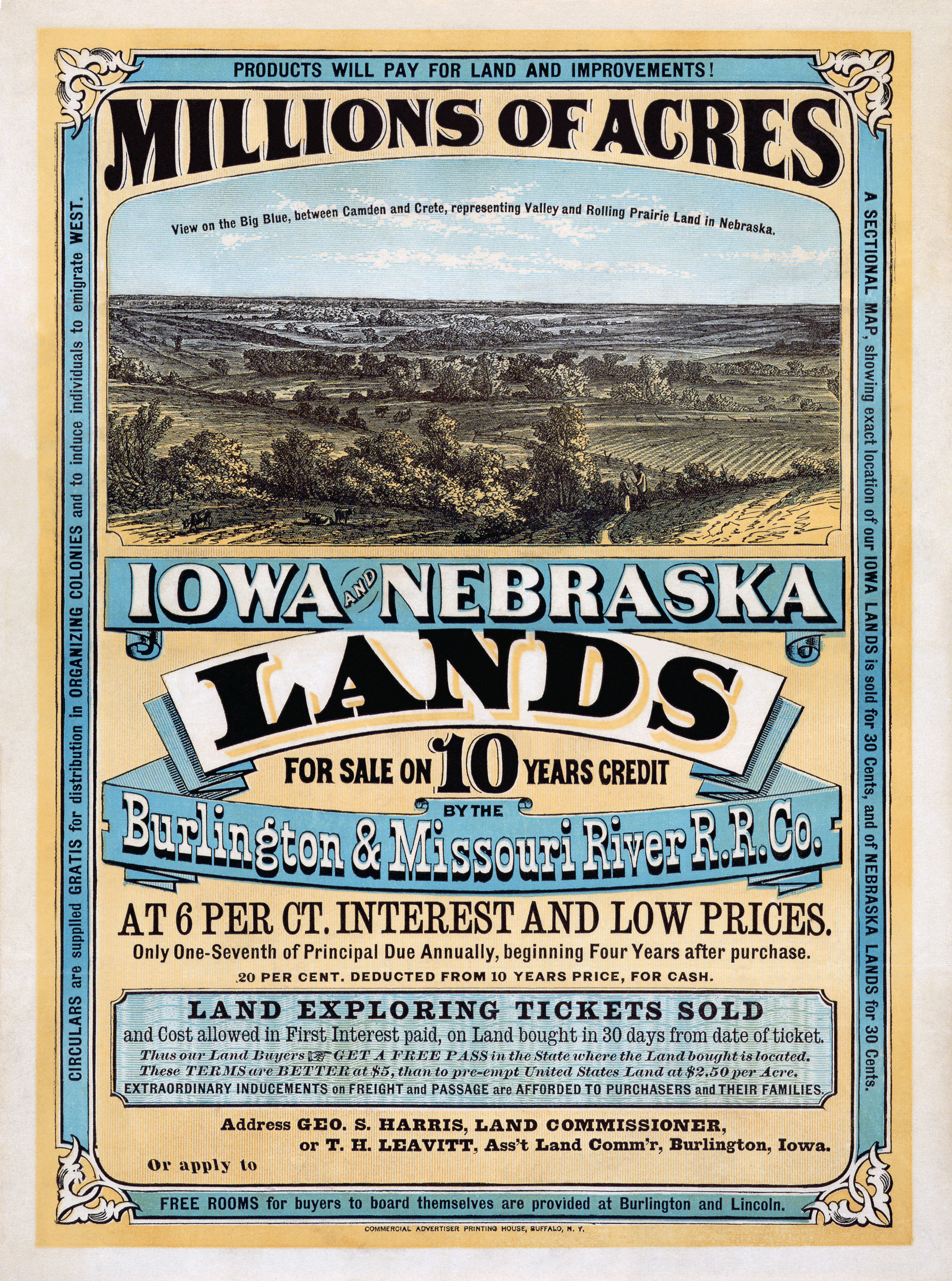
A land offer from the Burlington and Missouri River Railroad, 1872

The Union Pacific (UP) land grant gave it ownership of 12,800 acres per mile of finished track. The federal government kept every other section of land, rendering a surplus of 12,800 acres to sell or give away to homesteaders. The UP's goal was not to make a profit, but rather to build up a permanent clientele of farmers and townspeople who would form a solid basis for routine sales and purchases. The UP, like other major lines, opened sales offices in the East and in Europe to advertise their lands heavily far away and abroad, offering attractive package rates for migrant farmers to sell out and moved their entire family and necessary agricultural tools to the new destination. In 1870 the UP sold rich Nebraska farmland at five dollars an acre, with one fourth down and the remainder in three annual installments. It gave a 10 percent discount for cash. Farmers could also homestead land, getting it free from the federal government after five years, or even sooner by paying $1.50 an acre. Sales were improved by offering large blocks to ethnic colonies of European immigrants. Germans and Scandinavians, for example, could sell out their small farm back home and buy much larger farms for the same money. European ethnics comprised half of the population of Nebraska in the late 19th century. Married couples were usually the homesteaders, but single women were also eligible on their own.

A typical development program was that undertaken by the Burlington and Missouri River Railroad to promote settlement in southeastern Nebraska during 1870–80. The company participated enthusiastically in the boosterism campaigns that drew optimistic settlers to the state. The railroad offered farmers the opportunity to purchase land grant parcels on easy credit terms. Soil quality, topography, and distance from the railroad line generally determined railroad land prices. Immigrants and native-born migrants sometimes clustered in ethnic-based communities, but mostly the settlement of railroad land was by diverse mixtures of migrants. By deliberate campaigns, land sales, and a vast transportation network, the railroads facilitated and accelerated the peopling and development of the Great Plains, with railroads and water key to the potential for success in the Plains environment.

== Legal status of federal lands ==
Pursuant to the Property Clause of the United States Constitution (Article 4, section 3, clause 2), Congress has the power to retain, buy, sell, and regulate federal lands, such as by limiting cattle grazing on them. These powers have been recognized in a long series of United States Supreme Court decisions.

In Article I, Section 8, Clause 17 the United States Constitution empowers the federal government with exclusive legislative authority like that exercised for Washington D.C. over "Places purchased by the Consent of the Legislature of the State in which the same shall be, for the erection of Forts, Magazines, Arsenals, Dock-yards, and other needful Buildings."

Wilderness is a special designation for public lands which have been completely undeveloped. The concept of wilderness areas was legislatively defined by the 1964 Wilderness Act. Wilderness areas can be managed by any of the above Federal agencies, and some parks and refuges are almost entirely designated wilderness. A wilderness study area is a tract of land that has wilderness characteristics, and is managed as wilderness, but has not received a wilderness designation from Congress.

== See also ==
- Acquiring land for Los Alamos Laboratory
- Federal lands
- Public land#United States
- Geography of the United States#Public lands
