= Federal Lands Jobs and Energy Security Act =

- Long title: To streamline and ensure onshore energy permitting, provide for onshore leasing certainty, and give certainty to oil shale development for American energy security, economic development, and job creation, and for other purposes.
- Announced in: the 113th United States Congress
- Sponsored by: Rep. Doug Lamborn (R, CO-5)
- Number of co-sponsors: 0

Codification
- Acts affected: Mineral Leasing Act, Federal Water Pollution Control Act, National Environmental Policy Act of 1969, Endangered Species Act of 1973, Federal Land Policy and Management Act of 1976, Energy Policy Act of 2005, and others.
- U.S.C. sections affected: 30 U.S.C. § 226, 42 U.S.C. § 4321 et seq., 43 U.S.C. § 1701 et seq., 16 U.S.C. § 1531 et seq., 5 U.S.C. § 702, and others.
- Agencies affected: United States Congress, United States Department of Agriculture, United States Department of the Interior, Bureau of Land Management, United States Environmental Protection Agency, United States Army Corps of Engineers

Legislative history
- Introduced in the House as H.R. 1965 by Rep. Doug Lamborn (R, CO-5) on May 14, 2013; Committee consideration by United States House Committee on Natural Resources, United States House Committee on the Judiciary, United States House Natural Resources Subcommittee on Energy and Mineral Resources, United States House Judiciary Subcommittee on Regulatory Reform, Commercial and Antitrust Law

The Federal Lands Jobs and Energy Security Act (H.R. 1965) is a bill that would require the Bureau of Land Management (BLM) to establish certain fees for activities related to the development of oil and gas on federal lands. A portion of those amounts along with a portion of fees from renewable energy projects on federal lands would be available to the agency, subject to appropriation, to cover the costs of activities aimed at increasing energy development on federal lands. The bill also would exempt lawsuits related to energy production on federal lands from the Equal Access to Justice Act (EAJA). In addition, the legislation would require the BLM to offer for sale at least 25 percent of onshore federal lands nominated by firms for oil and gas leasing. It was introduced in the United States House of Representatives during the 113th United States Congress. President Barack Obama threatened to veto the bill on November 19, 2013.

== Provisions of the bill ==
The goal of the bill is to make "it easier for oil and gas companies to obtain drilling permits on federal lands." If this bill were to take effect, the United States Department of the Interior would then be forced to reject or approve onshore drilling permits within 60 days of the permit applications being submitted. If the Department fails to issue a ruling in that time window, the permit is automatically approved.

The bill would also make it more difficult for people to fight against drilling. The bill would create a "$5,000 dollar fee to lodge a formal protest of leases or drilling permits awarded to oil and gas producers."

The bill would also establish a minimum amount of federal land that must be offered for oil-and-gas leases.

== Congressional Research Service summary ==
This summary is based largely on the summary provided by the Congressional Research Service, a public domain source.

The Federal Lands Jobs and Energy Security Act would amend the Mineral Leasing Act to revise requirements for the issuance of permits to drill in energy projects on federal lands.

The bill would authorize the United States Secretary of the Interior to extend the initial 30-day permit application review period for up to 2 periods of 15 days each, if the Secretary has given written notice of the delay to the applicant.

The bill would deem a permit application approved if the Secretary has not made a decision on it by 60 days after its receipt. It would prescribe a notice requirement for denial of an application.

The bill would require the Secretary to collect a single $6,500 permit processing fee per application from each applicant at the time the decision is made whether or not to issue a permit.

The bill would require that specified minimum percentages of fees collected as annual wind energy and solar energy right-of-way authorization fees be available for the local Department of the Interior field office where they are collected, for Bureau of Land Management (BLM) permit approval activities, and to the Secretary for department-wide permitting activities.

The bill would require the Secretary to collect a $5,000 documentation fee to accompany each protest for a lease, right of way, or application for permit to drill.

The bill would require the Secretary to: (1) establish a Federal Permit Streamlining Project in every BLM Field office with responsibility for permitting energy projects on federal land, and (2) enter into a related memorandum of understanding with the United States Secretary of Agriculture, the Administrator of the Environmental Protection Agency (EPA), and the Chief of the Army Corps of Engineers.

The bill would require federal signatories to such memorandum to assign staff with special expertise to BLM field offices.

The bill would state that the Secretary shall not require a finding of extraordinary circumstances related to a categorical exclusion in administering the Energy Policy Act of 2005 (EPA 2005) with respect to review under the National Environmental Policy Act of 1969 (NEPA).

(A "categorical exclusion" under NEPA is a category of actions which do not individually or cumulatively have a significant effect on the human environment and which have been found to have no such effect in procedures adopted by a federal agency in implementing environmental regulations and for which, therefore, neither an environmental assessment nor an environmental impact statement is required.)

The bill would set forth procedures for judicial review of leasing of federal lands for the exploration, development, production, processing, or transmission of oil, natural gas, wind, or any other energy source of energy.

The bill would direct the Secretary, in conducting lease sales under the Mineral Leasing Act, to offer for sale at least 25% of the annual nominated acreage not previously made available for lease.

The bill would shield such acreage from protest and the test of extraordinary circumstances, but makes it eligible for certain categorical exclusions under EPA 2005 and NEPA.

The bill would amend the Mineral Leasing Act to prohibit the Secretary from: (1) withdrawing any covered energy project issued under that Act without finding a violation of lease terms by the lessee; (2) delaying indefinitely issuance of project approvals, drilling and seismic permits, and rights of way for activities under a lease; and (3) cancelling or withdrawing any lease parcel after a competitive lease sale has occurred and a winning bidder has made the last payment for the parcel.

The bill would instruct the Secretary to: (1) make nominated areas available for lease within 18 months after an area is designated as open under a current land use plan, (2) issue all leases sold 60 days after the last payment is made, and (3) adjudicate any lease protests filed following a lease sale.

The bill would prohibit additional lease stipulations (except certain emergency stipulations) after the parcel is sold without consultation and agreement of the lessee.

The bill would require federal land managers to follow existing resource management plans and continue to actively lease in areas designated as open when resource management plans are being amended or revised, until such time as a new record of decision is signed.

The bill would declare without force or effect Bureau of Land Management Instruction Memorandum 2010-117.

The bill would deem the final regulations regarding oil shale management published by the BLM on November 18, 2008, to satisfy all legal and procedural requirements under any law, including the Federal Land Policy and Management Act of 1976, the Endangered Species Act of 1973, NEPA, and EPA 2005. It would direct the Secretary of the Interior to implement those regulations, including the oil shale leasing program they authorize, without any other administrative action necessary.

It would deem the November 17, 2008, U.S. Bureau of Land Management Approved Resource Management Plan Amendments/Record of Decision for Oil Shale and Tar Sands Resources to Address Land Use Allocations in Colorado, Utah, and Wyoming and Final Programmatic Environmental Impact Statement also to satisfy all legal and procedural requirements under any law. Directs the Secretary to implement the oil shale leasing program in those areas covered by the resource management plans amended by such amendments, and covered by such record of decision, without any other administrative action necessary.

The bill would direct the Secretary to hold a lease sale, within 180 days after enactment of this Act, that offers an additional 10 parcels for lease for research, development, and demonstration of oil shale resources under the terms offered in the solicitation of bids for such leases published on January 15, 2009.

The bill would require the Secretary, by January 1, 2016, to hold at least 5 separate commercial lease sales, in multiple lease blocs, in areas of at least 25,000 acres, which: (1) have been nominated through public comment, and (2) are considered to have the most potential for oil shale development.

== Congressional Budget Office report ==
This summary is based largely on the summary provided by the Congressional Budget Office, as ordered reported by the House Committee on Natural Resources on July 24, 2013. This is a public domain source.

H.R. 1965 would require the Bureau of Land Management (BLM) to establish certain fees for activities related to the development of oil and gas on federal lands. A portion of those amounts along with a portion of fees from renewable energy projects on federal lands would be available to the agency, subject to appropriation, to cover the costs of activities aimed at increasing energy development on federal lands. The bill also would exempt lawsuits related to energy production on federal lands from the Equal Access to Justice Act (EAJA). In addition, the legislation would require the BLM to offer for sale at least 25 percent of onshore federal lands nominated by firms for oil and gas leasing. Finally, the bill would establish a commercial leasing program for oil shale resources (a type of rock that can be heated to extract an organic compound used to produce synthetic crude oil) on federal lands.

Based on information provided by the BLM, the Department of Justice (DOJ), the Department of the Treasury, and certain environmental groups, the Congressional Budget Office (CBO) estimated that enacting the legislation would increase offsetting receipts, which are treated as reductions in direct spending, by $325 million over the 2014-2023 period; therefore, pay-as-you-go procedures apply. In addition, the CBO estimated that implementing the legislation would cost $186 million over the 2014-2018 period and $329 million over the 2014-2023 period, assuming appropriation of the authorized and necessary amounts. Enacting the bill would not affect revenues.

H.R. 1965 contains no intergovernmental or private-sector mandates as defined in the Unfunded Mandates Reform Act.

== Procedural history ==
The Federal Lands Jobs and Energy Security Act was introduced into the United States House of Representatives by Rep. Doug Lamborn (R, CO-5) on May 14, 2013. It was referred to the United States House Committee on Natural Resources, the United States House Committee on the Judiciary, the United States House Natural Resources Subcommittee on Energy and Mineral Resources, and the United States House Judiciary Subcommittee on Regulatory Reform, Commercial and Antitrust Law. The House Natural Resources Subcommittee on Energy and Mineral Resources held hearings about the bill on May 22, 2013. Jamie Connell testified at the hearing on behalf of the Bureau of Land Management. On July 24, 2013, the House Committee on Natural Resources ordered reported (amended) the bill by a vote of 27-14 alongside House Report 113-262 part 1. On November 15, 2013, House Majority Leader Eric Cantor announced that the bill would be considered on November 19, 2013. In addition to considering the bill, the House as a whole would also consider eight proposed amendments.

On November 19, 2013, the White House threatened to veto the bill.

== Debate and discussion ==
The Department of the Interior opposed the bill, citing why in testimony before the House Natural Resources Committee Subcommittee on Energy and Mineral Resources.

On November 19, 2013, President Barack Obama released a statement that his administration "strongly opposes" the bill, because it "favor an arbitrary standard for leasing in open areas over leasing on the basis of greatest resource potential; limit the public's opportunity to engage in decisions about the use of public lands; raise the potential for costly litigation, protests, and delays; strip the ability of the Department of the Interior to issue permits to drill based on important environmental reviews, clearances and tribal consultation; and curtail the use of public lands for other uses like hunting, fishing, and recreation." President Obama threatened to veto the bill.

== See also ==
- List of bills in the 113th United States Congress
- Energy in the United States
