= General Mining Act of 1872 =

United States federal law

General Mining Law of 1872
- Long title: An Act to promote the Development of the Mining Resources of the United States.
- Enacted by: the 42nd United States Congress

Citations
- Statutes at Large: Sess. 2, ch. 152, 17 Stat. 91–96

Legislative history
- Introduced in the House as H. R. No. 1016 by Aaron A. Sargent (R-CA) on January 15, 1872; Committee consideration by House Mines, Senate Mines; Passed the House on January 23, 1872 (voice vote); Passed the Senate on April 16, 1872 (voice vote) with amendment; House agreed to Senate amendment on April 29, 1872 (voice vote); Signed into law by President Ulysses S. Grant on May 10, 1872

Major amendments
- Amendments

The General Mining Act of 1872 is a United States federal law that authorizes and governs prospecting and mining for economic minerals, such as gold, platinum, and silver, on federal public lands. This law, approved on May 10, 1872, codified the informal system of acquiring and protecting mining claims on public land, formed by prospectors in California and Nevada from the late 1840s through the 1860s, such as during the California Gold Rush. All citizens of the United States of America 18 years or older have the right under the 1872 mining law to locate a lode (hard rock) or placer (gravel) mining claim on federal lands open to mineral entry. These claims may be located once a discovery of a locatable mineral is made. Locatable minerals include but are not limited to platinum, gold, silver, copper, lead, zinc, uranium and tungsten.

== Western miners' codes ==
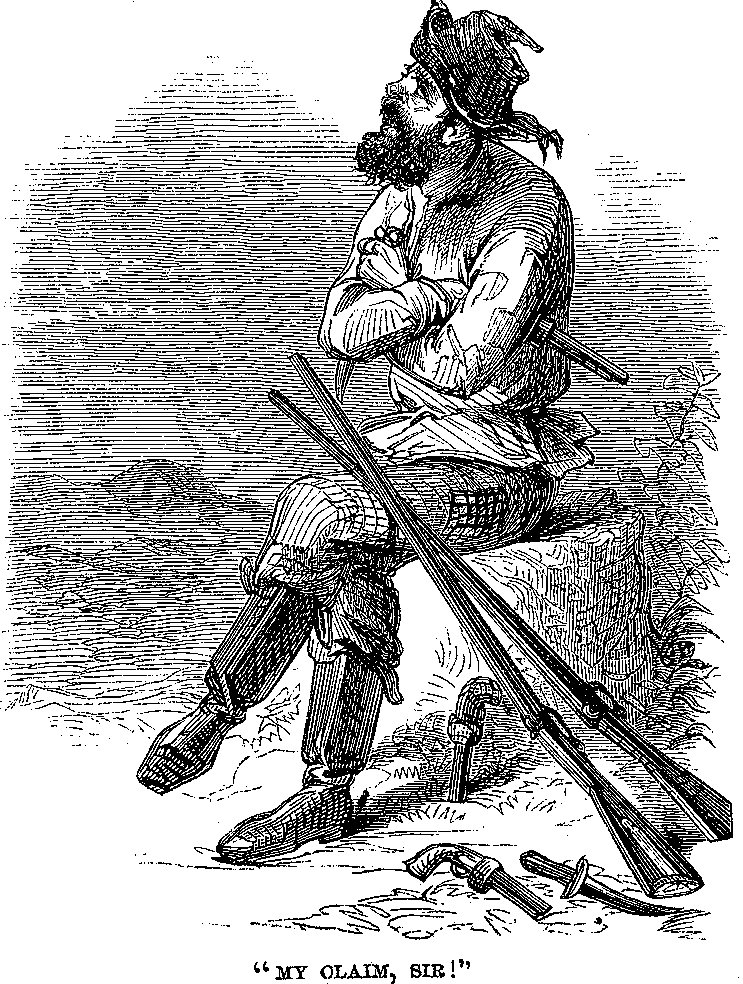
"My claim, Sir!" A prospector defends his claim at the Comstock Lode, 1861.

Miners and prospectors in the California Gold Rush of 1849 found themselves in a legal vacuum. Although the US federal government had laws governing the leasing of mineral land, the United States had only recently acquired California by the Treaty of Guadalupe Hidalgo, and had little presence in the newly acquired territories.

Miners organized their own governments in each new mining camp (for example the Great Republic of Rough and Ready), and adopted the Mexican mining laws then existing in California that gave the discoverer right to explore and mine gold and silver on public land. Miners moved from one camp to the next, and made the rules of all camps more or less the same, usually differing only in specifics such as in the maximum size of claims, and the frequency with which a claim had to be worked to avoid being forfeited and subject to being claimed by someone else. California miners spread the concept all over the west with each new mining rush, and the practices spread to all the states and territories west of the Great Plains.

== Mining legislation before 1872 ==
Although the practices for open mining on public land were more-or-less universal in the West, and supported by state and territorial legislation, they were still illegal under existing federal law. At the end of the American Civil War, some eastern congressmen regarded western miners as squatters who were robbing the public patrimony, and proposed seizure of the western mines to pay the huge war debt. In June 1865, Representative George Washington Julian of Indiana introduced a bill for the government to take the western mines from their discoverers, and sell them at public auction. Representative Fernando Wood proposed that the government send an army to California, Colorado, and Arizona to expel the miners "by armed force if necessary to protect the rights of the Government in the mineral lands." He advocated that the federal government itself work the mines for the benefit of the treasury.

Western representatives successfully argued that western miners and prospectors were performing valuable services by promoting commerce and settling new territory. In 1864, Congress passed a law that instructed courts deciding questions of contested mining rights to ignore federal ownership, and defer to the miners in actual possession of the ground. The following year, Congressional supporters of western miners tacked legislation legalizing lode (hardrock) mining on public land onto a law regarding ditch and canal rights in California, Oregon, and Nevada. The legislation, known as the "Chaffee laws" after Colorado Territorial representative Jerome B. Chaffee, passed and was signed on July 26, 1866.

Congress extended similar rules to placer mining claims in the "placer law" signed into law on July 9, 1870.

== The Mining Law of 1872 ==
The Chaffee law of 1869 and the placer law of 1871 were combined into the General Mining Act of 1872. The mining law of 1866 had given discoverers rights to stake mining claims to extract gold, silver, cinnabar (the principal ore of mercury) and copper. When Congress passed the General Mining Act of 1872, the wording was changed to "or other valuable deposits," giving greater scope to the law. The 1872 law was codified as 30 U.S.C. §§ 22-42

The 1872 act also granted extralateral rights to lode claims, and fixed the maximum size of lode claims as 1500 feet (457m) long and 600 feet (183m) wide.

The Act of 1872 also set the price for land assumed under the mining act:

FORTY-SECOND CONGRESS. Sess. II Ch. 152. 1872. (approved July ninth, eighteen hundred and seventy) a patent shall issue for the placer-claim, including such vein or lode, upon the payment of five dollars per acre such vein or lode claim, and twenty-five feet of surface on each side thereof. The remainder of the placer-claim, or any placer-claim not embracing any vein or lode claim, shall be paid for at the rate of two dollars and fifty cents per acre, together with all costs of proceedings;.

It set the price of the land claim to range $2.50 to $5.00 per acre. This price set by law has remained the same since 1872.

Investors in an alleged diamond deposit in the western United States that became known as the Diamond Hoax of 1872 paid Benjamin F. Butler for amending the General Mining Act of 1872 to include the terms "valuable mineral deposits" in order to allow legal mining claims in the diamond fields.

== Volume and worth ==
The Mineral Policy Center estimates that mining companies extract $2 billion to $3 billion in minerals from public lands every year. From 1872 to 1993, mining companies produced more than $230 billion from lands claimed under the Act, according to the Mineral Policy Center.

== Terminology ==
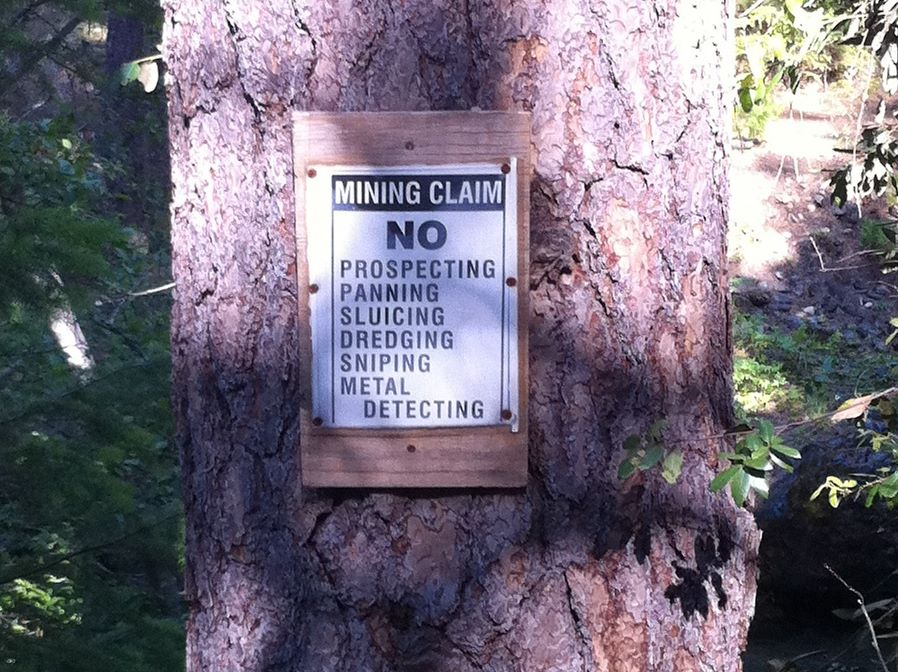
Mining claim posted: NO Prospecting, Panning, Sluicing ... South Yuba River, California 2011 photo.

A mining claim is the right to explore for and extract minerals from a tract of land.

Claim staking is the required procedure of marking the boundaries of the mining claim, typically with wooden posts or substantial piles of rocks. Each western state has slightly different requirements for claim staking. Once the claim is staked, the prospector documents the claim by filing required forms. Originally the forms were filed with the mining district recorder; today they are filed with the Clerk of the County in which the claim is located, and with the US Bureau of Land Management. Papers are likewise filed to document annual assessment work.

A lode claim, also known in California as a quartz claim, is a claim over a hard rock deposit.

A placer claim is a claim over gold-bearing sand or gravel, often along a stream or river.

The mining law opens up land in the public domain, that is, federal land that has been owned by the federal government since it became part of the United States, and that has never been set aside for a specific use. Land dedicated for specific uses such as the White House lawn, national parks, or wilderness areas, is not subject to mineral entry. Land west of the Great Plains managed by the US Forest Service or the Bureau of Land Management, unless designated as wilderness area, is generally open to mining claims. Federal land on or east of the Great Plains was generally acquired by the federal government through purchase, and so is not considered public domain, and is not subject to mining claims.

The mining law applies to some mineral products, but not others, and the list has changed over time. Since 1920, the list of locatable minerals does not include petroleum, coal, phosphate, sodium, and potassium. Rights to explore for and extract these are leased through competitive bidding. Common construction material such as sand and gravel are obtained by purchase.

All mining claims are initially unpatented claims, which give the right only for those activities necessary to exploration and mining, and last only as long as the claim is worked every year. For instance, the failure to prosecute the work on the tunnel for six months is considered the abandonment of rights to all the undiscovered veins on the line of the tunnels. In addition, at least $100 worth of labor shall be performed or improvements made annually. If this does not occur, the claim or mine upon which such failure occurred shall be made to relocation in the same manner as if no location of the same had ever been made. The original mining law gave miners the opportunity to obtain patents (deeds from the government), much as farmers could obtain title under the Homestead Act. The owner of a patented claim can put it to any legal use. The process of patenting claims has been perhaps the most controversial part of the mining law. Because of a Congress-imposed moratorium, the federal government has not accepted any new applications for mining claim patents since October 1, 1994.

The 1872 law granted extra lateral rights to owners of lode claims. This gave the owners of the surface outcrop of a vein the right to follow and mine the vein wherever it led, even if its subsurface extension continued beneath other mining claims. This provision, also known as the law of the apex led to lengthy litigation and even underground battles, especially in Butte, Montana, and the Comstock Lode.

== Subsequent amendments ==
The acquisition of mining rights on public land in the West is mostly governed by the 1872 act. Subsequent changes to the law include:

- Timber and Stone Act, an 1878 law that allowed private purchase of minable government land was codified as 43 U.S.C. §§ 311, 313, but subsequently repealed;
- the Mineral Leasing Act of 1920, 30 U.S.C. §§ 181 et. seq., which made certain nonmetallic minerals, such as petroleum and oil shale, not open to claim staking;
- the Mineral Materials Act of 1947, 30 U.S.C. § 601, et. seq., which provides for the sale or public giveaway of certain minerals, such as sand or gravel;
- the Multiple Mineral Use Act of 1954 (Multiple Mineral Development Act), 30 U.S.C. Ch. 12, which provided for the development of multiple minerals on the same tracts of public land;
- the Multiple Surface Use Mining Act of 1955, 30 U.S.C. § 611, which withdrew common varieties from mineral entry; and
- the Federal Land Policy and Management Act of 1976, 43 U.S.C. § 1744, part of which redefines claim recording procedures and provides for abandonment if the procedures are not followed.
- Since 1 October 1994 Congress has imposed budget restrictions which have prevented the Bureau of Land Management from accepting new applications for patents on mining claims.

Provisions of the 1872 Mining Law were changed with the implementation of the 1976 Federal Land Policy Management Act (FLPMA) effective as of January 1981. Many of the provisions of FLPMA revised the surface uses allowed on mining claims under the 1872 mining law by halting or restricting unnecessary or undue degradation of the public lands. The regulation portion of the FLPMA is found at 43 CFR 3809 ("Surface Management regulations"). These regulations were updated and the final rules published in December 2001. These rules effectively replace many of the 1872 Mining Law provisions and require mining reclamation, financial guarantees for reclamation to the Federal government, mining claim occupation permits and detailed Mining Plans of Operations to be submitted to the governing agencies before disturbing the surface.

== Related legislation ==
=== Hardrock Mining and Reclamation Act of 2007 ===
On November 1, 2007, the US House passed the Hardrock Mining and Reclamation Act of 2007 (H.R. 2262) by a vote of 244–116. The bill would have permanently ended new patents for mining claims, imposed a royalty of 4% of gross revenues on existing mining extracting from unpatented mining claims, and placed an 8% royalty on new mining operations. Mining of private mineral rights (including patented mining claims) would not have been affected. Seventy percent of the royalty money would have gone to a cleanup fund for past abandoned mining operations, and 30% to affected communities. The National Mining Association maintained that, in combination with existing federal, state, and local taxes, the royalty imposed by the bill would have burdened US mining with the highest effective tax rate in the world. The bill was not acted upon by the Senate, and died at the end of the 110th Congress in January 2009.

=== Hardrock Mining and Reclamation Act of 2009 ===
The Hardrock Mining and Reclamation Act of 2009 was introduced in the US Senate by Jeff Bingaman (D-New Mexico), but died in committee.

The proposed bill provided that the secretary of the interior will establish a royalty rate of from 8% to 15% of the value of locateable mineral production from any new mines on federal mineral lands. Mines in production on the date of the bill's enactment would not be subject to the royalty. In addition, a reclamation tax of from 0.3% to 1%, the rate set by the secretary of the interior, would be levied on all hardrock mining operations, new and existing, on federal, state, private, and tribal lands. The royalties and reclamation taxes would be used to reclaim abandoned hardrock mines.

The proposed legislation was backed by the Obama administration. Interior Secretary Ken Salazar stated "There is a new administration in town, and we want to see the 1872 mining law reformed." However, in 2010, Senate majority leader, Senator Harry Reid (D-NV), who was thought to oppose the bill as written, announced that, due to other legislative priorities, the bill would not be acted upon before Congress adjourned, and so the bill died at the end of the 111th United States Congress in January 2011.

=== Hardrock Mining and Reclamation Act of 2014 ===
The Hardrock Mining and Reclamation Act of 2014 was introduced by Rep. Peter DeFazio (D-Oregon) on July 10, 2014. Rep. Peter DeFazio stated "For over 140 years, the federal government has allowed mining companies to extract hundreds of billions of dollars' worth of valuable publicly owned minerals from our public lands without paying American taxpayers a single dime." This bill was built off of the previous Hardrock Mining and Reclamation Act of 2007.

The proposed bill would have prohibited patent grants from all mining or millsites claimed after September 30, 1994. The bill would have established a maintenance fee and a 4% to 8% royalty of the gross incomes of all unpatented mining or millsite claims.

The bill would have also assigned protections to lands, such as areas of wilderness study and areas of environmental concern, that would no longer be open to mining and millsite claims. In addition, the bill would have created the Hardrock Minerals Fund, which would require a payment to the Secretary of the Interior of 7 cents per ton of displaced mining material, paid for by all operators of a hardrock mining site. These funds would then be allocated to land and water resources that were impacted negatively by mining operations.

The proposed bill, however, died at the end of the 113th Congress in January 2015.

=== Hardrock Mining Reform and Reclamation Act of 2015 ===
The Hardrock Mining Reform and Reclamation Act of 2015 was introduced to the 114th Congress by Rep. Raul Grijalva (D-Arizona) on February 13, 2015. This proposed bill was built off of the Hardrock Mining and Reclamation Act of 2014. The bill died in committee.

=== Hardrock Mining and Reclamation Act of 2015 ===
The Hardrock Mining and Reclamation Act of 2015 was introduced to the 114th Congress by Sen. Tom Udall (D-New Mexico) on November 5, 2015.

Sen. Tom Udall stated that the Gold King Mine spill of 2015, which spilled 3 million gallons of acid wastewater into the Animas River watershed, was a key factor in introducing the bill. Sen. Udall introduced the bill as a way to make mine operators responsible for mine spills and stated "We cannot wait for more disasters like the Gold King mine spill for us to act. We cannot continue to do nothing while thousands of abandoned hardrock mines drain toxic metals into our rivers, water supplies, and our drinking water each and every day."

The proposed bill, built upon the Hardrock Mining Reform and Reclamation Act of 2015, included a specified maintenance fee of all unpatented claims, with a $150 fee for each claim along with a $50 location fee. The bill adjusted the percentage of royalties collected from mining production to between 2% and 5% and stated that all mining operators are required to present to the Secretary of the Interior the financial ability to pay for any damages to any land and water resources affected by mining. The bill proposed the establishment of the Hardrock Minerals Reclamation Fund and a requirement that all mining operators pay a fee of 0.6% to 2% of the annual production value of each mine. The bill died in the 114th Congress.

=== Hardrock Mining and Reclamation Act of 2017 ===
The Hardrock Mining and Reclamation Act of 2017 was introduced by Sen. Tom Udall (D-New Mexico) on September 9, 2017.

The bill proposed builds off of the Hardrock Mining and Reclamation Act of 2015 and requires the Secretary of the Interior to set the percentage of royalties to be collected from mining productions. The bill died in the 115th Congress.

== See also ==
- Mining in the United States
- United States General Land Office
- Binger Hermann
- Benson Syndicate
- Cripple Creek & Victor Gold Mine
