= Elmer F. Bennett =

American lawyer

- Born: September 17, 1917; Longmont, Colorado
- Died: July 10, 1989 (aged 71); Roslyn, New York
- Occupation: Attorney

Elmer F. Bennett (September 17, 1917 – July 10, 1989) was an attorney who held various positions in the United States Department of the Interior during Dwight D. Eisenhower's administration. Bennett specialized in the legal problems of the use of natural resources.

In later years Bennett worked for the Public Land Law Review Commission and then for the Office of Emergency Preparedness. In the latter office he dealt with the problem of oil imports and oil price increases in the early 1970s.

Bennett died of congestive heart failure on July 10, 1989, in Roslyn, New York, where he had been living since 1983.
