= National Public Lands Day =

American September observance

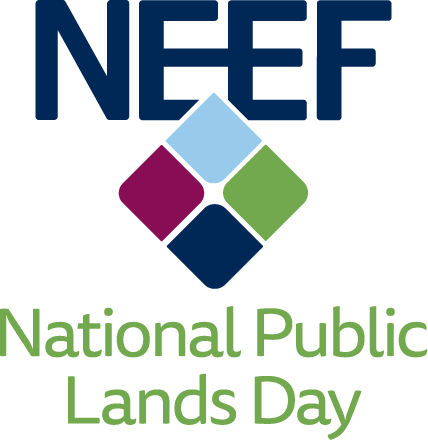
- Observed by: Public lands at the federal, state, regional and local level within the United States, the District of Columbia and territories of the United States
- Celebrations: Volunteer to improve the health of public lands, parks and historic sites.
- Date: 4th Saturday in September
- 2025 date: September 27
- 2026 date: September 26
- 2027 date: September 25
- 2028 date: September 23
- Frequency: Annual

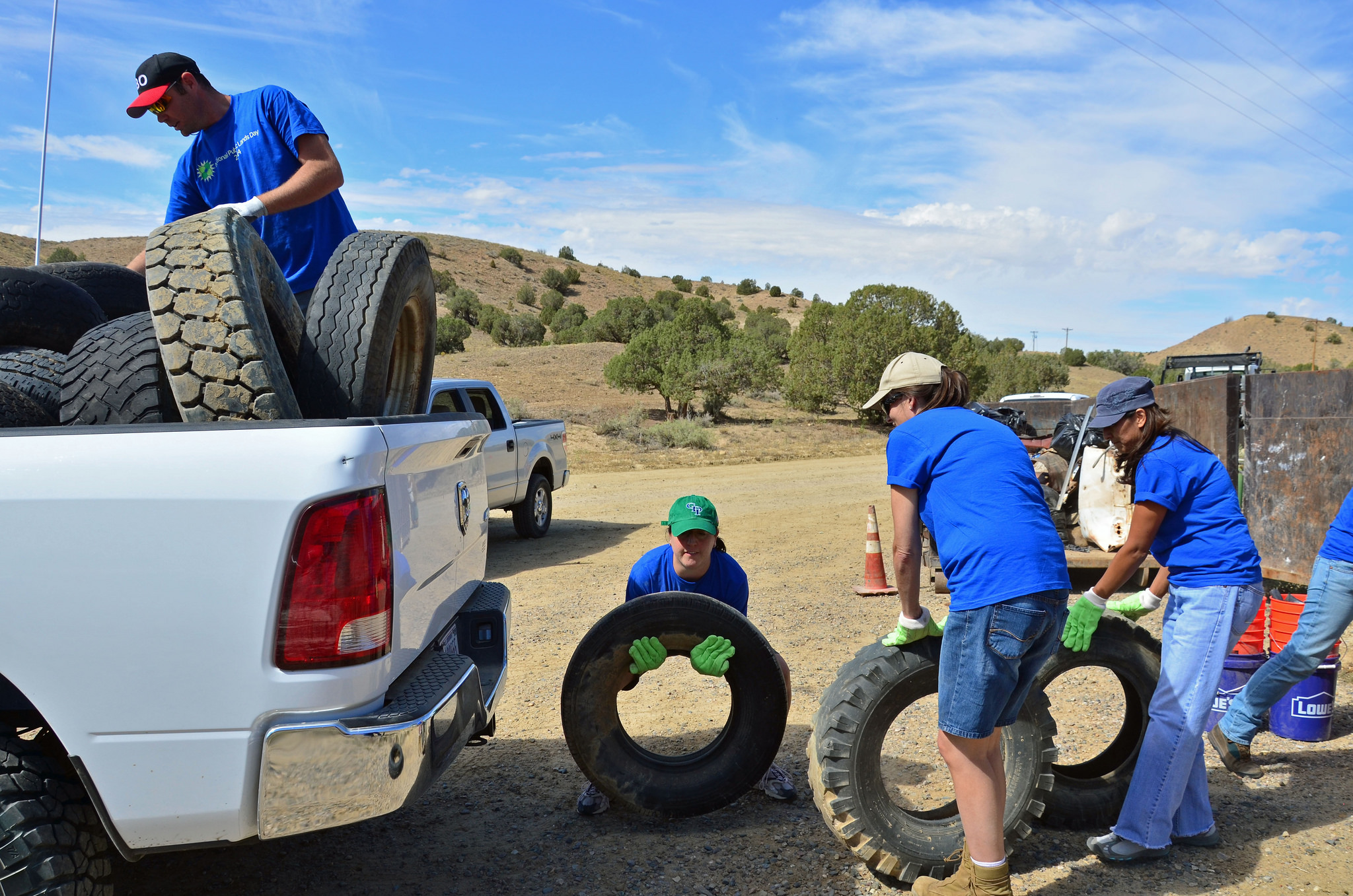
Volunteers collecting trash for National Public Lands Day 2014

National Public Lands Day (NPLD) is celebrated annually at public lands in the United States on the fourth Saturday of September. A signature event of the National Environmental Education Foundation, it promotes both popular enjoyment and volunteer conservation of public lands.

== History ==
Three federal agencies and 700 volunteers launched the first National Public Lands Day in 1994. By 2010, participation grew to 170,000 volunteers at over 2,000 sites across the country, the District of Columbia and U.S. territories. In addition to National Public Lands Day being a fee-free day (free entry day) at many federally managed lands, volunteers who participate at federal land sites are rewarded with coupons for free entry into their favorite federal public land areas that have entrance fees.

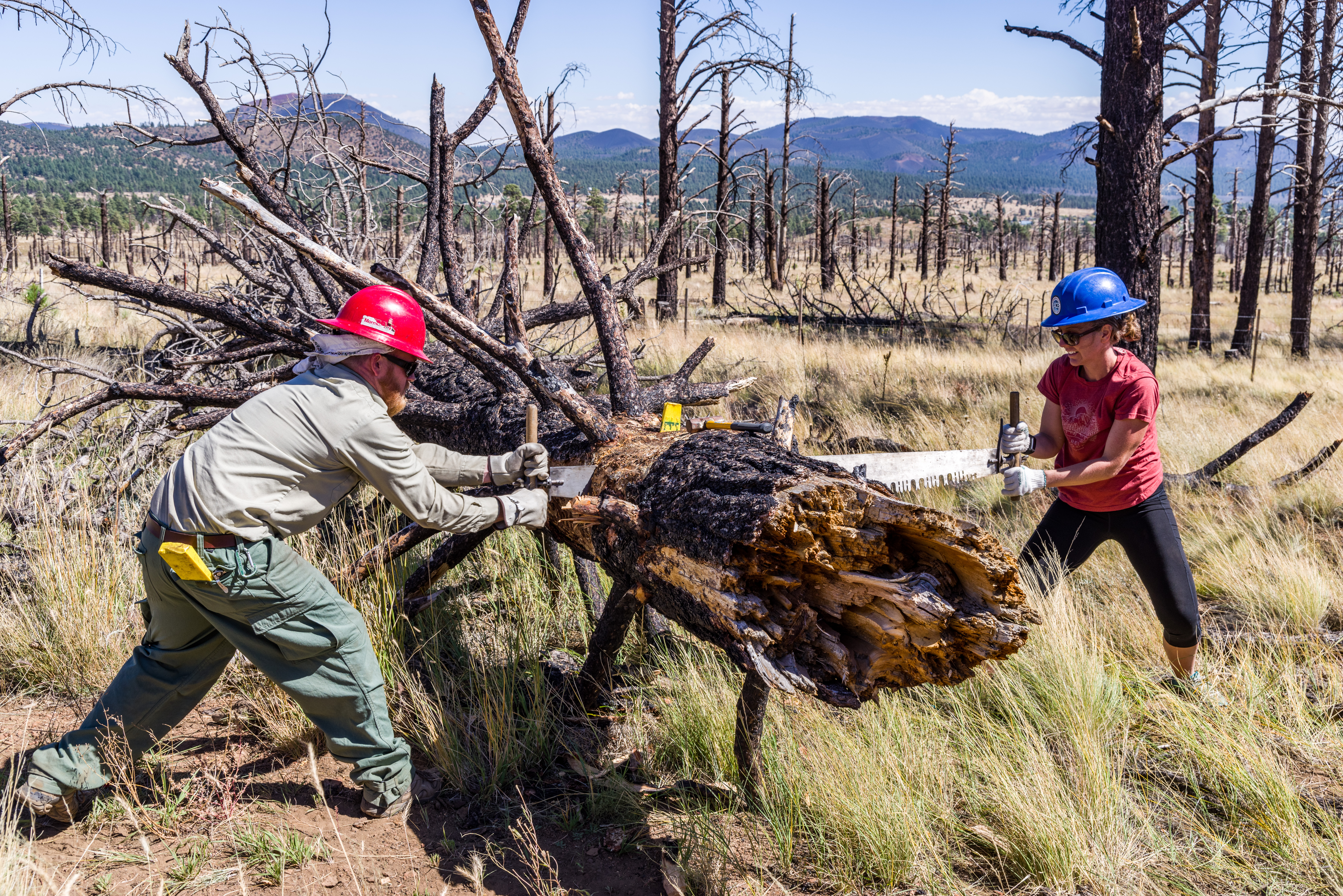
National Public Lands Day 2017

The 2008 event featured an initiative to plant one million trees in honor of the 75th anniversary of the Civilian Conservation Corps.
