= Public domain (land) =

Land that cannot be sold

Public domain land is land controlled by a government that either legally belongs to the citizenry and cannot be sold or can be sold. Public domain land is managed by a public entity—such as a state, region, province or municipality—directly or by institutes or state companies. It is called dominio público (Spanish), domínio público (Portuguese), domaine public (French) or demanio pubblico (Italian).

== United States ==
Map of all federally owned land in the United States.

In the United States, land is public domain if it has belonged to the federal government since the 13 original colonies bought it from indigenous tribes or from other countries, and has not been dedicated to a specific use. For most of the nation's early history, the federal government sought to promote settlement of the expanding frontier by deeding the public domain to states and private interests through the auspices of the United States General Land Office. The authority for this came under laws such as the Homestead Act, the Timber and Stone Act, and the Morrill Act.

Creation of the first public domain of the United States, the Northwest Territory, began an epoch in American political history. The government decided early to create new states from it, to add to the union in full equality to the original 13 states. Its subsequent expansion, the mode of its administration, legislation for its government, its relation to constitutional questions, the diplomacy and politics involved in its acquisition, its international boundary questions, the enactment of settlement laws, the attraction of immigrants and growth of population, internal improvements and increased facilities of transportation, the discovery of precious metals, and other topics of interest might be cited here in connection with the public domain.

=== History ===
During the American Revolutionary War, Congress spent vast sums and the nation was in debt. The government promised soldiers land in lieu of pay. After the Revolution, the new federal government owned all the public land except that within the 13 original colonies and a few non-original states. The land owned by the government was called The Public Domain. The Land Act of 1785 gave land warrants to the soldiers to fulfill the promise. The act also allowed the Treasury Department to sell land in auctions to the highest bidders. A new surveying system was created. The first auction was held in D.C., but the land sold was in Ohio. Soldiers could not afford to travel to Ohio to see the land, and then back to D.C. for the auction. Soldiers sold their warrants, often too cheaply. The government sold 640 acres at a time, minimum. Small farmers could not afford the prices. Speculators bought the warrants, purchased land, and sold the land in smaller lots to small farmers, at a huge profit.

Later, the government lowered the minimum acres, and sold land on credit, and offered some free land. The government made more money this way by copying the speculators' method. The government gained other land in time. States were then carved out of the public domain. The government has sold or given away over one billion acres of land. Five million land patents were granted. The Bureau of Land Management grew from the older United States General Land Office and now controls public domain land.

== Europe ==
=== Italy ===
In Italian law, public domain (demanio) derives from Roman law and then took on its modern form during defeudalisation. The Italian public domain is governed by the Italian Civil Code, article 822 and following. In Italy, public domain is not the same thing of public estate: if the second one can be sell or rent in any moment, the main characteristic of the assets forming the public domain is their inalienability and imprescriptibility. In particular, all citizens have the right to access and transit to and through the coastline, but they may not erect there any durable construction.

Italian public domain is divided in two categories: necessary domain and incidental domain. The necessary domain includes the whole coastline, roadsteads, ports, rivers, lakes, acquifers, other specific water bodies and all the works necessary for national defence purposes. The accidental domain includes railways, streets, monuments and libraries, but only if they belong to the State.

Local authorities may also own public domain, and in this case we speak about regional or municipality domain.

Private individuals are allowed to take advantage of Italian public domain only behind specific concessions, which are always time-limited, are awarded through public tenders and involve the payment of a fee.

== See also ==
- Public land
- Eminent domain
- General Mining Act of 1872
- Acquired lands
