= Abandoned Shipwrecks Act =

US legislation

Abandoned Shipwreck Act
- Long title: An Act to establish the title of States in certain abandoned shipwrecks, and for other purposes.
- Acronyms (colloquial): ASA
- Nicknames: Abandoned Shipwreck Act of 1987
- Enacted by: the 100th United States Congress
- Effective: April 28, 1988

Citations
- Public law: 100-298
- Statutes at Large: 102 Stat. 432

Codification
- Titles amended: 43 U.S.C.: Public Lands
- U.S.C. sections created: 43 U.S.C. ch. 39 § 2101

Legislative history
- Introduced in the Senate as S. 858 by Bill Bradley (D-NJ) on March 26, 1987; Committee consideration by Senate Energy and Natural Resources, House Interior and Insular Affairs, House Merchant Marine and Fisheries; Passed the Senate on December 19, 1987 (passed voice vote); Passed the House on March 29, 1988 (263-139) with amendment; House agreed to House amendment on April 13, 1988 (340-64, in lieu of H.Res. 421); Signed into law by President Ronald Reagan on April 28, 1988

The Abandoned Shipwrecks Act is a piece of United States legislation passed into law in 1988. The Act was a neutral law to transfer ownership of applicable shipwrecks in U.S. state waters from the federal government to the state where the shipwreck was located. The drafter of the legislation was Dr. Anne Giesecke. The legislation is brief, by design, and aims to resolve a jurisdictional conflict between the Federal Court sitting in Admiralty and state governments managing state land, particularly the excavation of state land.

The Abandoned Shipwreck Act has been touted for several positive evolutions in shipwreck management. This includes expanded historic shipwreck programs or the creation of such programs, the ASA has led to a change in the culture surrounding diving shipwrecks, and ASA has helped to educate the states and the public about the value of these resources.

Before the passage of the Abandoned Shipwreck Act, "only 27 states had laws specifically addressing their underwater resources. Now, all states have evaluated their legal systems as they apply to underwater resources and where necessary have modified their laws." Several states now have maritime archeologists that help the state perform documentation of shipwrecks, help determine their historical value, and provide divers with information and education on the states' efforts to preserve shipwrecks.

== Background ==
Improvements in SCUBA equipment helped to make once out-of-reach shipwrecks, reachable. This created a dive community which initially pilfered from the shipwrecks with impunity--in many cases it was the norm to take from the shipwrecks to show that you had reached it. "At the same time, George Bass and Peter Throckmorton began making efforts to have shipwrecks recognized as archaeological sites because of their value in telling stories about human culture." With the recognition of the historical value of these shipwrecks readily apparent, the discovery of the Titanic thrusted the status of shipwrecks into the zeitgeist of lawmakers at the federal level.

The Abandoned Shipwrecks Act (Pub. L. 100-298; 43 U.S.C. §§ 2101–2106), also known as the Abandoned Shipwrecks Act of 1987, was passed into law due to these developments as well as the severe damage to some 3,000 historic wrecks in the Great Lakes and off the US coasts that had been salvaged, and in some cases ruined, by treasure hunters in the 1970s. Before the law's passage, "state governments used the Submerged Lands Act of 1953 to claim title to and control over abandoned shipwrecks on state submerged lands" which had not been successful.

On April 29, 1988, President Ronald Reagan signed the bill (Abandoned Shipwrecks Act of 1987, Pub. L. 100-298, 102 Stat. 432) into law.

== Provisions ==
The law is divided into six brief sections.

The first section explains Congress' need to pass the legislation. Congress found that "States have the responsibility for management of a broad range of living and nonliving resources in State waters and submerged lands; [] and included in the range of resources are certain abandoned shipwrecks, which have been deserted and to which the owner has relinquished ownership rights with no retention."

The second section defines key terms. The most important of these defined terms is embedded which states that it is:

"firmly affixed in the submerged lands or in coralline formations such that the use of tools of excavation is required in order to move the bottom sediments to gain access to the shipwreck, its cargo, and any part thereof."

Also, the term "submerged lands" refers to "lands beneath navigable waters", and "state" denotes "a state of the United States of America, District of Columbia, Puerto Rico, Guam, the Virgin Islands, American Samoa, and the Northern Mariana Islands."

However, the term abandoned is not defined in this section.

The third section leaves open the consideration of archaeologist, salvors, and the dive community for the continued access to shipwrecks that are determined to be claimed by state governments through the ASA. However, the law itself does not guarantee access to any of these groups for shipwrecks under the Act. The shipwrecks might be protected because they became biological reefs, tourist attractions, or were determined to be of historical value.

The fourth section provides for the preparation of guidelines and how they should be used by states to develop their own shipwreck management laws.

The fifth section is the most important. It defines the three ways for the federal government to claim ownership of a shipwreck: "The United States asserts title to any abandoned shipwreck that is— (1) embedded in submerged lands of a State; (2) embedded in coralline formations protected by a State on submerged lands of a State; or (3) on submerged lands of a State and is included in or determined eligible for inclusion in the National Register." While it is the federal government that initially claims ownership, it is automatically passed to the state in which the shipwreck is located.

The sixth and final section states that the ASA prevents the law of salvage or the law of finds on shipwrecks owned by the states through the legislation.

== Exclusions ==
The law does not protect military wrecks (which are always owned by the countries by which they were commissioned) or wrecks that lie on Native American land.

== Controversies ==
The act has led to dramatic courtroom battles because of terms used in the legislation that the drafters intentionally picked to be unambiguous, but, in fact, became the source of ambiguity. For example, the term abandoned has become a source of controversy as to what constitutes an "abandoned" shipwreck. A definition in the Act was thought to be redundant as the word had clear definition in the common law. Additionally, the termed embedded has likewise become contentious as there is no definitive answer as to how embedded is sufficient to constitute embedded for purposes of state ownership of a particular shipwreck.

Salvagers argue that the states need to prove to the public which wrecks are historic and are protected under the Act, while the states claim that the salvager needs to provide proof of ownership if they are to salvage any parts, sediment, artifacts, etc., of the wreck.
