= Taylor Grazing Act of 1934 =

United States federal law regarding public lands

- Long title: An Act to stop injury to the public grazing lands by preventing overgrazing and soil deterioration, to provide for their orderly use, improvement, and development, to stabilize the livestock industry dependent upon the public range, and for other purposes.
- Nicknames: Grazing Act of 1934
- Enacted by: the 73rd United States Congress
- Effective: June 28, 1934

Citations
- Public law: 73-482
- Statutes at Large: 48 Stat. 1269

Codification
- Titles amended: 43 U.S.C.: Public Lands
- U.S.C. sections created: 43 U.S.C. ch. 8A § 315 et seq.

Legislative history
- Introduced in the House as H.R. 6462 by Edward T. Taylor (D–CO) on March 10, 1934; Committee consideration by House Public Lands, Senate Public Lands and Surveys; Passed the House on April 11, 1934 (265-92); Passed the Senate on June 12, 1934 (Passed); Reported by the joint conference committee on June 15, 1934; agreed to by the House on June 15, 1934 (Agreed) and by the Senate on June 16, 1934 (Agreed); Signed into law by President Franklin D. Roosevelt on June 28, 1934

The Taylor Grazing Act of 1934 (TGA, Pub. L. 73–482) is a United States federal law that provides for the regulation of grazing on the public lands (excluding Alaska) to improve rangeland conditions and regulate their use.

The law initially permitted 80 million acres (32 million hectares) of previously unreserved public lands of the United States to be placed into grazing districts to be administered by the Department of the Interior. As amended, the law now sets no limit on the amount of lands in grazing districts. Currently, there are approximately 162 million acres (66 million ha) inside grazing allotments.

These can be vacant, unappropriated, and unreserved land from public lands, all except for Alaska, national forests, parks, monuments, Indian reservations, railroad grant lands, and revested Coos Bay Wagon Road grant lands. Surrounding landowners may be granted right of passage over these districts. Permits are given for grazing privileges in the districts. Also permits can be given to build fences, reservoirs, and other improvements.

The permittees are required to pay a fee, and the permit cannot exceed ten years but is renewable. Permits can be revoked because of severe drought or other natural disasters that deplete grazing lands.

== History ==
During the administration of President Herbert Hoover, it became clear that federal regulation of public land use was needed to address the root causes of the Dust Bowl. Since vast portions were used for livestock grazing, the importance of range management loomed large.

The advocacy of John Francis Deeds, chief of the Agricultural Division of the Geological Survey and deputy director of the Department's Grazing Division, was influential in bringing about the benefits of the Taylor Grazing Act.

Congressman Don B. Colton of Utah introduced a bill to create grazing districts, but the bill failed to pass the US Senate. In 1933, Edward T. Taylor, a representative from Colorado, reintroduced the Colton bill as the Taylor bill. This bill set up the grazing bureau, or service in the Department of Interior, to administer the range lands. The Grazing Service was merged with the United States General Land Office in 1946 to form the Bureau of Land Management.

Case studies by Phillip O. Foss on the role of local grazing advisory committees established by the Taylor Grazing Act in regulating the grazing of livestock on federal public lands found that such committees were often dominated by the same ranchers and cattlemen whose activities were supposed to be regulated, indicating that grazing regulation had been "captured" by the regulated interests.

A 2022 study found the law, which demarcated property rights, led to greater land productivity in large grazing districts in the Western US.

== Amendments to 1934 Act ==
U.S. Congressional amendments to the Grazing Act of 1934.

Date of Enactment	Public Law Number	U.S. Statute Citation	U.S. Legislative Bill	U.S. Presidential Administration
June 26, 1936	P.L. 74-827	49 Stat. 1976	H.R. 10094	Franklin D. Roosevelt
May 28, 1954	P.L. 83-375	68 Stat. 151	H.R. 6186	Dwight D. Eisenhower

== See also ==
- Range war
- Sheep Wars
