= Public Land Law Review Commission =

The Public Land Law Review Commission (PLLRC) was established on September 19, 1964 in order to review federal public land laws and regulations of the United States and to recommend a public land policy. The Commission met between 1965 and 1969.
