= Timber and Stone Act =

Timber and Stone Act of 1878
- Other short titles: Timber and Stone Act
- Long title: An Act for the sale of timber lands in the States of California, Oregon, Nevada, and in Washington Territory.
- Enacted by: the 45th United States Congress
- Effective: June 30, 1878

Citations
- Public law: Chapter 151
- Statutes at Large: 20 Stat. 89

Codification
- U.S.C. sections created: Former 43 U.S.C. ch. 8 (§§ 311–313)

Legislative history
- Introduced in the House as H.R. 1154 by D‑CA Romualdo Pachecoth on January 14, 1878; Committee consideration by House Committee on Public Lands; Passed the House on April 23, 1878 (Voice vote); Passed the Senate on May 28, 1878 (Voice vote); Reported by the joint conference committee on May 1978; agreed to by the House on May 29, 1878 (Voice vote (agreed to amendments)) and by the Senate on May 29, 1878 (Voice vote (agreed to amendments)); Signed into law by President Rutherford B. Hayes on June 3, 1878

Major amendments
- Act of August 4, 1892 (27 Stat. 348)

United States Supreme Court cases
- United States v. Budd (1892)

The Timber and Stone Act of 1878 in the United States sold timberland in surveyed public lands of the United States within the states of California, Oregon, and Nevada, and in the Washington Territory. The legislation specifically noted that military, Indian, or other reservations of the United States within these territories were exempt. The price of sale was $2.50 per acre ($618/km^{2}), and land was sold in 160 acre (0.6 km^{2}) blocks.

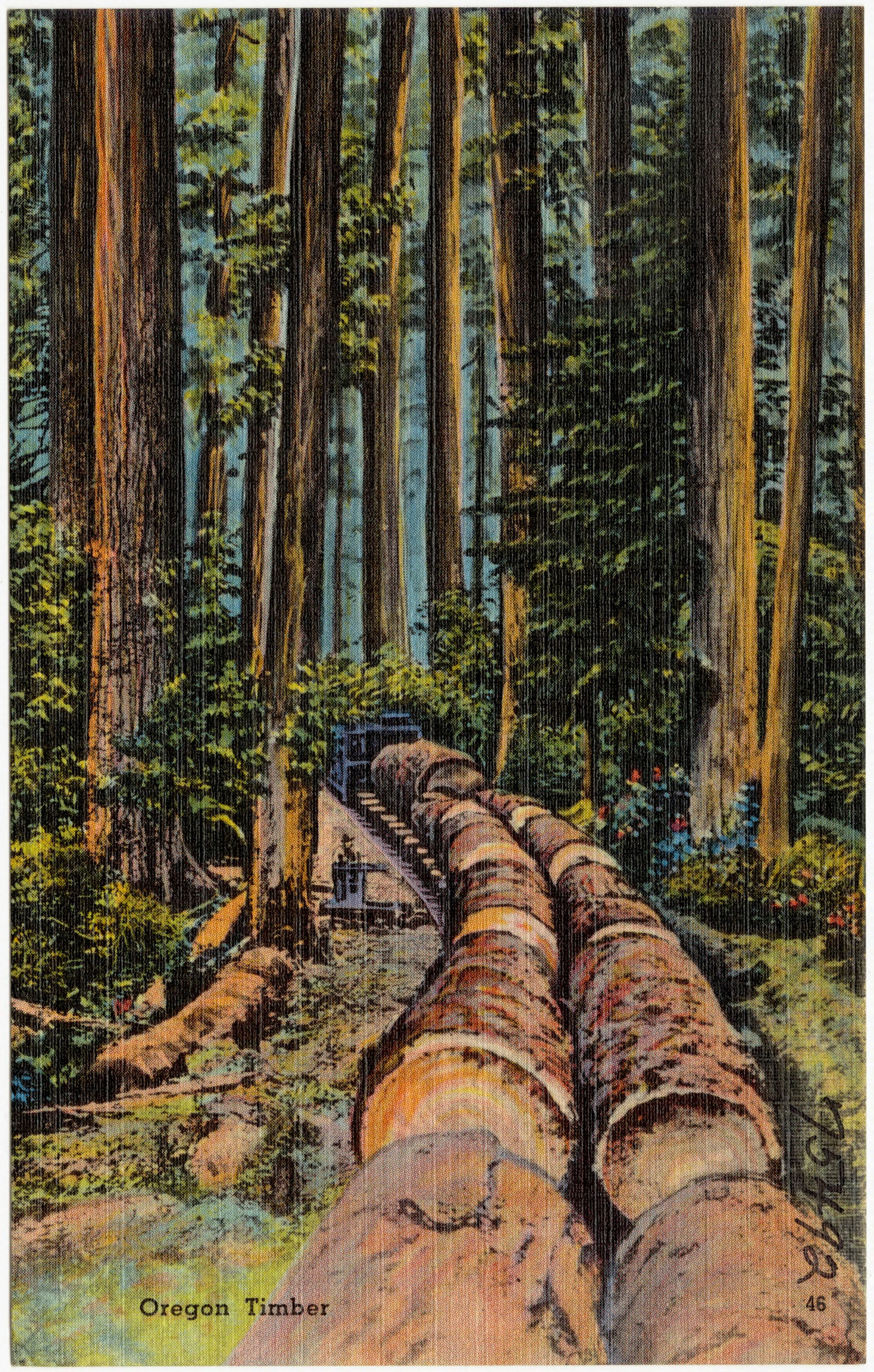

Land that was deemed "unfit for farming" was sold to any citizen of the United States, or any person intending to become a citizen who might want to "timber and stone" (logging and mining) upon the land. The act was used by speculators who were able to get great expanses declared "unfit for farming" allowing them to increase their land holdings at minimal expense.

In theory the purchaser was to make an affidavit that he was entering the land exclusively for his own use and that no association was to hold more than 160 acres (65 ha). In practice however, many wealthy companies and individuals seeking to access natural resources fraudulently circumvented the law by hiring individuals to purchase 160-acre (65 ha) lots that were then deeded to the company in direct violation of the law. In this way, more than 90 percent of the several million acres of timberland privatized under the Act in Washington, Oregon, Nevada and California were fraudulently compiled. Ultimately, said companies were able to obtain title on up to 100,000 acres (400 km^{2}). By the year 1923, twelve million acres of land had been transferred from the public domain to the private via this act.

== See also ==
- Desert Land Act
- Homestead Act
