= Desert Land Act =

1877 U.S. law

- Other short titles: Desert Land Act of 1877 · Act of March 3, 1877
- Long title: An Act to provide for the sale of desert lands in certain States and Territories.
- Enacted by: the 44th United States Congress
- Effective: March 3, 1877

Citations
- Public law: Chapter 107
- Statutes at Large: 19 Stat. 377

Codification
- Acts amended: Homestead Act of 1862
- U.S.C. sections created: 43 U.S.C. ch. 9 (§ 321 et seq.)

Legislative history
- Introduced in the Senate as S. 1159 by R‑CA Aaron A. Sargentth; Committee consideration by Senate Committee on Public Lands; Passed the Senate on (Voice vote); Passed the House on (Voice vote); Reported by the joint conference committee on March 1877; agreed to by the House on March 2, 1877 (Voice vote (agreed to conference report)) and by the Senate on March 2, 1877 (Voice vote (agreed to conference report)); Signed into law by President Ulysses S. Grant on March 3, 1877

Major amendments
- General Revision Act of 1891 (26 Stat. 1095)

United States Supreme Court cases
- California Oregon Power Co. v. Beaver Portland Cement Co. (1935)

The Desert Land Act is a United States federal law which was passed by the United States Congress on March 3, 1877, to encourage and promote the economic development of the arid and semiarid public lands within certain states of the Western states. Through the Act, United States citizens, or those declaring an intent to become a citizen, over the age of 21 may apply for a desert-land entry to irrigate and reclaim the land. This act amended the Homestead Act of 1862. Originally the act offered 640 acres (2.6 km^{2}), but that was subsequently limited to 320.

A precursor act in 1875, called the Lassen County Act, was pushed by Representative John K. Luttrell of the northeastern district of California, who wanted to speed up privatization of land east of the Sierra. This act enlarged the maximum allowable purchase for settlers from 160 acres to 640 acres. With the backing of Land Commissioner J. A. Williamson, Luttrell and Senator Aaron A. Sargent co-sponsored the Desert act which extended the Lassen County Act to cover several arid states and other regions of California.

== Intentions ==
The original intent of the Desert Land Act was to instigate growth in the West by incentivizing people to move out West in the late 19th century and develop irrigation systems that would transform the land into usable space. While it encouraged growth, it also played a large role in water rights of the era. While settlers decided to move West to spread irrigation, rather than use the land solely for farming or cattle, it created a new dilemma for settlers as to how to use and share the water, be it on a communal or an individual basis. While many irrigation systems were set up communally, that eventually led to private water companies that owned large irrigation systems, which were built independently without consulting proper engineers.

== Outcomes ==
Although the Desert Land Act was partly based on the Homestead Act and the Preemption Act (1841), it did not contain a key provision of those acts, the residence requirement. While the claimant had to improve the land, the claimant did not need to live on the land while the improvements were made. In the end, that led to a significant amount of fraud, and land speculation companies acquired tens of thousands of acres of California land by hiring "dummy entrymen" to make false claims of settlement.

Well known areas that began as land patented under the Desert Land Act include the Salt River in Arizona, the Imperial Valley in California, the Snake River in Idaho, Gallatin, Montana, and Yakima, Washington. Many of these communities facilitated further growth through the help of the Reclamation Act of 1902.

The peak of growth of these areas can be tracked by three separate eras prior to the current era: 1877–1887, 1888–1893, and 1893–1910.

=== 1877–1887 ===
The first decade after the Desert Land Act was passed was well known for fraudulent activity, especially by cattle producers. The era saw its end after a decline in the cattle industry.

=== 1888–1893 ===
The second era of the Desert Land Act saw a significant drop in fraudulent activity after an amendment to the Act that included stricter regulations and checks for irrigation systems, however was not entirely absent of fraudulent land ownership. The settlers were then required to submit maps and plans of irrigation to prevent violation of the act. Other amendatory acts to the law included encouraging communal placement of irrigation systems, and defined the progress of reclamation in the amount spent on the systems. The time period ended with the Panic of 1893.

=== 1893–1910 ===
The last era of the Desert Land Act began as the interest in irrigation and migration increased following the prosperity after the Depression of 1893. The last year of the era marks the peak of Desert Land Act original entries, over 15,000 in one year.

=== After 1910 ===
By 1920, nearly all present irrigation systems had been in place in all lands grown in the West from the act.

== See also ==
- Great American Desert
