= Federal Land Policy and Management Act of 1976 =

United States federal law governing public land management

- Long title: An Act to provide for the management, protection, and development of the national resource lands, and for other purposes; An Act to establish public land policy; to establish guidelines for its administration; to provide for the management, protection, development, and enhancement of the public lands; and for other purposes.
- Acronyms (colloquial): FLPMA
- Enacted by: the 94th United States Congress
- Effective: October 21, 1976

Citations
- Public law: 94-579
- Statutes at Large: 90 Stat. 2743

Codification
- Acts repealed: Stock-Raising Homestead Act
- Titles amended: 43 U.S.C.: Public Lands
- U.S.C. sections created: 43 U.S.C. ch. 35 § 1701 et seq.

Legislative history
- Introduced in the Senate as S. 507 by Floyd K. Haskell (D–CO) on January 30, 1975; Committee consideration by House Natural Resources, Senate Energy and Natural Resources; Passed the Senate on February 25, 1976 (78-11); Passed the House on July 22, 1976 (169-155, in lieu of H.R. 13777); Signed into law by President Gerald Ford on October 21, 1976

The Federal Land Policy and Management Act (FLPMA) is a United States federal law that governs the way in which the public lands administered by the Bureau of Land Management are managed. The law was enacted in 1976 by the 94th Congress and is found in the United States Code under Title 43. The Federal Land Policy and Management Act phased out homesteading in the United States by repealing the pre-existing Homestead Acts.

== Background ==
Multiple factors led to the passing of the Federal Land Policy Management Act of 1976. Public opinion and attitude towards natural land had shifted, with more people wanting to preserve and protect federal lands. The public influenced representatives in the House of Representatives and the Senate to create an act that would change how federal lands were overseen, transitioning from little management to intense land management. The work of the Public Land Law Review Commission and the commission's findings have been given credit for introducing ideas that would eventually lead to FLPMA. The Public Land Law Review Commission reviewed legislation regarding federal land, deducing which laws were outdated, unnecessary, and needed to be revised. The numerous laws that the Public Land Law Review Commission found to be inefficient combined with the public's desire for better federal land management motivated the United States Congress to pass the FLPMA.

== Overview of the Federal Land Policy and Management Act ==
The FLPMA changed the way that the federal government managed lands and the resources on those lands by providing the Bureau of Land Management more control over the acquisition and disposal of land and by creating a detailed plan that analyzed the environmental concerns of federal land. The act greatly increased the power of the Bureau of Land Management in the Department of the Interior to acquire and dispose of federal land. The FLPMA required a plan to be created for land to determine the environmental value of that land and if it could be designated for public use. The plan would detail the environmental concerns of the land, requiring that three factors be upheld:

1. The land must be managed in a way that protects the integrity of the natural resources and cultural or historical artifacts found on the land.
2. Segments of the land that were deemed to be in danger or vital had to be protected.
3. Any sections of the land that had environmental significance be established.

The Bureau of Land Management had to follow these requirements when making any decisions regarding the management of federal land that was intended for public use.

Congress recognized the value of the public lands, declaring that these lands would remain in public ownership. The National Forest Service, National Park Service, and now, the Bureau of Land Management, are commissioned in FLPMA to allow a variety of uses on their land (of greater concern for the BLM, who is the least restrictive in terms of uses) while simultaneously trying to preserve the natural resources in them. This concept is best summarized by the term 'multiple-use.' 'Multiple use' is defined in the Act as "management of the public lands and their various resource values so that they are utilized in the combination that will best meet the present and future needs of the American people." FLPMA addresses topics such as land-use planning, land acquisition, fees and payments, administration of federal land, range management, and right-of-ways on federal land. FLPMA has specific objectives and time frames in which to accomplish these objectives, giving it more authority and eliminating the uncertainty surrounding the BLM's role in wilderness designation and management.

Parts of FLPMA relating specifically to Wilderness are found in Subchapter VI Designated Management Areas (§§ 1781 to 1787) under 43 U.S. Code § 1782 - Bureau of Land Management Wilderness Study. Here, the BLM is also given a mandate to recommend areas for designation as Wilderness and are given 15 years to do so. The BLM is to conduct studies, classifying areas as Wilderness Study Areas. These areas are not official Wilderness areas but are, for all intents and purposes, treated as such until formally designated as Wilderness or released by Congress. Approximately 8.8 million acres of BLM wilderness are currently included in the National Wilderness Preservation System as a result of the wilderness reviews mandated by FLPMA. Those ordered to implement policies from FLPMA are trained government employees using guidelines expressly stated within the act itself.
