= Title 43 of the United States Code =

U.S. federal statutes on public lands

Title 43 of the United States Code outlines the role of Public Lands in the United States Code.

- 43 U.S.C. ch. 1—Bureau of Land Management
- 43 U.S.C. ch. 2—United States Geological Survey
- 43 U.S.C. ch. 3—Surveys
- 43 U.S.C. ch. 4—District Land Offices
- 43 U.S.C. ch. 5—Land Districts
- 43 U.S.C. ch. 6—Withdrawal From Settlement, Location, Sale, or Entry
- 43 U.S.C. ch. 7—Homesteads
- 43 U.S.C. ch. 8—Timber and Stone Lands
- 43 U.S.C. ch. 8A—Grazing Lands
- 43 U.S.C. ch. 9—Desert-Land Entries
- 43 U.S.C. ch. 10—Underground-Water Reclamation Grants
- 43 U.S.C. ch. 11—Discovery, Development, And Marking Of Water Holes, Etc., By Government
- 43 U.S.C. ch. 11A—Board on Geographic Names
- 43 U.S.C. ch. 12—Reclamation and Irrigation of Lands by Federal Government
- 43 U.S.C. ch. 12A—Boulder Canyon Project
- 43 U.S.C. ch. 12B—Colorado River Storage Project
- 43 U.S.C. ch. 13—Federal Lands Included in State Irrigation Districts
- 43 U.S.C. ch. 14—Grants of Desert Lands to States for Reclamation
- 43 U.S.C. ch. 15—Appropriation of Waters; Reservoir Sites
- 43 U.S.C. ch. 16—Sale and Disposal of Public Lands
- 43 U.S.C. ch. 17—Reservation and Sale of Town Sites on Public Lands
- 43 U.S.C. ch. 18—Survey of Public Lands
- 43 U.S.C. ch. 19—Bounty Lands
- 43 U.S.C. ch. 20—Reservations and Grants to States for Public Purposes
- 43 U.S.C. ch. 21—Grants in Aid of Railroads and Wagon Roads
- 43 U.S.C. ch. 21A—Forfeiture Of Northern Pacific Railroad Indemnity Land Grants
- 43 U.S.C. ch. 22—Rights-Of-Way And Other Easements In Public Lands
- 43 U.S.C. ch. 23—Grants of Swamp and Overflowed Lands
- 43 U.S.C. ch. 24—Drainage Under State Laws
- 43 U.S.C. ch. 25—Unlawful Inclosures Or Occupancy; Obstructing Settlement Or Transit
- 43 U.S.C. ch. 25A—Lands Held Under Color of Title
- 43 U.S.C. ch. 26—Abandoned Military Reservations
- 43 U.S.C. ch. 27—Public Lands in Oklahoma
- 43 U.S.C. ch. 28—Miscellaneous Provisions Relating To Public Lands
- 43 U.S.C. ch. 29—Submerged Lands
- 43 U.S.C. ch. 30—Administration of Public Lands
- 43 U.S.C. ch. 31—Department of the Interior
- 43 U.S.C. ch. 32—Colorado River Basin Project
- 43 U.S.C. ch. 32A—Colorado River Basin Salinity Control
- 43 U.S.C. ch. 32B—Colorado River Floodway
- 43 U.S.C. ch. 33—Alaska Native Claims Settlement
- 43 U.S.C. ch. 33A—Implementation of Alaska Native Claims Settlement and Alaska Statehood
- 43 U.S.C. ch. 34—Trans-Alaska Pipeline
- 43 U.S.C. ch. 35—Federal Land Policy and Management
- 43 U.S.C. ch. 36—Outer Continental Shelf Resource Management
- 43 U.S.C. ch. 37—Public Rangelands Improvement
- 43 U.S.C. ch. 38—Crude Oil Transportation Systems
- 43 U.S.C. ch. 39—Abandoned Shipwrecks
- 43 U.S.C. ch. 40—Reclamation States Emergency Drought Relief
- 43 U.S.C. ch. 41—Federal Land Transaction Facilitation
