= Mineral Leasing Act of 1920 =

United States federal law

- Long title: An Act to promote the mining of coal, phosphate, oil, oil shale, gas, and sodium on the public domain.
- Enacted by: the 66th United States Congress
- Effective: February 25, 1920

Citations
- Public law: Pub. L. 66–146
- Statutes at Large: 41 Stat. 437

Codification
- Titles amended: 30 U.S.C.: Mineral Lands and Mining
- U.S.C. sections created: 30 U.S.C. ch. 3A § 181 et seq.

Legislative history
- Introduced in the Senate as S. 2775 by Reed Smoot (R–UT) on August 15, 1919; Committee consideration by Senate Public Lands, House Rules; Passed the Senate on September 3, 1919 (Passed); Passed the House on October 30, 1919 (Passed); Reported by the joint conference committee on November 1, 1919; agreed to by the House on February 10, 1920 (287-13) and by the Senate on February 11, 1920 (Agreed); Signed into law by President Woodrow Wilson on February 25, 1920

United States Supreme Court cases
- Wilbur v. United States Ex Rel. Krushnic, 280 U.S. 306 (1930); Ickes v. Virginia-Colorado Development Corp., 295 U.S. 639 (1935); Boesche v. Udall, 373 U.S. 472 (1963); Wallis v. Pan American Petroleum Corp., 384 U.S. 63 (1966); Alyeska Pipeline Service Co. v. Wilderness Society, 421 U.S. 240 (1975); Andrus v. Shell Oil Co., 446 U.S. 657 (1980); Watt v. Alaska, 451 U.S. 259 (1981); United States Forest Service v. Cowpasture River Preservation Assn., No. 18-1584, 590 U.S. ___ (2020)

The Mineral Leasing Act of 1920 30 U.S.C. § 181 et seq. is a United States federal law that authorizes and governs leasing of public lands for developing deposits of coal, petroleum, natural gas and other hydrocarbons, in addition to phosphates, sodium, sulfur, and potassium in the United States. Previous to the act, these materials were subject to mining claims under the General Mining Act of 1872.

== Background ==
Previous to the Mineral Leasing Act of 1920, the General Mining Act of 1872 authorized citizens to freely prospect for minerals on public lands and allowed a discoverer to stake claims to both minerals and surrounding lands for development. This open-access policy enabled a major oil rush in the West, in 1909 prompting U.S. Geological Survey Director George Otis Smith to warn Secretary of the Interior Richard A. Ballinger that oil lands were being claimed so quickly they would be unavailable within a few months. Ballinger notified President Taft who promptly created the first American oil reserve by executive order on September 27, 1909, withdrawing 3,041,000 acres (12,310 km^{2}) of public lands in California and Wyoming from further claims, and reserving the oil for use by the United States Navy. Congress ratified the president's authority to set aside federally owned lands with the passing of the Pickett Act (36 Stat. 847) in 1910. The Supreme Court further affirmed the president's constitutional power to withdraw public land from use in United States v. Midwest Oil Co., 236 U.S. 459 (1915).. Following these events, Congress enacted the Mineral Leasing Act of 1920 which dictated a system of leasing and development for mining interests on federally owned lands.

== Mineral Leasing Act of 1920 ==
Provisions in the act provide a number of functions:

- Enables entrance onto public lands to explore for minerals with permission of the government.
- Enables drilling and extraction of minerals with authority granted by the government.
- Enables the government to manage the exploitation of leasable minerals.
- Enables the government to receive compensation from the lessee for the privilege of extracting minerals on federal public lands.

The Bureau of Land Management (BLM), a division of the Department of the Interior (DOI), is the principal administrator of the Mineral Leasing Act. BLM evaluates areas for potential development and awards leases based on whoever pays the highest bonus during a competitive bidding period.

== Leasing ==
The Mineral Leasing Act "establishes qualifications for leases, sets out maximum limits on the number of acres of a particular mineral that can be held by a lessee, and prohibits alien ownership of leases except through stock ownership in a corporation." Conditions of a lease under the Mineral Leasing Act vary based on the type of mineral being extracted. Phosphate and potassium leases have terms and conditions subject to readjustment at the end of each 20-year period. Sodium and sulphur lessee's have the right to renew the lease terms at the end of the first 20-year period and every 10-year period after that. Coal and oil shale leases are generally for 20 year periods, while oil and natural gas leases are generally for 10 year periods.

== Royalties ==
Royalties are payments made from one party to another based on usage of an asset, often in the form of a percentage. The Mineral Leasing Act required monetary gains from the leasing of public lands to be divided three ways, except for Alaska:

- 50 percent of gross revenues to state where the drilling takes place
- 40 percent of gross revenues to Reclamation Fund
- 10 percent of gross revenues to Federal Treasury.

In Alaska, 90 percent of the revenue goes to the state and 10 percent goes to the Federal Treasury.

== Petroleum ==
Under the Mineral Leasing Act and later amendments, the right to produce federally owned petroleum (oil and natural gas) is secured for ten-year periods by competitive bidding, and goes to the party paying the highest bonus. There are three forms of payment to the government: bonus (an initial payment to the government), rental (an annual payment of $2 per acre), and royalty ( a payment of 1/8 or 12.5% of the gross value of the oil and gas produced).

== Coal ==
Under the Mineral Leasing Act as amended and the Mineral Leasing Act for Acquired Lands of 1947 as amended, coal leases are initially obtained for a 20-year period but can be terminated in 10 years if the resources are not sufficiently developed. As with petroleum, an initial bonus must be paid to the government at the time the lease is awarded. Annual rental fees for coal are $3 per acre. Royalties are 12.5% of the gross value for surface mined coal and 8% for coal produced from underground mines.
