= Public land =

Land owned by a national, subnational, or local government

In all modern states, a portion of land is held by central or local governments. This is called public land, state land, or Crown land (Commonwealth realms). The system of tenure of public land, and the terminology used, varies between countries. The following examples illustrate some of the range.

== Commonwealth realms ==
In several Commonwealth realms such as Australia, New Zealand and Canada, public lands are referred to as Crown lands. Recent proposals to sell Crown lands have been highly controversial.

== France ==
In France, (French: domaine public) may be held by communes, départements, or the central State.

== Portugal ==
In Portugal the land owned by the State, by the two autonomous regions (Azores and Madeira) and by the local governments (municipalities (Portuguese: municípios) and freguesias) can be of two types: public domain (Portuguese: domínio público) and private domain (Portuguese: domínio privado). The latter is owned like any private entity (and may be sold), while public domain land cannot be sold and it is expected to be used by the public (although it can be leased to private entities for up to 75 years in certain cases). Examples of public domain land are the margins of the sea and of the rivers, roads, streets, railways, ports, military areas, monuments. The State's private domain is managed by Direção-Geral do Tesouro e Finanças and the State's public domain is managed by various entities (state companies and state institutes, such as the Portuguese Environment Agency, Infraestruturas de Portugal, Administração do Porto de Lisboa S.A., etc.).

== West Bank ==
Public lands on the West Bank of Palestine are in part based on the Ottoman Empire law specifying that land not worked for over ten years becomes "state lands".

== United States ==
Map of all federally owned land in the United States.

Most of the public land managed by the US Forest Service and Bureau of Land Management is in the Western states. Public lands account for 25 to 75 percent of the total land area in these states.

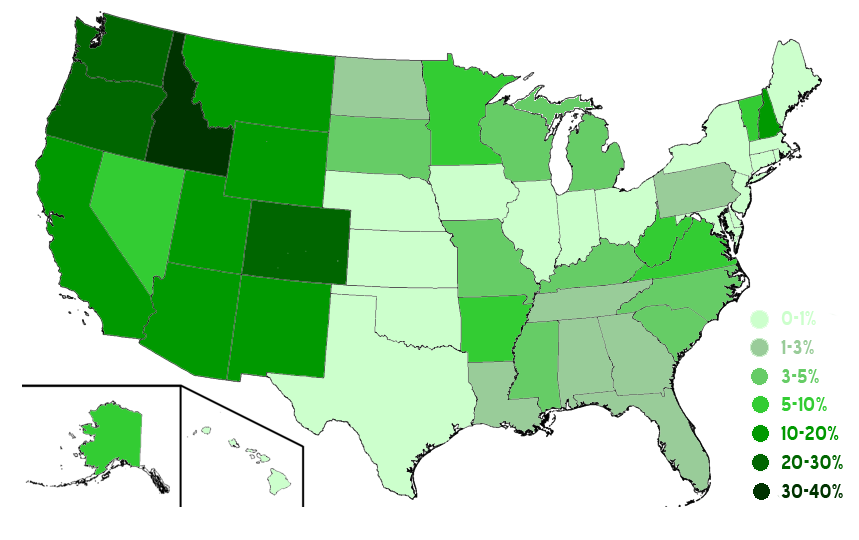
The US Forest Service alone manages 193 million acres (780,000 km²) nationwide, or roughly 8% of the total land area in the United States.

In the United States, governmental entities at all levels- including townships, cities, counties, states, and the federal government- all manage land which are referred to as either public lands or the public domain.

The majority of public lands in the United States are held in trust for the American people by the federal government and managed by the Bureau of Land Management (BLM), the United States National Park Service, the Bureau of Reclamation, or the Fish and Wildlife Service under the Department of the Interior, or by the United States Forest Service under the Department of Agriculture. Other federal agencies that manage public lands include the National Oceanic and Atmospheric Administration and the United States Department of Defense, which includes the U.S. Army Corps of Engineers.

In general, Congress must legislate the creation or acquisition of new public lands, such as national parks; however, under the 1906 Antiquities Act, also known as the National Monuments Act, the President may designate new national monuments without congressional authorization if the monument is on federally-owned land.

Each western state also received federal "public land" as trust lands designated for specific beneficiaries, which the States are to manage as a condition to acceptance into the union. Those trust lands cannot any longer be considered public lands as allowing any benefits to the "public" would be in breach of loyalty to the specific beneficiaries. The trust lands (two sections, or about 1,280 acres (5.2 km^{2}) per township) are usually managed extractively (grazing or mining), to provide revenue for public schools. All states have some lands under state management, such as state parks, state wildlife management areas, and state forests.

Wilderness is a special designation for public lands which have been completely undeveloped. The concept of wilderness areas was legislatively defined by the 1964 Wilderness Act. Wilderness areas can be managed by any of the above Federal agencies, and some parks and refuges are almost entirely designated wilderness. A wilderness study area is a tract of land that has wilderness characteristics, and is managed as wilderness, but has not received a wilderness designation from Congress.

Typically each parcel is governed by its own set of laws and rules that explain the purpose for which the land was acquired, and how the land may be used.

=== History ===
The concept of a formal designation and conservation of public lands dates back to the first National Parks. While designating the parks as public, the conservation was another matter. Theodore Roosevelt and his conservation group, Boone and Crockett Club created laws and regulations that protected public land. Roosevelt and the Boone and Crockett Club continued on influencing the creation of large amounts of public lands including the National Refuge System, USFS and the United States National Forest system.

=== Recreation on U.S. public lands ===
Most state- and federally managed public lands are open for recreational use. Recreation opportunities depend on the managing agency, and run the gamut from the less restrictive, undeveloped wide open spaces of BLM lands to the highly developed and controlled national and state parks. Wildlife refuges and state wildlife management areas, managed primarily to improve habitat, are generally open to wildlife watching, hiking, and hunting, except for closures to protect mating and nesting, or to reduce stress on wintering animals. National forests generally have a mix of maintained trails and roads, wilderness and undeveloped portions, and developed picnic and camping areas.

=== Grazing on U.S. public lands ===
Historically in western United States, much public land is leased for grazing by cattle or sheep (most National Park Service areas are closed to livestock grazing). This includes vast tracts of National Forest and BLM land, as well as land on some Wildlife Refuges. National Parks are the exception. This use became controversial in the late 20th century as it was examined by environmentalists and scientists concerned about the impact of these exotic animals on native plant populations and watersheds.

=== Oil and gas drilling and mining on U.S. public lands ===
Large tracts of public land in the United States are available for leasing for petroleum or mineral production. Lands which have a high likelihood of producing valuable resources can, as of 2018, command prices as high as $80,000 an acre per year. Large tracts of other lands, where the likelihood of the presence or successful exploitation of resources are very low, could be leased, as of 2018, for as low as $1.50 an acre per year. The Trump administration greatly expanded mineral leasing resulting in a substantial increase in fracking in likely locations in Wyoming and New Mexico, but a great deal of land where prospects for successful production were limited was leased at very low rates to speculators.

== See also ==
- Acquired lands
- Ager publicus
- Federal enclave
- Freedom to roam § Government-owned land
- National Public Lands Day (in the US)
- Public domain
- State ownership
- United States territorial acquisitions
- Common land
