= Landman (TV series) =

American drama television series by Taylor Sheridan and Christian Wallace

- Genre: Drama; Neo-Western
- Created by: Taylor Sheridan; Christian Wallace
- Based on: Boomtown by: Imperative Entertainment; Texas Monthly
- Written by: Taylor Sheridan
- Starring: Billy Bob Thornton; Ali Larter; Jacob Lofland; Michelle Randolph; Paulina Chávez; Kayla Wallace; Mark Collie; James Jordan; Demi Moore; Jon Hamm; Andy Garcia; Sam Elliott
- Music by: Andrew Lockington
- Country of origin: United States
- Original language: English
- No. of seasons: 2
- No. of episodes: 20

Production
- Executive producers: Christian Wallace; Taylor Sheridan; David C. Glasser; David Hutkin; Ronald Burkle; Bob Yari; Geyer Kosinski; Dan Friedkin; Jason Hoch; Scott Brown; Megan Creydt; Peter Feldman; Michael Friedman; Stephen Kay; J.K. Nickell
- Production companies: Imperative Entertainment; Texas Monthly; Bosque Ranch Productions; 101 Studios; Paramount Television Studios (Note: Known as MTV Entertainment Studios for season 1)

Original release
- Network: Paramount+
- Release: November 17, 2024 – present

Landman is an American drama series created by Taylor Sheridan and Christian Wallace, inspired by the podcast series Boomtown hosted by Wallace. Starring Billy Bob Thornton as a landman for an oil company, the show premiered on November 17, 2024, on Paramount+. In March 2025, the series was renewed for a second season, which premiered on November 16, 2025. In December 2025, the series was renewed for a third season. Despite some elements igniting controversy, the series has been received positively by critics overall.

== Synopsis ==
Landman is set within the world of oilfields in West Texas, where "roughnecks and wildcat billionaires are fueling a boom so big it is reshaping our climate, our economy, and our geopolitics." The lead character, Tommy Norris, can be abrasive, as is the out-of-town lawyer, Rebecca Falcone, who is investigating a fatal accident, early in season one.

== Cast ==
=== Main ===
- Billy Bob Thornton as Tommy Norris, a combination of a petroleum landman and an operations VP at M-Tex Oil, later President
- Ali Larter as Angela Norris, Tommy's ex-wife and Cooper and Ainsley's mother
- Jacob Lofland as Cooper Norris, Tommy and Angela's son and Ainsley's brother, a former petroleum geology student who dropped out of Texas Tech
- Michelle Randolph as Ainsley Norris, Tommy and Angela's daughter and Cooper's sister, high school cheerleader
- Paulina Chávez as Ariana Medina, Elvio's widowed wife and Cooper's love interest
- Kayla Wallace as Rebecca Falcone, a causation lawyer at Shepherd-Hastings and later in-house counsel for M-Tex Oil to work for M-Tex as a roustabout
- Mark Collie as Walt Joeberg, the Sheriff of Midland County
- James Jordan as Dale Bradley, a petroleum engineer
- Demi Moore as Cami Miller, Monty's wife and later the owner of M-Tex Oil
- Jon Hamm as Monty Miller (season 1), the owner of M-Tex with a long personal and professional relationship with Tommy
- Andy Garcia as Danny "Gallino" Morrell (season 2—present; guest season 1), the Cuban American head of the international Gallino drug cartel who presents publicly as a legitimate financial investor
- Sam Elliott as Thomas "T. L." Norris (season 2—present), Tommy's father
- Michael Kelly as William Crockett, (season 3), the leader of the largest oil management firm in the world
- Colm Feore as Nathan, an M-Tex Oil attorney and administrator (season 3, recurring seasons 1—2)
- Mustafa Speaks as Theodore "Boss" Ramone (season 3, recurring seasons 1—2), the lead oil crewman on Cooper's second crew
- Francesca Xuereb as Cheyenne (season 3, recurring season 2), a stripper turned physical therapist Tommy hires to help TL
- Bobbi Salvör Menuez as Paigyn Meester (season 3, guest season 2), Ainsley's non-binary almost roommate at TCU

=== Recurring ===
- Alex Meraz as Jimenez (season 1), lieutenant of the local Midland drug network, part of the international Gallino drug cartel
- Caleb Martin as Ben "BR" Reynolds (season 2), a member of Boss's second season crew
- Dougie Hall as Russ "King" Fisher (season 2), a Comanche member of Boss's second season crew
- K.C. Clyde as Barney (season 2, guest in season 1), head bartender at The Patch Cafe
- Stefania Spampinato as Bella Morrell (season 2), Gallino's Italian wife
- Guy Burnet as Charles "Charlie" Newsom (season 2), a British geologist who falls in love with Rebecca

=== Guest ===
- Michael Peña as Armando Medina, a lead oil crewman who is training Cooper
- Brook Still as Abilene, a barista at drive through
- Emilio Rivera as Luis Medina, an oil crewman, and Armando's and Elvio's uncle
- Alejandro Akara as Elvio Medina, an oil crewman, Ariana's deceased husband, Luis's nephew, and Armando's younger brother
- Robyn Lively as Ellie, a waitress at the Patch Cafe
- Bart Johnson as Patrick Ramsey, a representative of one of M-Tex Oil's partners
- Octavio Rodriguez as Antonio, a member of Boss's oil crew and a cousin of Armando, Luis, and Elvio
- J. R. Villarreal as Manuel Lopez, another member of Boss's oil crew and cousin of Armando, Luis, and Elvio
- Colin Ferguson as Bob Knowles, president of a competing oil company
- Audrey McGraw as Shelby, the teen neighbor who befriends Ainsley
- Mitchell Slaggert as Ryder Sampson, Ainsley's second boyfriend
- Deidra Shanell as Margaret, senior citizen home nurse
- Marco Perella as Hank, a resident in a senior citizen home
- Gail Cronauer as Beverly, a resident in a senior citizen home
- Maxwell Caulfield as the Governor of Texas
- Ben Browder as Ivey, a Colonel in the Texas National Guard
- Jerry Jones as a fictional version of himself
- Tim DeZarn as Perry Hardin, a small parcel landholder with a dry oil well on his property
- Matt Peters as Mel, the manager of a Rick's Cabaret in Midland
- Michael Tow as Dr. Michaels, Monty's cardiac surgeon
- Jim Meskimen as Alan Thomas, Monty's personal lawyer
- Miriam Silverman as Greta Stidham, TCU admission officer
- Bradley Snedeker as Robert James, lawyer for a company that insured a damaged gas extraction platform in the Gulf
- Christopher Stanley as Eric McDougal, lawyer for a company that insured a damaged gas extraction platform in the Gulf
- Mackenzie Astin as Detective Hayes, Odessa Police Department
- Wolé Parks as Detective Miller, Odessa Police Department
- Shannon Thornton as Brit Sterling, TCU cheerleader coach

== Episodes ==
=== Series overview ===
Season	Episodes	Originally released	
Season	Episodes	First released	Last released
1	10	November 17, 2024	January 12, 2025
2	10	November 16, 2025	January 18, 2026

=== Season 1 (2024–25) ===
No. overall	No. in season	Title	Directed by	Written by	Original release date
1	1	"Landman"	Taylor Sheridan	Taylor Sheridan	November 17, 2024
Tommy Norris, a landman, negotiates with a Mexican cartel on behalf of M-Tex oil company to lease a large West Texas oil field. Six months later, a drug drop on a deserted company-owned road ends disastrously when an oil hauler from a rival company barrels through the scene, killing everyone. Tommy is sent to investigate. The situation is critical because a stolen M-Tex plane was involved and Sheriff Joeberg complains that the police were not alerted. Norris arranges for Joeberg to acknowledge in his report to reflect that the plane theft had been notified to appropriate authority. Meanwhile, Norris' son Cooper starts his first day with M-Tex, working in the same oil field that Norris directs. Cooper endures rough hazing from his assigned crew, but they ease up after a prank injures him. It is revealed that Norris asked the oldest crew member to look after Cooper. Meanwhile, Norris' ex-wife, Angela, calls informing him that their teenage daughter, Ainsley, whom she does not trust to be on her own, will stay with him during her vacation with her husband. Ainsley arrives with her high school boyfriend. She tells Tommy she is applying to the University of Alabama which her boyfriend plans to attend. The boyfriend does not reciprocate Ainsley's deeper feelings, leaving her heartbroken. The next morning, Cooper's crew is sent to work on a decrepit pumpjack, but the job ends disastrously when a leaky valve explodes. Meanwhile, a despondent Ainsley disrupts the shared household.
2	2	"Dreamers and Losers"	Taylor Sheridan	Taylor Sheridan	November 17, 2024
Cooper survives a wellhead explosion that kills his entire crew. Before becoming an oil field roughneck, Cooper dropped out of Texas Tech just three months short of receiving his bachelor's degree in petroleum geology. Tommy loses part of a finger while closing a stuck valve that is fueling the resulting fire and prevents a larger disaster. The employees' deaths create more liability issues for the company and problems for Tommy and Monty Miller, the M-Tex owner. Ainsley's continuing presence disrupts the all-male housemates' daily routines within the company-owned employee residence.
3	3	"Hell Has a Front Yard"	Stephen Kay	Taylor Sheridan	November 24, 2024
Angela shortens her vacation and flies into Midland to support heart-broken Ainsley. Meanwhile, Cooper is attacked at the petroleum workers camp by his first crew's cousins. Cooper disarms them with wrestling moves while impressing Boss, the leader of his potential second crew. Nathan warns Tommy that the company might try to pin liability for the accident on him. Tommy takes causation lawyer, Rebecca Falcone, to where the petroleum hauler collided with the stolen airplane that had landed to transfer illegal drugs to a van. Cooper attends the wake for his fallen crew and meets Elvio's widow, Ariana. On Cooper's first day on Boss's crew, which includes the cousins he fought the day before, he helps rework an uneconomical stripper well without injuring himself or his new crew. A drunk Angela cheats on her husband, Victor, by seducing Tommy.
4	4	"The Sting of Second Chances"	Stephen Kay	Taylor Sheridan	December 1, 2024
Rebecca crushes her legal opponents at a deposition in which lawyers for TTP and their insurance company attempt to place all blame for their speeding oil tanker's destruction and the employee's death on M-Tex. Back at the wellhead, Boss's crew continue to remove old pipe from the wellhead when Antonio injures his hand and is taken to the hospital, leaving Cooper to fill in. Monty's gamble pays off and the reworked well is producing 20-times better than before and twice the amount as when it was installed 35 years ago. Angela and Tommy reconcile. Faced with mounting bills, Ariana calls Cooper for help.
5	5	"Where Is Home"	Stephen Kay	Taylor Sheridan	December 8, 2024
Tommy, Dale, and Boss inspect another under-performing well. Cooper goes to Ariana's house to help with her finances and later does yard work. However, Cooper mowing the front lawn angers Manuel, who is Ariana's late husband's cousin. Rebecca meets with Nate to strategize on minimizing the settlements with the widows of Cooper's first crew. Ainsley meets teenage neighbor Shelby and is invited to a wild party. Angela redecorates the entire house at her current husband's expense. While inspecting wells, Tommy, Dale, and Boss are visited by the Mexican cartel, who try to shake down Tommy for the value of the drugs lost in the airplane explosion. Angela's first family dinner begins with much tension. Cooper gets beaten up by Manuel, Antonio, and other male relatives when he returns to his room at the man camp. Angela hitches a ride with Tommy on the long drive to Fort Worth to meet her soon-to-be-ex-husband Victor, while Tommy talks with Monty. Before leaving the Permian Basin, Tommy gets diverted to an oil field just as a man is fatally crushed by drilling pipes.
6	6	"Beware the Second Beating"	Michael Friedman	Taylor Sheridan	December 15, 2024
Tommy informs Monty about the legal and technical problems in the Permian Basin, especially with the drug cartel. Lawyers Nate and Rebecca meet with the three Medina widows to offer a minimal settlement. Angela returns to her second husband's home in Fort Worth and is met by his lawyers who present her with divorce papers. An injured Cooper is discovered in his trailer and airlifted to the hospital. An enraged Tommy gives Manuel and Antonio a beating before firing them and handing them to the sheriff.
7	7	"All Roads Lead to a Hole"	Michael Friedman	Taylor Sheridan	December 22, 2024
After being released from the hospital, Cooper moves into Ariana's home. Monty makes a deal with a cash-strapped competitor which could make him much money or lose everything on the gamble. While riding with her mother, Ainsley spots an old age home; Angela decides to show Ainsley how society treats the poorer elderly. After seeing conditions at the elderly home, Angela decides to liven things up with alcohol and board games. When the drug cartel visit a well site being reconditioned to increase production, Tommy is prepared with well-armed extraction crew members. Ainsley goes with Shelby to an alcohol-fueled teen party where she meets local high school quarterback Ryder Sampson.
8	8	"Clumsy, This Life"	Stephen Kay	Taylor Sheridan	December 29, 2024
Monty meets with his old friend, the Texas governor, for breakfast at the exclusive members-only Austin Club in Austin. Monty convinces the governor to have Texas Army National Guard units conduct live fire training maneuvers in areas where the drug cartel are interfering with routine petroleum extraction operations. Rebecca tries to intimidate Ariana and Cooper to force Ariana to accept the initial minimal offer. However, Cooper convinces Nate, and later Monty, that his counteroffer is cheaper than going to trial, which could expose M-Tex to greater public scrutiny and large fines for an unsafe work environment. The additional stress of the Medina widows settlement causes Monty's blood pressure to spike leading to a heart attack. Rebecca tries to retaliate against Cooper through Tommy, but Tommy refuses. Tommy meets with Colonel Ivey of the National Guard which gets helicopters from the 35th Combat Aviation Brigade to train at the oil fields. One of the helicopters accidentally kills a group of cartel members conducting a drug shipment transfer.
9	9	"WolfCamp"	Stephen Kay	Taylor Sheridan	January 5, 2025
Tommy visits Monty at a Fort Worth hospital. Monty, considering his mortality, makes Tommy vice president for production. Colonel Ivey calls Tommy, informing him of the drug couriers' deaths. He tells the National Guard to leave and allow the drug cartel to clean up the mess. Tommy calls the drug cartel and is informed that the cartel's surveillance network is aware of Tommy's and Monty's every movement throughout the state of Texas. After quitting M-Tex, Cooper starts analyzing the geological survey and oil lease maps of West Texas, then starts buying leases from small parcel owners whose shallow oil wells have dried up. Monty suffers another heart attack. Tommy witnesses a coyote being shot and killed near his backyard, possibly foreshadowing future events.
10	10	"The Crumbs of Hope"	Stephen Kay	Taylor Sheridan	January 12, 2025
Monty undergoes emergency open heart surgery. Tommy and Cami meet with Monty's personal lawyer who says Monty's will makes Tommy president of M-Tex if Monty dies or is incapacitated. Angela and Ainsley take the senior citizens to a strip club. The drug cartel kidnaps Tommy while he is meeting with its lieutenant. Tommy watches the cartel blow up a well before being taken to their hideout to be tortured. When Tommy is about to be killed, the cartel head Gallino arrives to save Tommy. He kills the lieutenant and his underlings for escalating the conflict between the cartel and M-Tex. Monty dies in the hospital. In the final scene, Tommy warns off a coyote as it inspects the dead coyote from the previous episode.

=== Season 2 (2025–26) ===
No. overall	No. in season	Title	Directed by	Written by	Original release date
11	1	"Death and a Sunset"	Stephen Kay	Taylor Sheridan	November 16, 2025
Cami Miller announces her active ownership of M-Tex at an oil and banking executives luncheon. In a last-minute improvised speech, she warns that her leadership will be more ruthless than her husband's. Several shareholders argue that their contracts with Monty are now invalidated upon his death, but Tommy rebukes them and challenges them to litigation. Cooper begins exploratory drilling on the leases he secured. One site strikes oil with a predicted volume of 500 barrels a day and annual turnover in the millions, setting up a potential significant future for him, Ariana, and her child. Ainsley secures a walk-on spot with the cheerleading team at TCU, and Angela starts planning to purchase a home in Fort Worth to be closer to her. T.L. Norris, Tommy's estranged father, is informed that his wife Dorothy died as he watches the sunset outside his retirement home in the Texas panhandle. After an argument with Angela during dinner, Tommy also receives the news.
12	2	"Sins of the Father"	Stephen Kay	Taylor Sheridan	November 23, 2025
All six drills on Cooper's wells are successful, but Ariana is intimidated by the prospect of his newfound wealth and losing another partner to the job. She asks Cooper to move out. Tommy discovers that Sonrisa, the company who funded Cooper's drills, is linked to the Gallino cartel. Tommy travels to Canadian to arrange his mother's funeral. After meeting with T.L., he speaks with Cooper about his parents' drug addictions and domestic abuse, and how he tried to break the cycle by being a mostly absent father. Cooper tells Tommy he loves him regardless. Angela and Ainsley get into an altercation with THHSC inspectors at the retirement home, but are released by Sheriff Joeberg when it is deemed self defense. M-Tex is sued by an insurance company, alleging they misappropriated a $420 million settlement after a rig was damaged by a hurricane off the coast of Louisiana. Rebecca Falcone, now in-house counsel, negotiates for M-Tex to build a new rig; she persuades the insurers to withdraw the damages claim as they first breached the contract by paying a lump sum of compensation, invalidating the subsequent damages clause. Cami appears to discover further evidence of financial impropriety when looking through Monty's offices.
13	3	"Almost a Home"	Stephen Kay	Taylor Sheridan	November 30, 2025
A hydrogen sulfide leak at an abandoned pump jack kills several hunters, and hospitalizes two of Dale and Boss's colleagues. Ariana gets a job bartending at The Patch Cafe. Tommy confronts Danny 'Gallino' Morrell, who presents publicly as a legitimate financial investor via a front organization. He remarks that Gallino's plan to in debt Cooper to him failed after all six wells struck. Gallino reminds Tommy he saved his life, and insists they become business partners to their mutual benefit. Cami, Rebecca, and Nate discover M-Tex has maxed out lines of credit with numerous banks, and cannot trace revenue originally paid into a C corp holding company to pay them off or fund further drilling. Fearing an IRS audit, Tommy and Cami confront Monty's personal lawyer Alan Thomas at a private club that Gallino also attends, and he agrees to set up a meeting to clarify the company's complex legal structure. Angela inadvertently ropes the group into drinking with Gallino and his wife, Bella. Gallino tells Cami he is an investor, and she remarks M-Tex may need one. Angela and Tommy agree to get re-married. After returning home, Cami breaks down holding a photo of Monty and her.
14	4	"Dancing Rainbows"	Stephen Kay	Taylor Sheridan	December 7, 2025
The Norris family drive to the small town of Canadian for Tommy's mother's interment. Cooper and Ariana reconcile, and she accompanies him. Afterwards, T.L. reminisces of happier times and his misplaced hope that his wife would eventually change, but Tommy only remembers her abuse. He later tells Ainsley he had a baby sister who died of SIDS, which triggered his mother's descent into alcoholism. Having worked with the elderly in the retirement home, a sympathetic Angela invites T.L. to live the rest of his life with the family in Midland, to Tommy's reluctant agreement. An M-Tex truck crashes near a pump jack, killing the driver. On a turbulent flight back to Midland, Rebecca meets Charlie, a charming oil worker. He helps her overcome her fear of flying with alcohol, and the two later sleep together. Cami visits Monty's grave. Unaware of his true background, she then approaches Gallino for a loan to fund the new Louisiana offshore rig, which he agrees to provide. Jerrell Teague, Boss's colleague injured in the hydrogen sulfide leak, faces the potential of losing his eyesight.
15	5	"The Pirate Dinner"	Stephen Kay	Taylor Sheridan	December 14, 2025
Tommy discovers Gallino's loan to Cooper was never paid. After criticizing Cooper's naivety, he makes an offer for M-Tex to buy out the leases and cover incurred costs to free him, provided he works for the company. Cooper agrees, disappointed he will not become as rich as expected. Tommy informs Gallino, but he gloats they will end up business partners anyway since Cami approached him for the offshore well. Ariana asks Cooper to travel to Corpus Christi to ask her father's permission to marry her. The insurer demands that M-Tex construct the new well in 45 days, or they will litigate and pursue criminal charges via a grand jury. Alan reveals $800 million in company revenue is locked in investment funds as part of a complex tax avoidance strategy and can't yet be withdrawn. He recommends tactically filing for bankruptcy to recover the money. Tommy confides in Cami that Gallino runs a cartel, and the legal liability of mixing M-Tex finances with the cartel's by accepting a loan. Cami, not wanting to lose the business or file for Chapter 11, argues she has plausible deniability about Gallino's dealings and orders Tommy to proceed regardless, causing friction between them. T.L. settles into the Norris household.
16	6	"Dark Night of the Soul"	Stephen Kay	Taylor Sheridan	December 21, 2025
Dale, Boss and their colleagues B.R. and Russ attend the Permian Basin International Oil Show. Ariana tells Isabel, Elvio's grandmother, she plans to marry Cooper. Realising his intentions are serious, Isabel accepts this and bonds with him. Angela offers Cooper her old engagement ring and pressures Tommy to buy her a new one. Tommy meets with Gallino and Cami at the Will Rogers Memorial Center to finalise the loan deal. Gallino discuss the titular poem Dark Night of the Soul. T.L. gets in a fight with a former colleague who insults his wife, and narrowly avoids arrest. He later encourages Tommy to remarry Angela and continue making memories before getting too old, like him. Rebecca meets the geologist hired by Nate to oversee logistics of drilling the new well in the Gulf of Mexico, who turns out to be Charlie, and the two resume flirting. Tommy tells Gallino that Cami doesn't fully trust his instincts because, unlike Monty, he lost nearly everything in the 2008 financial crisis. Gallino warns Tommy more cartels are taking interest in the oil business, and he needs to fully regain her trust or the whole company will be at risk.
17	7	"Forever Is an Instant"	Stephen Kay	Taylor Sheridan	December 28, 2025
Charlie tells Rebecca there is only a ten percent chance the new gas well will produce. She and Nate decide to litigate to prolong the process until M-Tex funds can be released, believing a lay jury trial will benefit them instead of professional arbitration. Nate discovers Rebecca has slept with Charlie, her subordinate, and is bound to report her actions to the board. Rebecca tells Tommy first, who dismisses her concerns due to her work ethic, and the various other workplace violations that happen daily at M-Tex that go unreported. He urges Nate not to make enemies with Rebecca. Dale, Russ and B.R. celebrate Boss's 20 years at M-Tex at a cookout. After receiving a commemorative Rolex, Boss tells his colleagues he intends to retire in a year. T.L. reminds Tommy he is in a way better position in life, but can’t seem to see it. That evening, he reaffirms his love for Angela. Cooper proposes to Ariana with his mother's engagement ring.
18	8	"Handsome Touched Me"	Stephen Kay	Taylor Sheridan	January 4, 2026
Tommy hires Cheyenne, a local stripper, to act as a physical therapist for T.L. Angela and Ainsley take the seniors to a casino in Carlsbad, New Mexico and give their nurse, Margaret, a makeover. Tommy appoints Cooper as project manager to assess his six wells that M-Tex took over alongside Dale, Boss, King and B.R. In a meeting, Tommy, Rebecca and Nate try to convince Cami the safer option is litigation. However, she instructs Charlie to proceed with the well drill when he explains if they do find gas, the revenue generated will be significant, also not wanting to lose the company. Concerned about her decision, Tommy tells Gallino of the low odds in the hope he will back out. However, he reveals that Cami secured the loan with royalties, which will benefit him regardless but kill M-Tex if the drilling fails. Charlie hits a personal nerve with Rebecca in an argument after the meeting with Cami.
19	9	"Plans, Tears and Sirens"	Stephen Kay	Taylor Sheridan	January 11, 2026
Rebecca and Charlie reconcile their relationship before he travels to the rig for six months. Angela gets emotional dropping off Ainsley at a TCU cheerleading summer camp. Ainsley struggles to bond with her demanding, non-binary roommate Paigyn. Despite an admissions counsellor encouraging Ainsley to overcome the issue herself, Angela intervenes, obtaining her a waiver to spend the week in a hotel. Cooper has Boss and the team drill a wildcat well in the same vicinity of his six wells. Cami, Tommy, Rebecca, Nate and Dale travel to Louisiana and meet with Gallino and Bella to watch the rig launch. In private, Cami criticizes Tommy's overcautious leadership and fires him for his unwillingness to take risks. T.L. and Cheyenne further bond, and she tells him her real name is Penny. Ariana is attacked outside of work by a wealthy customer whose advances she previously rejected. Cooper intervenes, and she talks him out of beating the assailant to death.
20	10	"Tragedy and Flies"	Stephen Kay	Taylor Sheridan	January 18, 2026
After Ariana's attacker dies in the ER, the police accuse Cooper of murder. Rebecca, Tommy and Sheriff Joeberg highlight the negative optics of prosecuting a man saving his fiancée, and convince the county attorney not to file charges. After Paigyn helps Ainsley in training, and Ainsley defends them from transphobic bullies, the two agree to try being roommates again. Tommy declines a job offer from competitor Bob Knowles, and reluctantly meets with Gallino. He convinces him to revive the original contract with Cooper for the new oil wells, much more likely to succeed than the gas venture, and cautions him on Cami's inexperience and M-Tex's considerable debt. Gallino warns if Tommy's venture fails he will take what he loves the most. Nate declines Cami's offer to become interim President, and urges her to sell M-Tex before resigning. With M-Tex having covered the existing debt before he was fired, Tommy forms a new company, CTT Oil Exploration and Cattle, funded by Gallino, which will work the new wells and drill more. He appoints Cooper as President, Nate as Treasurer, Rebecca as COO and Chief Counsel, and also recruits Ariana, Dale, Boss and his crew and T.L. While looking at the sunset from his back yard in Midland, Tommy spots a coyote and tells it "You can't have today, bud. Today is mine."

== Production ==
=== Development ===
In February 2022, Paramount+ ordered a television series inspired by the podcast Boomtown titled Landman from screenwriter Taylor Sheridan. Billy Bob Thornton stars in the series. In May 2023, Jacob Lofland, Ali Larter, and Michelle Randolph joined the series. In January 2024, Kayla Wallace, James Jordan, Mark Collie, and Paulina Chávez joined the series as series regulars. In February 2024, it was reported that Jon Hamm joined the series. In April 2024, it was reported that Octavio Rodriguez and J. R. Villarreal joined the series as recurring characters.

In May 2024, it was confirmed by Demi Moore that a second season was planned, with production set to commence in early 2025. In March 2025, Paramount+ renewed the series for a second season.

In April 2025, it was announced that Sam Elliott joined the cast as a series regular for the second season. In June 2025, it was reported that Stefania Spampinato was cast in a recurring role for the second season.

In December 2025, Paramount+ renewed the series for a third season.

=== Filming ===
Filming started in and around Fort Worth, Texas, in February 2024 and concluded in June 2024. Filming locations included the headquarters of the American Association of Professional Landmen, the national association that represents land professionals, as well as the Fort Worth Petroleum Club, Rivercrest Country Club, and Texas Christian University. Filming for the second season started in April 2025 and concluded in August 2025. Filming for the third season was scheduled to commence in May 2026, but was later delayed until September.

=== Music ===
Andrew Lockington, who worked in Mayor of Kingstown and Lioness, has composed the music for the series, marking his third collaboration with the series' creator. UMG Nashville has released the series' seasons 1 and 2 soundtracks. Some of the songs in the soundtrack albums were written by actors Billy Bob Thornton and Mark Collie. Music from Yellowstone actress/musician Lainey Wilson is used in season 2.

== Release ==
Promotional poster

The first season launched with two episodes on Paramount+ on November 17, 2024. Subsequent episodes of the 10-episode first season were available weekly on Sundays through January 12, 2025. The second season premiered on November 16, 2025.

== Reception ==
=== Critical response ===
Critical response of Landman
Season	Rotten Tomatoes	Metacritic
1	78% (37 reviews)	60 (20 reviews)
2	83% (41 reviews)	66 (8 reviews)

On the review aggregator website Rotten Tomatoes, the series has an approval rating of 78% based on 37 critic reviews. The website's critics consensus reads, "Landman plumbs much of the same territory as other Taylor Sheridan–penned series, but having Billy Bob Thornton on hand turns this Texas crude into highly watchable fuel." Metacritic, which uses a weighted average, assigned a score of 60 out of 100 based on 20 critics, indicating "mixed or average" reviews.

The second season has an 83% approval rating on Rotten Tomatoes based on 41 critic reviews. The website's critics consensus reads, "Further refining its brutish elements into addictive drama, Landman's second season makes minor improvements in its treatment of female characters while continuing to benefit from Billy Bob Thornton's hangdog swagger." Metacritic, which uses a weighted average, assigned a score of 66 out of 100 based on eight critics, indicating "generally favorable" reviews.

=== Criticism ===
==== Renewable energy ====
Reviewers have criticized a scene where the fictional oil man Tommy Norris falsely claims that the amount of steel, oil, and concrete needed to construct a wind turbine produces such a high carbon footprint that it will not offset the costs over the course of its lifespan (said to be twenty years). This dialog led many conservatives to repost the clip on social media. Life cycle analyses of wind energy show that far more carbon is offset by wind energy than is produced during wind turbine construction. Joshua Rhodes, an energy researcher at the University of Texas at Austin, estimates that a wind turbine offsets the carbon spent to make it within one year.

==== Female characters ====
The program has also been criticized, at least in the first season, for presenting female characters as caricatures and negative stereotypes of women. A reviewer for Texas Monthly writes "With all the low-cut tops, high-cut shorts, and dumb-blonde dialogue, I felt like I was watching a racy reboot of a T & A show." When reviewing the first two episodes of the first season, the reviewer from National Public Radio noted that the talents of Demi Moore and Ali Larter were being underutilized and in those scenes, they were "playing caricatures and male fantasies". A writer from Rolling Stone noted that "The show gives an unsolicited glimpse of what The Dukes of Hazzard would have looked like if it had been on late-night Cinemax. Thornton’s Tommy has an ex-wife and a daughter who are seemingly characters plucked from dubious scenarios on PornHub." In her review for Entertainment Weekly, the reviewer wrote "the women of Landman exist solely in the context of how they are perceived by Tommy and his cowboy cohorts — put simply, they are around to distract, annoy, titillate, entreat, or yell at the men." A writer for The New Yorker commented "The screenwriting plays fast and loose with sexist stereotypes; Tommy’s ex-wife, Angela (played by Ali Larter), with whom he rekindles a relationship, is a kind of red-state Manic Pixie Dream MILF, flaunting her cleavage, giving road head, and acting crazy when she’s getting her period." While reviewing Sheridan's writing style, a critic for Vulture wrote, "But what’s tough to digest is how so much of that simplicity is tied to the whole misogyny thing — and it is misogyny, no doubt about it. In addition to being some weird expression of daddy-daughter shit that Sheridan is clearly obsessed with, Ainsley is such a difficult character to defend as a creation: an excessively sexualized teenage daughter, played by an obviously older woman, who’s perpetually scantily clad around older men. It’s just icky."

In contrast, actress Ali Larter defended Sheridan's controversial writing style claiming that he writes "women in their prime, that were still allowed to be alive." Larter also defended her portrayal of Angela, "stating that Angela is 'able to express that side of herself', and that 'the character is a full rainbow'." Actress Michelle Randolph also defended Sheridan and her own portrayal of Ainsley.

==== Paul Harvey ====
On June 23, 2025, Paulynne, Inc., which owns and controls all of famed broadcaster Paul Harvey's intellectual property, sued Paramount Global in New York federal court. The company sued Paramount for using a 90-second audio clip from The Rest of the Story in Landman without permission. Paramount used a segment about rising gas prices from Harvey's 2009 "Gas Crisis" episode in the opening of Landman's Season 1 finale. The lawsuit accused Paramount of failing to obtain permission to use the clip as well as editing the clip to change Harvey's viewpoint with regard to government fossil-fuel policies and his interest in alternative fuels.

=== Accolades ===
Award	Year	Category	Nominee(s)	Result	Ref.
Actor Awards	2026	Outstanding Performance by an Ensemble in a Drama Series	Paulina Chávez, Mark Collie, Sam Elliott, Colm Feore, Andy Garcia, James Jordan, Ali Larter, Jacob Lofland, Caleb Martin, Demi Moore, Michelle Randolph, Mustafa Speaks, Billy Bob Thornton, and Kayla Wallace	Nominated	
Actor Awards	2026	Outstanding Action Performance by a Stunt Ensemble in a Television Series	Landman	Nominated	
Critics' Choice Television Awards	2026	Best Actor in a Drama Series	Billy Bob Thornton	Nominated	
Golden Globe Awards	2025	Best Actor – Television Series Drama	Billy Bob Thornton	Nominated	
Location Managers Guild Awards	2025	Outstanding Locations in Contemporary Television	Dustin Daniels, Stuart Berberich	Nominated	
Satellite Awards	2025	Best Actor – Television Series Drama	Billy Bob Thornton	Nominated	
Satellite Awards	2026	Best Cast – Television Series	Paulina Chávez, Mark Collie, Sam Elliott, Colm Feore, Andy Garcia, James Jordan, Ali Larter, Jacob Lofland, Caleb Martin, Demi Moore, Michelle Randolph, Mustafa Speaks, Billy Bob Thornton, and Kayla Wallace	Won	
