= Energy management (degree) =

Business-specific degree

Energy Management (EM) is a business-specific degree, with a broad curriculum focusing on multiple facets of the energy industry: business (accounting, management, marketing, economics and MIS), geology, petroleum engineering, and law. The American Association of Professional Landmen (AAPL) provides curriculum guidance and program support for approved petroleum land management programs. Currently, the AAPL has 10 accredited universities in the United States and Canada.

The University of Oklahoma offered the first degree of this kind, emerging in 1958 as the Petroleum Land Management program before becoming the Energy Management program in 1999. The University of Oklahoma program remains one of the top energy management programs in the United States.

Most students pursuing a degree in Energy Management enter the industry as landmen, working with energy companies securing leases for drilling and mineral rights as well as contracting with property owners and energy brokers. It is also common for the landman to work alongside landmen from other companies to secure joint ventures in drilling. There are also career opportunities for EM students in commodities marketing and trading and in international negotiations.

The University of Tulsa, Texas Tech University, University of Calgary, University of Louisiana at Lafayette, University of Wyoming, University of Texas Permian Basin, and Western State Colorado University all offer similar AAPL approved degrees focusing on energy business education.
