= Government of Truckee, California =

Government of the Town of Truckee
- Formation: March 23, 1993; 33 years ago
- Website: townoftruckee.gov

Legislative branch
- Legislature: Truckee Town Council
- Meeting place: Truckee Town Hall

Executive branch
- Mayor: Mayor of Truckee
- Appointed by: Election

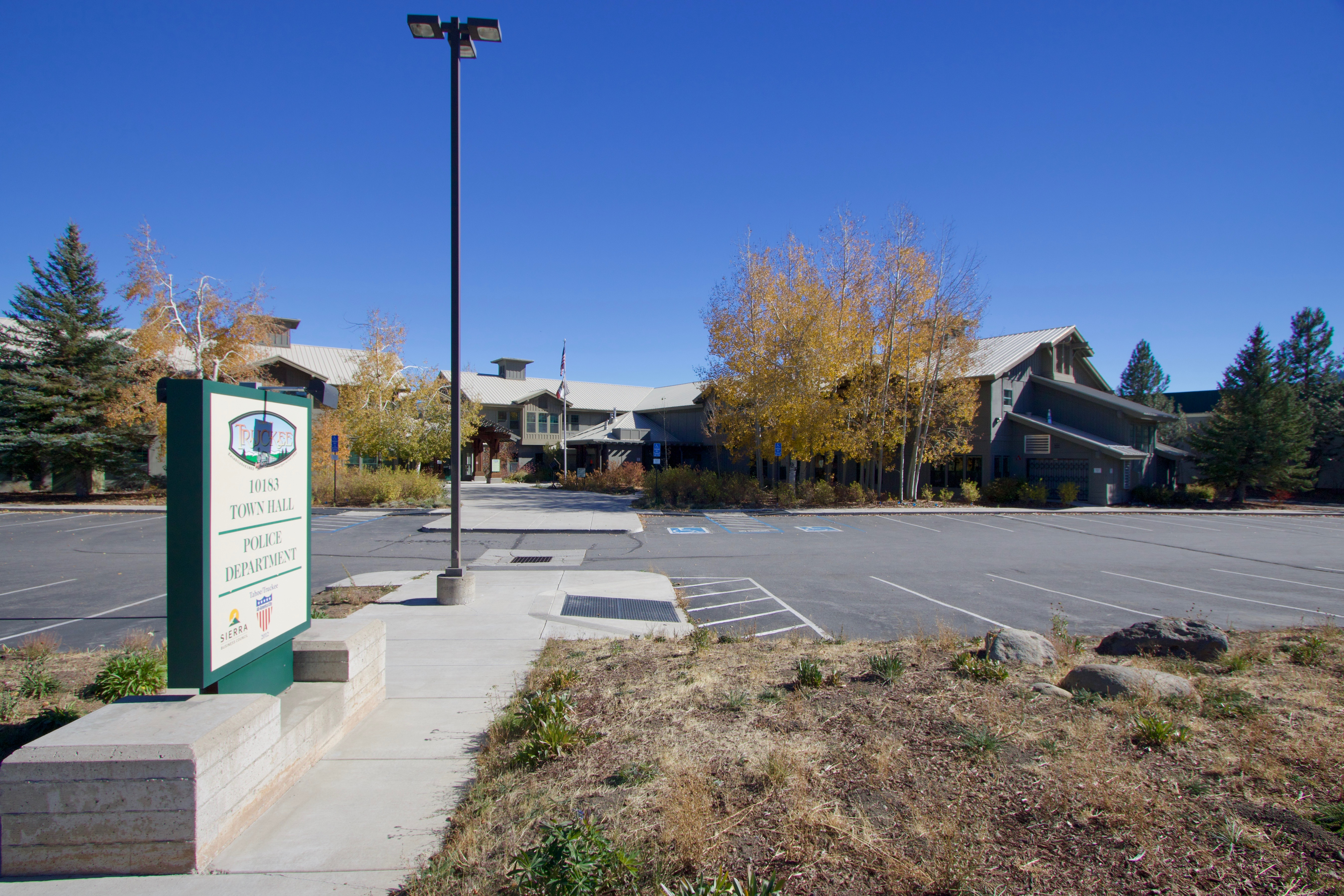
Truckee Town Hall and Police Department.

The government of the Town of Truckee operates as an incorporated town.

== Incorporation ==
Truckee was incorporated in 1993 after a November 1992 vote with over 70% approval, with the primary issues being land-use planning, snow removal, and road maintenance.

The incorporation effort was led by a grassroots group called Planning for Tomorrow in Truckee, and civic enthusiasm was high. Early achievements of the first council included the Glenshire Bridge, the McIver undercrossing, Truckee's first roundabout, and paving of Jibboom Street.

== Local Government ==
=== Town Council ===
Truckee uses a Council-Manager form of government. Five council members are elected at large to four-year overlapping terms. The council selects one member to serve as Mayor and another as Vice Mayor at its first December meeting following elections.

=== Town Manager ===
The council appoints a professional Town Manager to handle day-to-day administration, which is a defining feature of the council-manager model.

=== Planning Commission ===
Each council member appoints a single Planning Commissioner, whose term runs from March of every odd year, coinciding with council elections.

== State and Federal Representation ==
In the California State Legislature, Truckee is in the the 4th senatorial district, represented by Republican Marie Alvarado-Gil and the the 1st Assembly district, represented by Republican Heather Hadwick.In the United States House of Representatives, it is represented by California's 3rd congressional district, represented by Independent Kevin Kiley.

== Departments ==
The Town of Truckee operates several departments under the Town Manager. The Truckee Police Department provides law enforcement services. The Public Works Department handles road maintenance, snow removal, and infrastructure. The Community Development Department involves planning, building, and environmental services. The Parks and Recreation Department maintains parks, trails, and community facilities. Keep Truckee Green is a dedicated division supporting the town's environmental sustainability.

== Finance ==
The town's sales tax rate is 8.5%, including a 0.5% Measure V roads tax. In 2014, voters approved Measure R, creating a quarter-cent trails tax, renewed and expanded to a half-cent as Measure U in June 2022, generating approximately $3 million annually for trail construction and maintenance, including the Truckee River Legacy Trail. Measure U became effective on October 1, 2024. Measure E, approved in November 2024, adds a half-cent sales tax generating approximately $3.5 million annually for wildfire preparation, transit, environmental protection, and workforce housing. Measure K, approved in November 2020, increased the Transient Occupancy Tax from 10% to 12%, applying only to hotel and short-term rental guests rather than residents. It's expected to generate approximately $700,000 annually.

== Politics ==
United States presidential election results for Truckee, California
Year	Republican		Democratic		Third party(ies)	
Year	No.	%	No.	%	No.	%
2012	4,342	63.38%	2,294	33.48%	215	3.14%
2016	5,135	66.24%	1,996	25.75%	621	8.01%
2020	7,459	75.32%	2,202	22.24%	242	2.44%
2024	7,090	74.24%	2,190	22.93%	270	2.83%

Truckee has voted for every Democratic Party candidate for president since at least 2012. In the 2020 and 2024 elections, over 74% of voters voted for the Democratic candidate.
