= Target Hospitality =

Temporary housing company

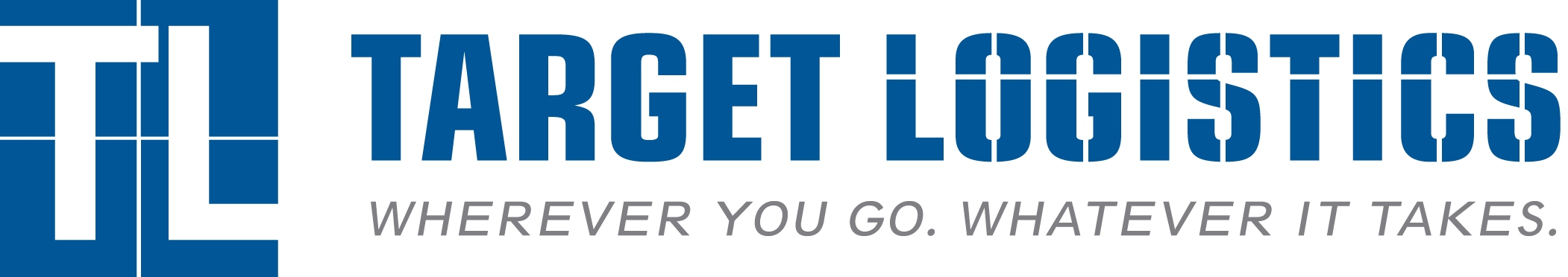
- Company type: Public
- Traded as: Nasdaq: TH
- Founded: 1978
- Headquarters: The Woodlands, Texas
- Products: Temporary housing, workforce housing, oil field housing
- Services: Site construction, site management, catering, transportation, security, turnarounds, recreation, skilled labor
- Number of employees: 450
- Parent: Algeco Scotsman
- Website: www.targethospitality.com

Target Hospitality (formerly Target Logistics and Target Lodging) is a company that provides workforce lodging and other temporary, modular housing used for oil, gas and mining operations; large-scale events; and disaster relief. Target Hospitality is based in The Woodlands, Texas, and also has offices in Williston, North Dakota; Denver, Colorado; Calgary, Alberta.

== Overview ==
Target Hospitality provides workforce lodging, mobile crew camps, and extended stay hotels. Along with designing and constructing these accommodations, Target Hospitality provides facility management and on-site services such as, catering, security, housekeeping, operations and maintenance, and transportation.

Target Hospitality is owned by Algeco Scotsman, a business services provider focused on modular space and secure storage. Target Hospitality has approximately 450 total employees. As of 2012 it operated 16 properties in North America with more than 5,000 total beds.

== History ==
Target Logistics provided temporary housing for the FBI, Secret Service, and other government security personnel during the 2002 Winter Olympics in Salt Lake City, Utah. Following the 2002 Olympics project, the company began focusing on temporary housing.

In 2005, the company provided disaster relief housing for those displaced in the aftermath of Hurricane Katrina. In 2006, Target Logistics began work to complete unfinished military housing in Basra, Iraq.

In 2007, the company began its first natural resources project, providing housing for copper mine operations in Morenci, Arizona. Its first oil field project was in 2010, when the company expanded into North Dakota. The majority of the company's current operations take place in the region, as a result of the North Dakota oil boom.

In 2012, Target Logistics continued its work in the oil industry and expanded into South Texas to support the Permian Basin and the Eagle Ford Shale operations. In this year, Target Logistics also introduced its mobile crew camps, which are self-contained, movable structures designed for operations that need to relocate frequently, such as pipeline transport and transmission line construction.

In February 2013, Target Logistics was acquired by Algeco Scotsman, a company headquartered in Baltimore, Maryland, that provides modular space, temporary building systems, and storage solutions. Algeco Scotsman has more than 310,000 modular space and storage units and operates in 38 countries. The deal was seen by Target Logistics as an opportunity to expand its business globally.

In 2018, Target Logistics changed their name to Target Lodging to better align their brand with their offering.

In March 2019, Target Lodging changed its name to Target Hospitality upon the completion of an acquisition by Platinum Eagle Acquisition Corp and began trading on the NASDAQ stock exchange under the ticker symbols TH and THWWW.

== Operations and services ==
Target Lodging formerly specialized in group travel and travel-related logistics services; however, the company shifted its focus to temporary housing that primarily serves the oil, gas and mining industries.

Their Target Hyper/Scale brand provides accommodations and hospitality services to the digital infrastructure market.

=== Current ===
The majority of the company's current operations support the oil, gas, and mining industries. The bulk of its activity is in North Dakota, as a result of the North Dakota oil boom from the Bakken Formation. In addition to its North Dakota properties, Target Hospitality operates a number of properties in Texas, as well as in Arizona and Mexico.

==== North Dakota ====
Out of the 16 properties Target Hospitality operates in North America, 12 are located in North Dakota. The company's presence in North Dakota is a result of the oil boom in the area around the Bakken Formation. North Dakota now produces 11 percent of U.S. oil, and oil production is the primary reason the state's government has a surplus of $3.8 billion. The increased drilling operations in the region have drawn large numbers of people looking for work to the state.

As a result of the oil boom, North Dakota is the fastest-growing state, with the state's population growing at three times the rate of that of the nation as a whole over the past year. In 2012, North Dakota also reported the lowest unemployment rate in the nation at 3.2 percent. Unemployment in North Dakota has been below 4 percent since March 2010. The demand for workers is constant in the region; both oil companies and local businesses have large numbers of unfilled positions. But there is also a high demand for housing and a shortage of housing available. North Dakota's unique economic climate created a "novelty problem: plenty of jobs, but nowhere to put the people who hold them."

The 12 Target Hospitality properties in North Dakota have more than 4,000 beds. The facilities are customized for the working conditions and designed using the same specifications as those made for oil workers operating in the Arctic Circle.

=== Past ===
==== Olympic Games ====
Before working with clients in the oil, gas, and mining industries, Target Logistics provided logistics services at a number of the Olympic Games. The company was awarded contracts for logistics services for the 1984 Winter Olympics in Sarajevo, Yugoslavia (present-day Bosnia-Herzegovina); the 1992 Summer Olympics in Barcelona, Spain; the 1996 Summer Olympics in Atlanta, Georgia; the 2000 Summer Olympics in Sydney, Australia; the 2002 Winter Olympics in Salt Lake City, Utah; the 2004 Summer Olympics in Athens, Greece; the 2006 Winter Olympics in Turin, Italy; and the 2010 Winter Olympics in Vancouver, British Columbia, Canada.

==== Large events ====
Target Logistics provided logistics services for a number of large-scale events, such as the Harley-Davidson 100th anniversary celebration in 2003 in Milwaukee, Wisconsin; the Woodstock 25th anniversary festival in 1994 and the Woodstock 30th anniversary festival in 1999, both in Bethel, New York; and the Bonnaroo Music Festival in Manchester, Tennessee.

==== Disaster relief ====
Target Logistics offered disaster relief support following Hurricane Katrina in 2005 and Hurricane Ike in 2008. In the aftermath of Hurricane Katrina, Target Lodging operated a 1,100-bed cruise ship anchored in the Gulf of Mexico to house those displaced by the hurricane. Target Lodging also built and managed a 700-person modular camp in New Orleans with running water, electricity, and on-site kitchen services. In the aftermath of Hurricane Ike, Target Hospitality provided catering and food services for 600 personnel to support relief operations.

== "Man camps" and controversy ==
Man camps is the common term for the workforce housing in the oil, gas, and mining industry. Target Hospitality and other housing providers advocate using the term crew camp or temporary workforce lodging because of the negative connotation of man camp. The company and its competitors also object to the term "man camp" because it is often used to describe oil field housing facilities that are not professionally operated.

Man camps located near Indigenous territories are correlated with increased sex trafficking, sexual assault, and violence against Indigenous women. The Bakken region, where Target Hospitality manages 12 installations has reported steep increases in these crimes. Company representative Rick Perkins stated in court that there had been no complaints of rape or sexual harassment at man camps run by Target Logistics despite reports to the contrary.

The oil boom's impact on housing in North Dakota has been a controversial issue since oil production in the Bakken took off. In June 2013 officials in Williams County, North Dakota, put a moratorium on "so-called man camps that house Oil Patch workers." The Williams County Planning and Zoning Commission recommended that the county refrain from both issuing permits for new workforce housing and allowing existing facilities to expand. Officials pushed for this moratorium because they believe the "man camps" were hurting the region and inhibiting the growth of the communities.

While many oppose the expansion of workforce housing in North Dakota, the effects of such facilities have yet to be fully understood; however, two professors from the University of North Dakota are currently conducting research on the long-term impact of workforce housing in the region. The facilities in their study range from the professionally operated lodges such as those run by Target Hospitality, to areas that have people living in tents and trailers without basic amenities.

Some of the negative effects of the influx of workers include increased crime rates that have been recorded in oil producing counties and strains on law enforcement, emergency services, as well as infrastructure such as roads, water, and sewerage. While some see workforce housing as part of the problem, others see it as "a temporary and self-contained salve." Target Hospitality has responded to criticisms about the existence of "man camps" in North Dakota, describing the company as "a necessary and high-quality Band-Aid that will allow the Bakken to grow."

== Community involvement and recognition ==
=== API Achievement Award ===
In 2012, Target Lodging received an API Achievement Award. The Williston Basin Chapter of API (American Petroleum Institute) honored Target Lodging with an award for community service, recognizing the company for its "keen sense of corporate citizenship towards the communities and environments in which it operates."

=== Inc. 5000 ===
In 2012 Target Lodging was named one of America's fastest-growing private companies by Inc. magazine. Target Lodging was number #305 on the list of 5,000, with three-year growth of 1,225 percent. Its revenue increased from $3.5 million in 2008 to $45.8 million in 2011. Inc. also ranked Target Lodging number #19 on the list of top 100 business products and services companies.

== Articles ==
- Oil Workers Call 'Man Camps' Home
- Oil Rigs Bring Camps of Men to the Prairie
- A man camp fit for a king: Public, commissioners tour Dunn County Lodge
- North Dakota crew camps bane for some, salve for others

== Video clips ==
- Inside a North Dakota 'Man Camp'
- No simple solution to Oil Patch housing crunch
- North Dakota Boomtown Suffers Growing Pains Trying to Keep Up with Demand
- Boomtown USA
- North Dakota's Oil Rush: If the Boom Goes Bust
- Fire, Ice and Fortune
