= Man camp =

Temporary housing for workers in resource extraction industries

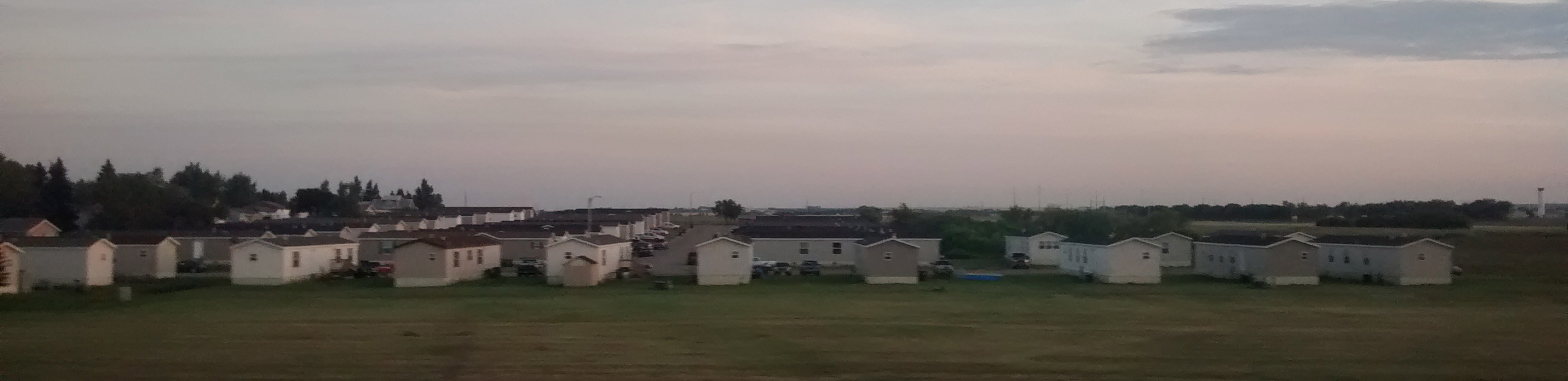
Man camp in North Dakota

Man camps are temporary workforce housing to accommodate a large influx of high-paid workers in the resource extraction industries, especially in Canada and the United States. Twentieth century boom–bust housing cycles related to the oil and gas industry made companies reluctant to invest in permanent housing for temporary workforces.

The term 'man camp' was popularized in association with the Bakken oil boom in North Dakota. Media and photography depicting the transient workers drawn to this boom led The New York Times to select 'man camp' as one of the most important words of 2012. Workforces in the resource extraction industries are overwhelmingly male, and studies of man camps conclude that they are hyper-masculine environments—although they do include some women.

Man camps are frequently located in remote locations and can overwhelm local infrastructure and emergency services. One study of man camps documented three distinct types: ranging from dormitory style prefabricated compounds that provide full services for thousands of workers to informal congregations of RVs squatting on vacant land (possibly in violation of local ordinances). Larger dormitory-style camps may have strict rules for residents' behavior, but others may have little oversight. Man camps have been associated with violent crime and sex trafficking. When man camps are near or overlap with Native American reservations, they are strongly correlated with higher rates of violence against and sex trafficking of Native American women. Several studies have confirmed this pattern of violence.

== History ==
In the early 20th century, throughout the Permian Basin in west Texas, oil and gas industry companies often built permanent family housing for their employees in camps throughout the region. Workers stayed with the same company, but moved between camps, which racially were generally a monoculture of whites, and were modeled after company mining camps in the West and textile mill camps in the East. This type of company housing began to be replaced with temporary camps for transient workers in the 1950's and 1960's, as the boom-bust cycle of the oil and gas industry made it uneconomical to have a stable, permanent workforce.

== Overview ==
Camps are part of an increasingly significant shift of global human population toward temporary or mobile housing in the 21st century. Use of the term 'man camp' became popular during the Bakken oil boom, which began in 2006, peaked in 2012, and draws large numbers of workers—overwhelmingly men—into western North Dakota, creating a housing shortage. The North Dakota Man Camp Project studied over 50 man camps in the Bakken region and classified them according to three types. Type 1 camps are large dormitory-style prefabricated compounds that provide full services to hundreds or thousands of workers. These camps most commonly house workers for multi-national corporations. Type 2 camps resemble RV parks, offer fewer amenities than type 1 camps, but do have some administration and minimal oversight from local government. Type 3 camps are typically small informal congregations of RVs squatting on vacant lots with no administration and possibly in violation of local ordinances. Broadly, the term man camp is ambiguously used to refer to any of these situations.

=== Type 1 camps ===
Some employers contract with companies that provide temporary workforce housing, like Target Hospitality (the biggest provider of man camp housing), to provide free housing to employees, at a cost to employers of $100+ per worker per night. Most camps have their own security, and Target's camps have rules prohibiting alcohol, firearms, and unauthorized women, which, if violated, generally result in eviction as well as termination of employment.

=== Violence and controversy ===
Man camps can overwhelm local communities, straining local infrastructure and services. Some local governments imposed moratoriums on man camps in the Bakken region. Some man camps have been associated with violent crime and sex trafficking. A Bureau of Justice Statistics study (2019) confirmed that media reporting of increased violence in the Bakken region was statistically verifiable. When man camps are near Native American reservations or overlap with Indigenous territories, they are strongly correlated with higher rates of violence against Indigenous women and sex trafficking. Several studies have confirmed this pattern of violence.

Indigenous people face particular risks from the influx of well-paid male workers brought by resource extraction projects. Companies hiring men often have relaxed standards that result with the employment of sex offenders. Complex jurisdictional law may leave tribal governments with little power to prosecute non-Indian offenders for crimes committed against tribal members. Resource extraction also has a long history of contributing to violence against Indigenous women, and some Indigenous scholars view the violence that occurs around man camps in relation to ongoing settler-colonialism and to other incidents of historical violence associated with resource extraction. There is often a perception that violence against Indigenous women will go unpunished. Federal, state, and tribal authorities are also ineffective with responding to sexual violence, often reacting slowly to incidents.

Man camps have also been criticised for increasing threats of COVID-19 to local Indigenous communities.

==== Activism ====
Land defenders and water protectors in the US and Canada at multiple conflicts such as Stop Line 3, Thacker Pass lithium mine, Keystone Pipeline, and the Coastal GasLink Pipeline have all cited concerns about man camps endangering Indigenous women.

==== Strategies to address violence ====
Researchers familiar with the epidemic of violence against Indigenous women have proposed a strategic plan to mitigate harm from man camps that would improve victim services, increase access to culturally appropriate drug treatment, build up the criminal justice system, and promote corporate social responsibility for mitigating violence from man camps.

Ana Condes suggests a legal strategy for tribes to make use of 'bad men clauses' in 1867–68 treaties that could compel federal law enforcement to protect Indigenous women from the violence of man camps.

== See also ==
- Bunkhouse
- Crew car, or Railroad car bunkhouse
- Logging camp
