= Bradley Snedeker =

American actor (born 1977)

- Born: September 18, 1977 (age 49); Denver, Colorado, U.S.
- Occupation: Actor
- Years active: 2002–present

Bradley Snedeker (born September 18, 1977) is an American actor. He starred as Dave in the comedy film The Pink Conspiracy (2007) and has appeared in television series including Westworld, Animal Kingdom, FBI: Most Wanted and Landman.

== Career ==
Snedeker began appearing on television in the early 2000s, with guest roles in series including Angel, JAG, NCIS, Cold Case, Drake & Josh, Reba and The Closer.

In 2007, he played his first leading film role as Dave in the independent comedy The Pink Conspiracy, directed by Marc Clebanoff and Brian Scott Miller. The film follows Dave as he discovers that a group of his former girlfriends have formed a conspiracy against him. Snedeker starred alongside Sarah Thompson, Mercedes McNab, James Russo, Dayton Callie and Chad Everett.

Snedeker subsequently continued primarily as a television character actor. His credits have included appearances in ER, The Young and the Restless, Justified, Westworld and Animal Kingdom.

In 2012, he appeared opposite Kellie Martin in the television romantic comedy I Married Who?, playing her fiancé, Mike.

His later work has included guest appearances in FBI: Most Wanted and a recurring role as Robert James in the Paramount+ drama series Landman.

His later television work has included appearances in Westworld, Animal Kingdom, FBI: Most Wanted and Landman. In 2026, he appeared in the FX psychological thriller series The Shards.

== Selected filmography ==
=== Film ===
Year	Title	Role	Notes
2007	The Pink Conspiracy	Dave	Lead role
2017	Truth or Dare		
2017	Death Waits for No Man		

=== Television ===
Year	Title	Role	Notes
2002	Angel		Guest role
2004	NCIS	Petty Officer Carnahan	Episode: "The Immortals"
2004	Drake & Josh		Guest role
2005	JAG		Guest role
2005	Cold Case		Guest role
2005	Reba		Guest role
2012	I Married Who?	Mike	Television film
2015	Justified		Guest role
2016	Westworld		Guest role
2018	Animal Kingdom		Guest role
2025	FBI: Most Wanted	Larry Biederman	Guest role
2025–2026	Landman	Robert James	Recurring role
2026	The Shards	Ben Fox	2 episodes
