= Boomtown (podcast) =

Podcast about big oil in the Permian Basin

Presentation
- Hosted by: Christian Wallace; Susan Elizabeth Shepard (guest co-host for two episodes)
- Genre: Big Oil; History of Texas; Business cycles; Climate change
- Format: Audio documentary
- Language: American English
- Updates: Tuesdays
- Length: 30–45 minutes

Production
- No. of seasons: 1
- No. of episodes: 12

Publication
- Original release: December 10, 2019 – April 30, 2020
- Provider: Imperative Entertainment and Texas Monthly

Related
- Website: www.texasmonthly.com/boomtown/

Boomtown is a podcast about the activities of major oil companies in the Permian Basin region mostly located in Texas in the United States.

The podcast is hosted by Christian Wallace and produced by Texas Monthly in partnership with Imperative Entertainment.

== Background ==
The show was produced by Texas Monthly in partnership with Imperative Entertainment, and syndicated on Marfa Public Radio. The show debuted on December 10, 2019, with Jason Hoch as the executive producer of the show. Boomtown is a narrative serialized show about the 21st century Texas oil boom that occurred in the Permian Basin. Christian Wallace—the host of the show—grew up in Andrews, Texas and previously spent a year as a roughneck in the oilfields working on drilling rigs. The first episode of the ten part series is about U.S. Route 285 in Texas known as "Death Highway" or the "Highway to Hell" because the traffic from tank trucks carrying oil has increased the number of deaths by 67% since the beginning of the oil boom.

At the end of each episode Wallace discloses that "Texas Monthly's parent company also owns interests in the midstream oil and gas industry among other diversified investments. Our editorial judgements are made independently of any such investments."

== Reception ==
In January 2020, CBS7 reported that the show hit number one on the iTunes and Spotify charts and had stayed within the top twenty documentary podcasts.

Laura Jane Standley and Eric McQuade of The Atlantic included the show on their list of the "50 Best Podcasts of 2020" saying that the "show is a beautiful ride filled with levity, even as it delivers troubling forecasts for the future." Erin Berger of Outside said "Boomtown ... prove[s] that good storytelling about devastating environmental issues is still vitally important, informative, and inspiring." David Leffler of Austin Monthly called the show "Compelling, illuminating, and gripping."

=== Awards ===
Award	Year	Category	Result	Ref.
Webby Awards	2021	Documentary Podcast	Honoree	

== Adaptation ==
In February 2022, Paramount+ ordered a television series inspired by Boomtown titled Landman from screenwriter Taylor Sheridan. Billy Bob Thornton stars in the series.
