= Indian Peace Commission =

1867 US government body

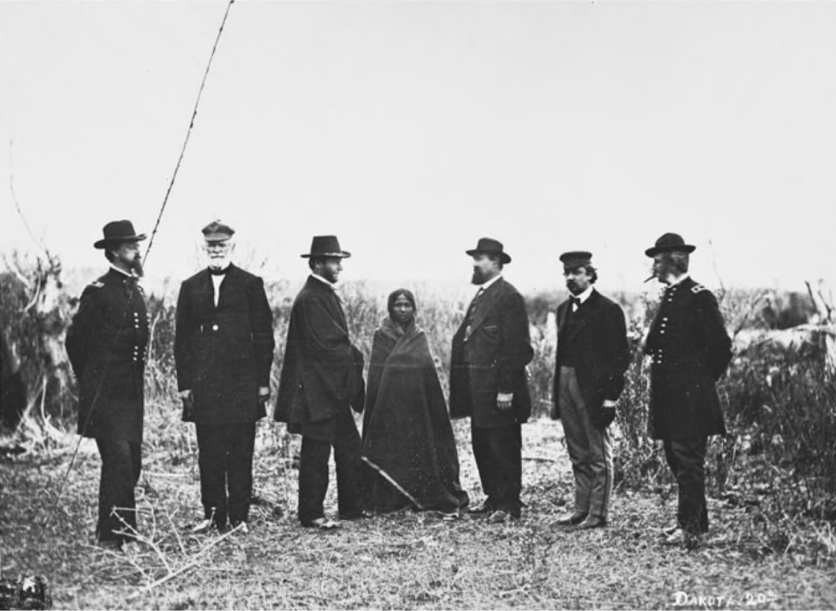
Indian Peace Commissioners and Sophie Mousseau, an Indigenous woman, from left to right, Terry, Harney, Sherman, Taylor, Tappan, and Augur

The Indian Peace Commission (also the Sherman, Taylor, or Great Peace Commission) was a group formed by an act of Congress on July 20, 1867 "to establish peace with certain hostile Indian tribes." It was composed of four civilians and three, later four, military leaders. Throughout 1867 and 1868, they negotiated with a number of tribes, including the Comanche, Kiowa, Arapaho, Kiowa-Apache, Cheyenne, Lakota, Navajo, Snake, Sioux, and Bannock. The treaties that resulted were designed to move the tribes to reservations, to "civilize" and assimilate these native peoples, and transition their societies from a nomadic to an agricultural existence.

As language and cultural barriers affected the negotiations, it remains doubtful whether the tribes were fully informed of the provisions they agreed to. The Commission approached the tribes as a representative democracy, while the tribes made decisions via consensus: Indian chiefs functioned as mediators and councilors, without the authority to compel obedience from others. The Commission acted as a representative of the United States Congress, but while Congress had authorized and funded the talks themselves, it did not fund any of the stipulations that the commissioners were empowered to negotiate. Once treaties were agreed to, the government was slow to act on some, and rejected others. Even for those treaties that were ratified, promised benefits were often delayed, or not provided at all. Congress was not compelled to support actions taken in its name, and eventually stopped the practice of treaty making with tribes in 1871.

The Indian Peace Commission was generally seen as a failure, and violence had reignited even before it was disbanded in October 1868. Two official reports were submitted to the federal government, ultimately recommending that the U.S. cease recognizing tribes as sovereign nations, refrain from making treaties with them, employ military force against those who refused to relocate to reservations, and move the Bureau of Indian Affairs from the Department of the Interior to the Department of War. The system of treaties eventually deteriorated to the point of collapse, and a decade of war followed the commission's work. It was the last major commission of its kind.

== Establishment ==
During the 1860s, national preoccupation with the ongoing American Civil War and the withdrawal of troops to fight it, had weakened the US government's control of the west. This, in addition to corruption throughout the Bureau of Indian Affairs, and the continued migration of the railroad and white settlers westward, led to a general restlessness and eventually armed conflict. Following the Sand Creek Massacre on November 29, 1864, where troops under John Chivington killed and mutilated more than a hundred friendly Cheyenne and Arapaho, half or more women and children, hostilities intensified. Congress dispatched an investigation into the conditions of Native American peoples under Senator James R. Doolittle. After two years of inquiry, Doolittle's 500-page report condemned the actions of Chivington and blamed tribal hostilities on the "aggressions of lawless white men".

On December 21, 1866, yet another conflict, the Fetterman Fight, saw the killing of an entire unit commanded by William J. Fetterman at the hands of Lakota, Sioux and Arapaho warriors as part of Red Cloud's War. William T. Sherman personally wrote to the Secretary of War and assured him that "if fifty Indians are allowed to remain between the Arkansas and Platte" they would "checkmate three thousand soldiers" and that action had to be taken. For Sherman, it made "little difference whether they be coaxed out by Indian commissioners or killed."

After four days of debate, Congress responded by establishing the Peace Commission on July 20, 1867, with a stated purpose "to establish peace with certain hostile Indian tribes." Their work was organized around three main goals in an effort to solve the "Indian question": (Note: As Colin G. Calloway notes, referring himself to the observations of Jill St. Germain, "[T]he very creation of the commission was somewhat 'irregular,' in that Congress 'authorized' the president to appoint a commission, an authorization he did not need because treaty making was the president's constitutional responsibility.")

1. to remove, if possible, the causes of war;
2. to secure, as far as practicable, our frontier settlements and the safe building of our railroads looking to the Pacific;
3. to suggest or inaugurate some plan for the civilization of the Indians.

Owing to the high cost of waging war in the West, (Note: By one estimate $1 million per native death in the campaigns of 1867 and between $1 million and $2 million per week in general defense of the frontiers.) Congress concluded after much debate that peace was preferable to extermination, and empowered a seven-man commission of four civilians and three military officers to negotiate with the tribes on behalf of the government, work to confine them to reservations, and if unsuccessful, raise a volunteer army of 4,000 men to move them by force.

=== Members ===
The members of the commission included:

- Nathaniel Green Taylor, former Methodist minister and commissioner of the Bureau of Indian Affairs
- John B. Henderson, US Senator, chairman of the United States Senate Committee on Indian Affairs, sponsor of the bill that authorized the commission
- Samuel F. Tappan, journalist, abolitionist, and Indian rights activist, former Lieutenant Colonel and Brevet Colonel of the 1st Colorado Volunteer Regiment and chair of the military investigation into the Sand Creek massacre
- John B. Sanborn, former major general, US Army, and former member of the commission organized by Alfred Sully to investigate Fetterman's defeat
- William Tecumseh Sherman, then lieutenant general, US Army, commanding the Division of the Missouri
- Alfred Terry, then brevetted as major general, US Army
- William S. Harney, then brevetted as major general, US Army
- Christopher C. Augur, major general, US Army, commander of the Department of the Platte, initially temporarily replaced Sherman when he was recalled to Washington D.C., but later became a regular member

Taylor, Tappan, Henderson, and Sanborn were explicitly named in the legislation which created the commission. From the army, the president appointed three officers, adding Sherman, Terry, and Harney, and later Augur.

Members of the Peace Commission

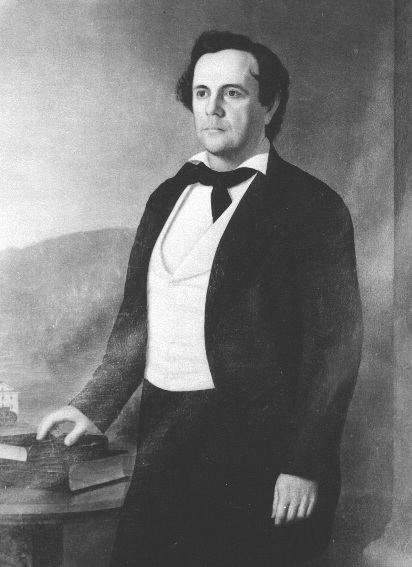
Taylor

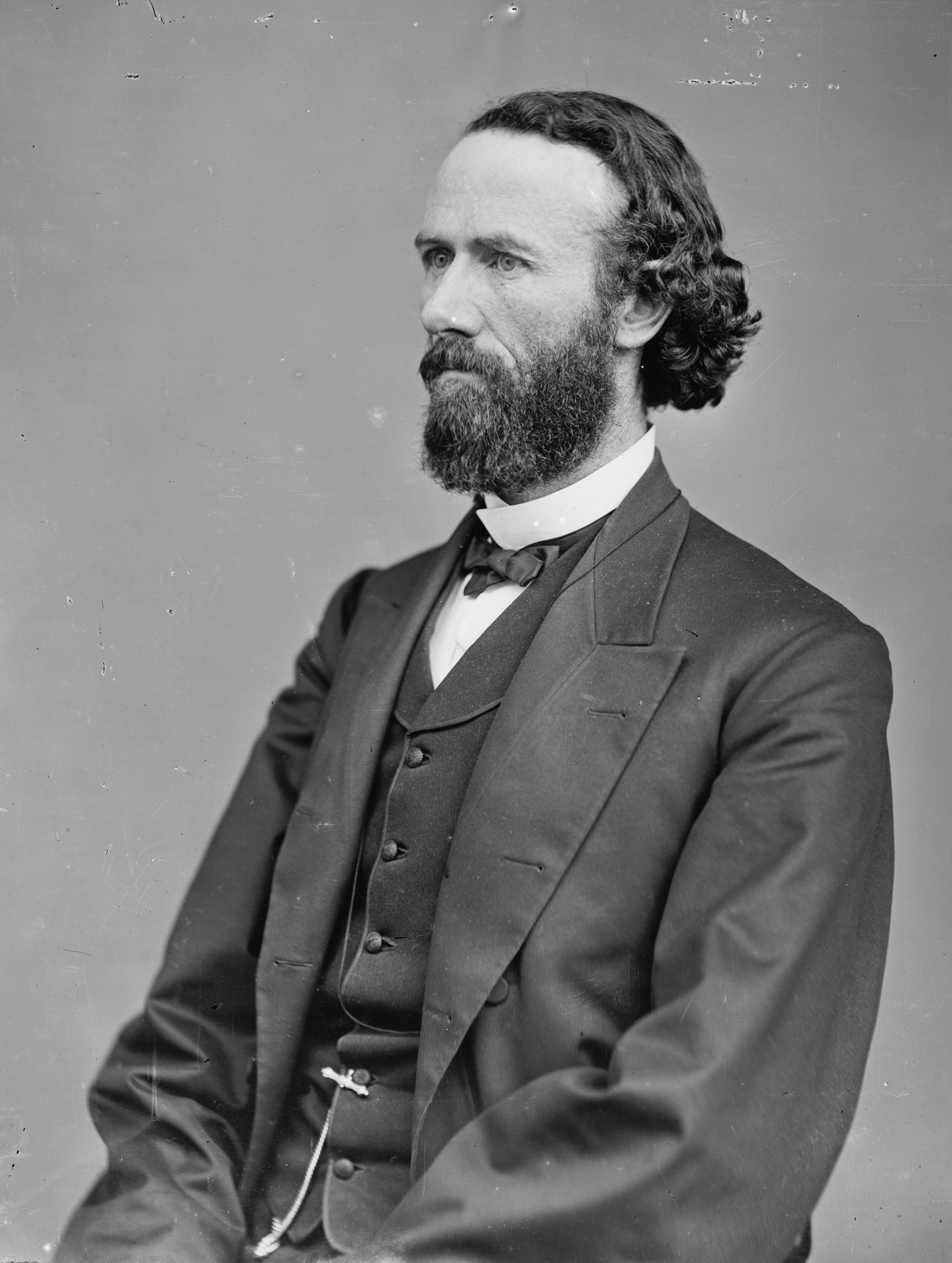
Henderson

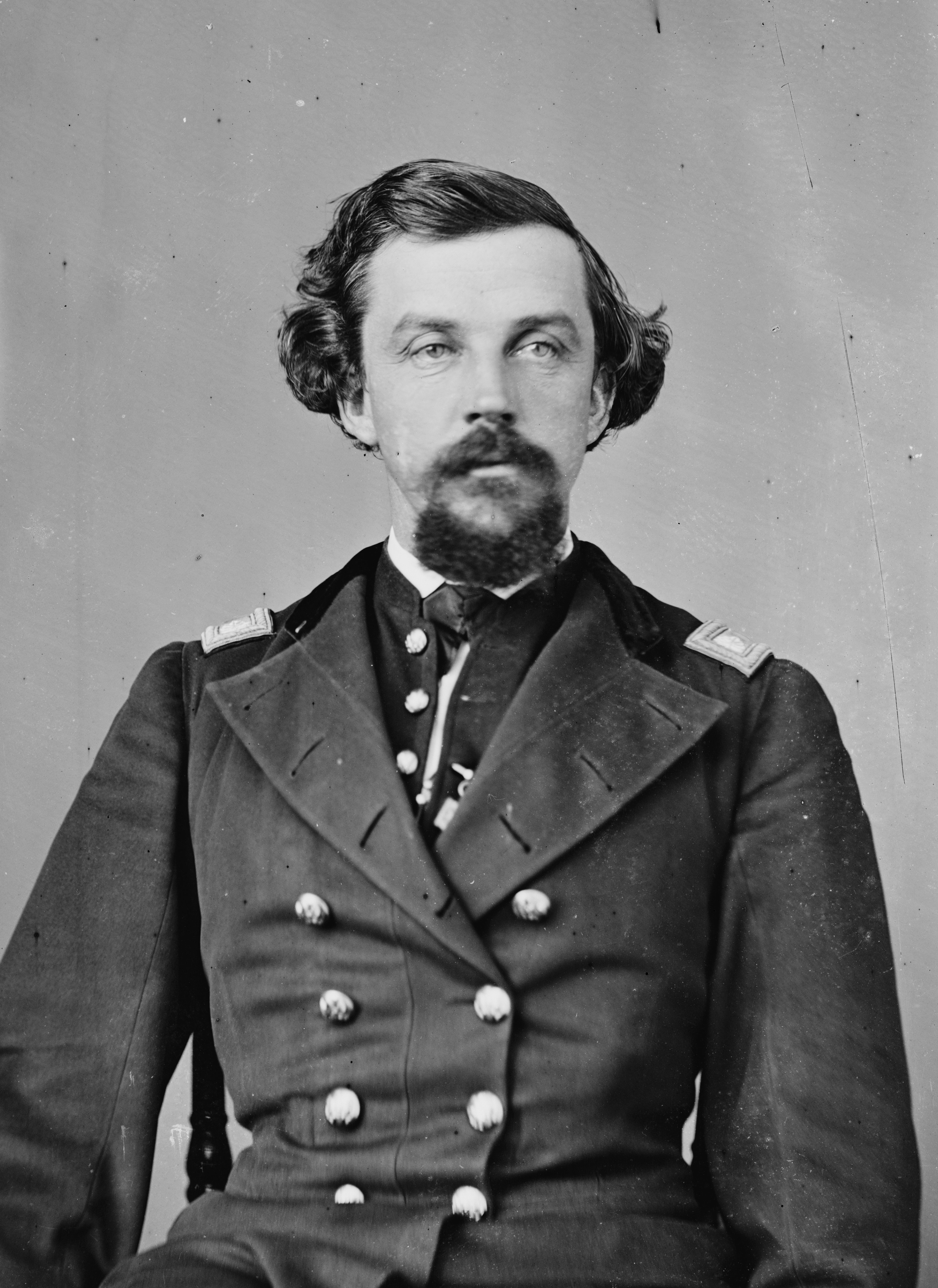
Tappan

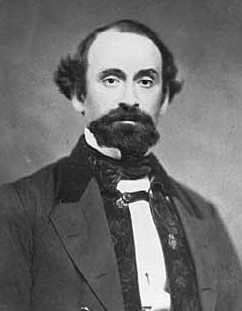
Sanborn

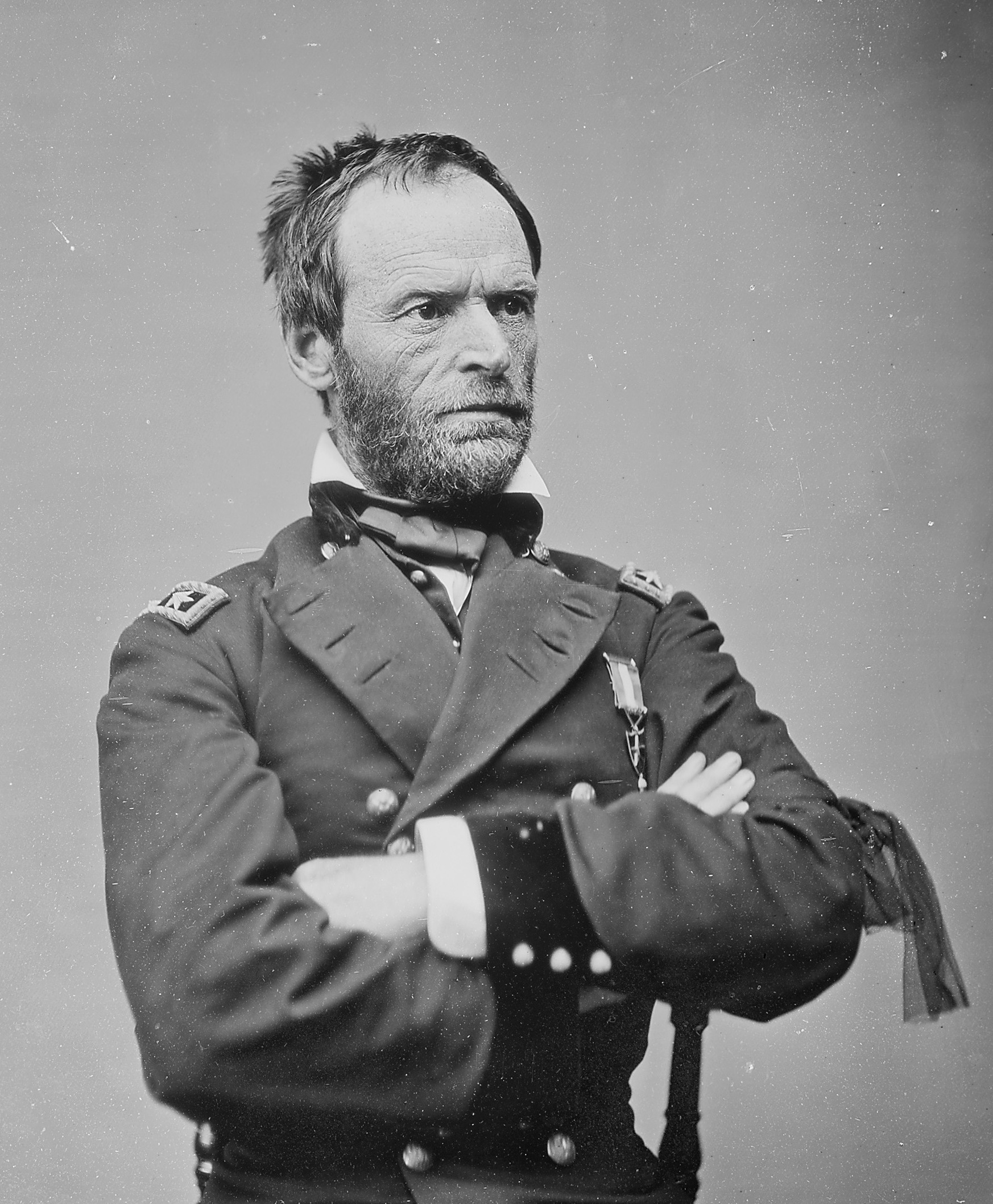
Sherman

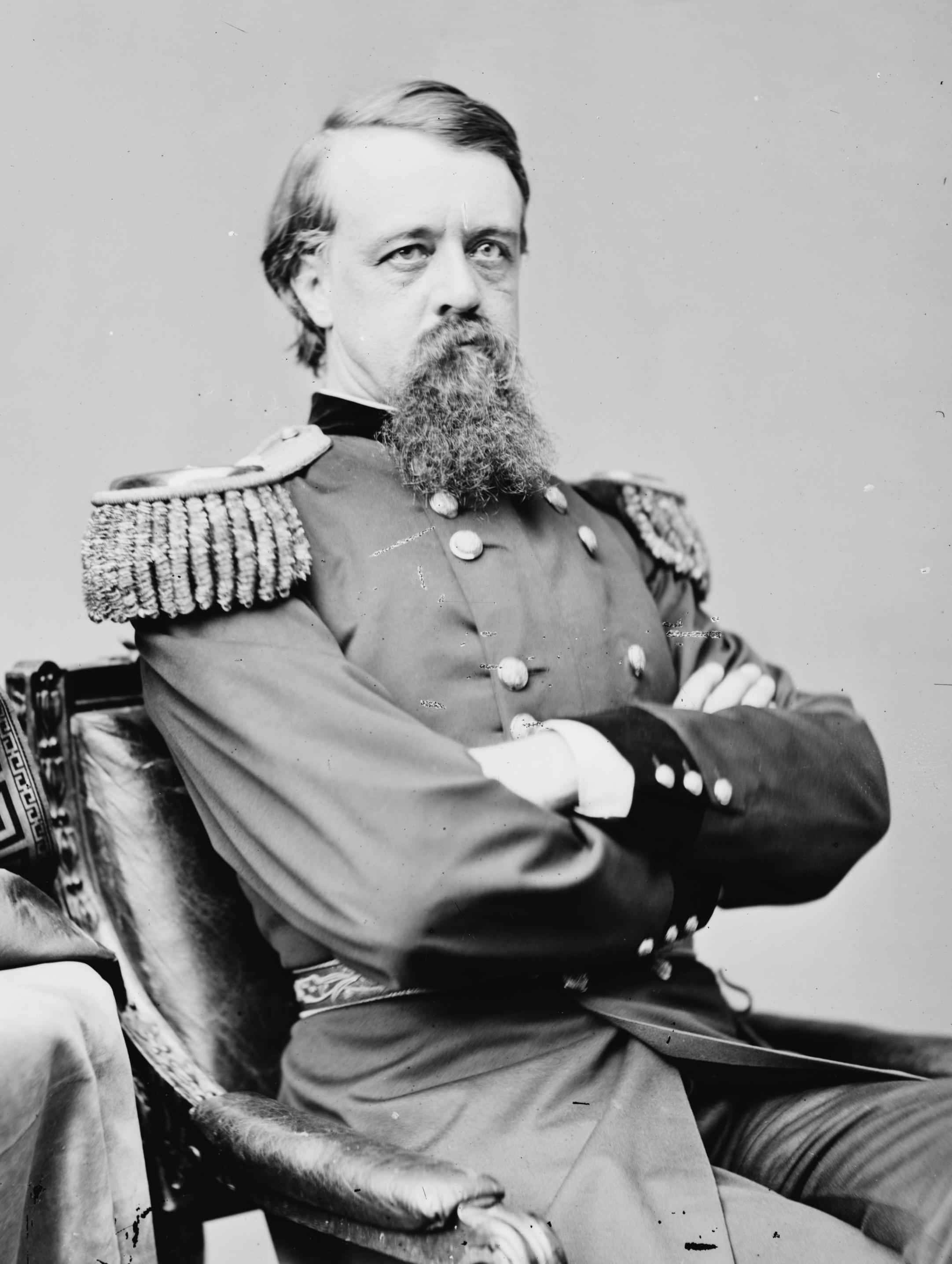
Terry

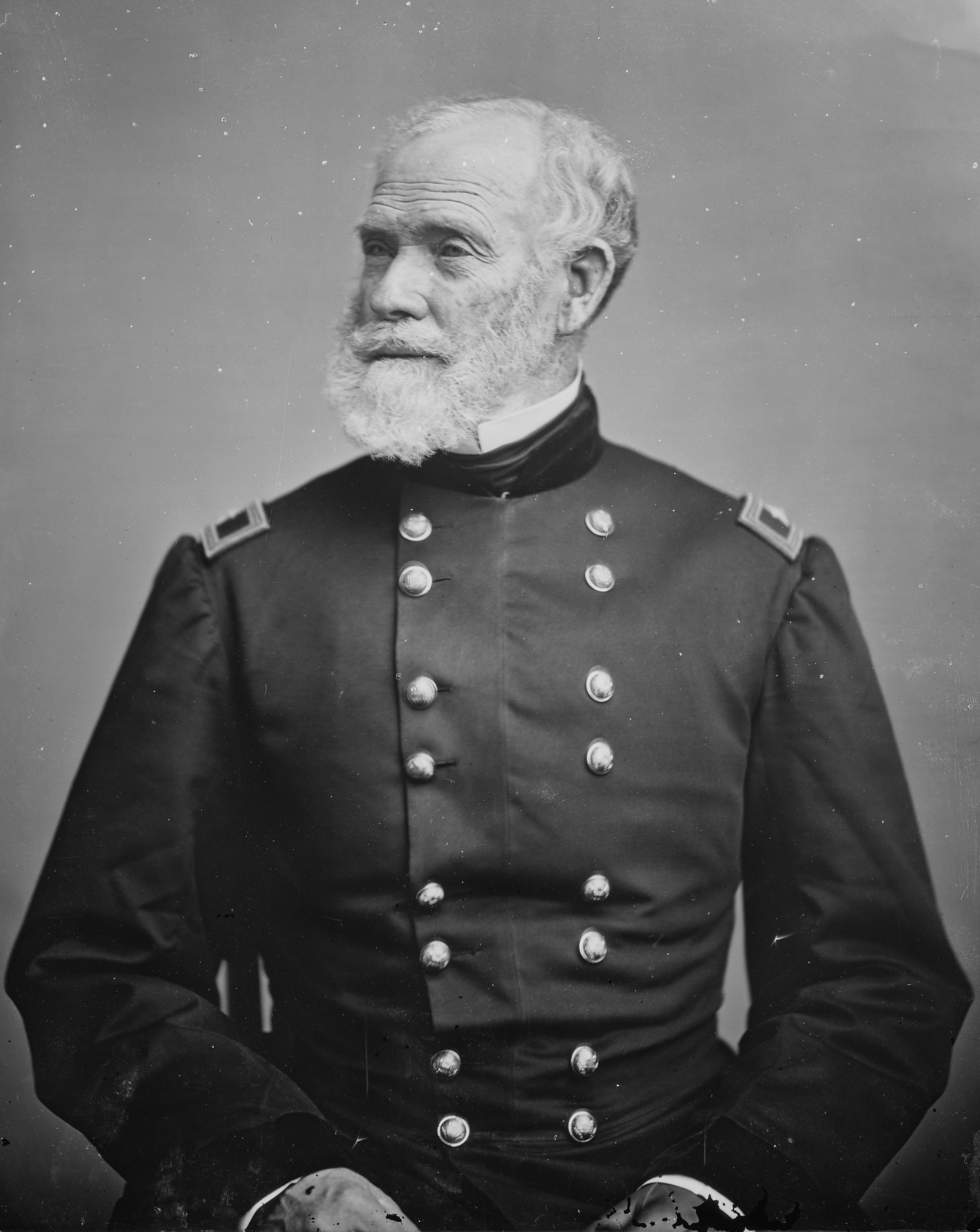
Harney

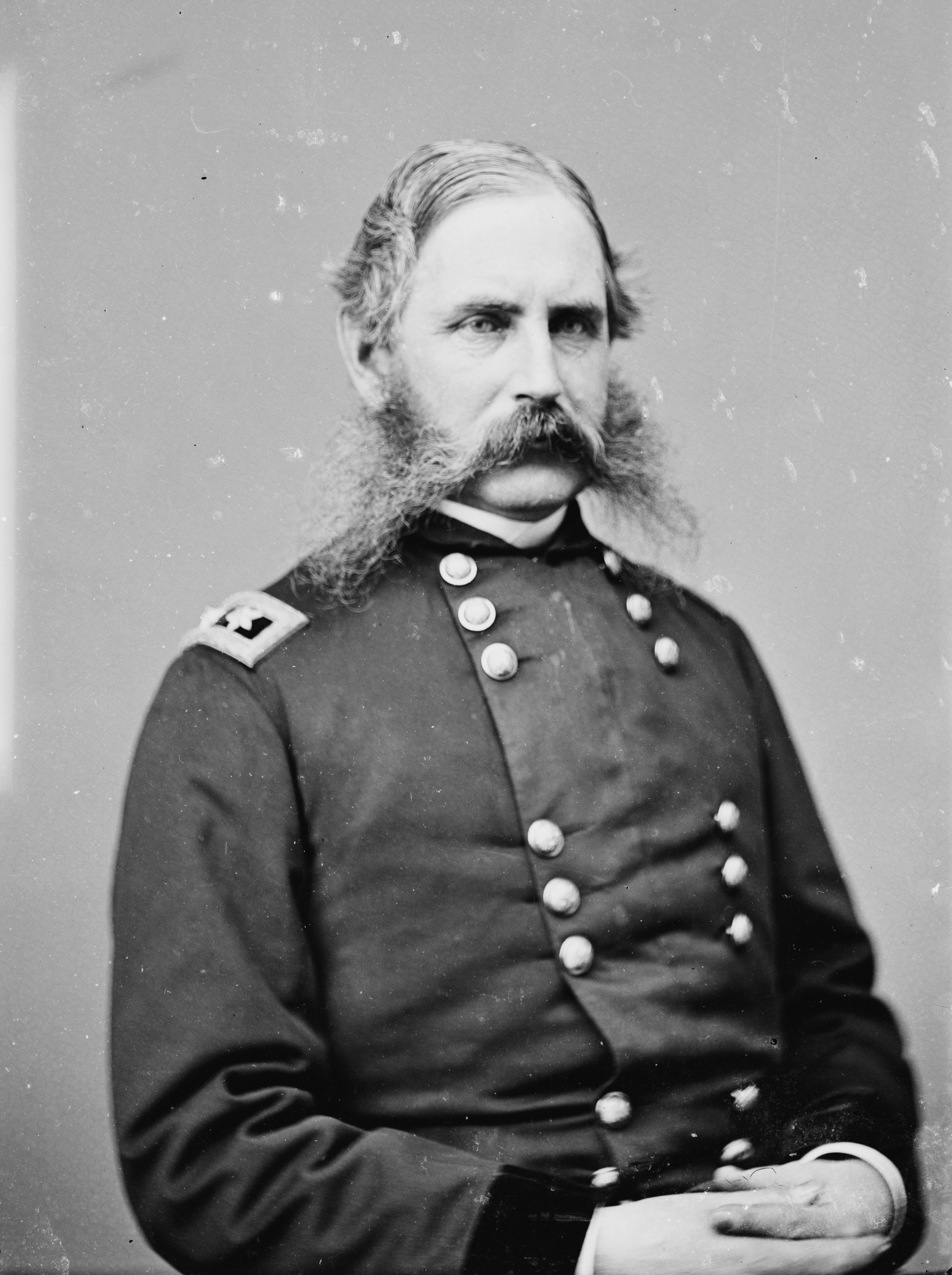
Augur

== Work ==
The commission met at St. Louis and directed the military and civilian forces under their collective command to begin gathering tribes at Fort Laramie in the north, and Fort Larned in the south. The commission then traveled westward. They conferred with civilian and military authorities at Fort Leavenworth, St. Germain has the commission meeting at Fort Sully although many of their meetings in late August 1867 actually took place aboard the river steamer "St. John" close to Fort Sully in the Dakota Territory. They did meet on August 31, 1867, with various Lakota at Fort Sully. Later that Fall they also met with Sioux and Cheyenne delegations at the new town of North Platte at the terminus of the Union Pacific Railroad near the North Platte River. These early meetings resulted in no formal agreements, and the commissioners made plans to return and negotiate further at Fort Laramie in November.

The members of the commission returned to St. Louis, before continuing to Fort Larned, where they arrived on October 12, 1867, and then continued with an escort of local chiefs on to Medicine Lodge River. The commission themselves had some 600 men and 1,200 animals of their own accompanying them. This included a press corps, two companies of the 7th Cavalry Regiment, and "an entourage of aides, bureaucrats, camp attendants, teamsters, cooks, interpreters, and other camp followers."

While en route to Medicine Lodge, Sherman was recalled to Washington D.C. and replaced by Christopher C. Augur.

=== Medicine Lodge Treaty ===
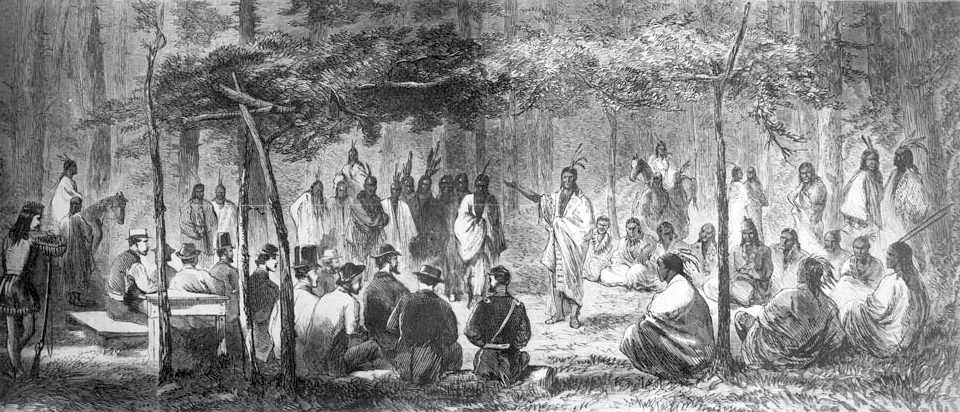
Harper's Weekly illustration of the negotiations at Medicine Lodge, 1867

Negotiations began on October 19, 1867, with the Comanche, Kiowa, Arapaho, and Kiowa-Apache at Medicine Lodge, where around 5,000 from the various tribes were encamped. Following two days of resistance to the proposition of leaving their land, (Note: Responding to the proposition, Kiowa Chief Satana questioned, "This building of homes for us is all nonsense. We don't want you to build any for us. We would all die. My country is small enough already. If you build us houses, the land will be smaller. Why do you insist on this?" Ten Bears similarly protested, "There is one thing which is not good in your speeches; that is, building us medicine houses. We don't want any. I want to live and die as I was brought up. I love the open prairie, and I wish you would not insist on putting us on a reservation.") treaties were signed on October 21, that moved the tribes to reservations in Oklahoma, promised a "token amount" of annual subsidies from the government, and contained various provisions designed to transition the tribes to a "foreign world of sedentary farming", for which the commissioners bestowed upon them goods and gifts worth tens of thousands of dollars.

On October 27, 500 warriors of the Cheyenne, who had been camped some 40 miles (64 km) away, arrived, and agreed to a treaty of similar provisions, creating and moving them to a reservation between the Arkansas and Cimarron rivers south of Kansas. Gifts were again distributed and negotiations concluded.

=== First visit to Fort Laramie and report ===
The commission departed immediately for North Platte and Fort Laramie in the hopes of negotiating with Red Cloud, who was leading an open revolt. Disappointingly, they found only the Crow, who were already well known for their friendly relations with whites. Before leaving in failure, they received communication from Red Cloud with assurances that once the army left the forts on the Bozeman Trail near the Powder River, in the heart of Sioux land, the ongoing war he was waging could be ended. They returned a message proposing a meeting in the following spring or summer. (Note: One source by Gump recounts of their trip in November, "When [Red Cloud] spurned them by not showing, Harney called for a military offensive, but Taylor's approach prevailed." Although Gross does not provide any additional details of what Harney's proposal might have been.) After the departure of the other Commissioners, Commissioner Tappan met in late November 1867 with Spotted Tail and other Brule Sioux chiefs.

The commissioners disbanded to return in December with a report for the government, which was submitted on January 7, 1868. In it they detailed their successful negotiations, blamed the current and recently concluded conflicts on whites, (Note: As Genetin-Pilawa summarized, the commission "blamed whites for instigating and intensifying the violence and warfare around Indian communities. [quoting the commission's report] 'Many bad men are found among the whites; they commit outrages despite all social restraints,' they wrote. It was not 'astonishing' they concluded, that Indians went to war; they were 'often compelled to do so'.") and urged congressional action on a number of issues. These included the ratification of the treaties of the prior year, and the creation of districts where the tribes could turn to agriculture, "barbarous dialects" could be "blotted out and the English language substituted," and government subsidies eventually withdrawn entirely. Here they envisaged that in a span of 25 years, the buffalo on which many tribes depended would be gone, the nomadic natives would be assimilated, tribal identity eliminated and replaced with "one homogeneous mass", and the commission could avert "another generation of savages". They looked forward to the coming year and negotiations with the Navajo, at the time imprisoned at Bosque Redondo, and with the Sioux with whom the government remained at war. (Note: The commission's first report favored the humanitarians of the group, with Sherman later saying "We did not favor the conclusion arrived at, but being out-voted, we had to sign the report")

=== Treaty of Fort Laramie ===
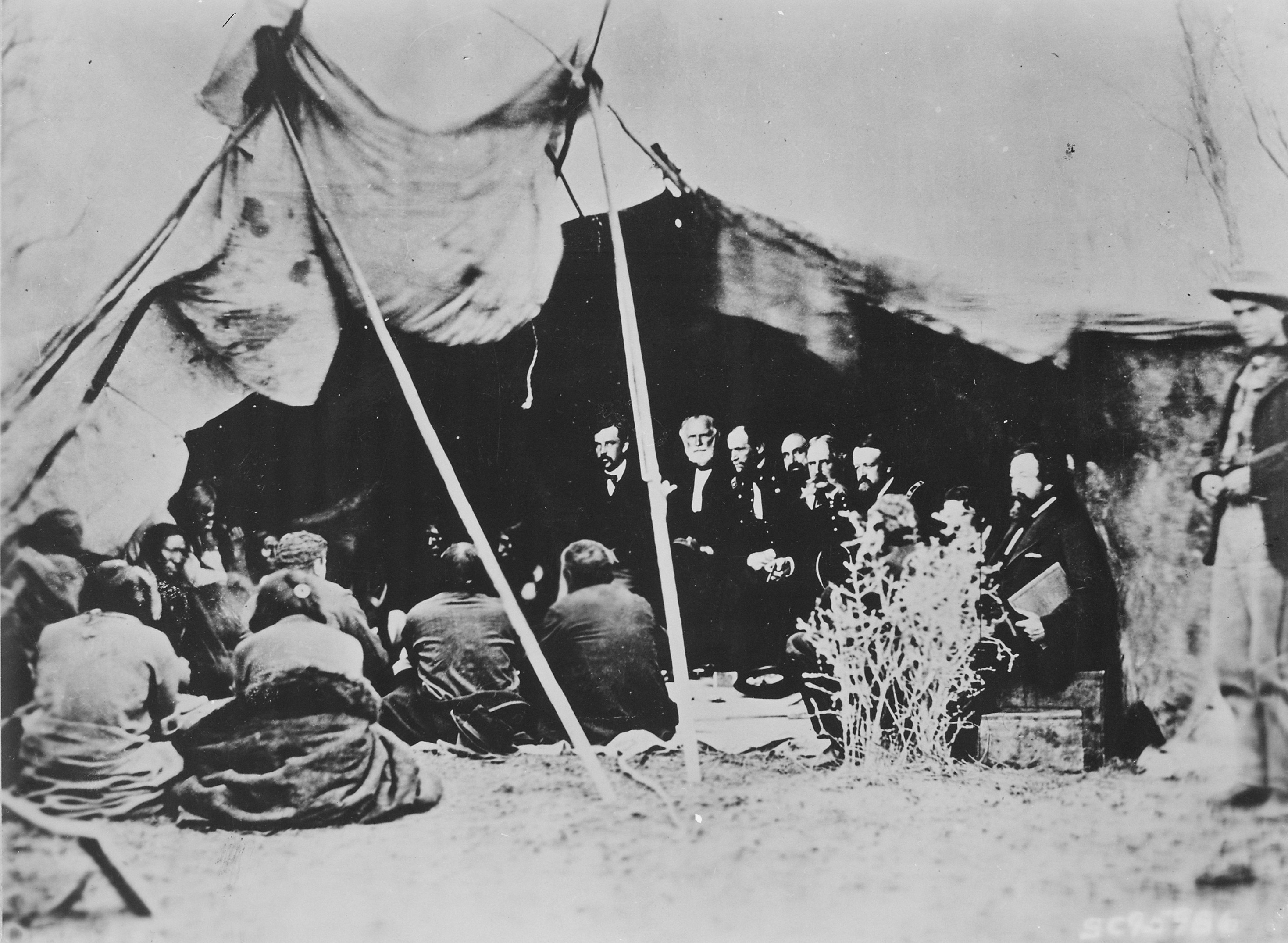
The commissioners in council with the chiefs at Fort Laramie, 1868

In the new year the commission sent out "chief-catchers" to gather Lakota leaders at Laramie. Ulysses S. Grant wrote to Sherman to prepare to abandon military posts on Sioux land, and acquiesce, for the first time in history, to Red Cloud's demands as a hostile native leader in the field. (Note: While acknowledging the historic nature of the acquiescence, St. Germain contends that this was due in no small part to the fact that the railroad had been completed elsewhere, providing a more convenient route to Montana than the contested Bozeman Trail. In her words, "in truth it was not much of a victory. It was simply that the railroad had made the battle obsolete.") The commission arrived in Omaha, Nebraska in April, and Sherman was again recalled to Washington D.C. to attend to the ongoing impeachment of Andrew Johnson.

At Laramie, Red Cloud proved absent, and negotiations began with the Brulé Lakota on April 13. (Note: Red Cloud belonged to the Oglala Lakota.) The commission agreed the government would abandon their military outposts, build additional Indian agencies in the area, and set aside land as "unceded Indian territory". The tribes agreed to a number of stipulations similar to those laid out at Medicine Lodge, including confinement to reservation, and incentives for the transition to farming. Throughout the summer a procession of leaders signed the treaty, including those of the Crow, Northern Cheyennes, and Northern Arapaho. Red Cloud himself did not, and sent word that when the forts were abandoned, he would only then come down from the mountains. After this was accomplished, Red Cloud and his troops rode down to the vacant forts, burned them to the ground. He too then arrived at Fort Laramie in October, negotiated for over a month, and finally signed on November 6, 1868.

The commission however, would not be there to meet Red Cloud. In May they departed Fort Laramie, leaving the finalization of the treaty under the care of the post commander there. Terry left for forts Randall and Sully. Augur left for Fort Bridger to treat with the Snake, Bannock and others. Sherman, now returned, along with Tappan left for Bosque Redondo and the Navajos. Only Harney and Sanborn remained initially before leaving to join Terry at Fort Sully, and then Fort Rice.

=== Treaty of Bosque Redondo ===
Sherman and Tappan arrived at Fort Sumner near Bosque Redondo on May 28, 1868. In 1864 thousands of Navajo had been forcibly relocated there in a 300 mi (480 km) march, following the scorched earth tactics of Kit Carson and James Henry Carleton, which had pushed many to the brink of starvation. On their way, some 3,000 died in what became known as the Navajo's Long Walk. Once they arrived at the camp, conditions proved squalid, and farming impractical. Their herds were raided by Comanche and their crops succumbed to drought, flood and pests. Forced to rely on government rations, many died of disease and starvation. Even with conditions as poor as they were, the project nonetheless incurred great expense to the government to maintain.

Sherman favored the removal of the Navajo to the Indian Territory in Oklahoma, while Tappan favored returning them to their homeland in the Four Corners region. Sherman failed to convince the Navajo, led by Barboncito, who resolved that "Without absolute force ... they would not remain here or immigrate further east."

The two commissioners eventually presented a treaty that would return the Navajo to their homeland, provide government subsidies, compel their children to attend school and learn English, and provide the now familiar equipment and incentives for a transition to agriculture. On June 18, 1868, the group of 8,000, accompanied by some 2,000 sheep and 1,000 horses set off at a pace of 12 miles (19 km) per day on their Long Walk Home to their ancestral lands.

=== Fort Bridger Treaty ===
At Fort Bridger in modern Wyoming, Augur met with the Shoshone and Bannock, and although they were at peace with the government at the time, negotiated a treaty signed on July 3, 1868, in order to "arrange matters that there may never hereafter be a cause of war between them". This moved the tribes to Fort Hall Indian Reservation and Wind River Indian Reservation, in addition to provisions that were "almost identical" to those other agreements already crafted by the commission.

=== Final report ===
In October the commissioners returned to Chicago. The agreements at Medicine Lodge had already begun to break down and Red Cloud had at this point not yet signed for his band of Lakota. Yet with Henderson busy with the ongoing impeachment proceedings for Andrew Johnson, the remaining seven commissioners set to filing their final report, published on October 9, 1868. (Note: As Prucha observes, with Henderson away, "only Taylor and Tappan were left to defend a conciliatory position. The rest had been convinced by the summer's warfare that military force was needed.") They recommended the government provide the promised supplies to the tribes who had relocated to reservations, and treat each treaty as being in full effect, regardless of whether they had been officially ratified by the Senate. They recommended the government cease recognizing the tribes as domestic dependent nations, make no more such treaties with them, and abrogate portions of the Medicine Lodge Treaty, now that renewed violence was underway. Finally, they recommended that "military force should be used to compel the removal into said reservations of all such Indians as may refuse to go," and that the Bureau of Indian Affairs be relocated from the Department of the Interior to the Department of War. (Note: This last recommendation was made "despite strong opposition from Commissioner Taylor".)

The commission disbanded on October 10, 1868. It was the last major commission of its kind.

== Treaty provisions ==
If we intend to have war with them, the [Bureau of Indian Affairs] should go to the Secretary of War. If we intend to have peace, it should be in the civil department. In our judgment, such wars are wholly unnecessary, and hoping that the government and the country will agree with us, we cannot now advise the change.
—First report of the Indian Peace Commission, January 1868

Resolved, That in the opinion of this commission the Bureau of Indian Affairs should be transferred from the Department of the Interior to the Deparement of War.
—Final report of the Indian Peace Commission, October 1868

=== Civilization ===
The commission, along with Congress which authorized it, were explicit in their desire to "civilize" native peoples. According to Eric Anderson, of Haskell Indian Nations University, the first of the commission's treaties at Medicine Lodge "marked a shift away from genocide to policies that we would today term 'ethnocide'".

As then Senator Samuel C. Pomeroy expressed his views at the time:

I believe, however, religiously, that the only ultimate solution of this whole question is, that the Indian shall take his place among other men and accept the march of civilization, as he must ultimately, or there is nothing except his destiny that awaits him, which is extinction."

In describing the tactics of Taylor as president of the commission, historian Francis Paul Prucha wrote that Taylor "epitomized the paternalistic outlook of Washington officialdom [and] sought the civilization of the Indians with a vengeance." Prucha described the January 1868 report of the commission as a "denunciatory tirade against the evils of the Indian system ... suffused with evangelical sentiments favoring the civilization of the Indians, their mingling with white citizens, and their ultimate absorption into white society." Of the treaties themselves, he wrote: "One needs only to read the treaties ... to see the strong thrust toward civilization that dominated the documents."

The treaties variously provided for grants of individually owned tracts of land for those who "desire to commence farming", up to $175 worth of "seeds and implements" per family over four years, and stipulations for the provision of farmers and other skilled workers from the government. The treaties of Bridger, Laramie, and Medicine Lodge included annual prizes of $500 for the 10 families who grew the best crops, and Laramie added, for each family who relocated to the reservation and commenced farming, "one good American cow, and one good well-broken pair of American oxen".

Much of the land set aside on reservations was not suitable for farming. Traditionalists among the tribes refused to farm, even when given equipment, and some threatened farming instructors when they arrived. Ultimately, many were unwilling to conform to the "views of the good life of English education and neat farms."

=== Appropriations ===
In what St. Germain describes as the "most basic" of the "critical omissions" in the commission's creation, Congress initially authorized funding for the negotiations themselves, but failed to appropriate any funding or provide guidance or limitations on government spending agreed to in the treaties. These included a variety of payments, from the provision of supplies, and the construction of buildings, to lump sum payments for tribes, and yearly cash payments to individuals. In May 1868, while in Washington, Sherman had asked Congress for $2 million in contingent funding for the treaties. He was given $500,000, of which $200,000 was given to Harney alone to be used for the Sioux.

Conflict within the government over this spending would largely be responsible for undoing the commission's work. In 1869, the proposed Indian Appropriations Act totaled $2,312,240 before funding for the various treaties was added, and $6,654,158 afterwards. Appropriations bills must originate from the House, but only the Senate holds the power to ratify treaties. The two chambers quarreled and failed to pass any version of the appropriations during that legislative session; disagreement over funding continued for several years. According to St. Germain, "Congress had created the commission but had no obligation to support or approve the action taken in its name, and few members would feel any compulsion to do so later."

=== "Bad men" clause ===
All the treaties negotiated by the Commission between 1867 and 1868 contained so-called "bad men" provisions, whereby the government agreed to reimburse tribes for damages caused by "bad men among the whites". However, such clauses failed to be enforced until 2009, when a young Sioux woman won the first and only "bad men" court case, earning a $600,000 award for damages in relation with a sexual assault.

== Mutual understanding ==
A number of authors have questioned the extent to which the various signatories may have understood what they were agreeing to in their respective treaties. Negotiations had to be conducted by translator, and at times through multiple translations. At Bosque Redondo, translators used English to Spanish to Navajo to express the commissioners's statements, moving, as Kessell described, from "a more abstract, mainly noun- and adjective-oriented language, to a literal verb-oriented language in the minds and mouths of vastly different people." As James Gump quotes historian John Gray, the Fort Laramie treaty was itself full of "gross contradictions" and, in his opinion, "it is inconceivable that any Indian was truthfully informed of all its provisions." Continuing to quote anthropologist Raymond DeMallie,

Perhaps the single most frustrating aspect of the entire history of treaty making was the inability of the two sides to communicate with one another meaningfully. Both whites and Indians used the councils to deliver speeches composed in advance. Specific objections or questions by Indians were rarely answered when they were raised, but were answered a day or more later in the course of lengthy speeches. Many questions went unanswered, and many objections were simply ignored.

According to Oman, the full contents of the Fort Laramie treaty were unknown to many until after Red Cloud returned from his trip to Washington D. C. years later. At Medicine Lodge, according to Colin Galloway, "It is difficult to believe the Cheyennes knew what they were getting into beyond agreeing to let the railroads through to secure peace." Moreover, in the final treaties signed there, the Kiowas, Comanches and Cheyennes all agreed to provisions they "expressly opposed during the treaty talks". In examining reservation boundaries negotiated during Bosque Redondo, Kessell describes the commissioners speaking of "artificial lines on maps, of parallels and meridians," while the Navajo spoke of "geographical features, of canyons, mountains and mesas," and all in a negotiation where Sherman, maps in hand, overestimated the size of the reservation by almost double.

There was also an incongruity in the fact that the government approached treaty making as a representative democracy, while the tribes made decisions through consensus, and although the chiefs had been appointed as signatories, they did not control those who were not a party to the negotiations themselves. According to historian Carolyn Ives Gilman of the National Museum of the American Indian, the commission "ascribed to Indian tribes a system of power that in fact did not exist ... The chiefs are looked on as mediators and councilors, people who may represent the tribe to outside entities, but who never have the authority to give orders or compel the obedience of other members."

== Aftermath and legacy ==
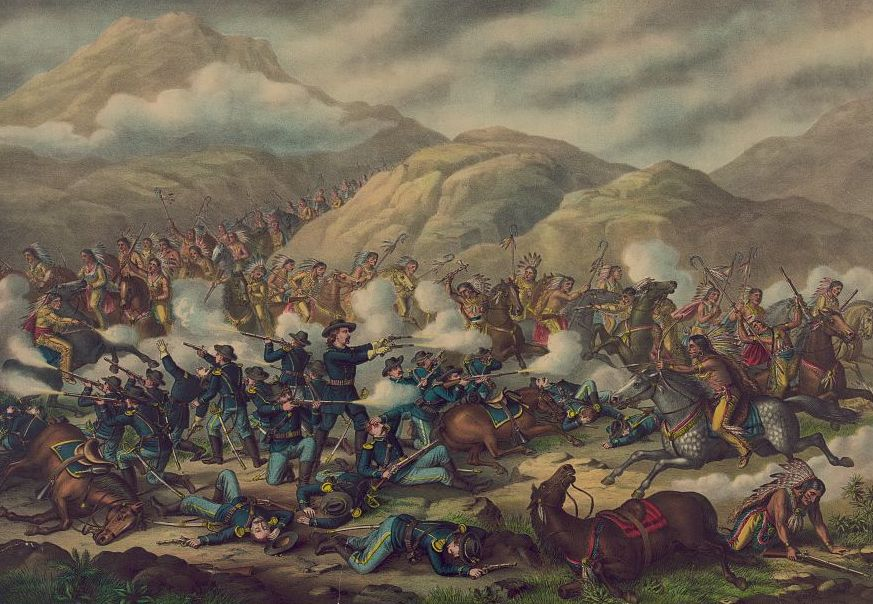
Illustration of Custer's defeat at the Battle of the Little Bighorn, after the failure of the second Treaty of Fort Laramie and the outbreak of the Great Sioux War

At the time it disbanded, the commission was widely seen as a failure, as violence had already returned to the Southern Plains, following the collapse of the agreements made at Medicine Lodge. In the following month, George Armstrong Custer fought the Cheyenne at the Battle of Washita River, and by 1876, would fight his final battle after open war again broke out with the Sioux, despite the agreement at Fort Laramie that all parties would forever cease hostilities. The second Treaty of Fort Laramie would eventually be modified three times by the Congress between 1876 and 1889, each time taking more of the 33,000,000 acres (13,000,000 ha) of land granted through the agreement with the commission, including unilaterally seizing the Black Hills in 1877.

The Medicine Lodge Treaty was ratified by Congress in 1868, but although signed, the tribes themselves never ratified it. Within a year, Congress withheld promised government subsidies, and Sherman worked to restrict hunting rights. A decade later, an oversight in the Fort Bridger Treaty helped spark the Bannock War.

Following negotiations at Bosque Redondo, the Navajo became unique as the only people to use a treaty to return to their homeland, a rare instance of indigenous Americans returning to their homeland at all. There they remained, and even expanded their holdings to become the largest such reservation in the nation. From that point forward, despite what historian Robert M. Utley described as "ample cause", the Navajo would never again make war against whites.

The Senate was slow to act on many treaties, rejected others, and others were withdrawn by the president prior to Senate approval. For those ratified, such as that at Bosque Redondo, provisions for benefits from the government went unfulfilled, some even into modern times. For those that were fulfilled, the government did so only after debate and delay, as was the case with Fort Laramie and the Sioux, where William S. Harney of his own accord, purchased and provided supplies for the tribes to last through the winter, and was then made to answer to Congress for his "unauthorized expenditures."

Some among the tribes returned to conducting raids on both whites and other natives, faced with hungry families in the absence of pledged government rations, at the same time that the tribal economies were being dismantled. The government also failed to successfully keep often predatory white settlers off the reservations as agreed to. The combination fueled public outrage at "a policy that seemed to feed and supply Indians who then went out and killed whites," and the driving force behind government policy became war against all those outside of reservations. Sherman, in his own 1868 annual report, resolved to "prosecute the war with vindictive earnestness against all hostile Indians, till they are obliterated or beg for mercy; and therefore all who want peace must get out of the theatre of war." (Note: For his part, John F. Marszalek assigns ulterior motives to Sherman's participation in the commission entirely, writing "Sherman expressed support for the commission's activities only because he knew they would lead to the failure of the peace policy and allow the government to use force again." Peter Cozzens describes his participation as a delaying tactic, to "dally along this year", so as to provide time for the army to be better prepared. Continuing, "Cooperating with meddlesome civilians was one thing, but Sherman was mortified to find himself appointed chairman of the Peace Commission, and he quickly passed the gavel to the commissioner of Indian affairs, Nathaniel G. Taylor." Although Sherman still did "most of the talking.")

=== End of treaties ===
In 1871, the House of Representatives attached a rider to the Indian Appropriations Act, ending the practice of treaty making with tribes, and designating native people individually as legal wards of the federal government. Congressional efforts to reduce the size of Medicine Lodge reservations eventually resulted in the case of Lone Wolf v. Hitchcock, wherein the Supreme Court ruled in 1903 that "Congress had the right to break or rewrite treaties between the United States and Native American tribes however the lawmakers saw fit." According to Prucha:

[A]t the end of the nineteenth century and early in the twentieth, special commissions, new laws, and Supreme Court decisions made clear that treaty provisions, once considered sacred, need no longer be adhered to ... The treaty system had deteriorated to the point of collapse.

As Oman summarized, the commission did successfully conclude a number of negotiations, their treaty at Fort Laramie effectively ended Red Cloud's War, and they had a large impact on federal Indian policy, "Yet, despite these accomplishments ... instead of initiating an era of peace, the commission commenced a decade of war and bloodshed throughout the Plains."

== See also ==
- American Indian Wars, collective name for wars fought against Native Americans
- English-only movement, US political movement for the use of only the English language
- Indian removal, the forced migration of Native Americans throughout the 19th Century
- List of United States treaties, articles on treaties to which the US was a party
- Numbered Treaties, a series of 11 treaties signed between First Nations peoples, and Canada
- Outline of United States federal Indian law and policy
