= Bad men clause =

Legal section in American tribal treaties

A bad men clause is a clause in treaties signed between the United States and participating Native American tribes that states, if "bad men among the whites, or among other people subject to the authority of the United States" committed crimes against the tribes, that the United States would arrest and punish bad men involved while also reimbursing individuals affected by bad men. Though the clause has rarely been enforced, it remains an applicable way for tribes that signed treaties to seek justice for crimes committed against them by citizens of the United States.

== History ==
Bad men provisions would appear in nine such treaties with various tribes between 1867 and 1868. All of the Great Peace Commission treaties included nearly-identical Bad Men Clauses.

The Navajo Treaty of 1868 allowed the Navajo people to return to parts of their home lands from internment at Fort Sumner, NM and established the initial boundaries of the Navajo Nation. Article I of this treaty is a bad men clause, distinguished from that of the Sioux treaty and other Great Peace Commission treaties by its forfeiture clause.

The Treaty of Fort Laramie of 1868 was an agreement between the United States and the Oglala, Miniconjou, and Brulé bands of Lakota people, Yanktonai Dakota and Arapaho Nation, following the failure of the first Fort Laramie treaty (signed in 1851). The first article in the treaty holds a bad men clause that requires the US to prosecute and punish white settlers who commit crimes against the Sioux. In practice, the "bad men among the whites" clause was seldom enforced.

=== Legal usage ===
The first plaintiff to win a trial case on the provision did so in 2009, based on the 1868 Fort Laramie treaty. The plaintiff was a female Native American woman who was sexually assaulted by an Army recruiter. In 2008, a police officer of the Rosebud Sioux Indian Reservation arrested a female minor accused of underaged drinking; the officer reportedly sexually assaulted and took compromising photos of the girl. The officer pleaded guilty and was sentenced to two years in jail, though a lawsuit against the United States government by the minor's family, which was seeking "future medical, rehabilitative, and psychological counseling, treatment, and therapy", was thrown out since the girl lived "outside the boundaries of the reservation recognized by the Treaty".

In 2015, the Lower Brule Indian Reservation invoked the Treaty of Fort Laramie of 1868 against TransCanada Corp. for its construction of the Keystone XL, with the tribe stating "presence of the Keystone XL Pipeline is hazardous to both the land and its inhabitants". With the expansion of man camps in Canada and the United States, some have suggested the use of bad men clauses to be invoked when sexual violence is used against Native American victims.
