= June Brooks =

American businesswoman

- Born: June 24, 1924; Ardmore, Oklahoma
- Died: August 29, 2010 (aged 86); Ardmore, Oklahoma
- Occupations: oil and gas entrepreneur and lobbyist
- Years active: 1970-1990

June Brooks (1924–2010) was an Oklahoma businesswoman, speaker and promoter of the oil and gas industry. She advocated for energy independence and spoke throughout the world on responsible energy development. She won numerous awards, including the Distinguished Service from both the Oklahoma Petroleum Council and the American Association of Professional Landmen, as well as being honored as an Outstanding Woman of Energy from the Association of Women in Energy and one of the inaugural inductees into the Oklahoma Women's Hall of Fame.

== Biography ==
June Brooks was born on June 24, 1924, in Ardmore, Oklahoma, to Lillian Eva (née Berry) and Major McKinley Brooks. She went to university studying at both the University of Oklahoma and North Texas State Teachers College. At North Texas, she met her future husband and after they married, she raised three children. In her early 50s, she was divorced and turned to public speaking on behalf of the oil and gas industry to make a living for her family. She established June Brooks Oil and Gas Company and served on the Interstate Oil Compact Commission in the 1970s. In 1975, she attended the World Petroleum Congress in Tokyo and was the only woman present. The conference strengthened her belief in energy independence and she became a vocal advocate, traveling throughout the world speaking for responsible development of the industry.

She was a member of the American Association of Professional Landmen and in 1978 received a Distinguished Service Award from them. She also spoke on behalf of Women in Energy and was honored by them with the 1980 Woman of Achievement in Energy award. Between 1978 and 1982 she received multiple awards from the Oklahoma Petroleum Council Speakers Bureau and in 1982, was one of the inaugural inductees into the Oklahoma Women's Hall of Fame. Brooks continued lobbying on behalf of the oil and gas industry throughout the 1980s, urging industry officials to become politically involved, write their congress members and the president of the United States in protest of moratoriums on exploration.

Brooks continued to be honored after retirement, with such honors as a Lifetime Achievement Award from the International Energy Advocates in 2005, a A Salute to Oklahoma's Energy Past by Oklahoma's Energy Advocates in 2007 and inclusion in a book, Astronauts, Athlete & Ambassadors, Oklahoma Women from 1950 to 2007, published as part of Oklahoma's centennial. Brooks died on August 29, 2010, in Ardmore, Oklahoma.

== Sources ==
- "American Gas Association Monthly". 62. Easton, Pennsylvania: American Gas Association. 1980.
- "The Interstate Oil & Gas Compact & Committee Bulletin". 6. Oklahoma City, Oklahoma: Interstate Oil Compact Commission. 1992.
- "The Landman". 32. Ft. Worth, Texas: American Association of Petroleum Landmen. 1987.
