= American Association of Professional Landmen =

American organization for petroleum landmen

- Abbreviation: AAPL
- Formation: 1959; 67 years ago
- Founded at: Oklahoma City, Oklahoma, US
- Type: Professional association
- Purpose: To promote the highest standards and ethics of performance for all land professionals and to encourage sound stewardship of all energy and mineral resources.
- Location(s): 800 Fournier Street, Fort Worth, Texas
- Region served: North America
- Products: Certification; Member Mark identification
- Services: Education; Professional development
- Fields: Legal; Geology; Engineering
- Members: 12,000
- Publication: The Landman
- Website: landman.org
- Formerly called: American Association of Petroleum Landmen

The American Association of Professional Landmen (AAPL), previously called the American Association of Petroleum Landmen, is a professional organization in the United States that unites approximately 12,000 landmen and land-related professionals in North America through professional development and service.

== History ==
In November 1954, nineteen landmen who were members of the National Oil Scouts and Landmen's Association met in Oklahoma City, Oklahoma, to establish the American Association of Petroleum Landmen (AAPL). It was created as a professional organization for landmen and other land-related fields. George F. Brown of Sun Oil Company was chosen as the association's first chairman.

AAPL held its first annual meeting in Fort Worth, Texas, in April 1955. At the time, the association already had 831 members from 23 states.

AAPL is now called the Association of Professional Landmen. Its mission is to promote performance standards for all land professionals, advance their stature, and encourage sound stewardship of energy and mineral resources. It had some 12,000 members.

AAPL's national headquarters are at 800 Fournier Street in Fort Worth, Texas. Its publication is The Landman.

== Activities ==
AAPL was founded and is the general manager of the American Prospect Expo, attended by 17,000 energy professionals each year. It also presents the Pioneer Award to individuals who make contributions to the field.

The AAPL provides curriculum guidance and program support for approved energy management programs and has accredited ten programs at universities in the United States and Canada. The association has an educational foundation and awards scholarships to undergraduate and graduate students who are studying natural resources management at these colleges schools.

The association started a voluntary certification program in June 1979. The AAPL provides three levels of certification to attest to a landman's knowledge and expertise. A Registered Landman, the initial certification, identifies someone with a fundamental knowledge of the land industry. The Registered Professional Landman certification identifies someone who has professional experience as a landman. The Certified Professional Landman has demonstrated a comprehensive level of professional experience and competency in the land business.

== Notable members ==
- June Brooks, businesswoman, speaker and promoter of the oil and gas industry
- Robert Mosbacher, United States Secretary of Commerce

== See also ==
- American Association of Petroleum Geologists
- List of industry trade groups in the United States
- Independent Petroleum Association of America
- Independent Petroleum Association of Mountain States
- Society of Exploration Geophysicists
