= Landman (oil worker) =

Professional title

A landman or "petroleum landman" is an individual who performs various land and mineral related services for oil and gas exploration companies, particularly in the US. According to American Association of Professional Landmen (AAPL), these services include but are not limited to: negotiating for the acquisition or divestiture of mineral rights; negotiating business agreements that provide for the exploration and/or development of minerals; determining ownership in minerals through the research of public and private records; reviewing the status of title, curing title defects and otherwise reducing title risk associated with ownership in minerals; managing rights and/or obligations derived from ownership of interests in minerals; and unitizing or pooling of interests in minerals.

== Characteristics ==
Since the services provided by the landman to the oil and gas exploration industry and other industries are so varied it is not uncommon for a landman to specialize in several different aspects of the profession at the same time. The term "landman" can also be interchanged with "land manager".

Numerous other industries, in addition to the petroleum industry, often require the skills and expertise of the landman, one of which is the wind industry. Wind development requires the locating of surface sites for turbines, determining surface ownership, negotiating lease agreements, and has many other similar duties performed by the petroleum landman. Telecommunications, pipeline, power, and transportation projects, linear in nature, are generally right-of-way (ROW) projects and are usually staffed by ROW agents. The terms "landman" and "right-of-way agent" are often used interchangeably; however, their duties often vary significantly. Landmen typically deal with site-specific projects (drill site) and leases, whereas ROW agents deal with linear corridor projects that can cross the interstate and usually involve easement conveyance.

Although the duties of landmen can vary drastically depending on this situation, there are 2 basic types: in-house and field. An in-house landman works directly for the oil and gas company as an employee, usually in their land department. They are likely to be involved in trades with other operators, negotiating trade participation, and joint operating agreements. A field landman is an independent contractor that interfaces with in-house landmen. They are typically hired by a broker and represent the landowner to the oil company, and the oil company to the landowner.

A particular degree is often not required of someone interested in becoming a landman, though it is favored. Few universities offer a petroleum land management degree but Western Colorado University "Western", the University of Oklahoma, the University of Tulsa, the University of Louisiana Lafayette, Texas Tech University, the University of Wyoming, and the University of Calgary are among those that do. The first and largest petroleum land management program was created in 1958 at the University of Oklahoma. It has since been re-branded as the "Energy Management Program". The AACSB International Southwestern Business Deans Association honored the program with The Most Innovative in Excellence Award for Curriculum Design.

Someone interested in becoming a landman without obtaining a degree might go to a county courthouse and approach landmen researching in the recorder's office or records room. No experience is needed to take photos of books, and offering this service can be an entry point into the career. However, attempting to "shadow" a landman in an unfamiliar courthouse may lead to suspicion of poaching areas from other companies and exclusion from employment in the sector that county. Some companies looking hire and train landmen with no experience in the field.

Compensation or salary varies and is dependent on many factors such as experience, geographic location, and the number of qualified landmen available in a given area. Many lawyers are practicing landmen and landmen/oil and gas attorneys. Due to the collapse in energy prices in the late 1980s which lasted for nearly two decades, into the early 2000s, most landmen who survived were retiring and most universities and colleges that offered petroleum land management degrees no longer did so. The resulting attrition combined with the spike in energy prices in the mid-2000s reversed the trends of earlier years and created a significant shortage of available landmen. The subsequent global financial collapse that began in 2008 once again reversed the boom and employment opportunities will likely continue their cyclical nature for years to come.

== American Association of Professional Landmen ==
The American Association of Professional Landmen (AAPL) (until 2010 "American Association of Petroleum Landmen") is an organization of professional landmen, who agree to a standard code of ethics, a mission statement and other policies. The AAPL offers certifications recognized throughout the industry as indicators of competency, proficiency, and professionalism. AAPL offers three certifications that are proven to enhance a member's credibility in the industry and to increase earning potential for landmen.

- Registered Landman (RL) – The initial level of certification, RL certification signifies a fundamental knowledge of the land industry as well as a landman's commitment to furthering their education. This certification level requires the applicant to be sponsored by one RPL and complete a "take home" test with a passing grade, in addition to various experiential requirements and a fee.
- Registered Professional Landman (RPL) – The mid-level designation offered by AAPL, RPL certification distinguishes a landman as knowledgeable, experienced, and professional. This certification level requires the applicant to be sponsored by three CPL certified individuals and complete a comprehensive proctored test, in addition to various experiential requirements and a fee.
- Certified Professional Landman (CPL) – The highest designation offered in the energy management industry, CPL certification is the standard by which landmen demonstrate their comprehensive competence, proficiency, and professionalism in the landman field. This certification level requires the applicant to be sponsored by three CPL certified individuals and complete a comprehensive proctored test, in addition to various experiential requirements and a fee.

== Notable landmen ==
Individuals who began their career or worked as a landman include:

- George W. Bush, former United States president
- Aubrey McClendon, former CEO of Chesapeake Energy
- T. Boone Pickens, The father of oil tycoon
- Jim Flores, billionaire and former CEO of Freeport-McMoRan
- Tom L. Ward, former CEO of SandRidge Energy
- Cody Campbell, billionaire and co-CEO of Double Eagle Holdings, and also a major Texas Tech athletics booster

=== Fictional ===
Actor Frank Wilcox played the fictional landman John Brewster on the television series The Beverly Hillbillies in the early 1960s. He was a landman for "The Tulsa Oil Company" who secured the lease for Jed Clampett's acreage and later got Jed to serve on its board of directors.

The 2024 streaming series Landman, written by Taylor Sheridan and starring Billy Bob Thornton, dramatizes the role of the landman in the modern oil industry.

== See also ==
- Energy law
- Wildcatter
