= Workforce housing =

Housing for low-income households near workplace

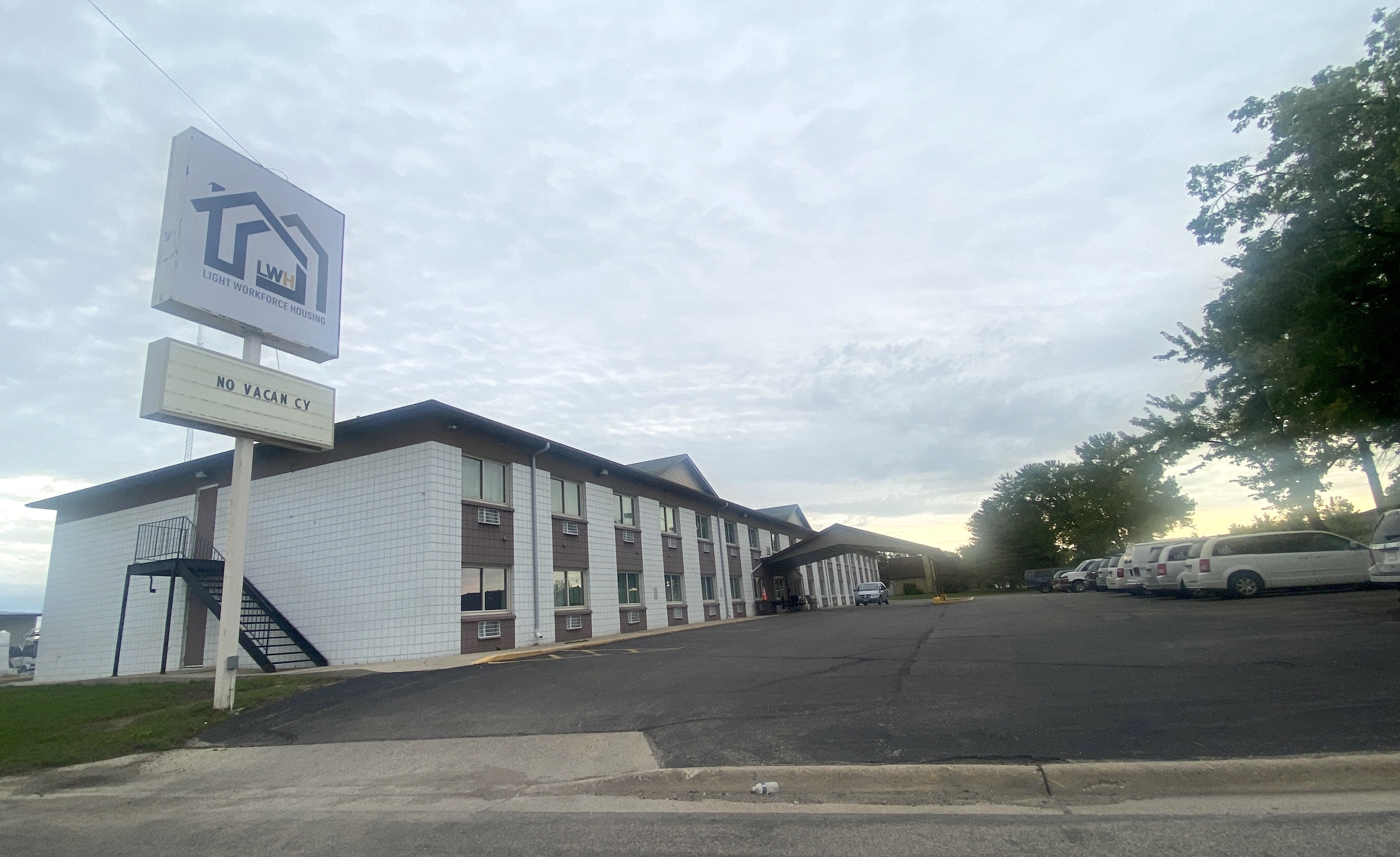
Workforce housing in Moorhead, Minnesota

Workforce housing is a term that is increasingly used by planners, governments, and organizations concerned with housing policy or advocacy. It is gaining cachet with realtors, developers and lenders. Workforce housing can refer to any form of housing, including ownership of single or multi-family homes, as well as occupation of rental units. Workforce housing is generally understood to mean affordable housing for households with earned income that is insufficient to secure quality housing in reasonable proximity to the workplace.

== Overview ==
Consideration of workforce housing includes these four principal factors:

Workforce

The term "workforce" is meant to connote those who are gainfully employed, a group of people who are not typically understood to be the target of affordable housing programs. Workforce housing, then, implies an altered or expanded understanding of affordable housing. Workforce housing is commonly targeted at "essential workers" in a community i.e. police officers, firemen, teachers, nurses, medical personnel. Some communities define "essential" more broadly to include service workers, as in the case of resort communities where one finds high real estate costs and a high number of low-paying service jobs essential to the local economy. Workforce housing may be targeted more generally at certain income levels regardless of type of employment, with definitions ranging from 50% to 120% of Area Median Income (AMI).

Affordability

Mortgage lenders typically impose a limit of 28% to 36% of household income allowable for principal, interest, taxes and insurance (PITI). Pricing calculations aimed at renters, who represent approximately one third of US households, define a desirable workforce housing cost as at or below 30% of household income. Affordability is a function of the relationship between one's income and the housing costs of the area, which leads to variation in the percentage of AMI that may be used to describe people who might need workforce housing.

Proximity

Most appropriately, "workforce housing" is located in or near employment centers. The expanding distance between gainful employment and housing made affordable by the income it provides has caused people to seek housing on the periphery of settled areas. This is cited as a contributor to urban sprawl, typified by traffic congestion, lengthy commutes, convenience stores and strip retail centers, and the rapid consumption of open space due to the building of new homes taking place at the outer edges of metropolitan areas where land is typically cheaper. While prevalent in US metropolitan areas, workforce housing issues may arise anywhere that land values or other restrictions on creation or availability of quality affordable housing units are constrained by zoning, market forces or physical boundaries.

Quality and supply

In recent decades, federal programs have focused on providing housing subsidy or vouchers, or building and maintaining public housing projects for low income households. Housing affordability for all others has been supported mainly through programs for home buyers, especially through mortgage financing. Whether seeking to rent or to buy, in areas facing an identified shortage of workforce housing, such units as can be found in close proximity to workplaces are often of poor quality. New housing built during the economic boom has included low numbers of affordable units, affordable units are often means-tested to exclude all but the poorest residents, and the less expensive housing tends to be built at a distance where land is cheaper. Proximity to work often means a tradeoff in quality of housing stock, school quality, personal safety. In real terms, living in low quality housing or marginal neighborhoods is a tradeoff between access to income and access to resources such as rising home equity or quality education.

== History ==
The concept of workforce housing has its early roots in the ski towns of Telluride and Aspen, Colorado. In 1974, in response to locals not being able to purchase homes due to the disparity between wages and the cost of homes and land rising sharply due to buyers from New York and Hollywood, a conference was organized at the Aspen Institute. In Aspen a plan was developed to create a secondary and separate "local worker" housing market which was based on local wages and affordability. One standard tool invented to create affordably priced homes for local workers that would stay affordable for future generations was a deed restriction, which in its most simple form states that to qualify for purchasing a home the applicant must live in the community, not own another home in the community, must work essentially full-time and must have lived in the community for a minimum period of time. Also, the owner can only sell the home to someone that meets the same criteria. Later provisions added over the years of "trial and error" include income restrictions to qualify, and capped rates on the amount of profit an owner is allowed to make in order to guarantees that the home will remain affordable forever. Three per cent per annum has been a justifiable number over the years.

The workforce housing problem seemed to be an anomaly in the ski resorts, made worse due to limited land for development due to mountains and federally owned land, which made "sprawling" unrealistic. Instead, it seems to have been a precursor to the problems now facing vacation communities and metropolitan areas all around the country and the world. In the early 2000s record low mortgage interest rates spurred a nationwide surge in housing demand. Record housing construction and record housing prices in many communities drove land costs higher. Construction materials and labor costs, propelled by disastrous hurricanes in 2004 and 2005 that damaged or destroyed hundreds of thousands of homes in Florida and on the Gulf Coast, amplified the problem to create a critical dilemma: in many communities, average income households cannot afford a median-priced home. For a while, the low interest rates and availability of creative financing options bridged the gap between housing costs and income for some households, enabling people to obtain mortgages that consumed more than 30% of their income or to use rising equity in their home to compensate for the affordability gap. The subprime mortgage crisis and current economic downturn raise questions as to the ability financing tools and private developers to effectively solve current or future affordable housing shortages.

Housing has played an important role in economic advancement and the growth of America's middle class. Federal housing policy has at times in the past created programs to assist the population currently targeted for workforce housing. For instance, after World War II the needs of returning veterans and the baby boom led to the G.I. Bill which included provisions for favorable mortgage terms and fueled suburban development, creating affordable home ownership opportunities for a generation of Americans. Public housing projects also provided rental housing to many urban families. In later decades means-testing, white flight, and mismanagement would change the nature and perception of public housing, but in mid-century America they were still providing quality, affordable housing to thousands of working and middle-class families.

== Study and policy ==
Systems like original Aspen scheme have not proliferated. However, the issue of workforce housing continues to affect non-metropolitan communities, particularly resort communities where one finds the acute effects of the triple impact of high land values, land limited by geographic features (i.e. coastline or mountains) and a prevalence of lower paying service-sector employment. Currently, the majority of advocacy and policy activity is centered on metropolitan areas with housing costs higher than the national average.

The term "workforce housing" is appearing in policy discussions at national and state levels. While typically defined by local terms - area median income, fair market rent, and the employment base of the particular region - without the ability fund initiatives or to create sufficient incentives or mandates, it is difficult to have any impact on affordable housing. As with all affordable housing initiatives, local governments may use existing tools like inclusionary zoning, upzonings, density bonuses to create desired outcomes. Incentives may include waiver of fees like building permit fees, water and sewer fees. Real estate transfer taxes and retail sales taxes may provide funding in states where local governments have the power to raise revenue in this way. In Missouri, some examples of policy recommendations for changes at the state level that might accelerate creation of workforce housing include bond issues to fund projects, and mandated inclusion of workforce housing in the comprehensive plans required for the state's largest municipalities.

Metrics to define and address the issue of workforce housing are evolving. Many organizations cite the National Low Income Housing Coalition report "Out Of Reach" which includes data maps to illustrate the mismatch between housing and incomes across the country. A 2010 report from the Washington, D.C.–based non-profit Urban Land Institute entitled "Priced Out" is one example of in-depth study for a specific area. It provides an overview of workforce housing issues in the Boston Metropolitan Region. ULI concludes that the Boston area is 25,000 units shy of the number needed to house the current workforce, and will face a shortage of an additional 11,000 units by 2020. While this example is drawn from one of the most acutely affected areas of the country, it illustrates the usefulness of defining the scope and scale of the problem as a necessary precursor to solving it. The report also includes examples of some typical Boston region families to illustrate that workforce applies to people who are typically perceived to be middle class, such as assistant college professors and civil engineers. Many workforce housing advocates hope that it may find broader support than previous affordable housing initiatives, because it is targeted towards essential members of the community and towards people who are perceived to be hard-working, good neighbors who will not negatively impact real estate values, and more deserving than those who are truly poor.

The National Association of Realtors, the country's largest trade association for real estate professionals, now offers a Workforce Housing Certification and support for related projects through the Ira Gribin Workforce Housing Grant.

== Legislation and projects ==
In 2013 Teachers Village was completed in Newark New Jersey. This mixed use development complex includes charter schools, ground-floor retail, and rental units for 200 Newark teachers. While significant numbers of luxury housing units had been added to Newark during the early 2000s, Teachers Village is one of the first significant additions of housing for moderate or middle-income households.

In the California Bay Area affordable workforce housing has been targeted to retain teachers when it was discovered that high housing costs were a main reason for high turnover. One developer received a density bonus, i.e. the right to build more units than current zoning allowed, in exchange for providing units geared towards people making 80–120% of AMI. Sonoma County, California, is imposing impact fees to fund workforce housing.

Florida has faced record growth for most of its history, including during the recent economic boom. The Florida Housing Coalition has served for almost 20 years as one of the leading U.S. innovators in housing advocacy and helped to create the Sadowski Affordable Housing act in 1991. The South Florida Workforce Housing Initiative has compiled a comprehensive list of approaches to promote workforce housing development, ranging from land banking and financing options, to zoning recommendations and incentives.

New Hampshire passed workforce housing legislation in 2008 and plans for the first project to be built under this legislation were approved in 2010.

In 2008 New York enacted the Long Island Workforce Housing Act which received support in part because long-time residents are seeing their young adult children move away due to housing costs.

== See also ==
- Key worker, a term used in the United Kingdom to refer to essential public sector employees who are often the intended customers for workforce housing schemes in that country
