= Jane Stork =

Former follower of Rajneesh (Indian spiritual leader)

- Born: 1945 (age 80–81); Albany, Western Australia
- Citizenship: German
- Education: University of Western Australia Claremont Teacher’s College (Teaching Licensure)
- Children: 2
- Writing career
- Pen name: Ma Shanti Bhadra Ma Shanti B Catherine Jane Stubbs Catherine Jane Paul Elsea
- Language: English, German
- Notable works: Breaking the Spell: My Life as a Rajneeshee and the Long Journey Back to Freedom

Jane Stork, also known as Ma Shanti Bhadra and Catherine Jane Paul Elsea, is a former follower of Rajneesh. Best known for her involvement with the assassination attempt on Swami Devaraj and her role in the conspiracy to murder Charles Turner, she is now an ex-sannyasin who publicly speaks about the negative side of participating in Rajneeshee activities. She wrote the memoir Breaking the Spell: My Life as a Rajneeshee and the Long Journey Back to Freedom (2009) and is interviewed extensively in Wild Wild Country, a Netflix documentary series about the mass settlement of Rajneesh followers to Antelope in rural Oregon during the 1980s.

== Career & Rajneesh involvement ==
=== Mother Nature health food store ===
According to her memoir, in the mid-1970s, Stork and her then husband Roger Lalor were shown a for sale ad for Mother Nature, a health food store in Midland, Australia. They decided to buy it and reopened it for business less than a week after. At this shop they sold many locally made or grown goods like honey, jam, goat's milk and other whole foods. They managed and operated the shop themselves with very few employees. Stork and Lalor were in charge of running the store front, communicating with vendors and bringing in new products. It was during this time that Stork met the psychologist who introduced her and Lalor to the Rajneesh movement. The pair eventually went to India for a month long trip to visit the Rajneesh ashram and by the end of that trip, they were starting to consider moving to India permanently. In 1978, once back in Australia, Lalor received a letter from the high priest urging them to come back to India, so they sold Mother Nature to a friend and left shortly after.

=== Rajneesh Movement ===
In 1978 Stork, under her sanyassan name of "Ma Shanti Bhadra", moved from her home in Australia to the Rajneesh commune and meditation resort in Pune, India, her children and husband joined her shortly. While she started off doing uncompensated volunteer work cleaning toilets for the ashram, she eventually grew in rank to occupy a variety of positions within the commune. By the Rajneesh Movement's collapse in Oregon in 1985, Stork had risen to being part of the trusted inner circle of Ma Anand Sheela, the personal secretary to leader, Bhagwan Shree Rajneesh. A former colleague of Stork's described her as a nice person, but noted that she did not have much autonomy.

When Bhagwan left India in 1981, Stork followed him and helped provide the manual labor in the push to build an intentional community in Oregon, named Rajneeshpuram. In July 1981 the Rajneeshees bought Big Muddy Ranch in Wasco County Oregon to develop their intentional community, but faced pushback from local ranchers and the 1000 Friends of Oregon environmental group regarding land-use laws. Stork was a spokeswoman on behalf of the Rajneesh Neo-Sannyas International Commune to press outlets such as The Oregonian. The original objections from 1000 friends stated that while creation of urban development on agricultural land, such as Big Muddy Ranch, violated Oregon law, non-agricultural structures could be reasonably constructed in Antelope which is zoned as a city.

The Rajneeshees soon bought additional land in nearby Antelope Oregon hoping to expand their non-agricultural operations such as offices and printing plants. Rajneesh expansion, both on the ranch and in Antelope, was met with hostility from non-Rajneeshee residents. In May 1982 ownership of a mobile home park in Antelope was given to Bill Bowerman despite, as Stork claimed in statements to the press, a previously accepted offer on the property from the Rajneeshees.

As frustrations over land-use requests built between county officials and Rajneeshee leaders, in 1984 Stork was noted as making vulgar comments at a public meeting regarding alleged sexual activities and desires of various county officials.

==== Official roles ====
Between her time in the Pune ashram and as part of the cohort dedicated to establishing the Rajnesshpuram community, Stork slowly worked her way up through different custodial, cooking, teaching, and legal offices. She eventually gained the attention of Sheela in 1984, who later assigned Stork the position of treasurer for the Rajneesh Foundation International (RFI), which helped operate the funds used by the Church corporation. However, the role was simply in name only, as Stork lacked any accounting or financial management training and was only asked to sign cheques for the commune. Her name is often missing from key documents detailing interactions between the numerous Ranjeesh international branches and donations to Rajneeshpuram. A similar scenario seems to have occurred for her role as the vice president of the Rajneesh Medical Corporation. Stork had no medical licenses nor official health care training. She also seemed to lack any knowledge or relation to the 1984 Rajneeshee bioterror attack as she is not mentioned as an associate in the plot despite it happening under the Rajneeshpuram laboratory wing of the Rajneesh Medical Corporation.

=== Rajneesh assassination plots ===
Stork was heavily involved in the 1985 plot led by Sheela Silverman (Ma Anand Sheela) to assassinate US Attorney General, Charles Turner, as well as other commune members and Oregonians deemed a threat. Stork was asked to move into Sheela's house in 1984 after waxing Sheela's legs, eventually growing closer with her and became part of her inner circle, many of whom resided in the section of Rajneeshpuram called “Jesus Grove." Sheela told Stork that Bhagwan was vulnerable to attack, which Stork was convinced that this would be an act to save the Bhagwan from future harm. At this time, Stork was part of "the 38," a special paramilitary branch who operated separately from other divisions of Rajneeshpuram's security. Stork was considered one of the best shooters at Rajneeshpuram, and volunteered to stalk and commit the physical act of assassinating Turner. Stork also helped the team purchase weaponry from Texas and New Mexico, which included handguns and Uzi semiautomatic rifles.

==== Swami Devaraj ====
According to Stork's account in her memoir, Sheela claimed that Bhagwan planned to have his personal doctor Swami Devaraj (also known as George Meredith) provide him with a medically assisted death on July 6, 1985, at the Annual World Festival in Rajneeshpuram. On July 5, Sheela asked for a member of her trusted inner circle to assassinate Deveraj, for which Stork volunteered. During the following day's celebration, Stork stabbed Devaraj a syringe filled of adrenaline. However, the murder attempt was unsuccessful as the syringe had been loaded with a non-lethal amount of substances. After returning from the hospital, Deveraj identified Stork to the Bhagwan, who initially demanded Stork to be drugged and beaten, which Sheela did not do.

=== Leaving Rajneeshpuram ===
After multiple failed assassination attempts of other commune members and collapse of the Turner assassination plot, tensions within Sheela's group of elites came to a head. Stork—who had already begun harboring doubts regarding the moral justifications of the planned murders—declared her refusal to kill others after witnessing a fellow Rajneeshpuram leader descend into a mental breakdown about the group's turn towards violence. In September 1985, shortly after the attempt on Devaraj's life, Stork, Sheela, and others from their group of Rajneeshee elites left Rajneeshpuram and fled abroad. Following Sheela, Stork, her daughter Kylie, and several others took up residence in German hotels. They remained there until their arrests by German authorities.

== Later life ==
=== Trials and public appearance ===
==== Arrest ====
On October 28, 1985, Stork, who was residing in West Germany, was arrested for the attempted murder of Swami Devaraj. On February 6, 1986, she and Ma Anand Sheela were extradited back to Oregon from West Germany to face charges.

Stork was indicted in 1990 for her involvement in the plot to kill Charles Turner. However, she would not leave Germany, and in 1991, the United States' request for her extradition was denied.

==== Sentencing ====
On July 22, 1986, Stork, under the name of Catherine Jane Paul Elsea, entered negotiated plea deals in the Multnomah County Circuit Court. Stork pled guilty to state charges that she had been involved in the poisoning of two Wasco County Commissioners and Swami Devaraj, and was given a sentence of ten years in federal prison. Ma Anand Puja (Diane Onang) and Ma Anand Sheela were entering pleas at the same time, but with additional appearances in the US District Court, for which Stork was not included.

In June 1987, Stork was released from prison after serving only 19 months of her 10-year sentence. Under the conditions of her plea agreement, she was required to immediately leave the United States. She planned to return to Australia after her release.

In September 2005, Stork voluntarily returned to Portland to face federal charges for her role in the abandoned murder plot of Charles Turner. In doing so, she was allowed to visit her son Peter in Australia, who was dying of cancer. After this visit, she would be sentenced on December 6, 2005.

Stork was sentenced to time served for this offense because of the 3 months she spent in jail during the battle over her extradition in 1991, and 5 years of probation in Germany.

=== Book ===
Stork published her book Breaking the Spell: My Life as a Rajneeshee and the Long Journey Back to Freedom in April 2009. It was an autobiography sharing her life story, primarily focusing on her time as part of the Rajneesh Movement.

=== Wild Wild Country ===
In 2018, Stork participated in Wild Wild Country, a six-episode documentary series on Netflix about the Rajneesh Movement. The series centered in the creation of Rajneeshpuram and the Rajneesh movement's occupation of the Big Muddy Ranch. The series used photos, archived videos, and interviews. Many episodes featured Stork as a lead interviewee. Throughout the series, Stork talks about how she first encountered the movement and her initial impressions of the Bhagwan. She also mentions the ashram in India and what drew her to the Bhagwan originally. Stork also shared what the early days at the ranch in Oregon looked like, including the tension with the town of Antelope and her growing devotion to Sheela. The last three episodes focus on the criminal charges against members of Rajneeshpuram. Stork shares how she was involved with acquiring firearms, planning, and attempting to both assassinate Charles Turner and Swami Devaraj. Lastly, she shares her perspective surrounding her eventual arrest and return to Portland in 1986, along with her later return in 2005.

== Personal life ==
=== Family ===
Born in Perth Australia, Jane was the fourth born sibling of five children. Her three older sisters are Rosemary, Susan, and Mary Lou, and her younger brother is named John. Stork met her first husband, geologist Roger Lalor, during her time in at the University of Western Australia. The couple married in 1966. They had two children together, Kylie and Peter Lalor.

=== Marriages ===
Stork and Roger Lalor lived in Australia for a majority of their early marriage. However, as noted across her memoir and interviews, throughout their marriage, Stork felt growing resentment and anger towards Roger. Seeking marriage mediation, Stork and Roger Lalor began seeing a psychologist, who was a Rajneeshee and first introduced them to the Rajneesh Movement. While living at the ashram in India, Stork was sterilized. In 1983, Stork and Roger divorced so both of them could marry American sanyassins to attain American citizenship and be eligible to join the Rajneeshpuram community. After divorcing her second husband, Stork later met and married Hans-George Stork during her time in Germany.
