= Breaking the Spell =

Breaking the Spell may refer to:

- Breaking the Spell, a 1999 documentary film about the 1999 WTO riots by CrimethInc.
- Breaking the Spell: Religion as a Natural Phenomenon, a 2006 book by Daniel Dennett
- Breaking the Spell: My Life as a Rajneeshee and the Long Journey Back to Freedom, a 2009 book by Jane Stork
- "Breaking the Spell", a 2021 song by Van Morrison from the album Latest Record Project, Volume 1

== See also ==
- Break the Spell, a 2011 album by Daughtry
