= 1985 Rajneeshee assassination plot =

Assassination plot in Portland, Oregon

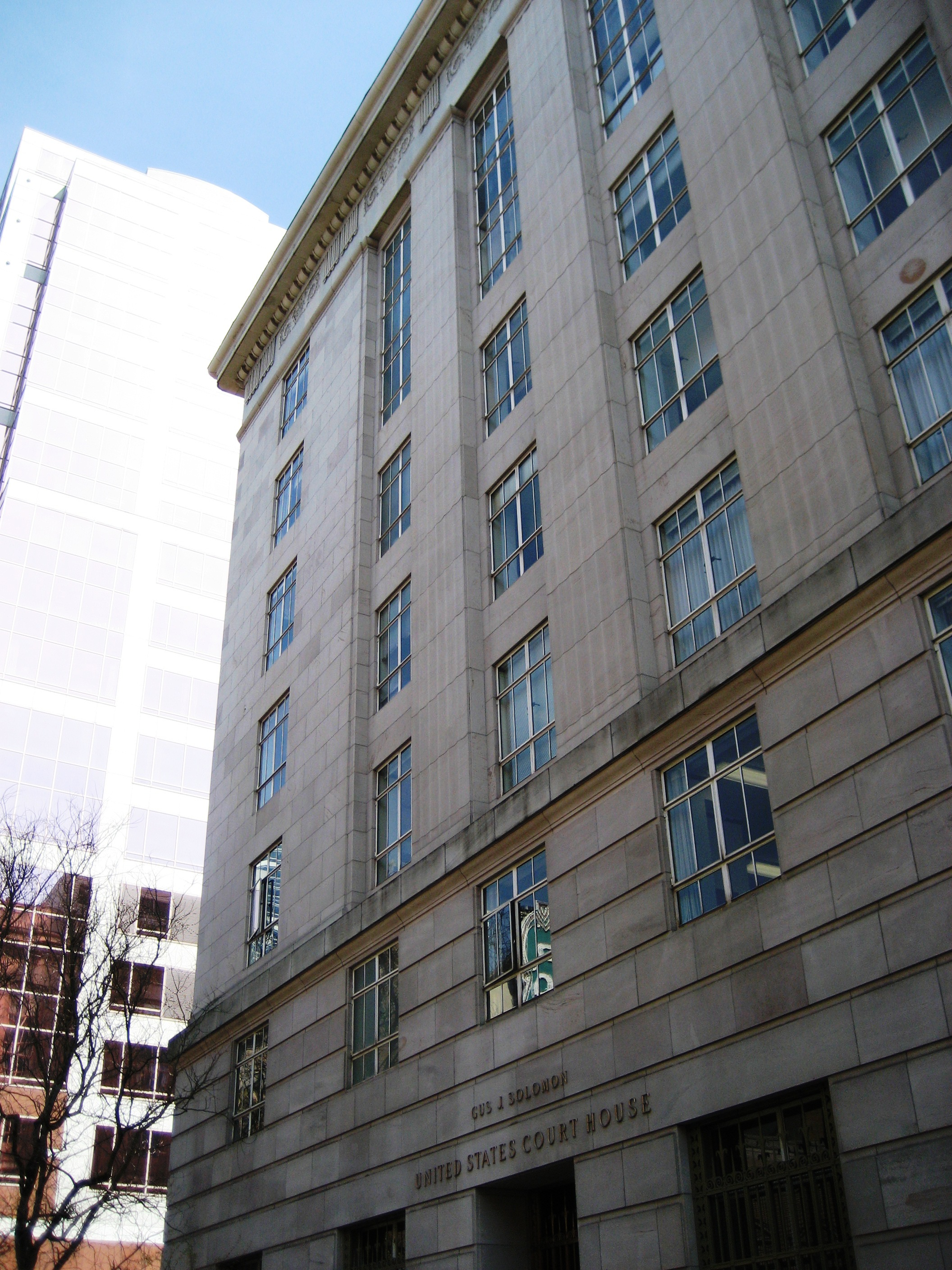
- Gus J. Solomon United States Courthouse in Portland
- Location: 45°30′57″N 122°40′35″W; Portland, Oregon, U.S.
- Date: 1985
- Target: Charles H. Turner, United States Attorney for the District of Oregon
- Attack type: Conspiracy to commit assassination
- Weapons: Pistols, handguns
- Deaths: 0
- Injuries: 0
- Perpetrator: Rajneesh Movement
- Assailants: Ma Anand Sheela, Alma Potter, Sally-Anne Croft, Susan Hagan, Ann Phyllis McCarthy, Jane Stork, Richard Kevin Langford, Carol Matthews, Phyllis Caldwell and Ava Avalos; an additional unindicted member of Rajneesh commune

In 1985, a group of high-ranking Rajneeshees, followers of the Indian mystic Rajneesh (later known as Osho), conspired to assassinate Charles Turner, the then-United States Attorney for the District of Oregon. Rajneesh's personal secretary and second-in-command, Ma Anand Sheela (Sheela Silverman), assembled the group after Turner was appointed to investigate illegal activity at the followers' community, Rajneeshpuram. Turner investigated charges of immigration fraud and sham marriages, and later headed the federal prosecution of the 1984 Rajneeshee bioterror attack in The Dalles, Oregon.

The conspirators included Sheela; Sally-Anne Croft, chief financial officer of Rajneeshpuram; Susan Hagan, head of security at Rajneeshpuram; Catherine Jane Stork, who bought weapons and suppressors and volunteered to be the actual murderer; Ann Phyllis McCarthy, fourth-in-command of Rajneeshpuram; and co-conspirators Alma Potter, Carol Matthews, Phyllis Caldwell, and Richard Kevin Langford. Two of the conspirators obtained false identification to purchase handguns out-of-state, stalked Turner, and planned to murder him near his workplace in Portland, Oregon. The assassination plot was never carried out and was only discovered later, as a result of the investigation by federal law enforcement into the bioterror attack in The Dalles and other illegal acts by the Rajneeshpuram leadership.

Prosecution of the conspirators began in 1990, when a federal grand jury brought indictments against several of the key players. Some had fled the country, and extradition proceedings against the perpetrators and subsequent prosecution and conviction was not completed for sixteen years. The final conspirator was convicted in 2006, when Catherine Jane Stork agreed to return to the United States from Germany in order to be allowed to visit her terminally ill son in Australia. Eight perpetrators received sentences ranging from five years' probation to five years in federal prison and an additional member of the Rajneesh commune pleaded guilty to murder conspiracy. Rajneesh was never prosecuted in relation to the conspiracy, and left the United States after pleading guilty to immigration fraud and agreeing not to reenter the country without permission from the U.S. Attorney General.

== Planning ==
=== Hit list ===
Seven followers (called Rajneeshees) of charismatic leader Bhagwan Shree Rajneesh (now known as Osho), were convicted of a 1985 conspiracy to assassinate Charles Turner, and an additional unindicted eighth member of the Rajneesh commune pleaded guilty to murder conspiracy. The perpetrators were high-ranking followers within the Rajneeshee organization. Prosecutors in the case stated that the perpetrators had planned to murder Turner after he was appointed to head an investigation into the group's activities in Rajneeshpuram, Oregon. Turner's investigation focused on sham marriages organized by the group, as well as other illegal activities including immigration fraud, and he later headed the federal prosecution relating to the 1984 Rajneeshee bioterror attack in The Dalles, Oregon. Oregon Attorney General Dave Frohnmayer was also involved in investigations of the group, working alongside Turner.

In May 1985, Rajneesh's personal secretary and second-in-command, Sheela Silverman (Ma Anand Sheela), gathered the leader's key followers and formed a group of conspirators in order to consider what to do with the growing concern of Turner's continuous involvement with the Ranch. Sheela stated that Turner's grand jury investigation "threatened the existence of the commune", and exposed Rajneesh and several of his disciples to criminal prosecution. Sheela hoped that by removing Turner's influence they would be able to thwart the federal immigration investigation which could have resulted in deportation of Rajneeshee leaders. Three former leaders of the commune including Ma Anand Sheela, Dianne Yvonne Onang (Ma Anand Puja), a registered nurse from the Philippines who managed the Rajneeshee medical corporation, and former treasurer of Rajneesh Foundation International and Catherine Jane Stork (Ma Shanti Bhadra) of Australia, put together a hit list which included U.S. Attorney Charles Turner and Oregon Attorney General David Frohnmayer.

Susan Hagan (Ma Anand Su), a top official in the Rajneeshpuram hierarchy, was also a participant in the assassination conspiracy. Hagan was in charge of the security force at Rajneeshpuram, ran the Rajneesh Investment Corporation, and supervised construction on the commune. Other conspirators in the assassination plot included Ann Phyllis McCarthy (Ma Yoga Vidya), president of the Rajneesh commune, and Alma Potter (Ma Dhyan Yogini), Ma Anand Sheela's bodyguard and traveling companion. Potter was manager of the Hotel Rajneesh in Portland, Oregon, and a member of the commune's security force. The Oregonian reported that nine people were on the hit list, including: Turner, Frohnmayer, former assistant attorney general Karen H. Green, Wasco County planning director Daniel C. Durow, Wasco County commissioner James L. Comini, investigative journalist for The Oregonian Leslie L. Zaitz, former member Helen C. Byron (Ma Idam Shunyo), who had been awarded US$1.7 million in a lawsuit against Rajneesh Foundation International, her daughter Barbara J. Byron (Makima), and Rajneesh's former secretary Laxmi Thakarsi Kuruwa (Ma Yoga Laxmi).

=== Weapons ===
Catherine Jane Stork volunteered to be the follower who would carry out the assassination, and bought guns and suppressors. Stork was known to fellow followers as Ma Shanti Bhadra, and was also one of the three "Big Mammas" in Rajneeshpuram. Sally-Anne Croft (known by followers as Ma Prem Savita), an accountant and the group's Chief Financial Officer, provided money for the purchase of weapons related to the plot. Phyllis Caldwell (Ma Deva Ritka) described in a federal affidavit how members of the murder conspiracy obtained handguns, referring to Catherine Jane Stork and Sally-Anne Croft: "Shanti B went down to Jesus Grove, and Savita gave us several thousand dollars to use to buy guns." Jesus Grove referred to a group of trailers where all the leaders of the Rajneesh commune resided, except for Bhagwan Shree Rajneesh.

Ma Anand Sheela and three other Rajneesh followers traveled to New York in the spring of 1985 to acquire false identification. According to a federal indictment, the perpetrators of the assassination plot used a false birth certificate to purchase guns. Two members of the group then traveled to Texas to purchase handguns. Caldwell stated she and Catherine Jane Stork flew to Texas to purchase guns there. They purchased five guns in Texas, but encountered difficulty purchasing handguns in Texas with out-of-state identification and traveled to New Mexico instead. Caldwell said they called back to the commune but the women were instructed "not to come back without the guns".

In New Mexico, they obtained false identification, and purchased several pistols. Their intention was to purchase guns which were difficult to trace. Caldwell said it was easy to obtain guns in New Mexico: "we found it was pretty easy to buy guns. All you had to do was show some identification and it was easy to get." Caldwell said she and Stork went to a university library to find the identity "of someone dying very young", next went "to public records and asked for a copy of a birth certificate" and described how "we got a rent receipt book and just made up a rent receipt". "And then we were able to go to several different gun shops in Albuquerque with those two bits of identification and buy five different guns and bullets," said Caldwell. They were able to obtain one Colt .38-caliber revolver, and four Ruger .357-caliber Security-Six Magnum revolvers. The conspirators smuggled the guns into Oregon by packing them in luggage and putting the luggage on a Greyhound Lines bus. Caldwell said that she and Stork traveled by bus back to the Rajneesh commune so as to avoid airport metal detectors.

=== Surveillance ===
After obtaining guns the conspirators returned to Portland, Oregon. They rented out an apartment in Portland to serve as their base of operations for the assassination of Turner. Rajneesh follower Carol Matthews (Ma Prem Samadhi) attempted to obtain the home address of Charles Turner, as she was doing research on him and his work in order to find another way of relating to his animosity toward the commune. According to federal prosecutors Matthews obtained a college yearbook of Turner's, and learned his car's license plate number and his parking location. Court records state that Matthews and an unindicted co-conspirator told officials they were conducting "a voter survey", in order to obtain Turner's route number and post office box number. The two tried repeating the story with members of the U.S. Postal Service, but the postal officials did not give them Turner's address. They then drove around Turner's neighborhood and were able to find his home by locating a sign in front of his residence that said "Turner". Matthews had pictures of Turner's residence developed; these were later obtained by the Federal Bureau of Investigation (FBI) during an investigation of the Rajneesh commune, and verified after being shown to Turner. The whole process was done in order to try and meet with him to interview and determine what his concerns were, as he refused to meet with anyone at his office.

With this information, however, several members of the group of conspirators watched Turner's office, home and car, and discussed methods to assassinate him, hoping that his death would hinder the efforts of the federal investigation into Rajneeshpuram. Their plan was to shoot Turner in the garage of the federal office building where he worked, in Portland, Oregon, but the conspirators also debated whether to murder Turner in downtown Portland or closer to his home. After spending multiple nights watching Turner's house, the conspirators decided on the parking garage because they felt it would be too risky to murder him on the drive to or from work, or in front of his home. Turner had a reserved parking spot in a federal garage underneath Terry Schrunk Plaza in Portland, Oregon. In an affidavit given to the FBI, conspirator Alma Peralta described how the perpetrators decided on the federal parking garage as the location: "Shanti Bhadra [Catherine Jane Stork] said this seems like a good place to bump this fellow off."

The conspirators practiced different ways of murdering Turner. According to informant statements to law enforcement, one of the conspirators was to pretend there was car trouble, and the others would then approach Turner with their guns. Informants later told law enforcement officials that the conspirators intended to hide out at an international network of Rajneesh communes if the plan was successful. According to The Oregonian the assassinations were not carried out because Ma Anand Sheela became distracted by political power plays within the Rajneesh commune and other members of the organization who were trying to remove her from her position within the group. According to witness information, Ma Anand Sheela was persuaded not to carry out this action through conversations with Carol Matthews, who stated to her that this was not a solution in any way and would be a horrendous action.

== Prosecutions ==
=== Investigation ===
On February 28, 1985, Congressman James H. Weaver gave a speech in the United States House of Representatives in which he asserted that the Rajneeshees were involved in the bioterror attack in Oregon. At a series of press conferences in September 1985, Rajneesh accused several of his recently departed lieutenants of involvement in this and other crimes, including the poisoning of Mike Sullivan, a Jefferson County district attorney, and asked state and federal authorities to investigate his allegations. The assassination plot was uncovered by federal law enforcement as a result of the ensuing investigation into activities at Rajneeshpuram. Turner was never physically harmed, and had retired by 1995.

The Oregonian was informed in October 1985 by federal law enforcement officials that Leslie L. Zaitz, an investigative journalist who had written a 20-part series on the Rajneesh movement in Oregon, was on a "hit list" which also included Turner and Oregon Attorney General David Frohnmayer. Assistant U.S. Attorney Robert Weaver prosecuted the case; the charges were first detailed at an October 1985 bond hearing in North Carolina after Rajneesh and his followers were arrested at an airport in Charlotte. Weaver said in court that followers of Bhagwan Shree Rajneesh had plotted to assassinate Turner and Frohnmayer. He said these allegations were reasons why releasing Rajneesh and his followers from jail would be "a clear and present danger to public officials". The guns purchased by the Rajneesh followers for the assassination plot had reportedly been dumped in a lake at Rancho Rajneesh; the lake was searched by U.S. Navy divers. Scuba divers searched the lake for two days but did not find the guns.

Joseph Greene, a U.S. immigration agent, testified in court that FBI agents had learned of the assassination plot from a member of the organization who was in a witness protection program. Greene said that members involved in the assassination plot included Ma Anand Sheela, Dianne Yvonne Onang, and Alma Peralta. The assassination plot was investigated by the FBI and the Oregon State Police. Informants told law enforcement that, prior to her decision not to carry out the action, Ma Anand Sheela hoped Turner's death would prevent an Immigration and Naturalization Service investigation which she thought could lead to Rajneesh's arrest and deportation from the United States. Weaver stated "These attempts to assassinate public officials were because they were presenting an immigration case that might result in imprisonment" of Rajneesh. "There were not simply plans, but at least one (assassination) attempt," said Weaver at the hearing.

A grand jury investigation led by Turner brought charges of "widespread immigration fraud" against members of Rajneeshpuram. Wiretapping crimes were discovered after Ma Anand Sheela had fled the commune in September 1985. In December 1985, twenty-one followers of Rajneesh were indicted on wiretapping charges.

=== Arrests and convictions ===
Chief criminal assistant U.S. attorney Baron C. Sheldahl was assigned to prosecute the charges of federal wiretapping, and a special team from the United States Department of Justice Criminal Division was tasked with prosecuting the murder conspiracy charges. Four of the perpetrators were arrested in September 1990. Catherine Jane Stork and Richard Kevin Langford were arrested in West Germany, Ann Phyllis McCarthy was arrested in South Africa, and Susan Hagan was arrested in England. In September 1990, Alma Peralta pleaded guilty to conspiracy to commit murder. Peralta, who had served as Ma Anand Sheela's bodyguard and confidante, agreed to testify against the other defendants in the murder conspiracy. Under the terms of Peralta's plea agreement she received a sentence of two years in federal prison. Carol Matthews was arrested in Baden-Baden, Germany in October 1990 on charges of wiretapping and conspiracy to murder Turner, where she was held along with three other Rajneeshees. Indictments were brought against Ma Anand Sheela and six other co-conspirators by a federal grand jury in November 1990.

In April 1991, Carol Matthews and Richard Kevin Langford (Swami Anugiten) were extradited from Germany to the United States in order to appear in federal court in Portland, Oregon. Law enforcement officials from the United States Marshals Service traveled to Frankfurt, Germany, and took custody of the Matthews and Langford at Rhine Main Airport. On April 15, 1991, Matthews and Langford appeared in federal court in Oregon, and both pleaded innocent to charges of conspiracy to commit murder and carrying out wiretapping. On April 25, 1991, Richard Kevin Langford pleaded guilty in federal court to participating in the murder conspiracy plot against Turner, and in exchange he received a sentence of five years in federal prison and the dismissal of other charges against him relating to firearms and wiretapping. Langford agreed to testify against the other members of the murder conspiracy. Langford wrote on his plea agreement form: "In 1985, meetings were held at the Rancho Rajneesh ... at which time the possible killing of the United States Attorney for Oregon was discussed. I participated in a number of these meetings and agreed with others to work toward that object." Prosecutor Timothy J. Reardon III stated that Langford had been a member of the Rajneesh commune in Oregon since it began in 1981, and that the government was able to prove he joined the murder conspiracy at a point in time after May 25, 1985. Reardon said that Langford was a member of a group called the "Circle of 38", which was the personal security force that guarded Bhagwan Shree Rajneesh, and that he had served as a weapons instructor and policeman at the commune. Langford told U.S. District Judge Malcolm F. Marsh that he had suggested that guns for the murder conspiracy could be bought in Texas, instructed the conspirators about suppressors, took responsibility for the weapons while they were in the commune, and disposed of them when members of the murder conspiracy decided to flee the U.S. for Europe. In July 1991, Carol Matthews, who did not offer any evidence against the others, entered an Alford plea indicating exactly what she did with her research, including dissuading Sheela, and was given a five-year sentence in federal court. She was the only one to serve a complete sentence and spent the longest amount of time in prison.

Catherine Jane Stork was convicted of the attempted murder of Rajneesh's physician Dr. George Meredith (Swami Devaraj) in 1986, and served almost three years in jail. After her release, agents from the FBI uncovered the plot to assassinate Turner, but Stork had already fled to Germany. She was indicted by a federal grand jury in 1990. In 1991, the German government refused to extradite Stork back to the United States. In June 1991, U.S. prosecutors filed affidavits in the murder conspiracy case with the Higher Regional Court in Karlsruhe, Germany, as part of an attempt to extradite Catherine Jane Stork from Germany to the U.S. The affidavits stated that all of the members in the murder conspiracy plot also belonged to a group of Rajneesh followers at the Oregon commune known as "the 38", and were trained in "commando tactics using Uzi semiautomatic rifles and handguns". David Berry Knapp (known to Rajneesh followers as Swami Krishna Deva) stated in an FBI affidavit that the murder conspiracy was motivated by Ma Anand Sheela's "tremendous anger" towards Turner.

Ma Anand Sheela served 29 months in a minimum-security federal prison for charges related to assault, attempted murder, arson, wiretapping and the 1984 bioterror attack in The Dalles, and moved to Switzerland after her release from prison in 1988. The assassination conspiracy was discovered after Sheela had left the United States, and as of 1999 she was still wanted by federal law enforcement for her role in the plot, and risked extradition if she crossed the Swiss border. Switzerland declined an extradition request from the United States, and instead tried her in a Swiss court. Sheela was found guilty of "criminal acts preparatory to the commission of murder" in 1999, and sentenced to time already served.

Sally-Anne Croft and Susan Hagan were extradited from Britain in 1994, and were convicted by a jury decision on July 28, 1995, for their roles in the assassination plot. They had unsuccessfully attempted to appeal their extradition from Britain to Home Secretary Michael Howard. During their trial the prosecution presented twenty-nine witnesses, including former followers of Rajneesh who placed both women in planning meetings where they discussed murdering Turner. David Berry Knapp, the former mayor of Rajneeshpuram, testified for the government in the case and implicated Croft and Hagan in the assassination conspiracy. Ava Kay Avalos (Ma Ava), a Rajneesh disciple, testified in the Croft case and stated that she had been part of the conspirators that plotted to assassinate Turner. In addition to Knapp and Avalos, co-conspirators Richard Kevin Langford, Phyllis Caldwell, and Alma Peralta testified in the case pursuant to conditional plea or immunity agreements. Both women were sentenced to five years in prison. Croft and Hagan did not testify during their trial. "We hashed over everything—evidence, notes, evidence, notes. I think we did an absolutely fabulous job," said one of the jurors. At the sentencing for Croft and Hagan, the federal Judge Malcolm Marsh described them as "people of obvious goodwill who had committed an extremely serious offense against the criminal justice system." Prosecutor Tim Reardon called the conspiracy to commit assassination "a deadly serious crime aimed at the heart of the criminal justice system." Croft and Hagan were released from imprisonment at FCI Dublin, California, in April 1998, and returned to Britain.

In December 2002, Ann Phyllis McCarthy pleaded guilty to conspiracy to commit murder, and was sentenced to one year in jail and a fine of US$10,000. McCarthy had served as fourth-in-command of Rajneeshpuram, and was known by Rajneesh's followers as Ma Yoga Vidya. Turner called the one-year prison sentence "laughable." In court statements, McCarthy stated "I cannot forgive myself for not being tougher at the time," and called her time with the group "psychological torture."

In February 2006, Stork became the last perpetrator sentenced in the political assassination plot, after ten months of negotiations with Oregon prosecutors. Stork offered to turn herself in and return to the United States after learning of her son's terminal brain tumor. Prior to sentencing, the court allowed her to travel to Australia to visit her son. In addition to charges of conspiracy to commit murder, Stork also pleaded guilty to the purchase of weapons in violation of federal firearms law. An Oregon judge sentenced her to five years' probation, and three months' time already served in a German jail. Turner thought she should have received a harsher sentence, and commented "This was a lying-in-wait conspiracy to murder me, a presidential appointee, and for a long time I slept with a loaded gun beside my bed." Though Stork could have faced life in prison, U.S. District Judge Judge Malcolm F. Marsh thought she had "seen the error of her ways." A federal prosecutor in the case described Stork as the "MVP" of the conspiracy, and said she was the designated assassin that was set to murder Turner. After her sentencing, Stork stated: "I actually conspired to kill Mr. Turner, it is up to me alone to face this terrible truth ... No person has the right to do what I did. I'm truly sorry." Stork returned to Germany after her sentencing.

In an affidavit, Timothy J. Reardon III, lead prosecutor for the United States Department of Justice in the case, stated Ma Anand Sheela had told members of the murder conspiracy that Bhagwan Shree Rajneesh had personally authorized the "necessary" murder of specific enemies of the Rajneesh commune. Bhagwan Shree Rajneesh paid a fine of US$400,000, agreed to plead guilty to immigration fraud, and was deported from the United States. He agreed to leave the United States and not return unless given permission first from the United States Attorney General. Joseph T. McCann writes in Terrorism on American Soil "Nevertheless, he was never prosecuted for any of the more serious crimes perpetrated by cult members, including the salmonella poisoning."

=== Sentences ===
Conspiracy to assassinate a United States Attorney

Perpetrator	Conviction	Sentence
Alma Potter (a.k.a. Alma Peralta, Ma Dhyan Yogini)	Convicted in Oregon in 1990	Sentenced to two years in prison.
Richard Kevin Langford (a.k.a. Swami Anugiten)	Convicted in Oregon in 1990	Sentenced to three years in prison for conspiracy to murder.
Carol Matthews (a.k.a. Samadhi Selecki, Ma Prem Samadhi, Carol Longo)	Alford Plea Sentenced in Oregon in 1991	Sentenced to five years in prison.
Sally-Anne Croft (aka Ma Prem Savita), Chief Financial Officer at Rajneeshpuram	Convicted in Oregon in 1995	Sentenced to five years in federal prison, released in April 1998.
Susan Hagan, Rajneeshpuram head of security (a.k.a. Ma Anand Su, Susan Strock, Susan Lissanevitch)	Convicted in Oregon in 1995	Sentenced to five years in federal prison, released in April 1998.
Ma Anand Sheela, Rajneesh's second-in-command (a.k.a. Sheela Silverman, Sheela Birnstiel)	Convicted in a Swiss court in 1999	Sentenced to time served.
Ann Phyllis McCarthy, fourth-in-command of Rajneeshpuram (a.k.a. Ma Yoga Vidya)	Convicted in Oregon in 2002	Sentenced to one year in jail and a US$10,000 fine.
Catherine Jane Stork (a.k.a. Catherine Jane Stubbs, Ma Shanti Bhadra)	Convicted in Oregon in 2006	Received five years' probation.
Additional commune member	pleaded guilty to murder conspiracy in 1990	Was not indicted.

Wiretapping, and other charges, testified in assassination case

Perpetrator	Conviction	Sentence
Ava Kay Avalos (a.k.a. Ma Ava)	Complete immunity from prosecution, May 1990	Required to testify in U.S. v. Croft, on condition that false testimony would result in rescinding the immunity agreement.
David Berry Knapp (a.k.a. Swami Krishna Deva)	Plea deal in 1990, in exchange for testimony in U.S. v. Croft	Received two years in prison for making false statements.
Phyllis Caldwell (a.k.a. Ma Deva Ritka)	Plea deal in 1990, in exchange for testimony in U.S. v Croft	Five years' probation following guilty plea to wiretapping.

== See also ==
- Breaking the Spell: My Life as a Rajneeshee and the Long Journey Back to Freedom
- Attacks on the United States
