= Breaking the Spell (Stork book) =

2009 book by Catherine Jane Stork

- Book cover
- Author: Catherine Jane Stork
- Language: English
- Subject: Rajneesh movement
- Genre: Non-fiction
- Publisher: Pan Macmillan
- Publication date: April 2009
- Publication place: Australia
- Pages: 342
- ISBN: 978-1-4050-3905-5
- OCLC: 300429046
- LC Class: BP605.R344 S86 2009

Breaking the Spell: My Life as a Rajneeshee and the Long Journey Back to Freedom is a non-fiction book by Catherine Jane Stork about her experiences as a Rajneeshee, a follower of Indian guru Bhagwan Shree Rajneesh (now known as Osho). It was published in April 2009 by Pan Macmillan. Stork was raised in Western Australia in a Catholic upbringing, and met her first husband while at university in Perth, Australia. After a psychotherapist introduced Stork to teachings of Rajneesh, she became involved in the movement and moved with her husband to an ashram in Poona, India. Stork later moved to the Rajneesh commune in Rajneeshpuram, Oregon. She became involved in criminal activities while at Rajneeshpuram, participated in an attempted murder against Rajneesh's doctor, and an assassination plot against the U.S. Attorney for Oregon, Charles H. Turner. Stork served time in jail but later lived in exile in Germany for 16 years, after a German court had denied extradition to the United States. She returned to the U.S. to face criminal charges after learning of her son's terminal cancer condition. Stork discusses her process of reevaluating the effects her actions within the Rajneesh organization had on other people and on her family.

The book received generally positive reception in the press and media. The Australian Associated Press commented that Stork "provides an insight into the mind of the Bhagwan and his mouthpiece Ma Sheela", and The Sunday Mail called the book "An amazing story of self-delusion, followed by self-determination and redemption." The Sunday Telegraph highlighted the book in the newspaper's "Must Read" section, and The Gold Coast Bulletin called it "Shattering". A review in The Age commented that the book exposes "the ultimately selfish nature of apparently selfless fanaticism".

== Background ==
Born in 1945, Catherine Jane Stork was raised in Western Australia, in a family of five children. She is the daughter of a math teacher from Albany, Western Australia. Her family maintained a strict Catholic household. Stork met her first husband Roger while attending university in Perth, Australia. Catherine and Roger married and had children Kylie and Peter. After suffering from bouts of anger which Stork directed at her husband, a psychotherapist recommended she attend meetings at a centre in Perth, where addresses by Bhagwan Shree Rajneesh were shown. By 1977, Stork and her husband had become devoted followers of Rajneesh, and they moved to the Rajneesh ashram in Poona, India, in 1978. Stork moved to the Rajneesh commune in Rajneeshpuram, Oregon, in 1984, where she observed Rajneesh's lavish lifestyle which included Rolls-Royces and million-dollar diamond watches.

While at Rajneeshpuram, Stork became involved in an assassination plot against then-United States Attorney for Oregon Charles Turner. Stork was convicted of the attempted murder of Rajneesh's physician in 1986, and served almost three years in jail. After her release, agents from the Federal Bureau of Investigation (FBI) uncovered the plot to assassinate Turner, but Stork had already fled to Germany. She was indicted by a federal grand jury in 1990. In 1991, the German government refused to extradite Stork back to the United States. In June 1991, U.S. prosecutors filed affidavits in the murder conspiracy case with the Higher Regional Court in Karlsruhe, as part of an attempt to extradite Stork from Germany to the U.S. In February 2006, Stork became the last perpetrator sentenced in the political assassination plot against Turner, after ten months of negotiations with Oregon prosecutors. Stork offered to turn herself in and return to the United States after learning of her son's terminal brain tumor. Prior to sentencing, the court allowed her to travel to Australia to visit her son. In addition to charges of conspiracy to commit murder, Stork also pleaded guilty to the purchase of weapons in violation of federal firearms law. An Oregon judge sentenced her to five years probation, and three months time already served in a German jail during the extradition dispute with the United States. Though Stork could have faced life in prison, U.S. District Judge Judge Malcolm F. Marsh thought she had "seen the error of her ways." A federal prosecutor in the case described Stork as the "MVP" of the conspiracy, and said she was the designated assassin that was set to murder Turner. After her sentencing, Stork stated: "I actually conspired to kill Mr. Turner, it is up to me alone to face this terrible truth ... No person has the right to do what I did. I'm truly sorry." Stork returned to Germany after her sentencing. She met her second husband, a mathematics professor named George, while she was working in Germany. In 2009, Stork resided near the Black Forest in Germany, with her second husband.

== Contents ==
Stork became exposed to the teachings of Bhagwan Shree Rajneesh as a young wife. She decided to accept this as her new faith, and moved with her two children and her husband to live on an ashram of the Rajneesh movement, in India. She and her family would later move to live with the Rajneesh movement in the United States. Stork describes the impact that her time in the Rajneesh organization had on her children and her marriage, including an account of walking in on her husband kissing their neighbor, and her own sexual experiences with a stranger. While in the Rajneesh organization she took a new name of "Ma Shanti Bhadra".

Stork left her husband and children and broke off contact with her parents and siblings. She gained an influential position within the Rajneesh organization, and worked closely with Rajneesh's secretary, Ma Anand Sheela (Sheela Silverman). Stork believed she had to defend Rajneesh, and was part of an attempted murder plot which at the time she felt would protect him. She discusses how she attempted to kill Rajneesh's doctor with a syringe filled with adrenaline, and also plotted to kill U.S. attorney Charles H. Turner. Stork discovered that while in the organization, her children were sexually abused. "It still makes me want to cry. It is the most painful thing to realise what I did to them. They are incredible people and I am so proud of them, but they really suffered," said Stork of her children's abuse while in the Rajneesh organization. She spent a period of 16 years in Germany while the U.S. government attempted to extradite her to face charges, and later served jail time in Germany while awaiting possible extradition to the United States for her role in the attempted murder plot. In addition to her prison sentence, her son Peter's condition of a brain tumour affected her, and she reevaluated her experiences in the Rajneesh organization and the effects her actions had caused. She was given leave by a United States federal court to visit her son, on condition she return to the U.S. to face charges. "It was a rough ride, but I made it. It does feel as though I spent a very long time asleep in a dream," said Stork.

== Reception ==
The Sunday Telegraph highlighted the book in the newspaper's "Must Read" section. Lucy Clark of The Sunday Mail described the book as "one woman's extraordinary story of becoming a devotee of the Bhagwan Shree Rajneesh ... sacrificing self, family and freedom to carry out the bizarre—not to mention criminal—wishes of her guru". Clark concluded that Breaking the Spell is "An amazing story of self-delusion, followed by self-determination and redemption." A review in The Gold Coast Bulletin commented "A prime example of religion gone bonkers, Stork's journey goes from adoration to betrayal, madness to redemption," concluding: "In a word: Shattering".

"In her new book, Breaking the Spell: My Life as a Rajneeshee and the Long Journey Back to Freedom, Stork ... provides an insight into the mind of the Bhagwan and his mouthpiece Ma Sheela"

— Australian Associated Press

Writing for The Age, Fiona Capp noted: "Interestingly, what this memoir unconsciously exposes is the ultimately selfish nature of apparently selfless fanaticism. For all Stork's contrition, Breaking the Spell left me angry and saddened." In a separate review for The Sunday Age, Lucy Sussex commented on the history of the Rajneesh movement: "The Rajneeshees have become an almost forgotten cult. They lacked the notoriety of the Jonestown bloodbath, or the political meddling of the Exclusive Brethren. Nobody got killed, a minor miracle, as this book shows." Fran Metcalf of The Courier-Mail described the book as a chronicle of Stork's "turbulent and bizarre life". A review by the Australian Associated Press wrote that Stork "provides an insight into the mind of the Bhagwan and his mouthpiece Ma Sheela", noting "Charismatic and feisty, Sheela was hugely influential in the organisation, Stork says. But she was also the Bhagwan's puppet and scapegoat, and ultimately his fall-woman."

Sunanda Mehta of Indian Express wrote that "the book paints a sordid picture of the guru and his ways" and noted it was "already creating ripples amongst readers and Osho followers the world over." A spokeswoman for the Osho Meditation Resort in Pune stated "Whatever [Stork] may have written has no relevance to us. She is writing about Rajneesh and the commune, that part is over and gone." Swami Chaitanya Keerti, editor of the Osho World magazine, said that Stork "did not have any power or individuality of her own. She did whatever Ma Anand Sheela asked her to do. She may be repenting now what she had done then and blaming everything on Osho. She may be bitter about being jailed for her misdeeds."
