= Ecclesia Athletic Association =

Group founder Eldridge Broussard, seated in discussion with EAA members

The Ecclesia Athletic Association (EAA) was an organization founded by Eldridge Broussard in 1975, with the stated mission of helping children escape the dangers of inner-city Los Angeles through strict discipline and athletic training and which later had members charged with manslaughter and child abuse. In 1987, the group moved from its headquarters in the Watts neighborhood of Los Angeles to Sandy, Oregon. The group sometimes attracted accusations that it was a cult, often from neighbors or the family of members inside the group. Broussard publicly denied the label, including in 1984 and in a 1988 appearance on The Oprah Winfrey Show.

The October 1988 death of Eldridge's daughter, Dayna Broussard, prompted the removal of the remaining 53 children in the organization's care and an investigation into the group. The investigation found that the children were subject to extreme fitness training and physical punishments, including floggings. Four EAA staff members were convicted of manslaughter, while Broussard and seven others were charged with child slavery by the federal government. Broussard died before the trial, while the other seven pleaded guilty to lesser charges.

== Founding ==
The Ecclesia Athletic Association (EAA) was founded in the Watts neighborhood of Los Angeles in 1975 as a sister organization to the Watts Christian Center, a church. Broussard had been a basketball star at Pacific University, was drafted by the Portland Trail Blazers, and was ordained a minister. He founded the Ecclesia Athletic Association with the goal to "lift children out of the dead-end ghetto life through athletic training and strict discipline". With the help of donations, which for some members amounted to their entire salaries, the church was able to buy an Avalon Boulevard bakery to serve as a commune.

In 1977 Broussard shifted his focus from the Watts Christian Center, which had lost most of its membership, to the Ecclesia Athletic Association, founded by himself and the few remaining members of the Christian Center. Ecclesia sponsored a successful 32-team basketball league, the largest in Los Angeles at the time, and Broussard's sister ran a school focusing on nutrition; children in the care of the Ecclesia Athletic Association stopped receiving formal schooling in 1984. By this time, accusations that the group was a cult were being made publicly. Broussard, who was called "The Coach" or "El" by members, denied Ecclesia was a cult, saying: "People who call us a cult group have never been [to the Avalon Boulevard building]. They have never examined us. They assume people are kept here because they see our discipline, because our kids walk in a straight line." The children were described as "hav[ing] a very clear picture in their minds that they don't want to be the same as other blacks in the Watts community". David Jackson, who was 14 when he and his mother Constance Jackson joined the EAA, credits Broussard with rescuing him from gangs, ""[Broussard] actually was the person that got me out of gangs in LA and...taught me that I have options..."

== Move to Oregon ==
Children of the EAA lined up in a row while Eldridge Broussard III (background) yells commands

The bulk of the group's members moved to Sandy, Oregon, in 1987, though they did maintain their Avalon Boulevard headquarters. The Sandy property offered a lot more space–18.5 acres (7.5 ha)–on which they planned to organically farm and to build a youth camp with pools and gymnasiums in order to train for the Olympics. Broussard told the neighbors they had a "plan for the welfare of a lost generation". The group quickly dropped their plans for a full youth camp after significant objection from neighbors. The group struggled to farm despite having expensive equipment, though Broussard would later claim the group had grown 91,000 pounds (41,000 kg) of produce.

By late 1988 Ecclesia housed 53 children ranging in age from six weeks to sixteen years, and the group had a second house in Clackamas, Oregon. The parents of these children were all members of the group; they had been forced to sign a vow of poverty upon joining the group which put themselves, their children, and their assets under Broussard's control. The group never formally registered in Oregon and did not have any sort of license or permission to school its children.

The life of EAA residents in Oregon was highly regimented, with the children training under the supervision of Broussard's oldest son, Eldridge Broussard III, who had been born in 1976. Ecclesia members publicly bragged about the physical fitness of the children in the group's Olympic training program, claiming they were capable of performing extensive calisthenics, including one to five thousand continuous jumping jacks and runs of up to ten miles. During a reporter's visit to Oregon, teens and adults were observed working long days in the fields, unable to talk or sing because it would, according to a group spokeswoman, lower productivity. Jackson, who was 18 and a trainer when the EAA moved to Oregon, described the conditions as basic.

Neighbors did not notice any signs of bruising or other scars when they saw the children. Some neighbors did experience unusual interactions with the children not seeing them play, and once having one of the children explain she was unable to speak to the neighbor who should instead talk to Ecclesia's minister of external affairs. Some neighbors feared the group was a cult reminiscent of the followers of Rajneesh, who had caused significant disruption in Wasco County in the 1980s with the establishment of the city of Rajneeshpuram. Their suspicions grew when Ecclesia began planting more crops and attempted to secure zoning permission to place more tents and outdoor toilets across its property in order to legally house 100 people.

Neighbors who suspected that the children were being abused repeatedly called authorities. These calls were initially dismissed by officials who felt the group was providing benefit by bringing children out of Watts. A deputy who was dispatched after several complaints found 50 children living in a sweltering garage but took no action, with the Oregon Children's Services Division also declining to investigate, as association members explained the children were in a training session and the agency found no problems with the "camp environment". In response to the complaints, Broussard reacted strongly in an open letter positively comparing their child rearing methods to those of parents who let their kids watch too much television or do drugs. Following an outcry at the zoning application by its neighbors, which included the public release of the vow of poverty, Ecclesia withdrew its application and announced that they were abandoning the property in October 1987. The group had also faced resistance from neighbors in Clackamas, where Broussard was informed his land was zoned for farming, not for housing large numbers of children.

== Death of Dayna Broussard ==
Members of Ecclesia began returning to the Sandy property between February and October 1988, with most of the children brought there around August. Neighbors reported not hearing any of the children or even seeing lights on in the house except very late at night. Sixty-two people, ranging in age from 1 to 37, were living in the four bedroom house, which had no toilets or refrigerator and no food except a few vegetables. On October 14, 1988, four members of Ecclesia, Willie K. Chambers, Brian James Brinson, Constance Zipporah Jackson, and Frederick Paul Doolittle, brought the body of Dayna Broussard, Eldridge's 8-year-old daughter and the second oldest of five children, to the Sandy fire station. The four were arrested and charged with manslaughter. Eldridge had been in Los Angeles at the time of his daughter's death.

While investigating the death of Dayna, child welfare officials learned that 42 of the 53 children, all those who were older than five, were subjected to beatings of at least 100 lashes, and sometimes as many as 800 lashes, with paddles, an electrical cord, and chains. A majority of those 42 were scarred from the punishments and malnourished. The children were also regularly forced to watch others being punished; many had watched the punishment of Dayna which led to her death. In an affidavit, officials described a "cruel and terrifying experience, giving rise to mental injury". The children were also regularly forced to go with limited food, sleep on the floor, and share only one or two working bathrooms. Authorities explained that no children had attempted to run away because Ecclesia was the only life they knew.

Broussard said that the conditions authorities found were due to inexperienced members being placed in charge of the children while he was away. He defended the punishments while talking about the beatings he had experienced from his father and the cultural differences between Watts and Oregon. Following his daughter's death, Broussard announced he was going to shut down both the Ecclesia Athletic Association and the Watts Christian Center. Broussard went on The Oprah Winfrey Show and denied that the EAA was a cult and explained that the methods were necessary to prepare the children for their lives in the city. Time magazine would characterize his appearance in the following way, "Grinning and smiling, smirking and haranguing, Broussard evaded all direct questions while blaming the death of his daughter on 'the media.' "

Despite Broussard announcing that it had been shut down, Ecclesia continued to operate. In the aftermath, Broussard's brother Alvin was arrested for beating a 10-year-old boy at their Watts headquarters. Prosecutors declined to charge Alvin with a felony. The Oregon Children's Services Division defended their failure to investigate, stating: "The issues raised were not neglect or child abuse, which is the only reasons we can go out in an investigation. They felt that the kids weren't being parented properly and that's not something we go out on. If we went out on every case of parenting skills, first of all we couldn't do it, and second, people would be angry at us".

== Removal of children to state care ==
Once in state care, most of the children were placed in two reform schools, with the remainder being placed in foster care. During this time, the children expressed more of a desire to see Broussard than their own parents. The children acted much younger than their age and had little in the way of traditional schooling, instead displaying biblical and fitness knowledge. The children were "abnormally quiet and compliant" when initially entering care, but became more rowdy when they discovered they would not be beaten for misbehaving. The state attempted to recoup over $30,000 ($79,761 in present US dollars) in costs of caring for the children removed from their parents, though the overall costs of the care were substantially more.

By the end of 1988, Oregon state officials wanted to return some children to California to live with relatives. These plans were complicated a few weeks later when the children's parents, who had been visiting their children, announced that they would stop visiting as they refused to renounce their connection to Ecclesia. Ecclesia faced its own roadblocks in reunification when a judge blocked its request in July 1989 to let the children participate in a summer camp. Officials also tried, unsuccessfully, to prevent the children from meeting with defense lawyers.

== Legal proceedings ==
The trial of Chambers, Brinson, Jackson, and Doolittle lasted three weeks. Many were angry that the defendants were only charged with manslaughter in Dayna's death, which the prosecutor explained by stating that more serious charges would have required more evidence of intent. During the trial, prosecutors said that Dayna's punishment stemmed from her stealing zucchini from another child and escalated from there. Several of the Ecclesia children testified that Dayna had been beaten 200 to 845 times, while children and adults testifying for the defense said it was 50 to 100 times. After a day of deliberation, the jury found all four defendants guilty of first-degree manslaughter. At the sentencing, Broussard asked the judge for clemency, but the four were sentenced to the maximum of 20 years. Brinson and Doolittle were eligible for parole in 40 months, Chambers and Jackson were eligible for parole in 10 years.

On February 7, 1991, Federal prosecutors indicted Broussard, his brother Alvin, Chambers, Jackson, and four others for child slavery under the 13th Amendment, and denying children their civil rights. Stephen Peifer, an Assistant U.S. Attorney who was involved in prosecuting the case, called Ecclesia "the largest child slavery ring in the history of the United States". While still awaiting trial, Broussard, who had become more reclusive following the indictments and convictions, died of complications from diabetes on September 5, 1991. On January 17, 1992, the remaining seven "pleaded guilty ... to lesser charges and were given prison terms ranging from 2 1/4 to 8 years".

Brinson was released early from his 20-year prison sentence. In 2002 he was charged with several counts of sexual abuse and found guilty of one count. The charges were unrelated to his involvement in Ecclesia. In May 2013, he was shot to death by three teenagers during a robbery attempt.
