= Air Rajneesh =

1981–1985 American airline

- Commenced operations: 1981; 45 years ago
- Ceased operations: 1985; 41 years ago
- Operating bases: Big Muddy Ranch Airport
- Destinations: Unknown

Air Rajneesh was a carrier based at Big Muddy Ranch Airport from 1981 to 1985.

There is very little known about the operations of Air Rajneesh except that its primary purpose was to bring cargo and new disciples to the Rajneeshee commune. The Director of Operations was Ma Prem Patipada.

== Fleet ==
The known aircraft in Air Rajneesh's fleet, as of 1984, were:

- 3 DC-3s
- 1 Convair 240 (once owned by Howard Hughes)
- 1 BN-2 Islander (the first plane added to Air Rajneesh)
- 1 Helicopter (Military style)

== Gallery ==
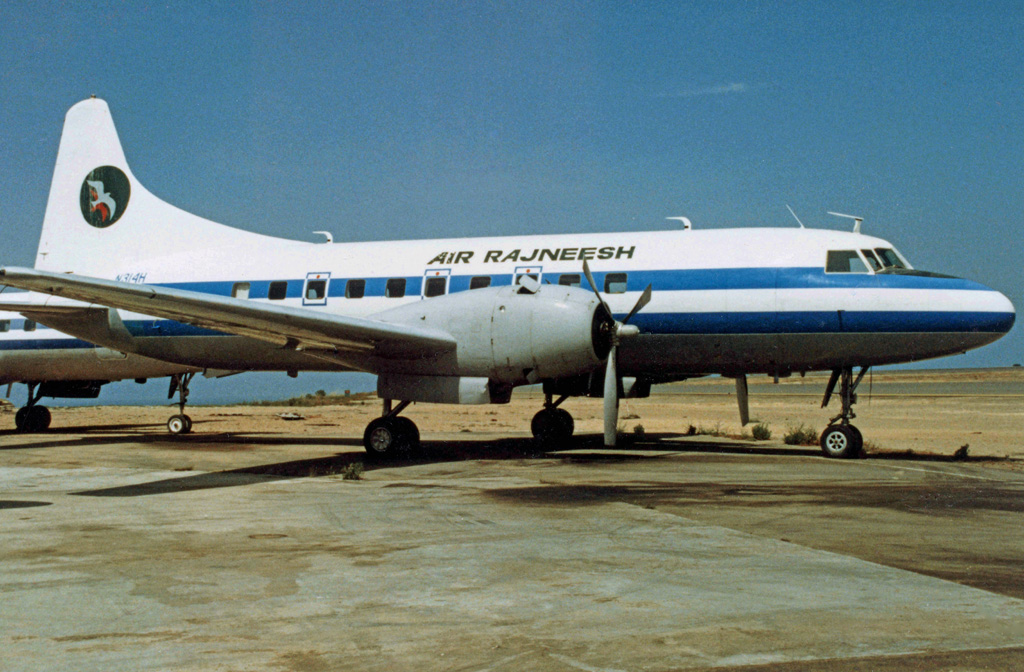
An Air Rajneesh Convair 240 at Big Muddy Ranch Airport

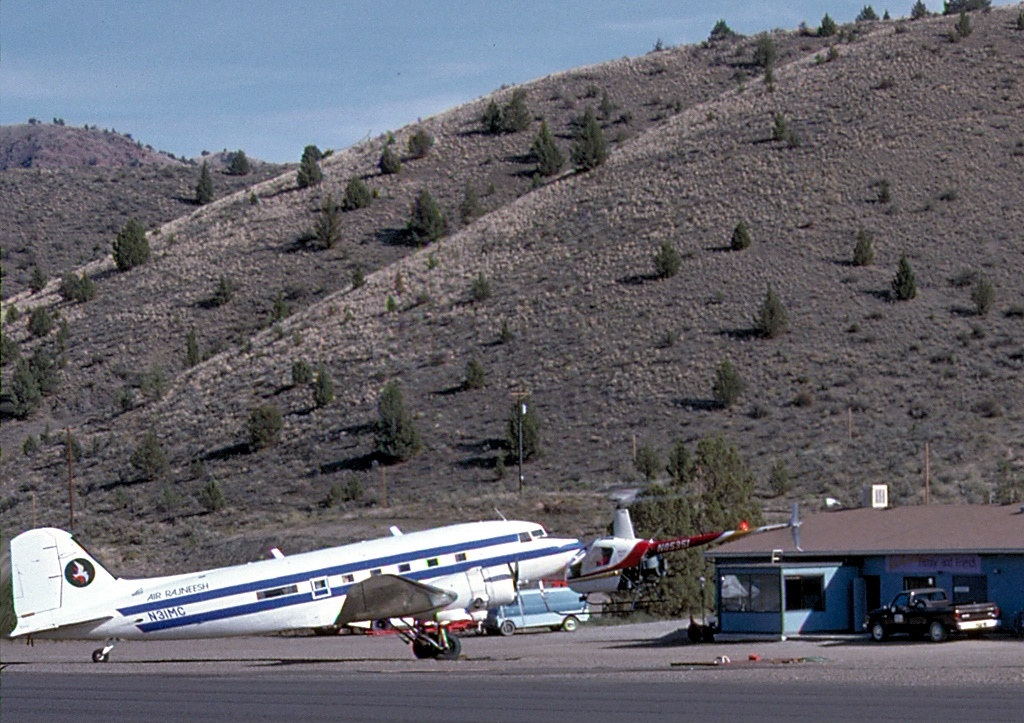
An Air Rajneesh Douglas DC-3 at Big Muddy Ranch Airport

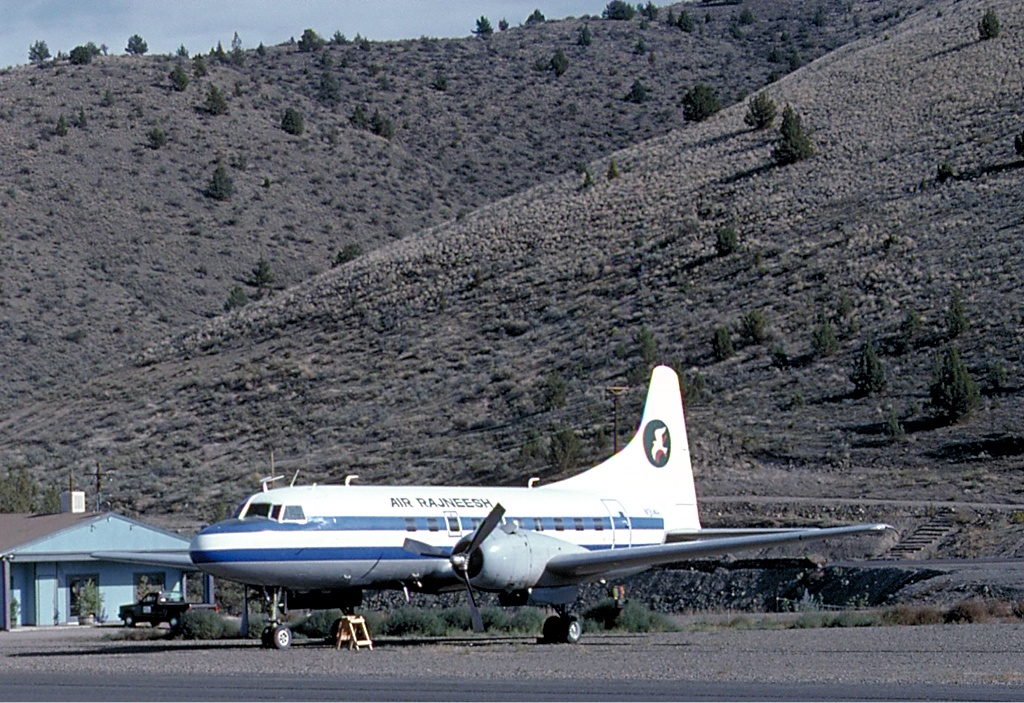
Another Air Rajneesh Convair 440

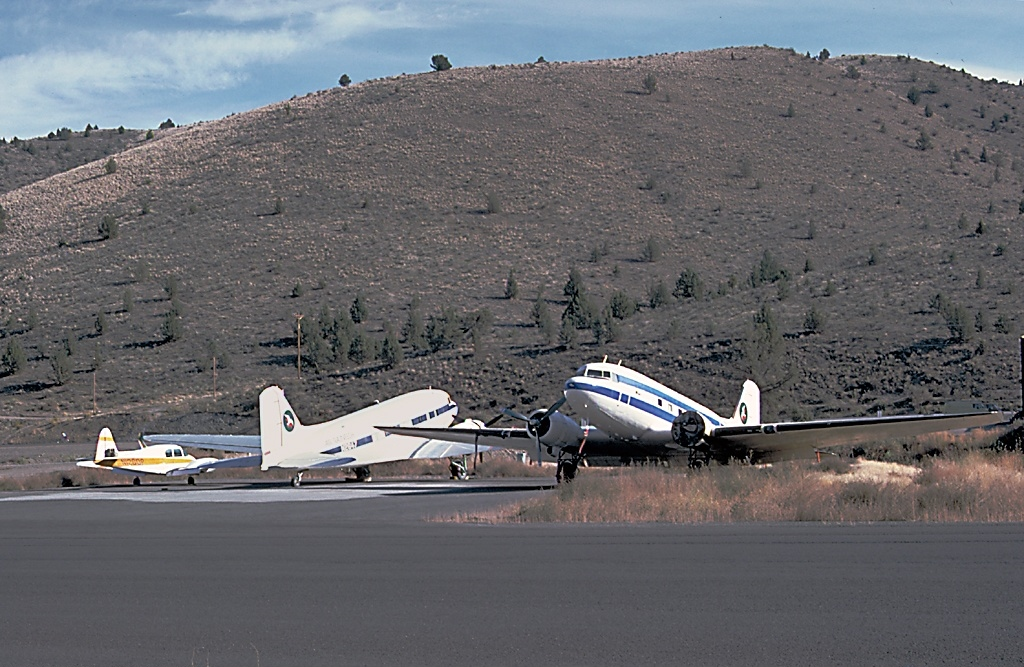
Some Air Rajneesh DC-3s

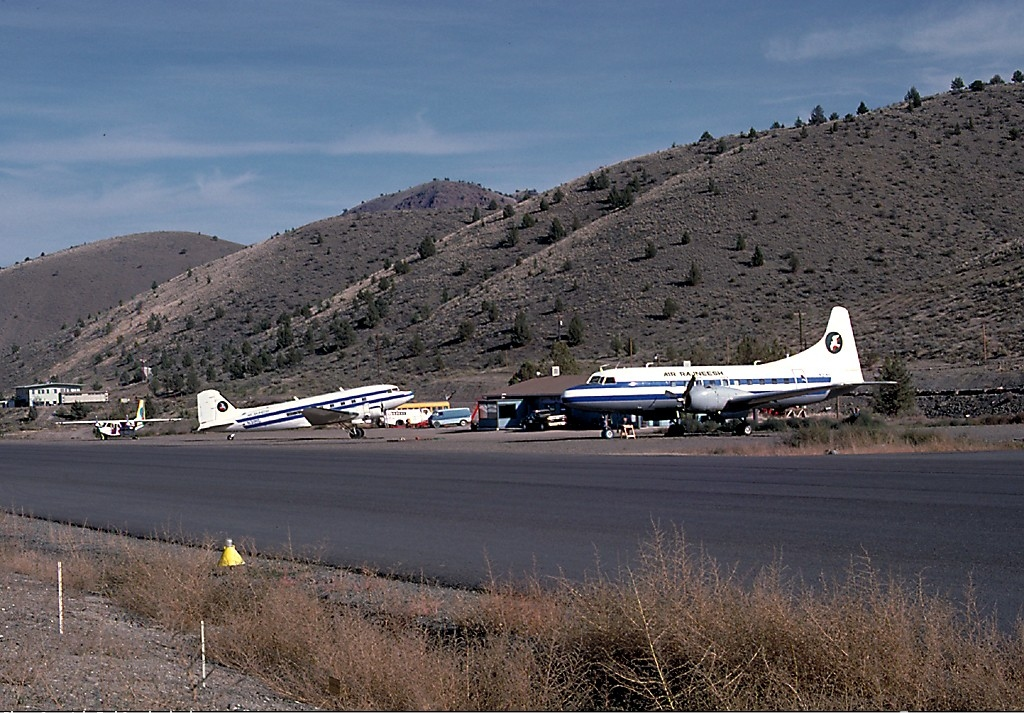
Big Muddy Ranch Airport with two aircraft
