= 1984 Rajneeshee bioterror attack =

Deliberate food contamination in the US

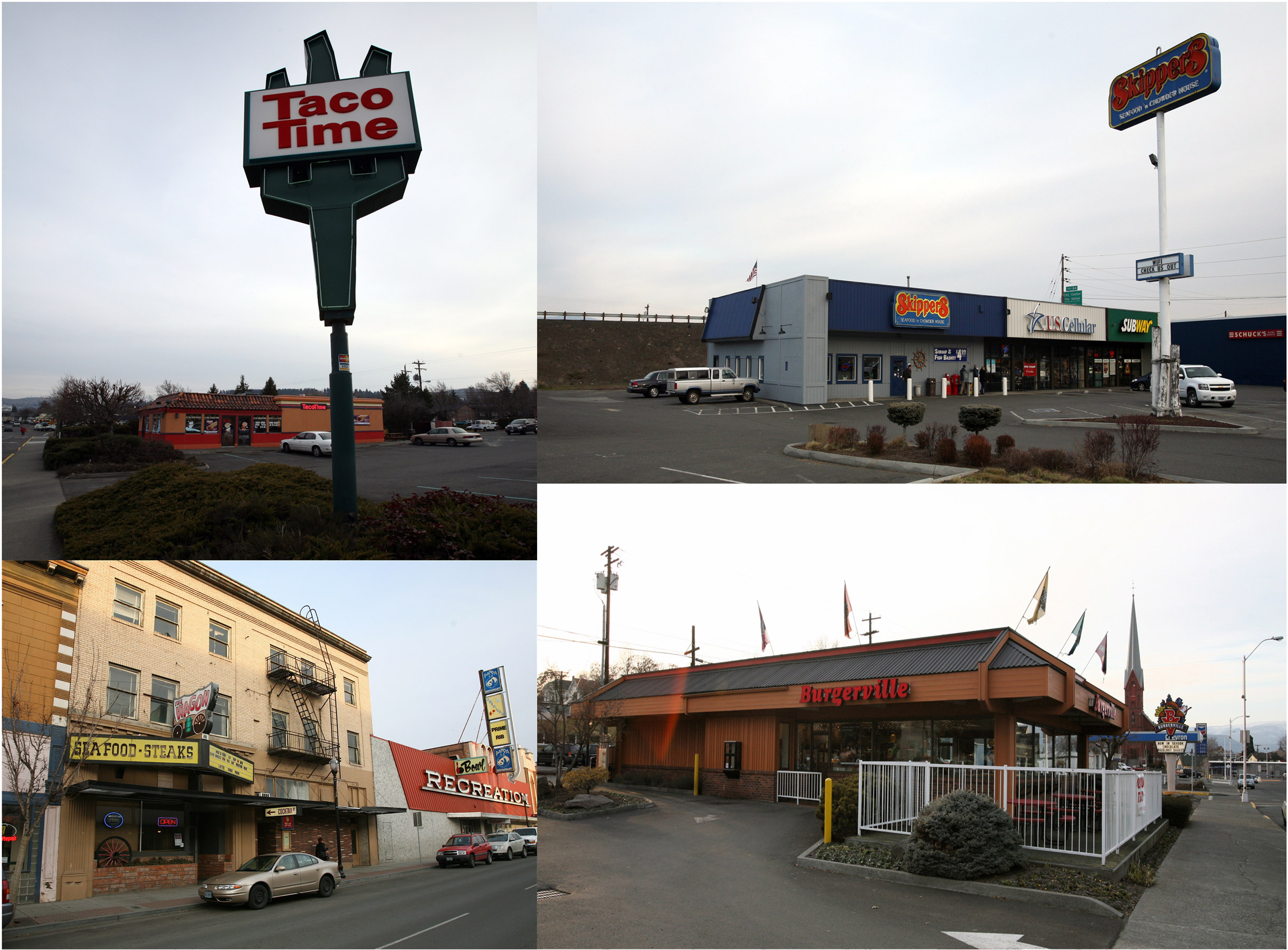
- Four of the restaurants in The Dalles affected by the attack
- Location: 45°36′4″N 121°10′58″W; The Dalles, Oregon, U.S.
- Date: August 29 – October 10, 1984
- Target: Voting population, Wasco County
- Attack type: Bioterrorism
- Weapon: Salmonella enterica Typhimurium
- Injuries: 751 people infected, 45 hospitalizations
- Perpetrator: Rajneeshee commune management

In 1984, 751 people suffered food poisoning in The Dalles, Oregon, United States, due to the deliberate contamination of salad bars at ten local restaurants with Salmonella. A group of prominent followers of Rajneesh (also known as Osho) led by Ma Anand Sheela had hoped to incapacitate the voting population of the city so that their own candidates would win the 1984 Wasco County elections. The incident was the first and largest bioterrorist attack in U.S. history.

Rajneesh's followers had previously gained political control of Antelope, Oregon, as they were based in the nearby intentional community of Rajneeshpuram, and they now sought election to two of the three seats on the Wasco County Circuit Court that were up for election in November 1984. Some Rajneeshpuram officials feared that they would not get enough votes, so they decided to incapacitate voters in The Dalles, the largest population center in Wasco County. The chosen biological agent was Salmonella enterica of the Typhimurium serotype, which was first delivered through glasses of water to two county commissioners and then at salad bars and in salad dressing.

As a result of the attack, 751 people contracted salmonellosis, 45 of whom were hospitalized, but none died. An initial investigation by the Oregon Health Authority and the Centers for Disease Control did not rule out deliberate contamination, and the agents and contamination were confirmed a year later, on February 28, 1985. Congressman James H. Weaver gave a speech in the U.S. House of Representatives in which he "accused the Rajneeshees of sprinkling Salmonella culture on salad bar ingredients in eight restaurants".

At a press conference in September 1985, Rajneesh accused several of his followers of participation in this and other crimes, including an aborted plan in 1985 to assassinate a United States Attorney, and he asked state and federal authorities to investigate. Oregon Attorney General David B. Frohnmayer set up an inter-agency task force composed of Oregon State Police and the Federal Bureau of Investigation, and executed search warrants in Rajneeshpuram. A sample of bacteria was found in a Rajneeshpuram medical laboratory which matched the contaminant that had sickened the town residents. Two leading Rajneeshpuram officials were convicted on charges of attempted murder and served 29 months of 20-year sentences in a minimum-security federal prison.

== Planning ==
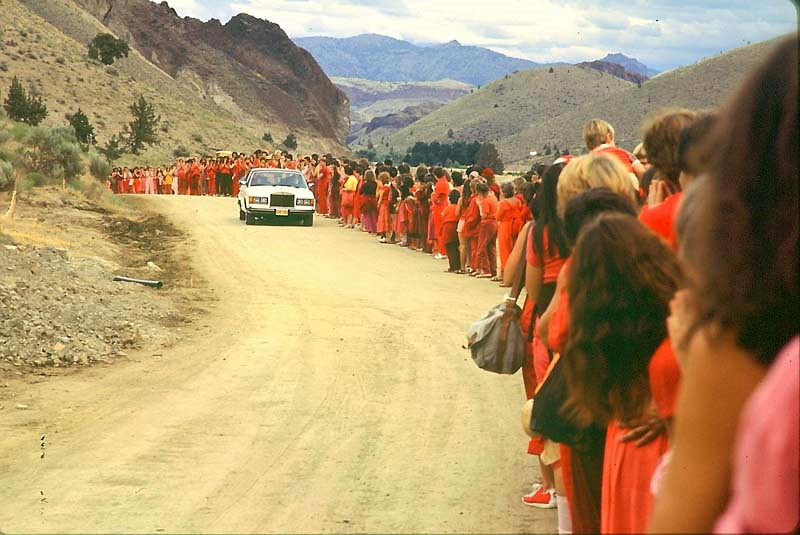
Rajneesh in his luxury Rolls-Royce greeted by sannyasins on one of his daily "drive-bys" in Rajneeshpuram, 1982

In 1981, several thousand of Rajneesh's followers had moved onto the "Big Muddy Ranch" in rural Wasco County, Oregon, where they later incorporated as an intentional community called "Rajneeshpuram". They had taken political control of the small nearby town of Antelope, Oregon (population 75), the name of which they changed to "Rajneesh". The group had started on friendly terms with the local population, but relations soon degraded because of land-use conflicts and the commune's dramatic expansion.

After being denied building permits for Rajneeshpuram, the commune leadership sought to gain political control over the rest of the county by influencing the November 1984 county election. Their goal was to win two of three seats on the Wasco county commission, as well as the sheriff's office. Their attempts to influence the election included the "Share-a-Home" program, in which they transported thousands of homeless people to Rajneeshpuram and attempted to register them to vote to inflate the constituency of voters for the group's candidates. The Wasco County clerk countered this attempt by enforcing a regulation that required all new voters to submit their qualifications when registering to vote.

The commune leadership planned to sicken and incapacitate voters in The Dalles, where most of the county's voters resided, to sway the election. Approximately twelve people were involved in the plots to employ biological agents, and at least eleven were involved in planning them. No more than four appear to have been involved in development at the Rajneeshpuram medical laboratory; not all of those were necessarily aware of the objectives of their work. At least eight individuals helped spread the bacteria.

The main planners of the attack included Sheela Silverman (Ma Anand Sheela), Rajneesh's chief lieutenant, and Diane Yvonne Onang (Ma Anand Puja), a nurse practitioner and secretary-treasurer of the Rajneesh Medical Corporation. They purchased Salmonella bacteria from a medical supply company in Seattle, Washington, and staff cultured it in labs within the commune. They contaminated the produce at the salad bars as a "trial run". The group also tried to introduce pathogens into The Dalles' water system. If successful, they planned to use the same techniques closer to Election Day. They did not carry out the second part of the plan. The commune decided to boycott the election when it became clear that those brought in through the "Share-a-Home" program would not be allowed to vote.

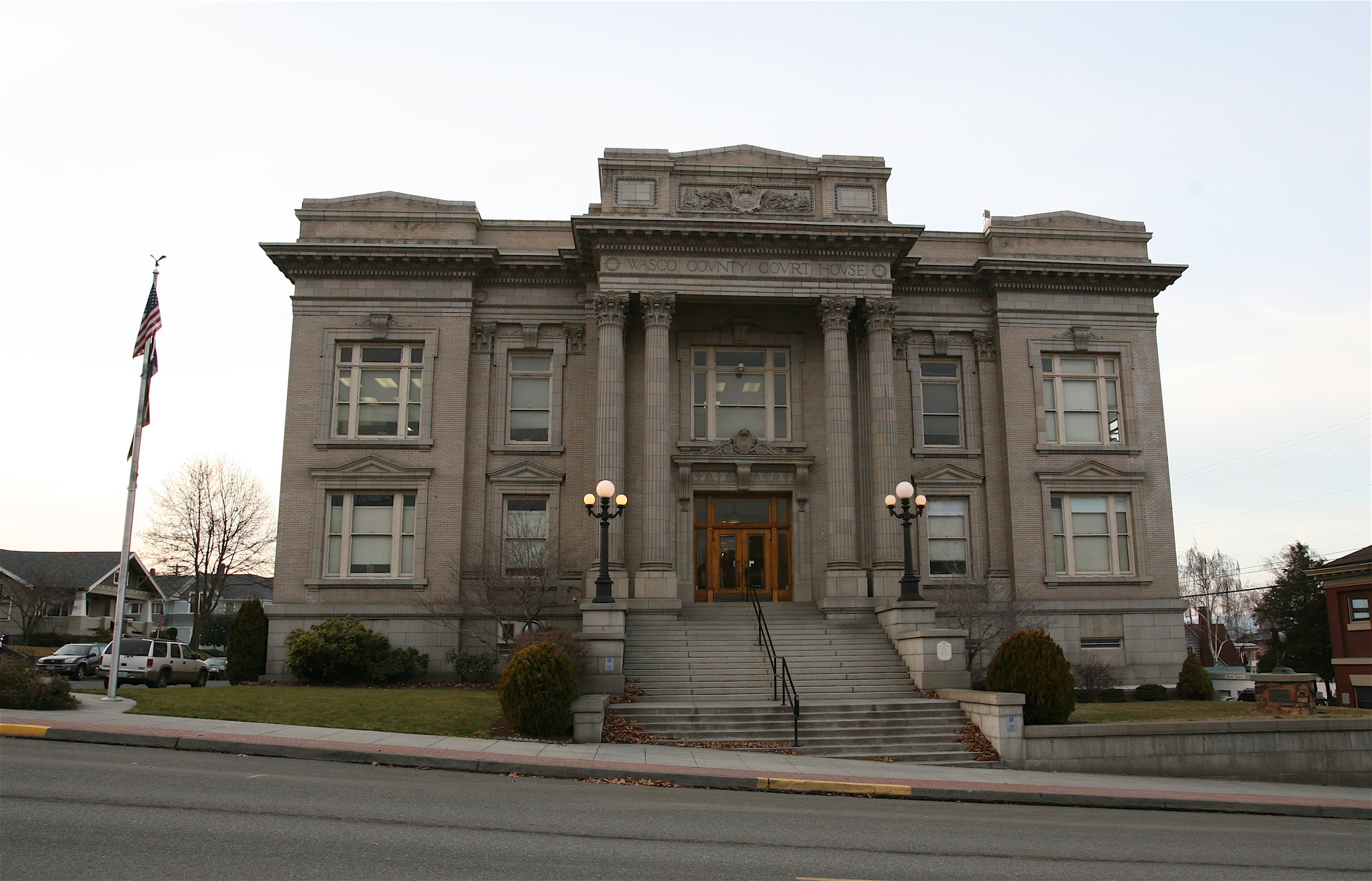
Perpetrators spread Salmonella contaminants on surfaces in the Wasco County Courthouse

Two visiting Wasco County commissioners were infected via glasses of water containing Salmonella bacteria during a visit to Rajneeshpuram on August 29, 1984. Both men fell ill and one was hospitalized. Afterward, members of Sheela's team spread Salmonella on produce in grocery stores and on doorknobs and urinal handles in the county courthouse, but these actions did not produce the desired effects. In September and October 1984, they contaminated the salad bars of ten local restaurants with Salmonella, infecting 751 people. Forty-five people received hospital treatment; all survived.

The primary delivery tactic involved one member concealing a plastic bag containing a light-brown liquid with the Salmonella bacteria (referred to by the perpetrators as "salsa"), and either spreading it over the food at a salad bar, or pouring it into salad dressing. By September 24, 1984, more than 150 people were violently ill. By the end of September, 751 cases of acute gastroenteritis were documented; lab testing determined that all of the victims were infected with Salmonella enterica Typhimurium. Symptoms included diarrhea, fever, chills, nausea, vomiting, headaches, abdominal pain, and bloody stools. Victims ranged in age from an infant, born two days after his mother's infection and initially given a five percent chance of survival, to an 87-year-old.

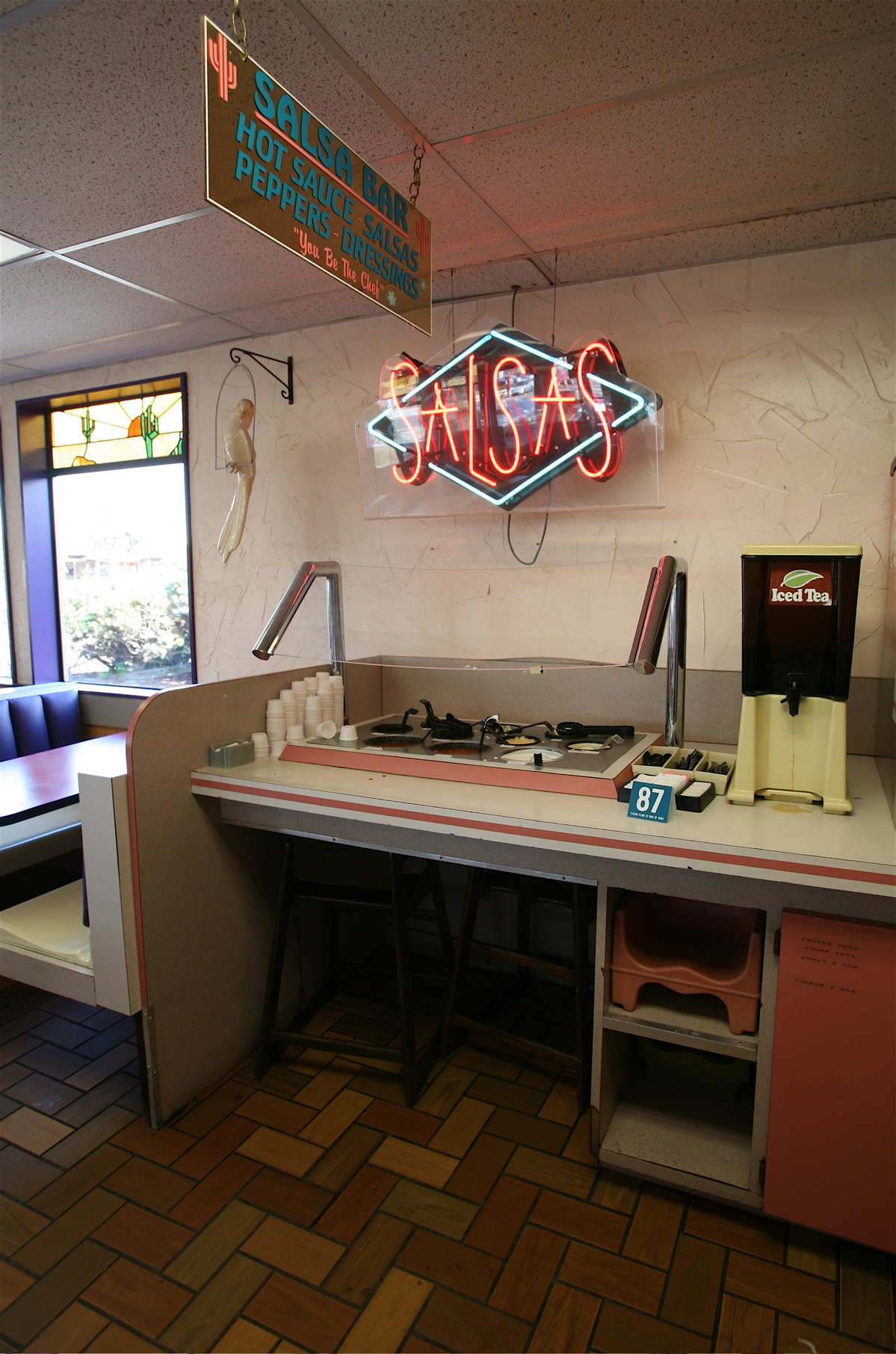
The salsa bar of The Dalles' Taco Time

Local residents suspected that Rajneesh's followers were behind the poisonings. They turned out in droves on Election Day to prevent the cult from winning any county positions, thus rendering the plot unsuccessful. The Rajneeshees eventually withdrew their candidate from the November 1984 ballot. Only 239 of the commune's 7,000 residents voted; most were not U.S. citizens and could not vote. The outbreak cost local restaurants hundreds of thousands of dollars and health officials shut down the salad bars of the affected establishments. Some residents feared further attacks and stayed at home. One resident said: "People were so horrified and scared. People wouldn't go out, they wouldn't go out alone. People were becoming prisoners."

== Investigation ==
Officials and investigators from a number of different state and federal agencies investigated the outbreak. Michael Skeels, director of the Oregon State Public Health Laboratory at the time, said that the incident provoked such a large public health investigation because "it was the largest food-related outbreak in the U.S. in 1984". The investigation identified the bacteria as Salmonella enterica Typhimurium and initially concluded that the outbreak had been due to food handlers' poor personal hygiene. Workers preparing food at the affected restaurants had fallen ill before most patrons had.

Oregon Democratic Congressman James H. Weaver continued to investigate because he believed that the officials' conclusion did not adequately explain the facts. He contacted physicians at the Centers for Disease Control and Prevention (CDC) and other agencies and urged them to investigate Rajneeshpuram. According to Lewis F. Carter's book Charisma and Control in Rajneeshpuram, "many treated his concern" as paranoid or as an example of "Rajneeshee bashing". On February 28, 1985, Weaver gave a speech at the U.S. House of Representatives in which he accused the Rajneeshees of contaminating salad bar ingredients in eight restaurants. As events later showed, Weaver had presented a well-reasoned, if only circumstantial, case; these circumstantial elements were confirmed by evidence found after investigators gained access to Rajneeshpuram several months later.

Months later, starting on September 16, 1985, Rajneesh, who had recently emerged from a four-year period of public silence and self-imposed isolation (although he had continued to meet with his assistant) at the commune, convened press conferences: he stated that Sheela and nineteen other commune leaders, including Puja, had left Rajneeshpuram over the weekend and gone to Europe. He said that he had received information from commune residents that Sheela and her team had committed a number of serious crimes. Calling them a "gang of fascists", he said they had tried to poison his doctor and Rajneesh's female companion, as well as the Jefferson County district attorney and the water system in The Dalles. Rajneesh voiced suspicions that they had poisoned a county commissioner and Judge William Hulse, and that they may have been responsible for the salmonellosis outbreak in The Dalles. He invited state and federal law enforcement officials to Rajneeshpuram to investigate. His allegations were initially greeted with skepticism by outside observers.

Oregon Attorney General David B. Frohnmayer established a task force among the Wasco County Sheriff's office, the Oregon State Police, the Federal Bureau of Investigation (FBI), the Immigration and Naturalization Service (INS) and the National Guard that set up headquarters at Rajneeshpuram to investigate the allegations. They obtained search warrants and subpoenas; 50 investigators entered the ranch on October 2, 1985. Skeels found glass vials containing Salmonella "bactrol disks" in the laboratory of a Rajneeshpuram medical clinic. Analysis by the CDC lab in Atlanta confirmed that the bacteria from the Rajneesh laboratory were an exact match to those that sickened individuals who had eaten at local restaurants.

The investigation also revealed experimentation at Rajneeshpuram with poisons, chemicals and bacteria which had been carried out during 1984 and 1985. Skeels described the scene at the Rajneesh laboratory as "a bacteriological freezer-dryer for large-scale production" of microbes. Investigators found a copy of The Anarchist Cookbook, and literature on the manufacture and usage of explosives and military bio-warfare. Investigators believed that the commune had previously carried out similar attacks in Salem, Portland and other cities in Oregon. According to court testimony, the plotters boasted that they had attacked a nursing home and a salad bar at the Mid-Columbia Medical Center, but no such attempts were ever proven in court. As a result of the bioterrorism investigation, law enforcement officials discovered that there had been an aborted plot by Rajneeshees to murder Charles Turner, a former United States Attorney for Oregon. An invoice dated September 25, 1984, from the American Type Culture Collection of microbes was discovered, showing an order received by the Rajneeshpuram laboratory for Salmonella typhi, the bacterium that causes the life-threatening illness typhoid fever.

== Prosecution ==
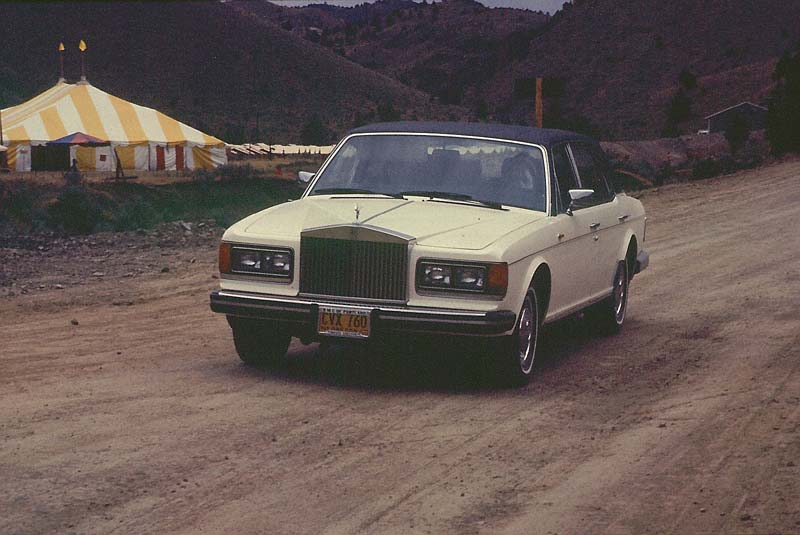
Rajneesh driving one of his Rolls-Royce cars in 1982. Sheela claimed to have discussed the plot with him, but this was never proven.

The mayor of Rajneeshpuram, David Berry Knapp (Swami Krishna Deva; also known as KD), turned state's evidence and gave an account of his knowledge of the Salmonella attack to the FBI. He claimed that Sheela said "she had talked with [Rajneesh] about the plot to decrease voter turnout in The Dalles by making people sick. Sheela said that [Rajneesh] commented that it was best not to hurt people, but if a few died not to worry." In Miller's Germs: Biological Weapons and America's Secret War, this statement is attributed to Sheela. According to KD's testimony, she played doubters a tape of Rajneesh's muffled voice saying, "if it was necessary to do things to preserve [his] vision, then do it," and interpreted this to mean that murder in his name was fine, telling doubters "not to worry" if a few people had to die. According to the account of Satya Bharti Franklin, when writing about theories about tapes Sheela claimed to have, "As many of us knew, she'd had a wide variety of Bhagwan's discourse tapes edited over the years until they said only what she wanted them to say, while ashram/ranch videos and films had been judiously spliced and edited, rewriting history. It was a process many of us, including me, had been involved with in one way or another. Whatever tapes she had in her possession proved nothing."

John Jay Shelfer (Swami Prem Jayananda), Sheela's husband at Rajneeshpuram, recalled in 2020 that "Sheela was very good at framing the issues in a way that would invite Osho's approval of whatever she approved to do. She might ask a general, broad question, get an answer, and then, she would go back and use that as Osho authorising whatever it was that she wanted to do. She would provide and limit information as it would help support what she wanted."

According to a 1994 study published in the journal Sociology of Religion, "[m]ost sannyasins indicated that they believed that [Rajneesh] knew about Ma Anand Sheela's illegal activities." Frances FitzGerald writes in Cities on a Hill that most of Rajneesh's followers "believed [him] incapable of doing, or willing, violence against another person", and that almost all thought the responsibility for the criminality was Sheela's—according to FitzGerald, the followers believed the guru had not known anything about it. Carus writes in Toxic Terror that "There is no way to know to what extent [Rajneesh] participated in actual decision-making. His followers believed he was involved in every important decision that Sheela made, but those allegations were never proven." Rajneesh insisted that Sheela, who he said was his only source of information during his period of isolation, used her position to impose "a fascist state" on the commune. He acknowledged that the key to her actions was his silence.

Rajneesh left Oregon by plane on October 27, 1985, and was arrested when he landed in Charlotte, North Carolina, and charged with 35 counts of deliberate violations of immigration laws. As part of a plea agreement, he pleaded guilty to two counts of making false statements to immigration officials. Rajneesh received a ten-year suspended sentence and a fine of US$400,000, and was deported and barred from reentering the U.S. for a period of five years. He was never prosecuted for crimes related to the Salmonella attack.

Sheela and Puja were arrested in West Germany on October 28, 1985. After protracted negotiations between the two governments, they were extradited to the U.S., reaching Portland on February 6, 1986. They were charged with attempting to murder Rajneesh's personal physician, first-degree assault for poisoning Judge William Hulse, second-degree assault for poisoning The Dalles Commissioner Raymond Matthews, and product tampering for the poisonings in The Dalles, as well as wiretapping and immigration offenses. The U.S. Attorney's office handled the prosecution of the poisoning cases related to the ten restaurants, and the Oregon Attorney General's office prosecuted the poisoning cases of Commissioner Matthews and Judge Hulse.

On July 22, 1986, both women entered Alford pleas for the Salmonella attack and the other charges, and received sentences ranging from three to twenty years, to be served concurrently. Sheela received 20 years for the attempted murder of Rajneesh's physician, 20 years for first-degree assault in the poisoning of Judge Hulse, ten years for second-degree assault in the poisoning of Commissioner Matthews, 4 1/2 years for her role in the attack, 4 1/2 years for the wiretapping conspiracy, and five years' probation for immigration fraud; Puja received fifteen, fifteen, 7 1/2, and 4 1/2 years, respectively, for her role in the first four of these crimes, as well as three years' probation for the wiretapping conspiracy. Both Sheela and Puja were released on parole early for good behavior, after serving twenty-nine months of their sentences in a minimum-security federal prison. Sheela's green card was revoked; she moved to Switzerland. She remarried there and went on to run two nursing homes.

== Aftermath ==
The Rajneeshees committed the most significant crimes of their kind in the history of the United States ... The largest single incident of fraudulent marriages, the most massive scheme of wiretapping and bugging, and the largest mass poisoning.

— Oregon Attorney General Dave Frohnmayer

The Oregonian ran a 20-part series on Rajneesh's movement, beginning in June 1985, which included an investigation into the Salmonella incident. As a result of a follow-up investigation, The Oregonian learned that Leslie L. Zaitz, one of their investigative journalists, had been placed as number three on a top-ten hit list by Sheela's group. Frohnmayer commented on the poisoning incident and other acts perpetrated by the group, stating: "The Rajneeshees committed the most significant crimes of their kind in the history of the United States ... The largest single incident of fraudulent marriages, the most massive scheme of wiretapping and bugging, and the largest mass poisoning." Looking back on the incident, Skeels stated, "We lost our innocence over this ... We really learned to be more suspicious ... The first significant biological attack on a U.S. community was not carried out by foreign terrorists smuggled into New York, but by legal residents of a U.S. community. The next time it happens it could be with more lethal agents ... We in public health are really not ready to deal with that."

Milton Leitenberg noted in the 2005 work Assessing the Biological Weapons and Bioterrorism Threat, "there is apparently no other 'terrorist' group that is known to have successfully cultured any pathogen." Federal and state investigators requested that details of the incident not be published in the Journal of the American Medical Association (JAMA) for twelve years, for they feared a description of the events could spark copycat crimes, and JAMA complied. No repeat attacks or hoaxes subsequently occurred, and a detailed account of the incident and investigation was published in JAMA in 1997. A 1999 empirical analysis in the journal Emerging Infectious Diseases published by the CDC described six motivational factors associated with bioterrorism, including: charismatic leadership, no outside constituency, apocalyptic ideology, loner or splinter group, sense of paranoia and grandiosity, and defensive aggression. According to the article, the "Rajneesh Cult" satisfied all motivational factors except for an "apocalyptic ideology". An analysis in the book Cults, Religion and Violence disputes the link to charismatic leadership, pointing out that in this and other cases, it was organizational lieutenants who played a pivotal role in the initiation of violence. Arguing for a contextual rather than decisive view of charisma, the authors state that the attribution of outcomes to the personality of a single individual, even a charismatic leader, usually camouflages a far more complex field of social relationships.

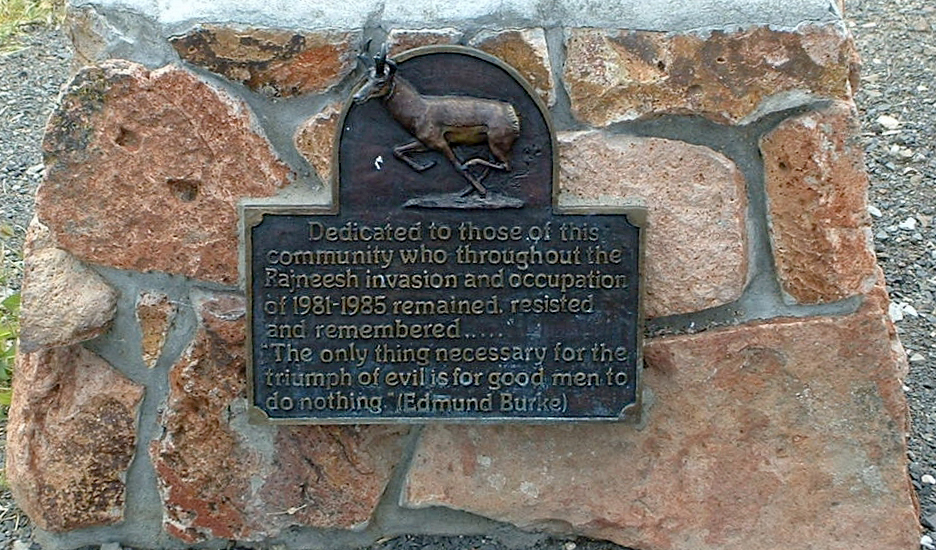
A plaque at the Antelope post office commemorates local resistance to the "Rajneesh invasion".

U.S. media revisited the incident during the 2001 anthrax attacks. The 2001 publication of Judith Miller's Germs: Biological Weapons and America's Secret War, which contained an analysis and detailed description of the events, also brought discussion of the incident back into the news. Residents of The Dalles commented that they have an understanding of how bioterrorism can occur in the United States. The incident had spread fear in the community, and drained the local economy; all but one of the restaurants affected went out of business. In 2005, the Oregon State Land Board agreed to sell 480 acres (1.9 km^{2}) of Wasco County, including Rajneeshpuram, to the Colorado-based youth ministry Young Life. On February 18, 2005, Court TV aired an episode of Forensic Files about the incident, "'Bio-Attack' – Oregon Cult Poisonings". The salmonellosis outbreak was also discussed in the media within the context of the 2006 North American E. coli outbreak.

The book Emerging Infectious Diseases: Trends and Issues cites the 1984 Rajneeshee bioterror attack, along with the Aum Shinrikyo group's attempts to use anthrax and other agents, as exceptions to the belief "that only foreign-state supported groups have the resources to execute a credible bioterrorism event". According to Deadly Cultures: Biological Weapons Since 1945, these are the only two confirmed uses of biological weapons for terrorist purposes to harm humans. The incident was the single largest bioterrorist attack in U.S. history. In the chapter "Influencing An Election: America's First Modern Bioterrorist Attack" in his 2006 book Terrorism on American Soil: A Concise History of Plots and Perpetrators from the Famous to the Forgotten, author Joseph T. McCann concludes: "In every respect, the Salmonella attack carried out by the cult members was a major bioterrorist attack that fortunately failed to achieve its ultimate goal and resulted in no fatalities." According to scholar Syed Adrian Ali Shah, the attack was an act of Hindu terrorism.

== See also ==
- 1985 Rajneeshee assassination plot – Assassination plot in Portland, Oregon
- 2001 anthrax attacks – Bioterrorist attacks in the United States
- Attacks on the United States
- List of terrorist incidents
- Terrorism in the United States
- Wild Wild Country – 2018 documentary on Rajneeshpuram that covers the bioterror attack
