= Rajneeshpuram =

1981–1985 religious intentional community in Oregon, US

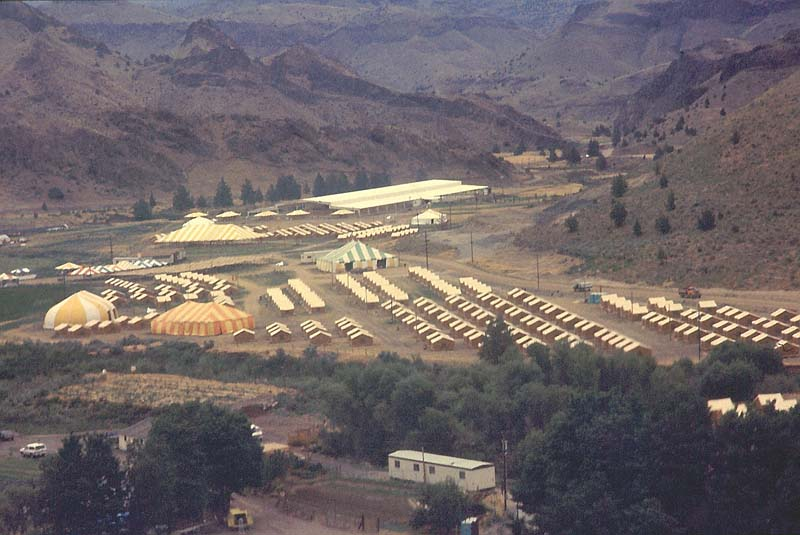
- Rajneeshpuram in 1983
- Etymology: From Hindi: Rajneesh's village
- Location within Oregon
- Coordinates: 44.842°N 120.482°W
- Established: June 1981
- Disbanded: De facto: November 1985; De Jure 1988

Government
  - Type: Theocracy
  - Bhagwan: Rajneesh
  - President of the Rajneesh International Foundation: Ma Anand Sheela (1981–1985); Ma Prem Hasya (1985–1986)
  - Mayor of Rajneeshpuram: David Berry Knapp (1982–1985); Philip Toelkes (1985–1986)

Population (1984)
  - Total: Approximately 7,000

Rajneeshpuram (also called Rancho Rajneesh) was a religious intentional community in the northwest United States, located in Wasco County, Oregon. Incorporated as a city between 1981 and 1988, its population consisted entirely of Rajneeshees, followers of the spiritual teacher Bhagwan Shree Rajneesh, later known as Osho.

The town is notable as some of its citizens and leaders were responsible for launching the 1984 Rajneeshee bioterror attacks, as well as the planned 1985 Rajneeshee assassination plot, in which they conspired to assassinate Charles Turner, the United States Attorney for the District of Oregon among others. The town faced numerous controversies and conflicts with Oregonians and local authorities. Additionally, the town was known for its World Celebrations which drew thousands of visitors a year.

== Settlement ==
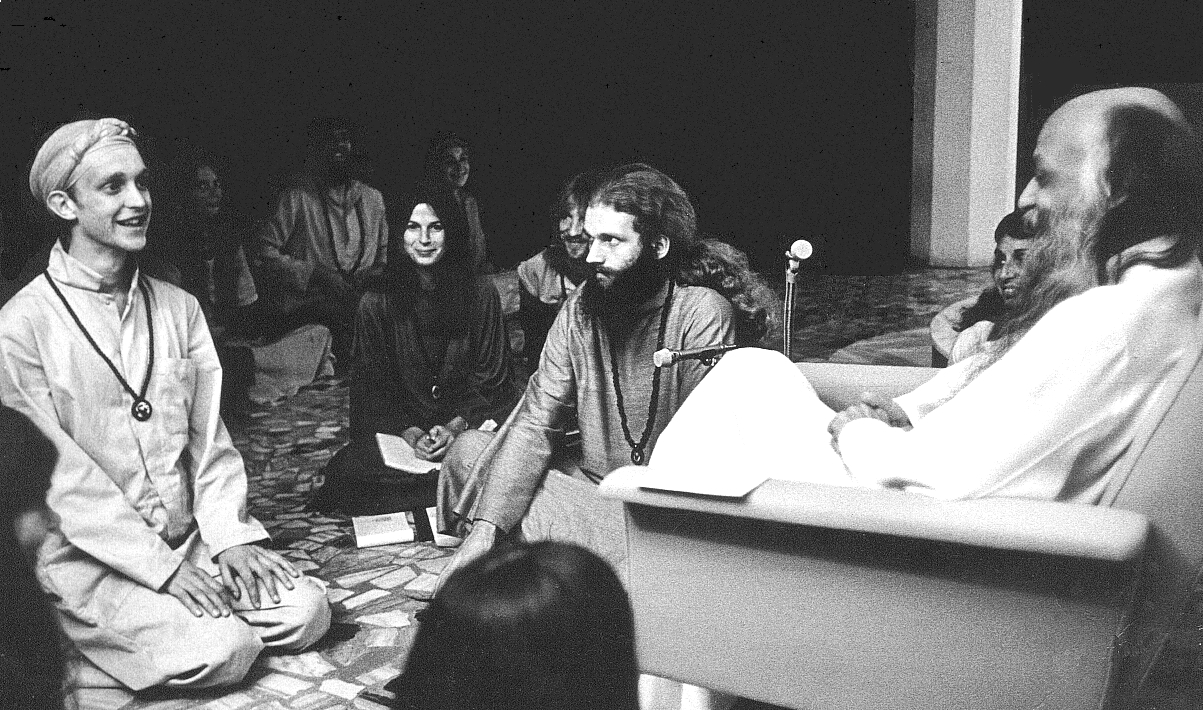
Bhagwan Shree Rajneesh and his followers in Pune, India. 1977.

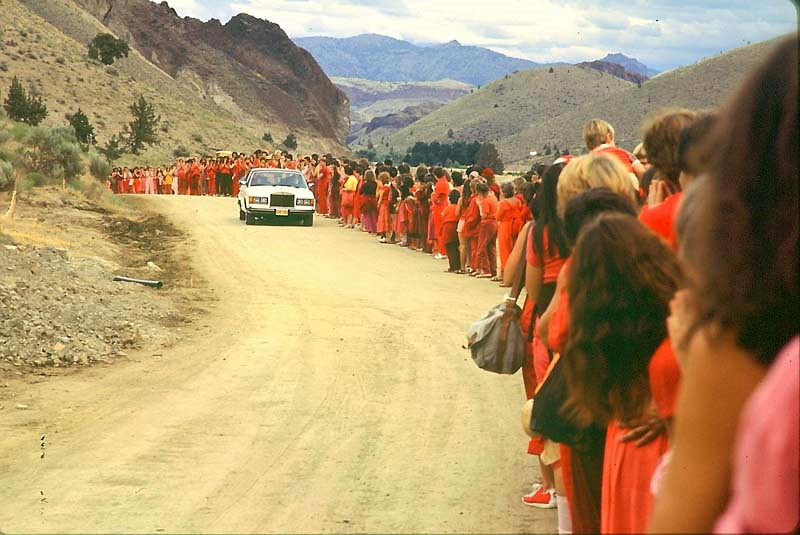
Rajneesh greeted by followers on one of his daily "drive-bys" in Rajneeshpuram. Circa 1982.

Following a bombing over land use in their ashram in Pune (formerly Poona), the founder of the Rajneesh movement, Bhagwan Shree Rajneesh, recruited Ma Anand Sheela to leave India to form a new religious settlement in the United States, which seemingly promised religious freedom and better opportunities. Discussions of this new settlement began as early as 1980, but Rajneesh did not relocate until May 1981, when he traveled to the United States on a tourist visa issued for medical purposes.

Rajneeshpuram was on the site of a 64,281-acre (100 sq mi; 260 km^{2}) central Oregon property then-known as the Big Muddy Ranch, near Antelope, which was purchased by Sheela's then-husband, John Shelfer (also known as Prem Jayanada), in 1981 for $5.75 million ($20.4 million in today's dollars). Within a year of arriving, the commune's leaders had become embroiled in a series of legal battles with their neighbors, primarily over land use. They had initially stated that they were planning to create a small agricultural community, their land being zoned for agricultural use, but it soon became apparent that they wanted to establish the kind of infrastructure and services normally associated with a town.

Within three years, the neo-sannyasins (Rajneesh's followers, also termed Rajneeshees or sannyasins in contemporaneous press reports) developed a community, turning the ranch from an empty rural property into a city of up to 7,000 people, complete with typical urban infrastructure such as a fire department, police, restaurants, malls, townhouses, a 4,200-foot (1,300 m) airstrip, a public transport system using buses, a sewage reclamation plant, a reservoir, and a post office with the ZIP code 97741. It is thought that the actual population during this time was potentially much higher than they claimed, and the neo-sannyasins may have gone as far as to hide beds and citizens during investigations. Various legal conflicts, primarily over land use, escalated to bitter hostility between the commune and local residents, and the commune was subject to sustained and coordinated pressures from various coalitions of Oregon residents over the length of its existence.

== Tensions and conflict ==
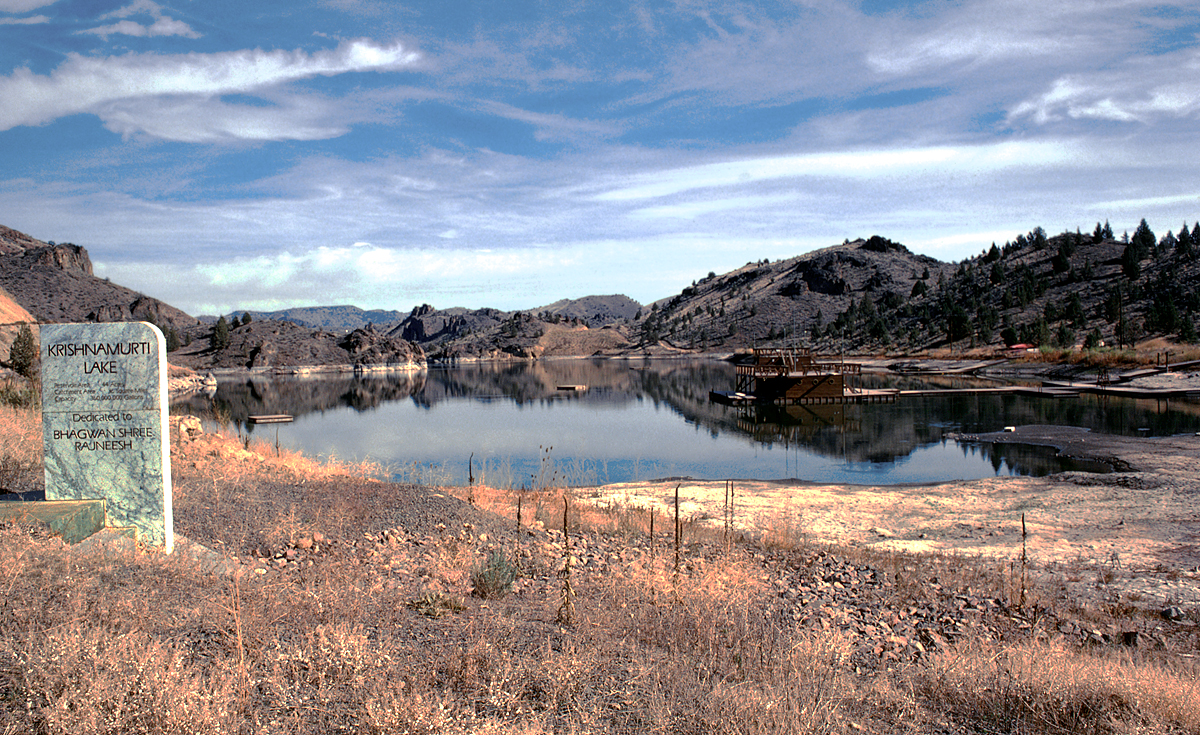
The Krishnamurti Lake

The town of Antelope, Oregon, became a focal point of the conflict. It was the nearest town to the ranch, and had a population of under 60. Initially, Rajneesh's followers had purchased only a small number of lots in Antelope. After the activist group 1000 Friends of Oregon became involved, Antelope denied the sannyasins a business permit for their mail-order operation, and more sannyasins moved into the town. In April 1982, Antelope held a vote to disincorporate itself, to prevent itself being taken over. By this time, there were enough Rajneeshee residents to defeat the measure. In May 1982, the residents of the Rancho Rajneesh commune voted to incorporate the separate city of Rajneeshpuram on the ranch. Apart from the control of Antelope and the land-use question, there were other disputes. The commune leadership took an aggressive stance on many issues and initiated litigation against various groups and individuals.

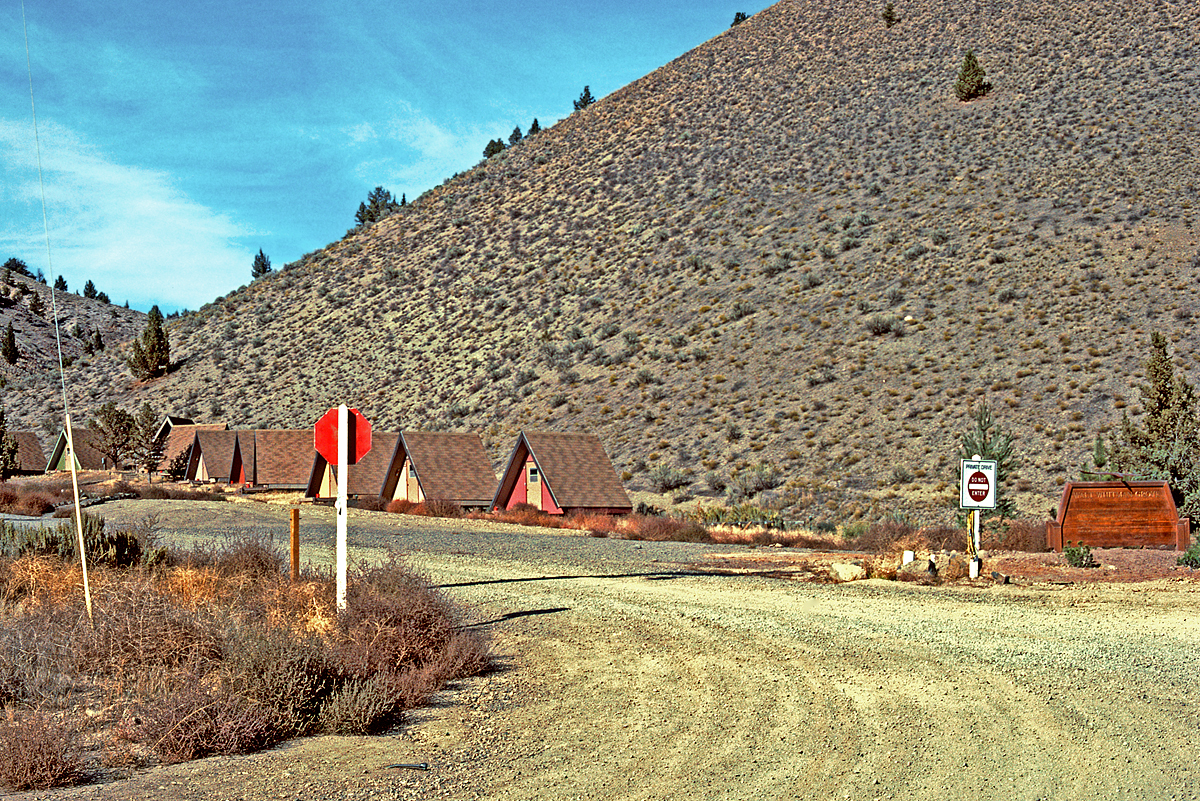
Guest houses built by Rajneesh followers.

The June 1983 bombing of Hotel Rajneesh, a Rajneeshee-owned hotel in Portland, by the Islamist militant group Jamaat ul-Fuqra further heightened tensions. The display of semi-automatic weapons acquired by the Rajneeshpuram Peace Force created an image of imminent violence. The Peace Force was heavily armed with Uzi Model B carbines, Galil rifles, Ruger Mini-14 carbines, M1A rifles, CAR-15 carbines, Ruger Model 44 carbines, and Smith & Wesson .357 revolvers. Rumors arose of the National Guard being called in to arrest Rajneesh. At the same time, the commune was embroiled in a range of legal disputes. Oregon Attorney General David B. Frohnmayer maintained that the city was essentially an arm of a religious organization, and that its incorporation thus violated the principle of separation of church and state. 1000 Friends of Oregon, who had seen success in prior land-use suits, fought against Rajneeshpuram's incorporation and claimed that the city violated state land-use laws. In 1983, a lawsuit was filed by the State of Oregon to invalidate the city's incorporation, and many attempts to expand the city further were legally blocked, prompting followers to attempt to build in nearby Antelope, which was briefly named Rajneesh, when sufficient numbers of Rajneeshees registered to vote there and won a referendum on the subject.

Tensions also arose between the commune at Rajneeshpuram and state officials, including the governor's office. The office of Oregon Governor Victor Atiyeh was first made aware of the group in the fall of 1981, and was receiving weekly or even daily updates about the group by 1984-85. Governor Atiyeh assigned his chief of staff, Gerry Thompson, and his legal assistant, Bob Oliver, to be the primary coordinators and representatives on the issue of Rajneeshpuram. The governor's office sought to stay impartial from the outside perspective, and not directly involve the governor, while keeping a close eye on and attempting to mediate the rising tensions between those in Rajneeshpuram and their neighbors in Antelope. In 1982, after dealing with leaks to the media about the Rajneeshee crisis, the concern of the governor's office being bugged was raised. The governor's offices and other government buildings were swept and ultimately came up with nothing, however, members of the Governor's office still took precautions and began to speak in code when using unprotected telephone lines to try to prevent leaks. The governor's office was also concerned with the lack of separation between church and state in Rajneeshpuram. Atiyeh, Thompson, and Attorney General Dave Frohnmayer believed the incorporation of Rajneeshpuram to be invalid due for this reason. Additionally, after the Rajneeshees took control of the Antelope public school district in 1983, Oregon Superintendent of Public Instruction, Verne Duncan ruled that the school lacked separation of church and state, banning religious articles such as images of the Bhagwan in the public school. By 1984, Thompson became increasingly involved in coordinating and communicating with federal and state organizations including the INS, DEA, IRS, FBI, Oregon National Guard, and Oregon State Police who were investigating the Rajneeshees and allegations of illegal activity.

Another event that led to tension between Oregonians and the Rajneeshees was their treatment of the homeless during their Share-A-Home program. Through this program, which began in September 1984, the leaders of Rajneeshpuram began bussing upwards of 4,000 homeless people into the commune. One of the main incentives for the migration of homeless people to Rajneeshpuram was to influence the upcoming elections. As Rajneeshpuram struggled to deal with the large number of sometimes disorderly new residents, they resorted to kicking anyone they found issue with from the commune. Additionally, leaders of the group including Ma Anand Puja (a nurse and head of the Rajneesh Medical Corporation) and Ma Anand Sheela were found to have drugged the drinks of unruly Share-A-Home participants in order to maintain control over them. Through their efforts to influence the election, over 3,000 new voter registration forms were filled out by those in Rajneeshpuram. This led to broader concerns by Oregonians and calls for the government to step in to prevent election tampering and voter fraud. This happened directly after October 10th, when Oregon Secretary of State Norma Paulus suspended all new voter registration for Wasco County, leaving new voter registration to be decided at hearings. This ultimately proved successful in preventing Rajneesh influence as only 15 Rajneeshpuram residents appealed, and no Rajneesh candidates won county seats. According to leaders like Ma Anand Sheela, they claimed Bhagwan had ordered their guests to be spread throughout Oregon as a type of punishment for challenging the Rajneesh. Leaders of Rajneeshpuram were also criticized for their treatment of homeless Share-a-Home participants after the suspension of voter registration. Hundreds of homeless were bussed into cities including The Dalles, Portland, and Salem. Organizations such as the Salvation Army and Oregon National Guard stepped in to provide aid to these individuals.

The Rajneeshpuram residents believed that the wider Oregonian community was both bigoted and suffered from religious intolerance. According to Carl Latkin, Rajneesh's followers had made peaceful overtures to the local community when they first arrived in Oregon. As Rajneeshpuram grew in size, heightened tensions led certain fundamentalist Christian church leaders to denounce Rajneesh, the commune, and his followers. Petitions were circulated aimed at ridding the state of the perceived menace. Letters to state newspapers reviled the Rajneeshees, one of them likening Rajneeshpuram to another Sodom and Gomorrah, another referring to them as a "cancer in our midst." In time, circulars mixing "hunting humor" with dehumanizing characterizations of Rajneeshees began to appear at gun clubs, turkey shoots and other gatherings; one of these, circulated widely over the Northwest, declared "an open season on the central eastern Rajneesh, known locally as the Red Rats or Red Vermin."

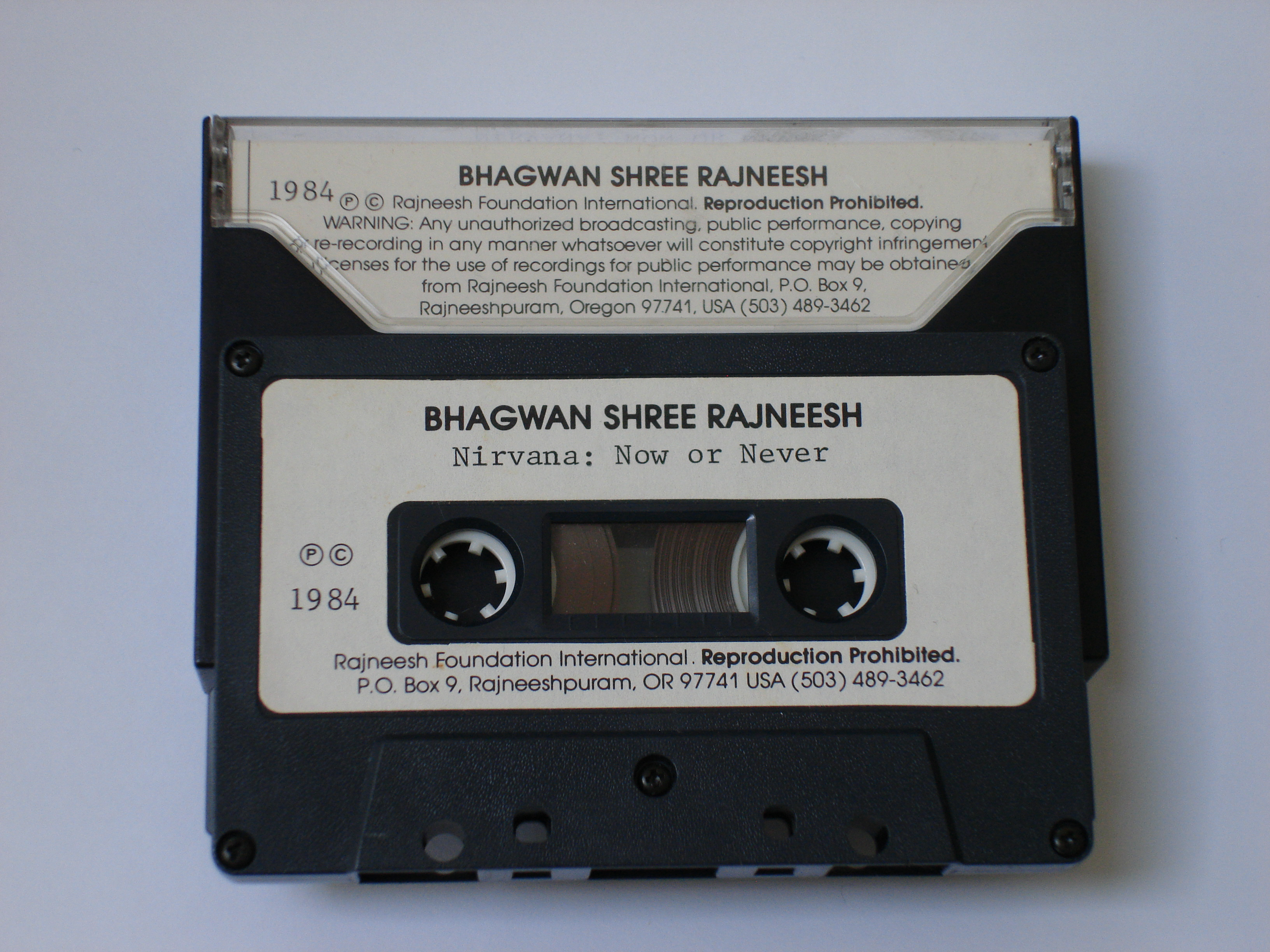
A cassette tape produced and sold in Rajneeshpuram

As Rajneesh himself did not speak in public during this period, and until October 1984 gave few interviews, his secretary and chief spokesperson Ma Anand Sheela (Sheela Silverman) became, for practical purposes, the leader of the commune. She did little to defuse the conflict, employing a crude, caustic, and defensive speaking style that exacerbated hostilities and attracted media attention. On September 14, 1985, Sheela and 15 to 20 other top officials abruptly left Rajneeshpuram. The following week, Rajneesh convened press conferences and publicly accused Sheela and her team of having committed crimes within and outside the commune. The subsequent criminal investigation, the largest in Oregon history, confirmed that a secretive group had, unbeknownst to both government officials and nearly all Rajneeshpuram residents, engaged in a variety of criminal activities, including the attempted murder of Rajneesh's physician, wiretapping and bugging within the commune and within Rajneesh's home, poisonings of two public officials, and arson.

== Rajneesh World Celebrations ==
In July 1982, the Rajneeshees hosted a "World Celebration" within their three ashrams (located in Oregon, India, and Germany). This 5-day celebration had meditation, satsangs, communal meals, and classes of spiritual practice. It was a way to welcome thousands of people into Wasco County. Many of the visitors to Rajneeshpuram were Rajneeshees drawn from other Rajneesh communes. The event was a major tourist attraction and an avenue of income for Rajneeshpuram. Although there was a legal permit for the event, many local residents opposed the celebration. There was fear of an increase in Rajneesh population, cultural influence, security, water, and sewage.

The second annual "World Celebration" was held over a 6-day period at Rajneeshpuram in 1983. This festival of "love, life, and laughter" was a celebration of the presence of Bhagwan and an opportunity for people to experience satsangs from him personally. The admission fee for the festival was around $500 per person. This included three daily meals from their cafeteria, access to boutiques, bookstores, a beer garden, dance floors, a mall, restaurants, pharmacies, and meditation and group therapy provided by the Rajneesh Meditation University.

The event occurred from July 2nd to July 8th, and the scheduled activities ran from 8:30am until 11:00pm. July 6th was specifically named "Masters Day," as it was anticipated to be the day with the highest number of visitors. Before the event took place, there was already lots of public attention regarding the festival. A Rajneesh news article had published that Governor Atiyeh eagerly accepted a personal invitation from Sheela to visit the annual celebration at Rajneeshpuram. Later it was reported from the Governor that he never visited the ranch or negotiated with Sheela.

In preparation for the festival, the Rajneeshees spent significant money and time on food, materials, and labor. The months preceding they used about twelve hundred gallons of paint and assigned groups to paint their hall and install linoleum flooring. They built a dam on a sloping grass hill, which created a 360 million gallon lake at the commune entrance. The area featured a large Rajneesh logo made of flowers and shrubs. The dam was also accompanied by sandy beaches, canoes, a wooden dock, and a floating pagoda. The Rajneeshees had multiple cafeterias set up that fed around six thousand people hourly. Festival visitors were also accommodated with sleeping supplies and tents that were large enough to fit four people. Some guests paid extra for "mountain cabins," which were small A shaped houses. Ma Anand Sheela was persistent in lavishing and cheering on festival attendees throughout, in hopes they would share their experiences when they returned back home and gain positive public attraction for the Rajneeshees.

== Role in 1984 bioterror attack ==
In 1984, Ma Anand Sheela and several Rajneeshpuram citizens planned, organized, and executed a bioterrorism attack, poisoning the salad bars of ten restaurants in Wasco County with Salmonella bacteria. The attack's purpose was to decrease voter turnout by sickening, terrorizing, and incapacitating voters so the Rajneeshpuram candidates would win the 1984 Wasco County elections. Although no one was killed, 751 people were sickened and 45 people were hospitalized, including several Wasco County public officials. The Rajneesh bioterrorism attack is the largest biological warfare attack in United States history.

Planning for the attack began in the summer of 1984, when Ma Anand Puja and her assistant began cultivating large quantities of salmonella bacteria in their makeshift private laboratory located in a shed in the commune called the "Chinese Laundry." In August they began with small scale tests at a restaurant and the Wasco County courthouse but did not see the results they had hoped for. In September they ramped up tests in preparation for the elections in November. They targeted at least 10 different restaurants, mostly targeting the salad bars, and poisoned over 700 individuals. Initially, contaminated water systems or food handlers were suspected of being the cause of the outbreak, but this couldn't be verified. Investigators found it difficult to pinpoint a specific or common cause of the cases being reported. Though some suspected the Rajneeshees, their suspicions weren't confirmed until later when a vial of the cultivated bacteria was found on the commune.

Ironically, the attack backfired by increasing voter turnout. Hundreds of local residents, suspecting Rajneeshee involvement in the attack, went to the polls on election day and voted overwhelmingly against the Rajneeshee candidates.

== Allegations of neglect and sexual abuse of children ==
A former member described as a child protective social worker said that there was "a tremendous amount of child neglect" at Rajneeshpuram, stating that children were expected to live away from their parents and were given minimal attention. She also claimed that sexual relationships among early teenagers (aged 12–14) were common. These statements have been corroborated by some sources and challenged by others. Other former residents also described cases of neglect. They reported that very young children were sometimes left outdoors in winter without adequate clothing and that toddlers occasionally wandered near heavy machinery and vehicles without supervision.

In order to focus on spiritual growth, Bhagwan had envisioned a generation of sannyasins without children. He referenced children as "obstacles to spiritual growth and devotion". Children who grew up in Rajneeshpuram were living in the "New Commune" and they would be raised by those living in the commune and not just their parents. The ashram had their own medical center which offered Rajneeshees vasectomies and tubal ligation at no cost. Girls as young as thirteen were reported to have procedures done.

Rajneesh supported sexual freedom and non-monogamy, and former members reported widespread sexual abuse of children in the community. Part of the teachings of sexual freedom is that Bhagwan designates the ages of 7 and 14 as prime periods of sexual experimenting and understanding. These early stages of adolescence are believed to be the right time to learn about the attachment of sex and love. Other former members attributed the prevalence of child abuse to the commune's culture of surrender, in which members were taught not to question what happened around them and could come to accept harmful conduct as spiritually justified. The relationships between adults and minors were described as an "open secret". When the public started discovering these allegations about the commune, leaders were more concerned about the Rajneeshpurams public image than the children's well-being.

A survivor described sexual acts that started when she was ten years old. She alleged that many teenagers on the ranch were pressured into sexual relationships with adults, which she characterized as statutory rape and child sexual abuse that was tolerated or concealed within the community. One girl who had lived at Rajneeshpuram between the ages of eleven and thirteen later said that some girls were involved in sexual relationships with adult men and that she knew of cases involving girls as young as ten. Participants in the commune's "Share-A-Home" program also described incidents they said they had witnessed. According to these accounts, children sometimes engaged in sexual behaviour with each other without supervision, and in one reported case a thirteen-year-old girl was involved with a much older man. Another witness claimed to have seen a man molesting a ten-year-old girl on a bus at the ranch.

A May 1985 issue article in Oregon Magazine reporting allegations of neglect and sexual abuse of children at Rancho Rajneesh prompted Diane McDonald of Madras to petition the Wasco County Circuit Court to investigate the welfare of children at the commune. The petition was later dismissed after investigators were unable to proceed because Rajneesh officials declined to cooperate.

Some officials and observers disputed these allegations. A 1982 inspection by an Oregon Children's Services Division manager reported finding no evidence of abuse or neglect during his visit, and psychologists who studied children living at the commune described generally positive impressions of their emotional and intellectual development. They did not attempt to collect information on whether children at the commune were involved in sexual activity.

== Air Rajneesh and Big Muddy Ranch Airport ==
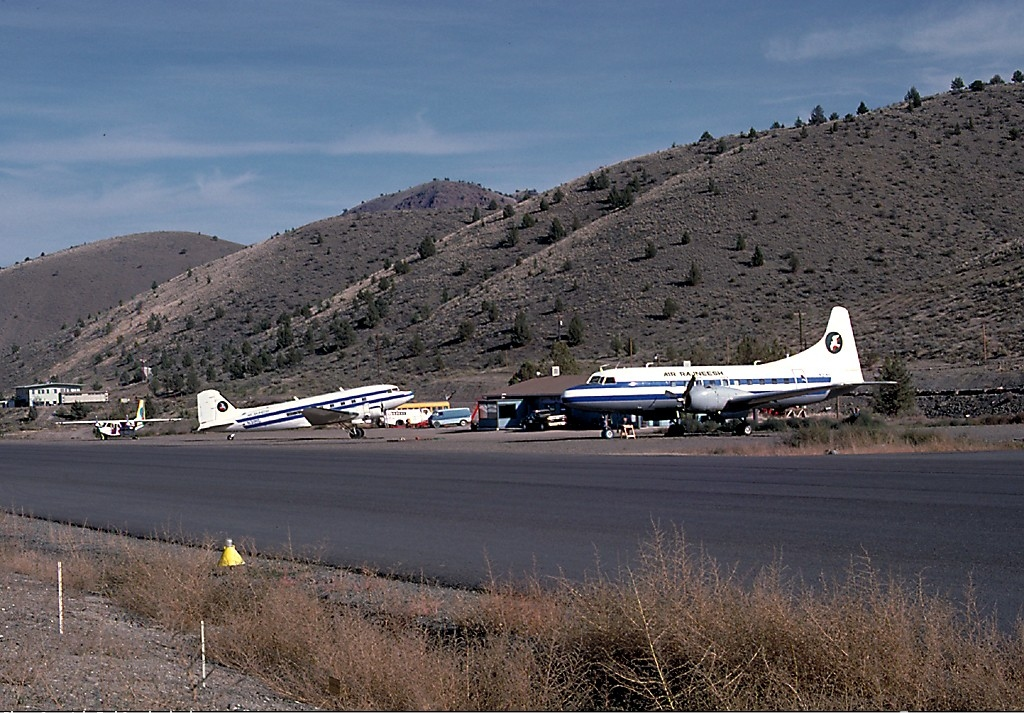
Air Rajneesh Convair 240 and Douglas DC-3 at Big Muddy Ranch Airport in October 1985.

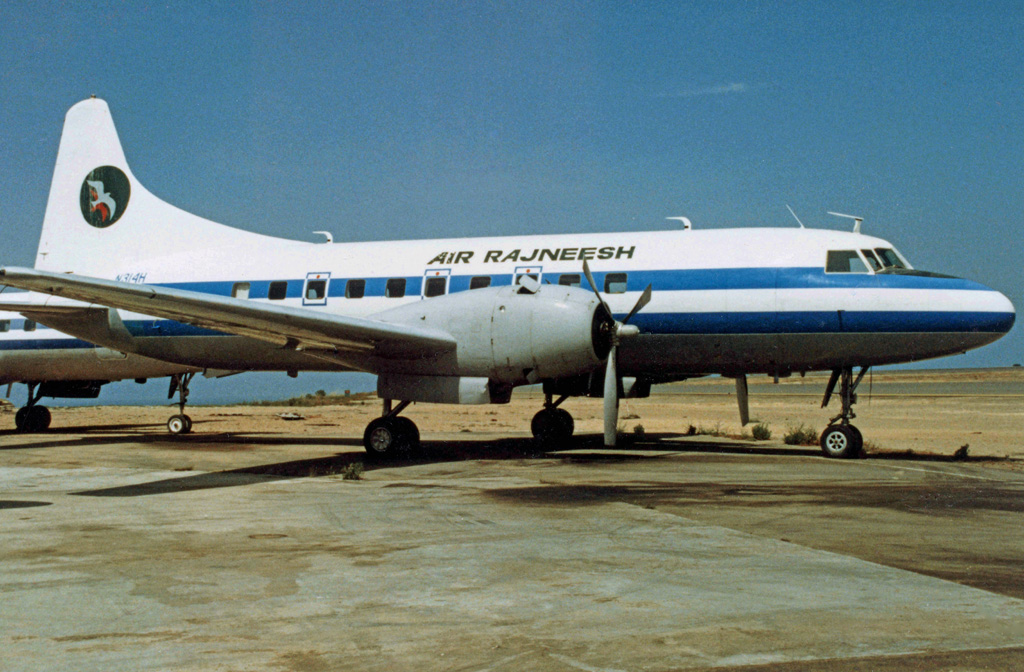
Convair 240 of Air Rajneesh, used to transport passengers and cargo to the enclave

In the mid-1980s members of the Rajneeshee commune constructed Big Muddy Ranch Airport to ferry supplies and passengers to Rajneeshpuram. To ferry the actual cargo and passengers the Rajneeshees created an airline called Air Rajneesh which operated large commuter aircraft out of Big Muddy Ranch Airport. This airport was used by Rajneesh in 1985 during his attempt to flee Oregon and evade law enforcement.

== Outcome ==
Sheela was extradited from West Germany, tried, convicted, and sentenced to prison for attempted murder, assault, wiretapping, arson, immigration fraud, and her role in the bioterror attack. During the next few years, the movement was investigated for several other felonies:

- Arson: On January 14, 1985, the Wasco County Planning Department office was set on fire. The fire extensively damaged the office and destroyed one-third to one-half of the county's files. Arson investigators suspected the Planning Department was targeted in an attempt to intimidate Wasco County employees, and to destroy the records of disputes involving the Rajneeshees.
- Attempted Murder: Commune members planned the assassinations of United States Attorney Charles H. Turner, Oregon Attorney General David Frohnmayer, and compiled a "hit list" of persons considered to be Rajneeshee enemies.
- Immigration Fraud: Rajneesh claimed he had travelled to the United States for medical reasons, but never sought medical treatment during his residence. Rajneesh subsequently pleaded guilty to immigration fraud.
- Voter Fraud: The Rajneeshpuram community attempted to sway local elections in their favor with their "Share-a-Home" program. The Rajneeshees bused thousands of homeless people to Rajneeshpuram, and registered them to vote to inflate the constituency of voters for the group's candidates. The Wasco county clerk countered the attempt by enforcing a regulation requiring all new voters to submit their qualifications when registering to vote. A federal judge upheld the clerk's decision.
- Currency and Drug Smuggling

The Office of the Attorney General alleged the criminal activity began in the spring of 1984, three years after the establishment of the commune.

Rajneesh himself was accused of immigration violations, to which he entered an Alford plea. As part of his plea bargain, Rajneesh agreed to leave the United States, returned to Pune, India, and the commune disbanded after his followers left Oregon.

Rajneeshpuram's legal status remained ambiguous. In the church/state suit, Federal Judge Helen J. Frye ruled against Rajneeshpuram in late 1985. Judge Frye's decision was issued too late to be of practical significance, and was not contested. However, the Oregon courts subsequently ruled in favor of the city; the Court of Appeals ruled in 1986 the incorporation had not violated the state planning system's agricultural land goals. The Oregon Supreme Court closed its litigation in 1987, leaving Rajneeshpuram vacant, bankrupt, but legal within Oregon law.

In 1985, the ranch was listed for sale at over $28M, but was ultimately sold in 1988 at a sheriff's auction for $4.5M to Connecticut General Life Insurance Company, the sole bidder.

== Washington Family Ranch ==
Dennis R. Washington's firm Washington Construction purchased The Big Muddy Ranch for $3.6 million in 1991. Washington attempted to run the ranch for profit, and also unsuccessfully negotiated with the state to turn it into a state park.

In 1996, Washington donated the ranch to Young Life, a Christian youth organization. Since 1999, Young Life has operated a summer camp there, first as the WildHorse Canyon Camp, later as the Washington Family Ranch.

There are two camps on the property today. The primary camp, Washington Family Ranch: Canyon serves high school students, while the smaller camp, Washington Family Ranch: Creekside, primarily serves middle school students.

The Big Muddy Ranch Airport is also located there.

== See also ==
- Ecclesia Athletic Association, another contemporaneous Oregon organization which drew comparisons to Rajneeshpuram
- Wild Wild Country, a 2018 documentary on the Rajneesh disputes.
