= Ma Anand Sheela =

Former Rajneeshee spokeswoman (born 1949)

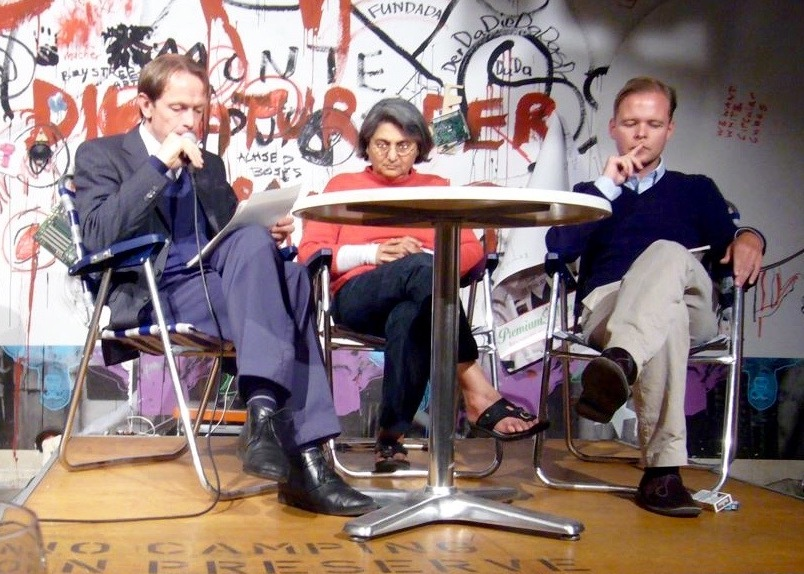
- David Woodard, Ma Anand Sheela (center), and Christian Kracht in 2008
- Born: Sheela Ambalal Patel; 28 December 1949 (age 76); Baroda, Bombay State, India
- Other names: Sheela Silverman, Sheela Birnstiel
- Known for: 1984 Rajneeshee bioterror attack
- Title: Personal secretary to Bhagwan Shree Rajneesh
- Term: 1981–1985
- Movement: Rajneesh (Osho)
- Status: Sentence served
- Criminal charges: Attempted murder Second-degree assault Illegal wire-tapping Arson; Immigration fraud
- Penalty: 4 and a half years prison

Ma Anand Sheela (born 28 December 1949 as Sheela Ambalal Patel, also known as Sheela Birnstiel and Sheela Silverman) is a former spokesperson of the Rajneesh movement. In 1986, she was convicted for attempted murder and assault for her role in the 1984 Rajneeshee bioterror attack.

As the secretary of Osho Rajneesh from 1981 through 1985, she managed the Rajneeshpuram ashram in Wasco County, Oregon, United States. In 1986, she pleaded guilty to attempted murder and assault for her role in the 1984 Rajneeshee bioterror attack. She received a four-and-a-half-year sentence in July 1986 in federal prison. She was released for good behaviour and deported to West Germany after 29 months. Sheela later moved to Switzerland, where she married, and purchased two nursing homes. In 1999, she was convicted by a Swiss court of "criminal acts preparatory to the commission of murder" in relation to a plot to kill US federal prosecutor Charles Turner in 1985, and she was sentenced to time served.

== Early life and education ==
Sheela was born Sheela Ambalal Patel in 1949 at Baroda, in Gujarat State, India, the youngest of six children of the Gujarati couple Ambalal and Maniben Patel. At age 18, she moved to the United States and attended Montclair State College in New Jersey.

== Career ==
=== Rajneesh movement ===
In 1981, Rajneesh appointed her as his personal assistant. In the same year, she convinced Rajneesh to leave India and establish an ashram in the United States. In July 1981, Rajneesh Foundation International purchased the 64,000-acre (260 km^{2}) Big Muddy Ranch in Wasco County, Oregon, which became the site for the development of the Rajneeshpuram commune. She was appointed the president of Rajneesh Foundation International, managed the commune and met daily with Rajneesh to discuss business matters. According to Sheela, Rajneesh was complicit in and directed her involvement in criminal acts she and a group of Rajneeshees committed later.

=== Rajneeshee bioterror attack ===
By 1984, the ashram was coming into increasing conflict with local residents and the Wasco County Board of Commissioners. Sheela attempted to have both Rajneeshee candidates for the two open seats on the Wasco County Board of Commissioners win the November election. She had hundreds of homeless people bused into the ashram, and she had them registered as voters in Wasco County. Later, when the local election board rejected the voter registrations, Sheela conspired to use "bacteria and other methods to make people ill" and prevent them from voting. She had salmonella put into salad bars at ten restaurants in The Dalles, Oregon; about 750 people became ill with salmonella poisoning.

On September 13, 1985, Sheela fled to Europe. A few days later Rajneesh "accused her of arson, wiretapping, attempted murder, and mass poisonings." He also asserted that Sheela had written the book titled Rajneeshism and published it under his name. Subsequently, Sheela's robes and 5,000 copies of the Book of Rajneeshism were burned in a bonfire at the ashram. The book, published in 1983, included edited excerpts from Rajneesh's lectures. It lists no other author on its title page; its editor is given as "Academy of Rajneeshism."

After US authorities searching her home found wire-tapping networks and a laboratory in which the bacteria used in the attack had been grown, Sheela was arrested in West Germany in October 1985. She was extradited to the US in February on charges of immigration fraud and attempted murder. The Oregon Attorney General prosecuted her for crimes related to the poisoning of Commissioner Matthew and Judge Hulse while the US Attorney prosecuted crimes related to the restaurant poisonings. Sheela pleaded guilty on 22 July 1986 to first-degree assault and conspiracy to commit assault against Hulse and later to second-degree assault and conspiracy to commit assault against Commissioner Matthew. She pleaded guilty to setting fire to a county office and wire-tapping at the commune. For these crimes, Sheela was sentenced to three 20-year terms in federal prison, ultimately reduced to 4 1/2 years, to be served concurrently. In addition she was fined $470,000.

Sheela was sent to the Federal Correctional Institution in Dublin, California, for female criminals. While there, she announced plans to make a "controversial documentary" about her life. In December 1988, she was released on good behavior after serving 29 months and deported to West Germany. Sheela later moved to Switzerland.

== Later life ==
Sheela married Swiss citizen Urs Birnstiel, a fellow Rajneesh follower. She moved to Maisprach, Switzerland, where she bought and managed two nursing homes.

In 1999, she was convicted by a Swiss court for "criminal acts preparatory to the commission of murder", in relation to a plot to kill US federal prosecutor Charles Turner in 1985. The Swiss government refused to extradite her to the US, but it agreed to try her in Switzerland. She was found guilty of the equivalent Swiss charge, and she was sentenced to time served.

== Personal life ==
Sheela married Marc Harris Silverman, an American from Highland Park, Illinois, and took the name Sheela P. Silverman. She returned to India in 1972 to pursue spiritual studies with her husband. They became disciples of the Indian guru Rajneesh and Sheela took the name Ma Anand Sheela. After her husband died, Sheela married a fellow Rajneesh follower, John Shelfer. After prison, Sheela married Urs Birnstiel, a Swiss citizen, who died of AIDS shortly after their marriage.

== Media and documentaries ==
The 2018 documentary Wild Wild Country includes several interviews with Sheela. On July 20, 2018, 'BBC Stories' YouTube channel published a video called Wild Wild Country: What happened to Sheela? Priyanka Chopra starred as Sheela in Amazon Studios Sheela, a feature film adaptation of Wild Wild Country. Sheela did not want the actress to play her and sent the actress a notice, demanding that she abort the project. She instead wanted Indian actress Alia Bhatt to play her onscreen.

In April 2021, a documentary film titled Searching for Sheela was released on Netflix. The film, produced by Karan Johar, documented her first trip to India after 35 years.

== Bibliography ==
- Carter, Lewis F. (1990). Charisma and Control in Rajneeshpuram. The Arnold and Caroline Rose Monograpghs Series of the American Sociological Association. Cambridge: Cambridge University Press. ISBN 0-521-38554-7.
- Carus, W. Seth (2002). Bioterrorism and Biocrimes: The Illicit Use of Biological Agents Since 1900. Fredonia Books. ISBN 1-4101-0023-5.
- Collins, Catherine Ann (1992), "Chapter Nine: Ma Anand Sheela: Media Power through Radical Discourse", in King, Andrew (ed.), Postmodern Political Communication: The Fringe Challenges the Center, Praeger Publishers, pp. 115–131, ISBN 0-275-93840-9
- Goldwag, Arthur (2009). Cults, Conspiracies, and Secret Societies. Vintage. ISBN 978-0-307-39067-7.
- Kahn, Laura (2009). Who's in Charge?: Leadership during Epidemics, Bioterror Attacks, and Other Public Health Crises. Praeger. ISBN 978-0-275-99485-3.
- Kushner, Harvey W. (2002). Encyclopedia of Terrorism. SAGE Publications. ISBN 978-0-7619-2408-1.
- Laqueur, Walter (2000). The New Terrorism: Fanaticism and the Arms of Mass Destruction. Oxford University Press, USA. ISBN 0-19-514064-8.
- Lalich, Janja (2004). Bounded Choice: True Believers and Charismatic Cults. University of California Press. ISBN 0-520-24018-9.
- Lax, Alistair J. (2005). Toxin: The Cunning of Bacterial Poisons. Oxford University Press, USA. ISBN 0-19-860558-7.
- McCann, Joseph T. (2006). Terrorism on American Soil: A Concise History of Plots and Perpetrators from the Famous to the Forgotten. Sentient Publications. ISBN 1-59181-049-3.
- McIsaac, Joseph H. (2006). Hospital Preparation for Bioterror: A Medical and Biomedical Systems Approach. Academic Press. ISBN 0-12-088440-2.
- McPheters, Mike (2009). "The Rajneesh Experiment". Agent Bishop. Cedar Fort. pp. 142–156. ISBN 978-1-59955-317-7.
- Miller, Judith; Stephen Engelberg; William J. Broad (2002). Germs: Biological Weapons and America's Secret War. Simon & Schuster. ISBN 0-684-87159-9.
- Mullan, Von Bob (1983). Life as laughter: following Bhagwan Shree Rajneesh. Routledge. ISBN 978-0-7102-0043-3.
- Oregon Historical Society (2002). "Ma Anand Sheela (b. 1950)". The Oregon History Project. www.ohs.org. Archived from the original on September 24, 2015.
- Tucker, Jonathan B. (2000). Toxic Terror: Assessing Terrorist Use of Chemical and Biological Weapons. The MIT Press. ISBN 0-262-70071-9.
- Wellman, James K. (2007). Belief and Bloodshed: Religion and Violence across Time and Tradition. Rowman & Littlefield Publishers, Inc. ISBN 978-0-7425-5824-3.

=== Further reading ===
- Collins, Catherine Ann (1992), "Chapter Nine: Ma Anand Sheela: Media Power through Radical Discourse", in King, Andrew (ed.), Postmodern Political Communication: The Fringe Challenges the Center, Praeger Publishers, pp. 115–131, ISBN 0-275-93840-9
- The Oregonian staff (December 14, 1988). "Sheela: A Chronology". The Oregonian. Oregonian Publishing Co. p. E06.
- O'Brien, Paula (2008) The Rajneesh sannyasin community in Fremantle Archived March 27, 2016, at the Wayback Machine Master's degree thesis at Murdoch University
