= Sportsman's Park (disambiguation) =

Sportsman's Park was a series of baseball stadiums in St. Louis, Missouri, U.S.

Sportsman's Park may also refer to:

- Sportsman's Park, area surrounding State Farm Stadium in Glendale, Arizona, U.S.
- Sportsman's Park, horse racing track in Cicero, Illinois, U.S., which became Chicago Motor Speedway
- Sportsman's Park, sports stadium in New Orleans, Louisiana, U.S., which became Crescent City Base Ball Park

== See also ==
- Sportsmans Park, Oregon, U.S., unincorporated community in Wasco County
- Sportsman Park, ballpark located in Greenville, Mississippi, U.S.
