= Earle Chiles =

Earle Chiles may refer to:

- Earle A. Chiles (1904–1982), American businessman and philanthropist
- Earle M. Chiles (1933–2016), his son, American businessman and philanthropist
