= Earle M. Chiles =

American businessman and philanthropist (1933–2016)

- Born: February 4, 1933; Portland, Oregon, US
- Died: June 23, 2016 (aged 83); Portland, Oregon, US
- Education: Menlo College; Stanford University
- Occupation: Businessman
- Known for: Philanthropy
- Board member of: Fred Meyer
- Parent(s): Earle A. Chiles and Virginia (Hughes) Chiles
- Awards: Honorary doctorate degrees from Menlo College, University of Boston, and University of Portland; University of Oregon President's Medal; Simon Benson Award for Philanthropy from Portland State University; and the German government's Silver Cross of Honor and German-American Friendship Award

Earle Meyer Chiles (February 4, 1933 – June 23, 2016) was an American businessman and philanthropist from the US state of Oregon. He was born into a wealthy and influential business family. Chiles attended Menlo College and then graduate school at Stanford University. He worked in his family's retail business in Oregon, including serving on the board of directors of Fred Meyer, a large retail company founded by his grandfather. He was also chief executive officer of Earle Chiles and Affiliated Companies and president of the Chiles Foundation. Over the years, he contributed financially to numerous educational institutions and non-profit organizations.

== Early life ==
Chiles was born in Portland, Oregon on February 4, 1933, the son of Earle A. Chiles and Virginia (Hughes) Chiles. His family was one of the wealthiest and most influential families in Oregon. His father was the stepson of Fred G. Meyer, founder of the Fred Meyer chain of grocery and retail stores. The senior Chiles served as president of the Fred Meyer company from 1955 to 1968. He also founded the Chiles Foundation in 1949.

Chiles grew up in Portland. He attended Menlo College in Atherton, California, where he received his undergraduate degree in 1956. He went on to attend graduate school at Stanford University, receiving a master's degree in business administration from in 1958.

== Businessman ==
Chiles spent most of his adult life working in family businesses related to the Fred Meyer retail chain and the Chiles Foundation. He served on the board of directors of the Fred Meyer company, a multibillion-dollar company founded by his grandfather. Chiles was also the chief executive officer of Chiles and Affiliated Companies a real estate investment and property management firm based in Portland composed of several loosely associated partnerships that purchased land and then leased the property to Fred Meyer for its store sites. The company owned property throughout Oregon and in other Pacific Northwest states.

After the Fred Meyer retail chain was acquired in a leveraged buyout in 1981, Chiles became a minority shareholder in the business. This included minority shares in several real estate partnerships. These partnerships owned properties that were leased to the Fred Meyer company. In 1986, a conflict arose between Chiles and Fred Meyer executives regarding the management of six partnerships that owned sites where 15 stores were located. Chiles filed a lawsuit against Fred Meyer management, alleging that company officers, who held the majority share of the partnership stock, prevented minority stockholders from participating in management decisions and then entered into lease agreements with the Fred Meyer company based on artificially low real estate valuations for partnership properties. Ultimately, the court found in favor of Chiles. The judgement was for $18.7 million (equivalent to $54,925,000 in 2025). Chiles and his mother were the principal beneficiaries of that judgement.

== Philanthropy ==
In addition to his business interests, Chiles was engaged in wide-ranging philanthropy throughout his life. Much of this work was done through the Chiles Foundation, established by his father in 1949. Chiles became executive director of the foundation in 1968 and continued in that position until 1983 when he became the foundation's president. He led the foundation until his death in 2016. During his tenure as president, the foundation contributed to numerous educational and cultural institutions and provided grants and scholarships to thousands of individuals. The foundation was also a major contributor to medical research institutions and healthcare projects.

Throughout his life, Chiles supported higher education, donating millions of dollars to colleges and universities around the country. These included significant contributions to Menlo College, University of Portland, Portland State University, University of Oregon, Lewis and Clark College, Boston University, Harvard University, and Stanford University. For example, the Chiles Foundation financed the Earle A. Chiles Business Center at the University of Oregon in 1985. Over the decades, Chiles also served on the board of trustees for a number of institutions, including Menlo College, University of Portland, Boston University, Harvard Business School, and Stanford Graduate School of Business. In addition, he served on the Oregon State University Foundation board of trustees, the Portland State University Foundation Board, and the oversight board for the Institute of International Education in San Francisco. He was also a senator of the board at LMU Munich in Germany.

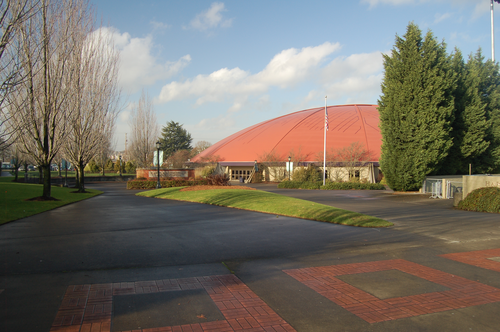
Chiles Center at the University of Portland

Chiles was a regular and generous contributor to the University of Portland, donating more than $10 million. He also served on the board of regents for over forty years beginning in 1975. In 1984, he used the Chiles Foundation to provide the lead gift for the construction of what became the Earle A. and Virginia H. Chiles Center, the university's athletic and cultural center. In 2011, the Chiles funded a $2 million renovation and expansion of the Chiles Center. Chiles also endowed scholarships, funded campus ministries, and helped finance facility projects, including donating a bell for the university's landmark bell tower.

Chiles used the Chiles Foundation to support medical research and healthcare programs as well. In 1981, he became a founding member of the Providence Portland Medical Foundation and remained a member of the foundation's board of directors until his death. Much of his financial support focused on scientific research and treatments for cancer patients. In 1987, he created the Earle A. Chiles Research Institute at the Providence Cancer Center, naming the facility after his father. The research center helped establish the institution's immunotherapy cancer research and treatment program. He also helped finance the surgery tower at Providence Medical Center in Portland, and later, the Providence Heart and Vascular Institute.

Chiles also supported cultural institutions in Oregon and around the country. He was a lifelong member of the Oregon Symphony Associations' board and a long-time member of the Boston Symphony Orchestra's oversight board. Chiles was also a life trustee of the High Desert Museum in Bend, Oregon.

His philanthropy earned numerous awards throughout his life. In 1987, the University of Portland granted him an honorary Doctor of Public Service degree. In 1994, the university inducted him into its athletic hall of fame, in recognition of his dedicated support of the school's athletic teams. He also received an honorary Doctorate of Humane Letters from Boston University and an honorary Doctorate of Humane Letters from Menlo College. He received the 1986 Pioneer Award and 1998 President's Medal from the University of Oregon as well as the Aubrey Watzek Award from Lewis and Clark College and the 2014 Simon Benson Award for Philanthropy from Portland State University. Chiles even received international recognition, including the Silver Cross of Honor presented by the German Armed Forces and the German government's German-American Friendship Award.

== Death and legacy ==
Chiles died in Portland on June 23, 2016, after a long illness. His funeral was held on July 1, at St. Mary's Cathedral of the Immaculate Conception in Portland. The funeral was open to the public. After the ceremony, a luncheon for friends and admirers of Chiles was held at the Earle A. and Virginia H. Chiles Center on the University of Portland campus.

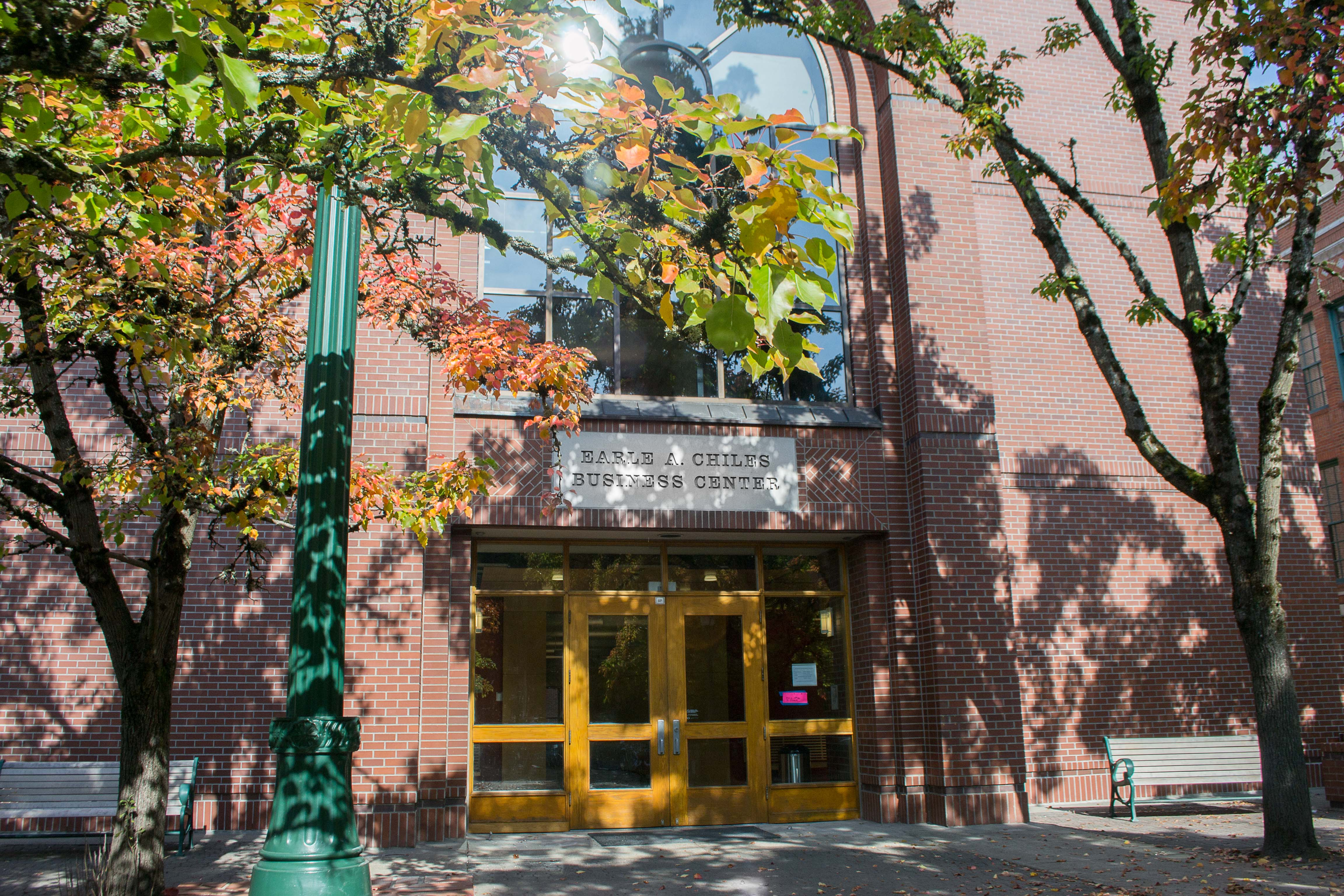
University of Oregon, Chiles Business Center

His net worth at the time of his death was never made public. However, his personal wealth, along with the assets of the Chiles Foundation, which he controlled, was likely quite substantial. After his death, his 5,681-square-foot (527.8 m^{2}) penthouse apartment in the KOIN Center in downtown Portland was put on the market for $3.3 million (equivalent to $4,215,000 in 2024). The apartment occupied three-quarters of the thirtieth floor of the building, with views looking out over the city in every direction. The proceeds from the sale went to the Chiles Foundation.

Chiles used the Chiles Foundations to make major donations that often honored his parents: as a result, numerous institutions, buildings, programs, and awards bear the name of his father, Earle A. Chiles, while there are virtually none that are named for Earle M. Chiles. The Earle A. Chiles Research Institute located at the Robert W. Franz Cancer Center, headquarters of Providence Cancer Institute, in Portland is internationally known as a leader in immunotherapy cancer research and treatment. The Earle A. Chiles Business Center at the University of Oregon was the first privately donor-initiated building on that campus. It houses classrooms, a computer lab, and the business research institute. He also financed the Virginia Hughes Chiles Atrium in Boston University's School of Management and the Earle A. Chiles Center on the Spirit of the West at the High Desert Museum in Bend, Oregon.
