= Rice, Oregon =

Unincorporated community in the state of Oregon, United States

- Unincorporated community
- Location within Oregon Location within the United States
- Coordinates: 45°30′19″N 121°02′39″W
- Country: United States
- State: Oregon
- County: Wasco
- Elevation: 1,010 ft (310 m)
- Time zone: UTC-8 (Pacific (PST))
  - Summer (DST): UTC-7 (PDT)
- Area codes: 458 and 541
- Coordinates and elevation from United States Geological Survey

Rice is an unincorporated community in Wasco County, in the U.S. state of Oregon. It is about 5 miles (8 km) northeast of Dufur, near Boyd and U.S. Route 197.

Rice was named for Horace Rice (1829–1915), an Oregon Trail pioneer who settled on upper Fifteenmile Creek in the 1860s and who planted the first crop of wheat in upland Wasco County. When the Great Southern Railroad established a line into the area in 1905, Rice's name was given to the station near the confluence of Fifteenmile Creek and Dry Creek. At one time Rice had a 50,000-bushel farmers' grain elevator run by the Rice-Union Elevator Company. According to the author of Oregon Geographic Names, however, as of 1980 "there was little evidence of urban activity."

The historic Rice Cemetery is the burial place for several members of the Rice family.
