= Nansene, Oregon =

Unincorporated community in the state of Oregon, United States

- Unincorporated community
- Location within Oregon Location within the United States
- Coordinates: 45°24′15″N 121°03′24″W
- Country: United States
- State: Oregon
- County: Wasco
- Elevation: 2,044 ft (623 m)
- Time zone: UTC-8 (Pacific (PST))
  - Summer (DST): UTC-7 (PDT)
- Area codes: 458 and 541
- GNIS feature ID: 1130071

Nansene is an unincorporated community in Wasco County, in the U.S. state of Oregon. It lies along Long Hollow Market Road southeast of the small city of Dufur. Between Nansene and Dufur, the road crosses Dry Creek, a tributary of Fifteenmile Creek.

The name Nansene probably derives from a Native American word describing Fifteenmile Creek. A post office operated in Nansene from 1880 through 1894.

In the late 19th century, children in the community attended Nansene School. A school report published in The Dalles Weekly Chronicle in 1898 mentions enrollment of 5 boys and 14 girls for a total of 19 students.
