= Endersby (surname) =

Endersby is a surname that may refer to:

- Devon Endersby (born 1992), South African-born English cricketer
- Jimmy Endersby (born 1998), American professional baseball pitcher
- Penny Endersby, British researcher
- Ralph Endersby Harwood (1883–1951), Financial Secretary to George V, Edward VIII and George VI
- Ralph Endersby (born 1950), Canadian actor and producer
- Scott Endersby (born 1962), English footballer
- Stan Endersby (born 1947), Canadian singer-songwriter and guitarist

== See also ==
- Endersby, Oregon, an unincorporated community

Media related to Endersby (surname) at Wikimedia Commons
