= Fairbanks, Oregon =

Coordinates: 45°37′26″N 121°00′07″W

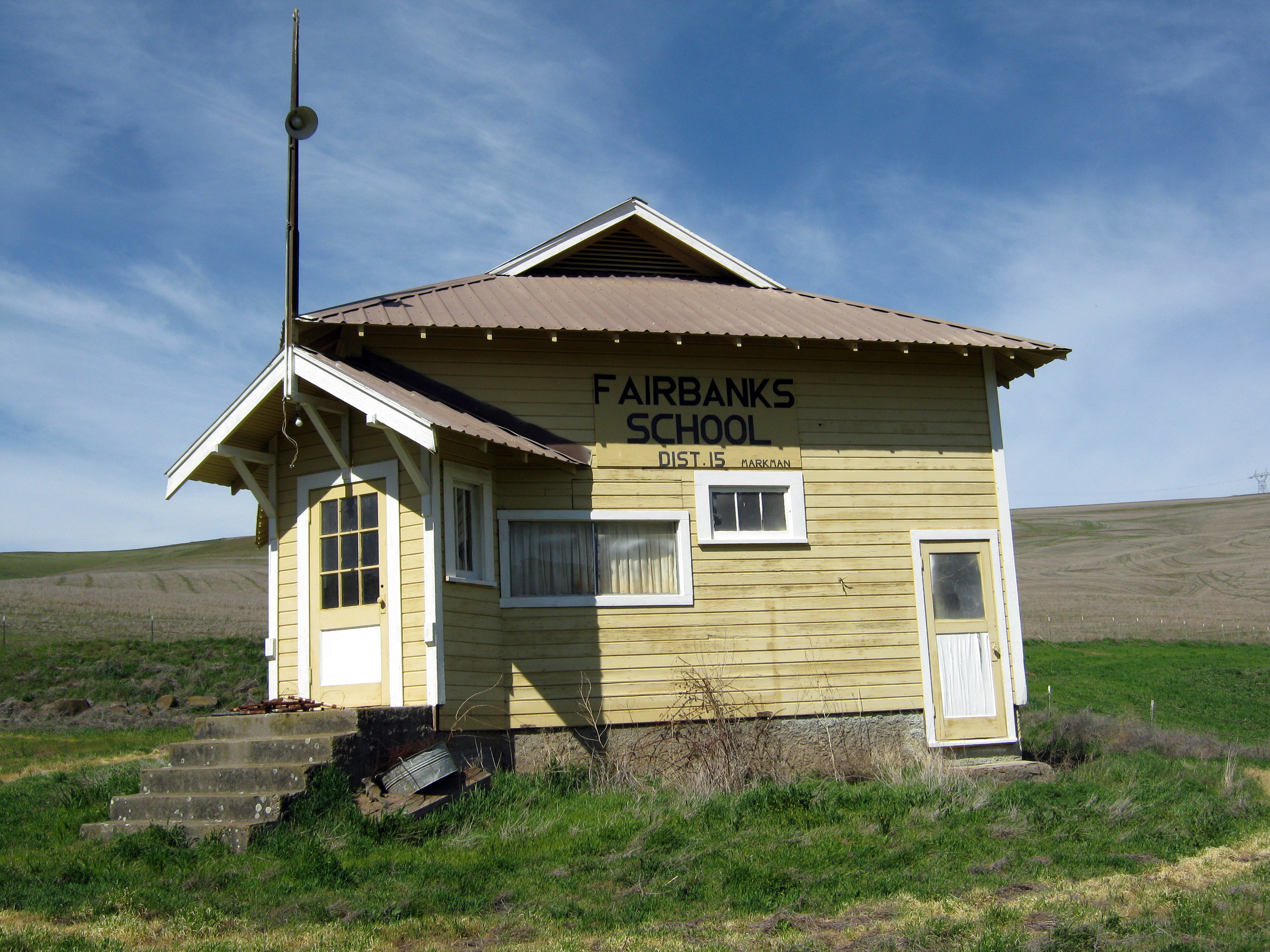
Old schoolhouse in Fairbanks

Fairbanks is an unincorporated community in Wasco County, Oregon, United States. It is about 12 miles (19 km) east of The Dalles, just south of U.S. Route 30/Interstate 84, near Fifteenmile Creek.

Fairbanks was established in 1905 as a station on the Great Southern Railroad. It was named for Charles W. Fairbanks, then newly elected vice president under Theodore Roosevelt. Fairbanks post office was established in 1905 and ran until 1909, when it closed out to Freebridge. Freebridge soon closed out to Wrentham. Both locales were also Great Southern stations.
