= Tommy Davis (outfielder) =

American baseball player (1939–2022)

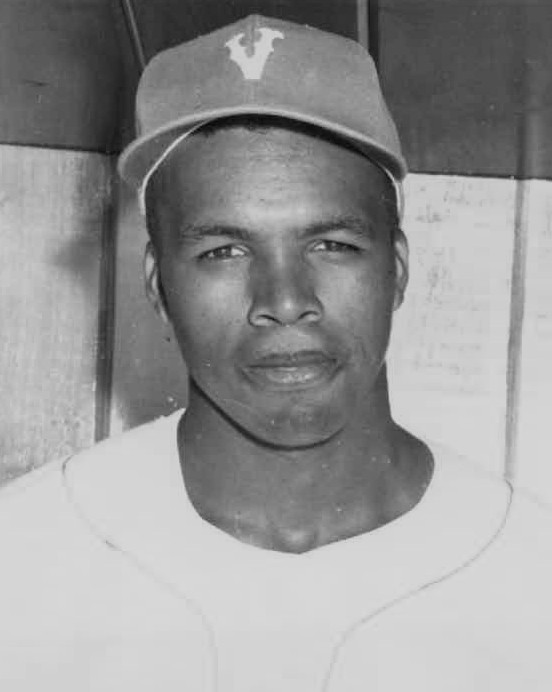
- Davis with the Victoria Rosebuds, c. 1958
- Left fielder / Designated hitter
- Born: March 21, 1939; Brooklyn, New York, U.S.
- Died: April 3, 2022 (aged 83); Phoenix, Arizona, U.S.
- Batted: Right Threw: Right

MLB debut
- September 22, 1959, for the Los Angeles Dodgers

Last MLB appearance
- October 2, 1976, for the Kansas City Royals

MLB statistics
- Batting average: .294
- Hits: 2,121
- Home runs: 153
- Runs batted in: 1,052
- Stats at Baseball Reference

Teams
- Los Angeles Dodgers (1959–1966); New York Mets (1967); Chicago White Sox (1968); Seattle Pilots (1969); Houston Astros (1969–1970); Oakland Athletics (1970); Chicago Cubs (1970); Oakland Athletics (1971); Chicago Cubs (1972); Baltimore Orioles (1972–1975); California Angels (1976); Kansas City Royals (1976)

Career highlights and awards
- 3× All-Star (1962–1963); World Series champion (1963); 2× NL batting champion (1962, 1963); NL RBI leader (1962)

Herman Thomas Davis Jr. (March 21, 1939 – April 3, 2022) was an American professional baseball left fielder, third baseman, designated hitter, and coach. He played in Major League Baseball (MLB) from 1959 to 1976 for ten different teams, most prominently for the Los Angeles Dodgers where he was a two-time National League batting champion and was a member of the 1963 World Series winning team.

During an 18-year baseball career, Davis batted .294 with 153 home runs, 2,121 hits and 1,052 runs batted in (RBI) in 1,999 career games. He was also a talented pinch hitter, batting .307 (62-for-202) in his career. In 1962, he finished third in the MVP voting after leading the major leagues in batting average, hits and runs batted in.

Davis's 153 RBIs in that season broke Roy Campanella's team record of 142 in 1953 and remains the franchise record; his 230 hits are the team record for a right-handed batter (second most in franchise history behind only Babe Herman's 241 in 1930), and his .346 average was the highest by a Dodgers right-handed hitter in the 20th century until it was broken by Mike Piazza in 1997 with .362.

== Early life ==
Herman Thomas Davis Jr. was born in Brooklyn, New York, and grew up in the neighborhood of Bedford–Stuyvesant. He was the only child of Herman Sr. and Grace Lenore Davis. His mother referred to him as "Tommy" to distinguish him from his father.

He attended Boys High School in Brooklyn, where he was a basketball teammate of future Hall of Famer Lenny Wilkens and played for coach Mickey Fisher. He was also a long jumper on the school's track and field team with record breaker Bernard Lowther. In 1956, he was considering signing with the New York Yankees, but received a phone call from Jackie Robinson who convinced him to sign with the Brooklyn Dodgers instead.

== Professional career ==
=== Minor league years ===
Signing out of high school, Davis began his minor league career for the Class-D Hornell Dodgers of the Pennsylvania–Ontario–New York League in 1956 before moving to the Kokomo Dodgers of the Midwest League the following season where he won a batting title. During his time in Kokomo, Davis credited manager Pete Reiser for helping him grow as player, recalling years later that Reiser encouraged him to be a more aggressive hitter and base runner.

In 1958, he was promoted to the Double-A Victoria Rosebuds of the Texas League where he performed well despite playing with an injured wrist. Davis recalled facing racial discrimination while in Victoria, remarking years later: "The more they yelled, the harder I played." Towards the end of the season, Davis was promoted again, this time to the Triple-A Montreal Royals of the International League where he won the year-end Governors' Cup with the team, defeating the Toronto Maple Leafs in five games.

Davis was moved to the Spokane Indians of the Pacific Coast League for the 1959 season, where he won another batting title. During the year, he was briefly called up to the Dodgers, making his major league debut as a pinch hitter on September 22, 1959 against the St. Louis Cardinals; he struck out against Marshall Bridges after pinch hitting for pitcher Clem Labine.

=== Major League years ===
==== Los Angeles Dodgers ====
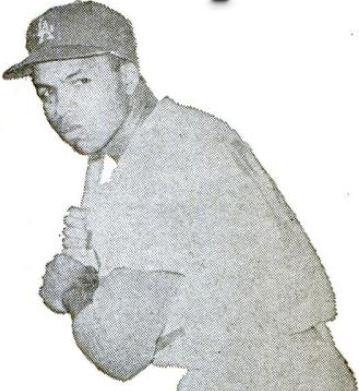
Davis in 1963

Davis made the Los Angeles Dodgers—who had moved from Brooklyn to the west coast prior to the 1958 season—during spring training 1960 and batted .276 in his 1960 rookie season, and .278 in 1961, before enjoying his breakout year in 1962 as the team moved into the new Dodger Stadium. His .346 batting average edged out Frank Robinson's .342 for the National League batting crown, and his 230 hits and 153 RBI led the major leagues. His 230 hits in 1962 were the most in a season by any player between 1937 and 1969, while his 153 RBI, a franchise record, was the highest total reached between 1949 and 1998. He also had career bests with 27 home runs, 120 runs, and nine triples as the Dodgers finished the regular schedule tied for first place with the San Francisco Giants, but lost a three-game playoff. He finished third in the MVP balloting, with teammate Maury Wills winning the award and Willie Mays finishing second.

In two separate games from 1961 and 1962, Davis beat future Hall of Famer Bob Gibson with a solo home run, both times helping teammate Sandy Koufax win the game by a score of 1–0. On May 25, 1961, at Sportsman Park, Gibson and Koufax matched six scoreless innings before Davis hit a home run in the seventh for the only run of the game. The following season, on June 18 at Dodger Stadium, after the two pitchers matched eight scoreless innings, Davis hit a walk-off home run off Gibson. Koufax, who was a Brooklyn native like Davis, would joke after one of the games, "Us Brooklyn boys got to stick together."

In 1963, Davis won his second batting title, edging Roberto Clemente by six points, and finished eighth in the MVP balloting. In the 1963 World Series, the Dodgers swept the New York Yankees; batting cleanup, Davis hit .400 in the Series, tripling twice in Game 2 and driving in the only run of the 1–0 Game 3 victory, his first-inning single off Jim Bouton driving in Jim Gilliam.

To date, Davis's back-to-back batting titles are the only two in the Dodgers' Los Angeles history. Only two right-handed hitters have won multiple National League batting titles since: Bill Madlock with four, and Roberto Clemente with four. Davis won the batting titles while playing his home games at Dodger Stadium, well known to be a pitcher-friendly ballpark.

Davis slumped to .275 in 1964 as the Dodgers finished out of contention for the pennant. On May 1, 1965, against the visiting Giants, he broke and dislocated his ankle sliding into second base while trying to break up a double play and was lost for the remainder of the season, although he did pinch-hit on the final day of the regular season. Three days later, the Dodgers called up Lou Johnson to replace him. The Dodgers won the World Series that year, defeating the Minnesota Twins in seven games. Davis rebounded in 1966, batting .313 in 100 games, but he hit just three home runs and recorded 27 RBI in 313 at bats. Los Angeles was swept by the Baltimore Orioles in the World Series, with Davis starting only two of the four games and batting .250.

==== Later career: 10 teams in 10 years ====
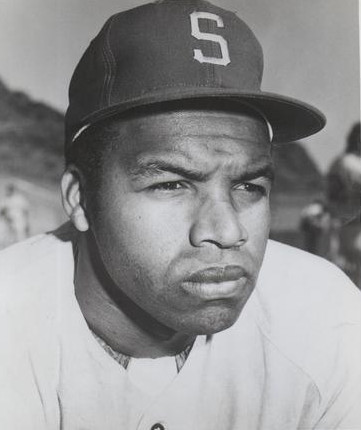
Davis with the Seattle Pilots in 1969

On November 29, 1966, Davis was traded to the New York Mets along with Derrell Griffith in exchange for Ron Hunt and Jim Hickman. He batted .302 with 16 home runs and 73 RBI in 154 games during the 1967 season. On December 15, 1967, Davis was traded again, this time to the Chicago White Sox in a six-player deal, with the Mets acquiring Tommie Agee and Al Weis—two men who would play major roles in the Miracle Mets winning the 1969 World Series.

In 1968, in what would become the "Year of the Pitcher", Davis led the White Sox in hitting with a .268 average, and posted eight home runs and 50 RBI in 132 games. Teammate Tommy John felt the trade was a mistake because the White Sox at that time were based more on defense and speed, neither of which was Davis's strong point. In October 1968, Davis was selected by the Seattle Pilots in the expansion draft. The following season, he batted .271 with six home runs and 80 RBI in 123 games with the Pilots before being traded to the Houston Astros, where he hit .241 with a home run and 9 RBI; his 20 stolen bases that year were a career high.

During the 1969 season, pitcher Jim Bouton was Davis's teammate in both Seattle and Houston. Subsequently, he was featured heavily in Bouton's book Ball Four which was published the following year. Bouton wrote favorably about his teammate and, as a result, Davis was one of the few players who did not shun Bouton; the two remained friends until Bouton's death in 2019.

Davis began 1970 with Houston, hitting .282 with three home runs and 30 RBI in 57 games before his contract was sold to the Oakland Athletics in June; he hit .290 with a home run and 27 RBI in 66 games with the A's before being sent to the Chicago Cubs for the last two weeks of the season. The Cubs released him in December, and he re-signed with the A's as a free agent, rebounding with a .324 campaign, three home runs and 42 RBI in 79 games in 1971. However, Oakland released him at the end of 1972 spring training; he signed with the Cubs again in July, but played only a month before being traded to the Baltimore Orioles, where he would spend the next three seasons.

In Baltimore, he served as the designated hitter from 1973 to 1975, finishing third in the 1973 batting race with a .306 mark and placing tenth in the MVP vote. Then in 1974, he was second in the American League with 181 hits. Also in 1974, he won the Outstanding Designated Hitter Award (later renamed for Edgar Martínez). He played in two American League Championship Series (both times, in 1973 and 1974, the Orioles lost to the eventual World Series champion Oakland Athletics). The Orioles released him in 1976 spring training, and he signed with the Yankees but did not play for them. From June to September he hit .265 with three home runs and 26 RBI in 72 games with the California Angels before ending the season with the Kansas City Royals who released him on January 17, 1977.

After being released by the Royals, having played for ten different teams in eighteen seasons, Davis retired from baseball. He occasionally expressed resentment for his numerous moves, remarking late in his career: "I'm very bitter, bitter as hell. Why do I keep getting released? Don't ask me no reason why." But he conceded his reputation as having a casual style of play, noting, "the lazier I felt the better I hit", and admitting that he often went into the clubhouse to read and even to shave between at bats as designated hitter with Baltimore.

=== Post-retirement career in baseball ===
Davis stayed in baseball after retiring as a player. He worked for the Dodgers as a minor-league instructor and also as part of the community relations department. He also served one year as the hitting coach for the 1981 Seattle Mariners before returning to work for the Dodgers.

== Personal life ==
Davis was married twice and had six children. He had four with his first wife, three daughters and a son: Lauren, Carlyn, Leslie, and Herman III; and two daughters, Morgana and Noelle, with his second wife, Carol.

He died on April 3, 2022 in Phoenix, Arizona, aged 83. Davis was survived by his second wife, his children, and a number of grandchildren.

== See also ==
- List of Major League Baseball batting champions
- List of Major League Baseball annual runs batted in leaders
- List of Major League Baseball career hits leaders
- List of Major League Baseball career runs batted in leaders
