= Donald M. Kerr (conservationist) =

American wildlife biologist and conservationist

- Don Kerr High Desert Museum founder
- Born: 1946; Portland, Oregon, US
- Died: February 4, 2015 (aged 69); Bend, Oregon, US
- Education: Oregon State University
- Occupation: Wildlife biologist
- Board member of: High Desert Museum

Donald M. Kerr (1946 – February 4, 2015) was an American wildlife biologist and conservationist. He founded the High Desert Museum in Bend, Oregon. Kerr led the museum for sixteen years, helping it develop and expand to become one of Central Oregon's most popular tourist attractions. The museum’s Birds of Prey Center and a high desert conservation award are named in his honor.

== Early life ==
Kerr was born in Portland, Oregon, in 1946. He was a third generation Oregonian. At the age of 12, he became interested in falconry when a teacher brought a live falcon to class. That experience sparked a broader interest in wildlife and nature in general. In high school, Kerr raised a wolf cub as a biology project. He attended Oregon State University, where he graduated with a bachelor's degree in biology and a minor in journalism in 1969.

After graduating from Oregon State University, Kerr went to work at Portland’s Washington Park Zoo (now called the Oregon Zoo). He later took a job with the Nature Conservancy as a wildlife biologist. In the late 1970s, Kerr moved to Central Oregon with the idea of creating a museum with living animals exhibited in their natural environments.

== High Desert Museum ==
In 1974, Kerr founded the Western Natural History Institute. After five years of fund raising, he persuaded the Brooks-Scanlon Lumber Company to donate 135 acres (55 ha) of timberland for a nature museum site. The property was located 5 miles (8.0 km) south of Bend just east of U.S. Route 97. Construction of the museum began in May 1982. The museum building was completed and opened its doors to the public later that year. Originally, the museum was called the Oregon High Desert Museum. However, the museum's name was later changed to the High Desert Museum to highlight the fact that the high desert environment stretches across a large part of the western United States.

Kerr directed the museum for sixteen years. During his tenure, the museum grew rapidly. It was one of the first museums in the United States to merge indoor and outdoor wildlife exhibits with an interactive living history program. In 1989, a new high desert history wing was added to the museum. It became the Earle A. Chiles Spirit of the West Center, providing space for a series of western history dioramas as well as several rooms for temporary exhibits. In 1991, another wing was built to house an extensive collection of Native American artifacts donated to the museum by Doris Swayze Bounds. By that time, the museum was hosting approximately 100,000 visitors annually.

In the early 1990s, Kerr served on the board of directors for the Mid-Oregon Indian Historical Society as well as Oregon’s State Parks and Recreation Commission. In 1999, Oregon State University honored Kerr with the university’s Distinguished Service Award for his vision and leadership in establishing the High Desert Museum.

== Illness and death ==
In 1995, Kerr was infected with a viral form of encephalitis. The source of the infection was probably a small cut from the talons of a great horned owl that Kerr had been working with near the museum. After the infection, Kerr had trouble communicating and then began losing muscular coordination. He never recovered, eventually becoming an invalid. A year later, Kerr step down from his position as the museum's president due to his illness.

While he was unable to participate in the High Desert Museum's day-to-day operations, Kerr remained interested in the institution and its mission. Kerr died on February 4, 2015, in Bend, Oregon. A public memorial service for Kerr was held at the High Desert Museum on March 7, 2015.

== Legacy ==
In 2001, the museum named its new $1,200,000 birds of prey center in his honor. Today, the 7,500 square feet (700 m^{2}) Donald M. Kerr Birds of Prey Center houses the museum’s living collection of owls, falcons, hawks, eagles, and vultures as well as a number of environmental exhibits. The center also has a large classroom used for lectures and indoor wildlife demonstrations.

At the time of Kerr's death, the High Desert Museum was a 100,000-square-foot (9,300 m^{2}) facility with approximately .5 miles (0.80 km) of walking trails connecting the main museum with the birds of prey center and various outdoor exhibits. As of 2015, the museum attracted over 160,000 visitors each year, making it one of the most popular visitor destinations in central Oregon.

The High Desert Museum also presents the annual Donald M. Kerr Award. The award recognizes individuals whose volunteer activities have had a significant positive impact on the high desert environment and its resources. The award includes a $5,000 honorarium funded by the Earle A. Chiles Foundation.
