= Friend, Oregon =

Unincorporated community in the state of Oregon, United States

- Unincorporated community
- Location within Oregon Location within the United States
- Coordinates: 45°20′48″N 121°16′02″W
- Country: United States
- State: Oregon
- County: Wasco
- Elevation: 2,448 ft (746 m)
- Time zone: UTC-8 (Pacific (PST))
  - Summer (DST): UTC-7 (PDT)
- Area codes: 458 and 541
- GNIS feature ID: 1142483

Friend is an unincorporated community in Wasco County in the U.S. state of Oregon. Considered a ghost town, little remains of the community except the Friend Store, a one-room schoolhouse, and a cemetery.

Friend was named after George J. Friend. The first post office in the community, established in 1903, was on his homestead.

Friend was the end of the line on the Great Southern Railroad. The line was built in 1908 from Dufur, which connected to The Dalles. The depot was closed and service ended on January 5, 1928; the line was abandoned in 1935. Few signs of the track still exist.

== See also ==
- List of ghost towns in Oregon
