= Kingsley, Oregon =

Unincorporated community in the state of Oregon, United States

- Unincorporated community
- Location within Oregon Location within the United States
- Coordinates: 45°20′28″N 121°12′02″W
- Country: United States
- State: Oregon
- County: Wasco
- Elevation: 2,444 ft (745 m)
- Time zone: UTC-8 (Pacific (PST))
  - Summer (DST): UTC-7 (PDT)
- ZIP code: 97063
- Area codes: 458 and 541
- GNIS feature ID: 1122769

Kingsley was an unincorporated community in Wasco County, Oregon, United States, named by E.M. Wilson in 1878. Wilson named it for Charles Kingsley, because she had enjoyed reading his book Westward Ho!. It was located just north of Tygh Valley. Nothing remains at the site today except a cemetery.
