= Chenoweth, Oregon =

Community in Oregon, United States

Chenoweth, Oregon Chenowith (locally)
- Census-designated place (CDP)
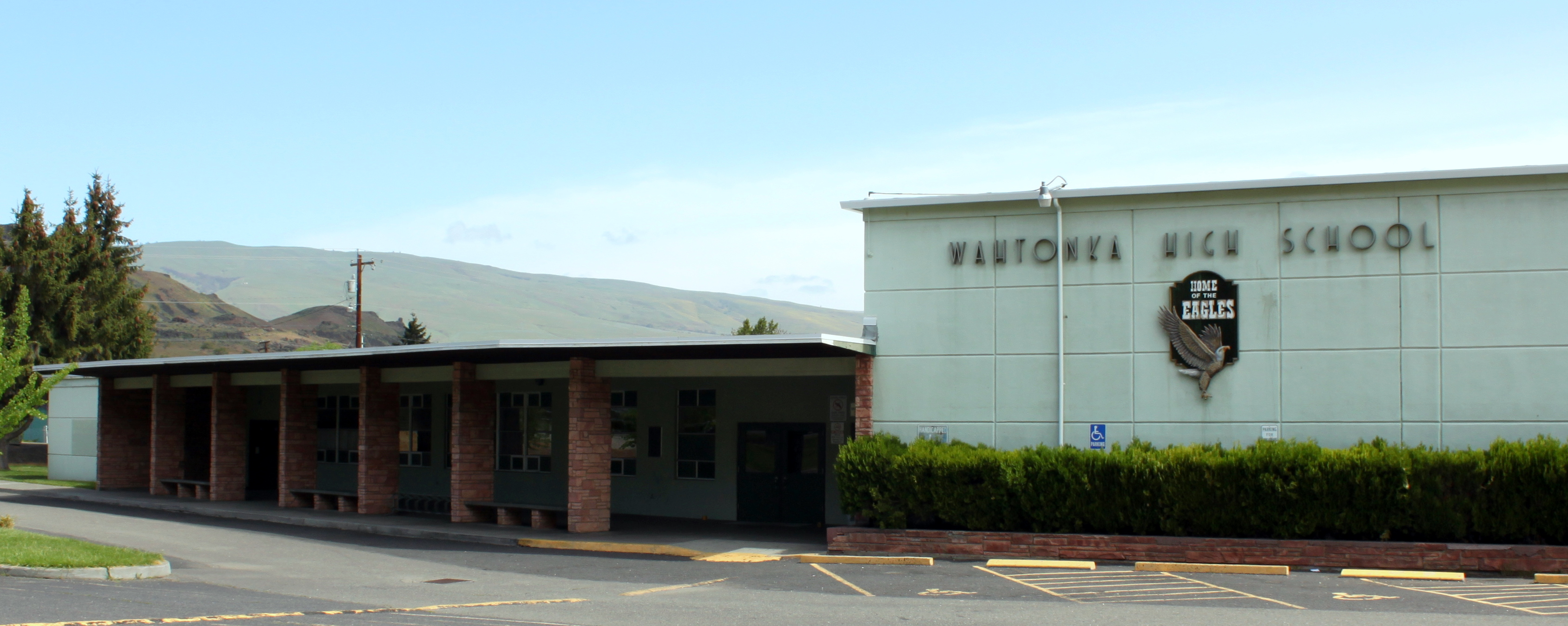
- Wahtonka High School in Chenoweth

- Location of Chenoweth, Oregon
- Coordinates: 45°37′20″N 121°14′12″W
- Country: United States
- State: Oregon
- County: Wasco

Area
  - Total: 5.64 sq mi (14.62 km^{2})
  - Land: 5.63 sq mi (14.58 km^{2})
  - Water: 0.015 sq mi (0.04 km^{2})
- Elevation: 784 ft (239 m)

Population (2020)
  - Total: 1,975
  - Density: 350.8/sq mi (135.45/km^{2})
- Time zone: UTC-8 (Pacific (PST))
  - Summer (DST): UTC-7 (PDT)
- ZIP code: 97058
- Area codes: 458 and 541
- FIPS code: 41-12800
- GNIS feature ID: 2408016

Chenoweth is an unincorporated community in Wasco County, Oregon, United States. Locally the alternative spelling of Chenowith is used, such as for the 'Chenowith Elementary School'. For statistical purposes, the United States Census Bureau has defined Chenoweth as a census-designated place (CDP). The census definition of the area may not precisely correspond to local understanding of the area with the same name. As of the 2020 census, Chenoweth had a population of 1,975.

== History ==
The town of Chenoweth was named after Justin Chenoweth (1825–1898), an Illinois native. He was the son of John Chenoweth and Nancy Rose, who homesteaded in the area in the 1850s and '60s. Justin Chenoweth married Mary H. Vickers on December 9, 1852, in Wasco County.

== Geography ==
According to the United States Census Bureau, the CDP has a total area of 6.7 square miles (17 km^{2}), of which, 6.7 square miles (17 km^{2}) of it is land and 0.15% is water.

== Demographics ==
Historical population
Census	Pop.	Note	%±
2020	1,975		—
U.S. Decennial Census

As of the census of 2000, there were 3,412 people, 1,311 households, and 942 families residing in the CDP. The population density was 510.5 inhabitants per square mile (197.1/km^{2}). There were 1,387 housing units at an average density of 207.5 units per square mile (80.1 units/km^{2}). The racial makeup of the CDP was 87.40% White, 0.18% African American, 1.91% Native American, 0.88% Asian, 0.29% Pacific Islander, 6.86% from other races, and 2.49% from two or more races. Hispanic or Latino of any race were 10.90% of the population.

There were 1,311 households, out of which 33.9% had children under the age of 18 living with them, 52.6% were married couples living together, 14.3% had a female householder with no husband present, and 28.1% were non-families. 23.2% of all households were made up of individuals, and 12.1% had someone living alone who was 65 years of age or older. The average household size was 2.56 and the average family size was 2.98.

In the CDP, the population was spread out, with 26.2% under the age of 18, 8.5% from 18 to 24, 25.1% from 25 to 44, 23.5% from 45 to 64, and 16.6% who were 65 years of age or older. The median age was 39 years. For every 100 females, there were 91.3 males. For every 100 females age 18 and over, there were 87.6 males.

The median income for a household in the CDP was $32,794, and the median income for a family was $41,552. Males had a median income of $38,856 versus $19,276 for females. The per capita income for the CDP was $15,497. About 15.4% of families and 15.8% of the population were below the poverty line, including 24.6% of those under age 18 and 2.2% of those age 65 or over.
