= South Junction, Oregon =

Unincorporated community in the state of Oregon, United States

- Unincorporated community
- Location within Oregon Location within the United States
- Coordinates: 44°51′14″N 121°04′35″W
- Country: United States
- State: Oregon
- County: Wasco
- Elevation: 1,257 ft (383 m)
- Time zone: UTC-8 (Pacific (PST))
  - Summer (DST): UTC-7 (PDT)
- Area codes: 458 and 541
- Coordinates and elevation from United States Geological Survey

South Junction is an unincorporated community in Wasco County, in the U.S. state of Oregon. It lies at the west end of South Junction Road on the east bank of the Deschutes River across from the mouth of the Warm Springs River. The road connects South Junction with Shaniko Junction to the northeast, where U.S. Route 97 and U.S. Route 197 intersect.

South Junction was named for a junction point between two competing rail lines, the Great Northern Railway and the Union Pacific that built along opposite sides of the Deschutes River. The Oregon Trunk Railway, which extended 150 miles (240 km) from the Columbia River to Bend, began as separate lines in 1909. After the Union Pacific abandoned its separate line with separate station names, the other stations in the vicinity were Jersey, Kaskela, and North Junction to the north and Coleman, Mecca, and Vanora to the south. South Junction had a post office that operated intermittently between 1911 and 1974.

The Bureau of Land Management administers a camping area at South Junction, 10 miles (16 km) west of Shaniko Junction. It has 11 campsites and a vault toilet but no drinking water and no boat launch.
