= Wasco County, Oregon =

County in Oregon, United States

- County
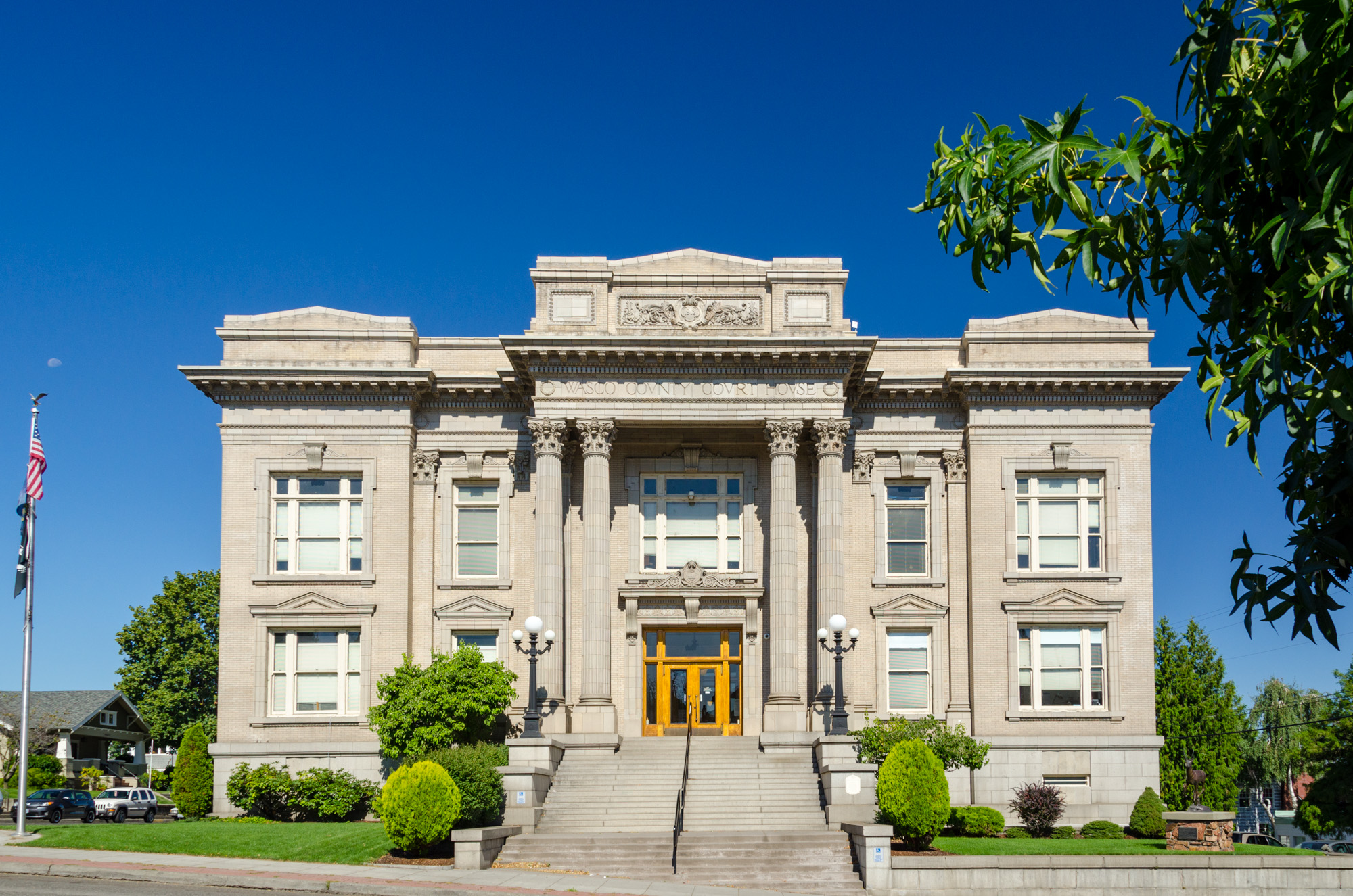
- Wasco County Courthouse in The Dalles

- Location within the U.S. state of Oregon
- Coordinates: 45°10′N 121°10′W
- Country: United States
- State: Oregon
- Founded: January 11, 1854
- Named for: Wasco people
- Seat: The Dalles
- Largest city: The Dalles

Area
  - Total: 2,395 sq mi (6,200 km^{2})
  - Land: 2,382 sq mi (6,170 km^{2})
  - Water: 14 sq mi (36 km^{2}) 0.6%

Population (2020)
  - Total: 26,670
  - Estimate (2025): 26,310 ▼
  - Density: 11.20/sq mi (4.323/km^{2})
- Time zone: UTC−8 (Pacific)
  - Summer (DST): UTC−7 (PDT)
- Congressional district: 2nd
- Website: www.wascocountyor.gov

Wasco County is one of the 36 counties in the U.S. state of Oregon. As of the 2020 census, the population was 26,670. Its county seat is The Dalles. The county is named for a local tribe of Native Americans, the Wasco, a Chinook tribe who live on the south side of the Columbia River. It is near the Washington state line. Wasco County comprises The Dalles Micropolitan Statistical Area.

== History ==
Celilo Falls on the Columbia River served as a gathering place and major trading center for the local Native Americans, including the Wasco, Paiute, and Warm Springs tribes, for thousands of years. These rapids came to be named Les Grandes Dalles de la Columbia or "The Great Falls of the Columbia" by the French Canadian fur traders.

The Dalles initially served as a way station on the Oregon Trail as it approached the Willamette Valley. The construction of the Barlow Road over the Cascade Range in 1845, and the Donation Land Claim Act of 1850 encouraged families to settle in the area. Over the following years, Wasco County was a major transportation hub for both river and inland traffic.

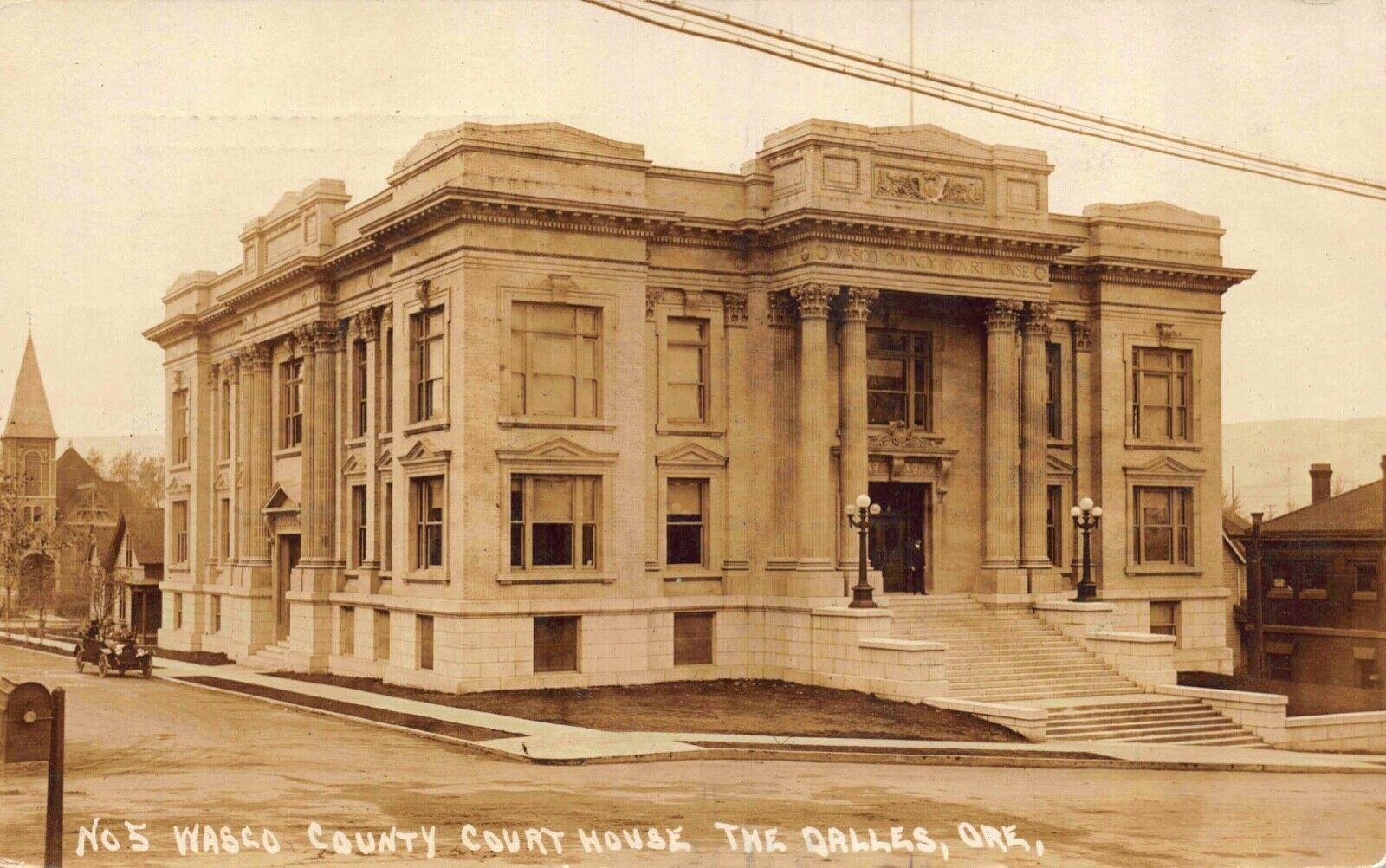
The Wasco County courthouse was shown on this postcard mailed on August 12, 1916.

The Oregon Territorial Legislature created Wasco County on January 11, 1854, from the parts of Clackamas, Lane, Linn and Marion counties, that were east of the Cascade Range. At the time of its creation, it was the largest county in the United States, consisting of 130,000 square miles (340,000 km^{2}) that stretched clear to the Rocky Mountains. Its northern border was the Washington Territory line (the Columbia River). When Dakota Territory (including present-day Wyoming) was created in 1861, Idaho Territory in 1863, and Montana Territory in 1864, the parts of Wasco County east of the present Oregon boundaries were ceded to those territories. Other Oregon counties were split away, and Wasco was reduced to its current size.

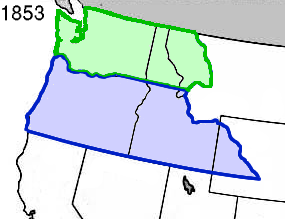
Oregon Territory is shown in blue. Everything east of the Cascades was part of the original Wasco County.

Dates of Creation of Other Eastern Oregon Counties
County	Date of Division
Baker	September 22, 1862
Umatilla	September 27, 1862
Grant	October 14, 1864
Lake	October 24, 1874
Crook	October 24, 1882
Morrow	February 16, 1885
Gilliam	February 25, 1885
Sherman	February 25, 1889
Hood River	June 23, 1908

The Dalles was designated the county seat with the creation of the county, and has been its only location.

The river traffic on the Columbia River was profoundly affected in 1935 by the building of Bonneville Dam in Multnomah County and by The Dalles Dam in 1957 in Wasco County (which submerged Celilo Falls).

Wasco County attracted international attention in the 1980s, when the Indian godman Osho (also known as Rajneesh) established the Rajneeshpuram intentional community at a marginal ranch originally called "The Big Muddy". Disagreements with the county government and other residents over zoning rules and building codes escalated, while his followers, known as Rajneeshees, settled en bloc in Antelope and were able to elect a majority of the town councillors and change its name to Rajneesh. When the Rajneeshees subsequently recruited homeless people from across the United States to settle at Rajneeshpuram, it was widely seen as an attempt to use the ballot box to seize control of the county. An intentional outbreak of salmonella in salad bars at ten restaurants in The Dalles in 1984 was traced to Rajneesh's assistant Ma Anand Sheela.

Rajneesh was arrested as he was fleeing the U.S. in 1985 and he was subsequently indicted along with seven followers for immigration crimes by a federal grand jury. A separate grand jury in Wasco County charged three Rajneeshees of attempted murder. Rajneesh entered an Alford plea and was given a suspended sentence on condition that he leave the country.

The former Rajneesh ranch is now known as "Washington Family Ranch". It is owned and operated by Young Life Ministries, a Christian organization providing camp services for youth.

== Geography ==
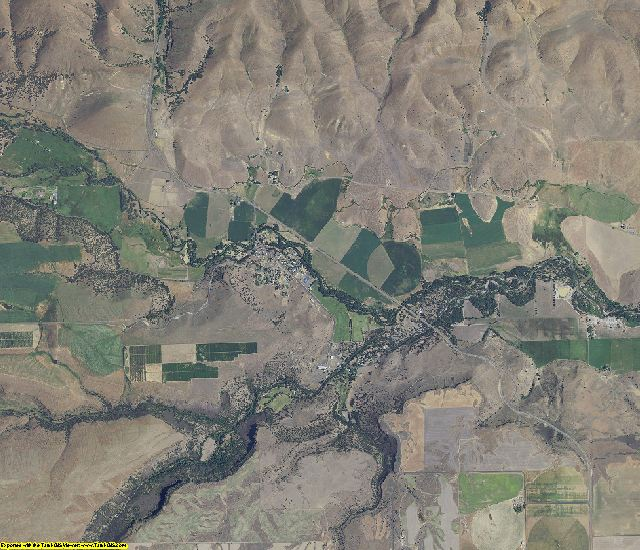
An aerial view of the county

According to the United States Census Bureau, the county has a total area of 2,395 square miles (6,200 km^{2}), of which 2,382 square miles (6,170 km^{2}) is land and 14 square miles (36 km^{2}) (0.6%) is water. The northern boundary with Washington is the Columbia River (the state line).

=== Adjacent counties ===
- Klickitat County, Washington - north
- Sherman County - east
- Gilliam County - east
- Wheeler County - southeast
- Jefferson County - south
- Marion County - southwest
- Clackamas County - west
- Hood River County - west

=== National protected area ===
- Mount Hood National Forest

== Demographics ==
Historical population
Census	Pop.	Note	%±
1860	1,689		—
1870	2,509		48.5%
1880	11,120		343.2%
1890	9,183		−17.4%
1900	13,199		43.7%
1910	16,336		23.8%
1920	13,648		−16.5%
1930	12,646		−7.3%
1940	13,069		3.3%
1950	15,552		19.0%
1960	20,205		29.9%
1970	20,133		−0.4%
1980	21,732		7.9%
1990	21,683		−0.2%
2000	23,791		9.7%
2010	25,213		6.0%
2020	26,670		5.8%
2025 (est.)	26,310	▼	−1.3%
U.S. Decennial Census; 1790–1960 1900–1990; 1990–2000 2010–2020

=== 2020 census ===
Wasco County, Oregon – Racial and ethnic composition Note: the US Census treats Hispanic/Latino as an ethnic category. This table excludes Latinos from the racial categories and assigns them to a separate category. Hispanics/Latinos may be of any race.
Race / Ethnicity (NH = Non-Hispanic)	Pop 1980	Pop 1990	Pop 2000	Pop 2010	Pop 2020	% 1980	% 1990	% 2000	% 2010	% 2020
White alone (NH)	20,434	19,474	19,967	19,556	18,703	94.03%	89.81%	83.93%	77.56%	70.13%
Black or African American alone (NH)	63	59	65	85	115	0.29%	0.27%	0.27%	0.34%	0.43%
Native American or Alaska Native alone (NH)	617	844	845	1,018	983	2.84%	3.89%	3.55%	4.04%	3.69%
Asian alone (NH)	114	235	189	191	248	0.52%	1.08%	0.79%	0.76%	0.93%
Native Hawaiian or Pacific Islander alone (NH)	x	x	116	142	185	x	x	0.49%	0.56%	0.69%
Other race alone (NH)	18	6	19	16	110	0.08%	0.03%	0.08%	0.06%	0.41%
Mixed race or Multiracial (NH)	x	x	376	462	1,309	x	x	1.58%	1.83%	4.91%
Hispanic or Latino (any race)	486	1,065	2,214	3,743	5,017	2.24%	4.91%	9.31%	14.85%	18.81%
Total	21,732	21,683	23,791	25,213	26,670	100.00%	100.00%	100.00%	100.00%	100.00%

As of the 2020 census, the county had a population of 26,670. Of the residents, 21.4% were under the age of 18 and 22.7% were 65 years of age or older; the median age was 42.3 years. For every 100 females there were 99.5 males, and for every 100 females age 18 and over there were 96.4 males. 65.2% of residents lived in urban areas and 34.8% lived in rural areas.

The racial makeup of the county was 74.3% White, 0.5% Black or African American, 4.2% American Indian and Alaska Native, 0.9% Asian, 0.7% Native Hawaiian and Pacific Islander, 8.1% from some other race, and 11.2% from two or more races. Hispanic or Latino residents of any race comprised 18.8% of the population.

There were 10,553 households in the county, of which 28.7% had children under the age of 18 living with them and 26.1% had a female householder with no spouse or partner present. About 28.1% of all households were made up of individuals and 13.9% had someone living alone who was 65 years of age or older.

There were 11,996 housing units, of which 12.0% were vacant. Among occupied housing units, 65.3% were owner-occupied and 34.7% were renter-occupied. The homeowner vacancy rate was 1.9% and the rental vacancy rate was 5.5%.

=== 2010 census ===
As of the 2010 census, there were 25,213 people, 10,031 households, and 6,540 families living in the county. The population density was 10.6 inhabitants per square mile (4.1/km^{2}). There were 11,487 housing units at an average density of 4.8 units per square mile (1.9 units/km^{2}). The racial makeup of the county was 86.1% white, 4.4% American Indian, 0.8% Asian, 0.6% Pacific islander, 0.4% black or African American, 5.2% from other races, and 2.5% from two or more races. Those of Hispanic or Latino origin made up 14.8% of the population. In terms of ancestry, 19.8% were German, 14.0% were English, 10.6% were Irish, 6.4% were American, and 5.0% were Swedish.

Of the 10,031 households, 29.3% had children under the age of 18 living with them, 49.4% were married couples living together, 10.9% had a female householder with no husband present, 34.8% were non-families, and 28.8% of households were made up of individuals. The average household size was 2.44 and the average family size was 2.98. The median age was 41.7 years.

The median household income was $42,133 and the median family income was $50,279. Males had a median income of $40,658 versus $27,996 for females. The per capita income for the county was $21,922. About 11.1% of families and 15.5% of the population were below the poverty line, including 20.1% of those under age 18 and 7.6% of those age 65 or over.

=== 2000 census ===
As of the 2000 census, there were 23,791 people, 9,401 households, and 6,505 families living in the county. The population density was 10 people per square mile (3.9 people/km^{2}). There were 10,651 housing units at an average density of 4 units per square mile (1.5/km^{2}). The racial makeup of the county was 86.58% White, 3.81% Native American, 0.80% Asian, 0.50% Pacific Islander, 0.30% Black or African American, 5.65% from other races, and 2.36% from two or more races. 9.31% of the population were Hispanic or Latino of any race. 17.8% were of German, 11.8% English, 9.8% American, 9.5% Irish and 5.0% Norwegian ancestry of the 9,401 households 30.20% had children under the age of 18 living with them, 54.80% were married couples living together, 9.90% had a female householder with no husband present, and 30.80% were non-families. 26.10% of households were one person and 11.50% were one person aged 65 or older. The average household size was 2.47 and the average family size was 2.96.

The age distribution was 25.40% under the age of 18, 7.40% from 18 to 24, 25.20% from 25 to 44, 25.40% from 45 to 64, and 16.70% 65 or older. The median age was 40 years. For every 100 females there were 97.90 males. For every 100 females age 18 and over, there were 95.10 males.

The median household income was $35,959 and the median family income was $42,412. Males had a median income of $36,051 versus $21,575 for females. The per capita income for the county was $17,195. About 10.30% of families and 12.90% of the population were below the poverty line, including 17.70% of those under age 18 and 7.30% of those age 65 or over.

== Government and infrastructure ==
The Northern Oregon Regional Corrections Facility (Norcor), a short-term jail, serves Wasco, Gilliam, Hood River, and Sherman counties.

Politically, Wasco is a swing county. No presidential candidate has won more than 55% of the county's vote since Ronald Reagan in 1984. From 1972 to 2008, it voted for the election's national winner every time except the drought and farm crisis-influenced 1988 election; Obama lost here by just 18 votes or 0.2% of the popular vote in 2012.

Wasco County is currently one of 11 counties in Oregon in which therapeutic psilocybin is legal.

United States presidential election results for Wasco County, Oregon
Year	Republican		Democratic		Third party(ies)	
Year	No.	%	No.	%	No.	%
1904	2,092	67.33%	536	17.25%	479	15.42%
1908	1,309	57.14%	764	33.35%	218	9.52%
1912	775	29.88%	929	35.81%	890	34.31%
1916	2,243	47.53%	2,287	48.46%	189	4.01%
1920	2,698	62.25%	1,434	33.09%	202	4.66%
1924	2,409	51.46%	1,185	25.32%	1,087	23.22%
1928	2,746	60.85%	1,699	37.65%	68	1.51%
1932	1,740	37.31%	2,776	59.52%	148	3.17%
1936	1,278	24.65%	3,573	68.92%	333	6.42%
1940	2,553	45.79%	3,001	53.82%	22	0.39%
1944	2,429	50.75%	2,313	48.33%	44	0.92%
1948	2,740	51.74%	2,438	46.03%	118	2.23%
1952	4,362	63.09%	2,517	36.40%	35	0.51%
1956	4,332	50.98%	4,165	49.02%	0	0.00%
1960	4,355	49.58%	4,426	50.39%	3	0.03%
1964	2,695	31.35%	5,890	68.51%	12	0.14%
1968	3,842	46.26%	3,918	47.17%	546	6.57%
1972	4,537	51.70%	3,749	42.72%	489	5.57%
1976	4,258	46.08%	4,560	49.35%	422	4.57%
1980	4,703	45.95%	4,336	42.36%	1,196	11.69%
1984	6,905	55.36%	5,526	44.31%	41	0.33%
1988	4,462	45.37%	5,141	52.28%	231	2.35%
1992	3,242	29.55%	4,663	42.50%	3,068	27.96%
1996	3,662	36.80%	4,967	49.91%	1,323	13.29%
2000	5,356	50.23%	4,616	43.29%	692	6.49%
2004	6,119	50.98%	5,691	47.42%	192	1.60%
2008	5,103	44.84%	5,906	51.90%	371	3.26%
2012	5,229	48.09%	5,211	47.93%	433	3.98%
2016	5,833	48.75%	4,781	39.96%	1,350	11.28%
2020	7,035	49.79%	6,604	46.74%	491	3.47%
2024	6,837	51.06%	6,069	45.32%	485	3.62%

== Economy ==
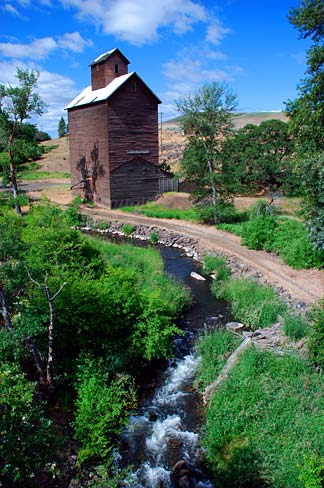
Boyd Loop Road grain elevator on Fifteenmile Creek, Wasco County

The county's economy is based upon agriculture (orchards, wheat farming, livestock ranching), lumber, manufacturing, electric power, transportation, and tourism. Aluminum production was previously a major support of the local economy, but electrical price fluctuations and a slump in global aluminum prices has forced the closing of a number of local aluminum foundries.

== Communities ==
=== Incorporated cities ===
- Antelope, previously known as Rajneesh from 1984 to 1986
- Dufur
- Maupin
- Mosier
- Shaniko
- The Dalles (county seat)

=== Census-designated places ===
- Chenoweth
- Pine Grove
- Pine Hollow
- Rowena
- Sportsmans Park
- Tygh Valley
- Wamic

=== Unincorporated communities ===
- Bakeoven
- Boyd
- Celilo Village
- Criterion
- Endersby
- Fairbanks
- Friend
- Kingsley
- Nansene
- Ortley
- Rice
- Simnasho
- South Junction
- Wapinitia

== See also ==
- National Register of Historic Places listings in Wasco County, Oregon
- 1984 Rajneeshee bioterror attack
