= Simnasho, Oregon =

Unincorporated community in the state of Oregon, United States

- Unincorporated community
- Location within Oregon Location within the United States
- Coordinates: 44°58′22″N 121°21′00″W
- Country: United States
- State: Oregon
- County: Wasco
- Elevation: 2,412 ft (735 m)
- Time zone: UTC-8 (Pacific (PST))
  - Summer (DST): UTC-7 (PDT)
- Area codes: 541 and 458
- GNIS feature ID: 1126986

Simnasho is an unincorporated community in Wasco County, in the U.S. state of Oregon. It lies at the intersection of Simnasho Road, Wapanitia Road, and Simnasho–Hot Springs Road within the Warm Springs Indian Reservation. The name comes from a Sahaptin language word meaning black hawthorn bush.

A post office named Sinemasho was established here in 1886 but closed in 1887. A post office named Simnasho opened here in 1894 and operated, "with one intermission" through 1954.

Simnasho was the reservation's seat of government, in the form of a Federal agent, until near the end of the 19th century, when the agency headquarters was relocated to the community of Warm Springs. Simnasho has had a school at various times since 1874, but the most recent grade school closed in 1999.

== Government ==
The reservation became self-governing in 1938. An 11-member tribal council is the main governing body for the reservation, which is divided into three districts—Simnasho, Agency, and Seekseekqua. Three members of the council are chiefs who serve for life, while eight are elected to three-year terms. Three of the elected members represent the Simnasho District. During the 2013–16 term, they are Evaline Patt (vice-chair of the council), Raymond Tsumpti Sr., and Orvie Danzuka. Warm Springs Chief Delvis Heath is the lifetime council member representing Simnasho.

== Education ==
Students from Simnasho and elsewhere on the reservation may attend school at Warm Springs K–8 Academy in Warm Springs or Madras High School in Madras. Both schools are part of Jefferson County School District 509–J. Warm Springs is about 25 miles (40 km) south of Simnasho, and Madras is another 15 miles (24 km), which makes for long commutes by schoolbus.

A separate school at Simnasho has come and gone several times. In 1874, the first Bureau of Indian Affairs (BIA) school for the whole reservation was at Simnasho. However, when the BIA headquarters was relocated to the unincorporated community of Warm Springs, the school moved too and became a boarding school, where "assimilation" was one of the Federal goals, and native traditions and languages were discouraged. Local residents have been more in control of the later schools. Built in the 1950s, Simnasho Elementary School became part of the Jefferson County School District in the 1960s. However, fluctuating enrollments led to further openings and closings. The most recent opening occurred in 1994, when 22 students enrolled, but the school board closed the school again in 1999, when enrollment dropped to 6.

== Culture ==
Simnasho has been the site of ceremonial activities, including harvest festivals. Churches in Simnasho include the Simnasho Longhouse and Simnasho Church.
