= Endersby, Oregon =

Unincorporated community in the state of Oregon, United States

- Unincorporated community
- Location within Oregon Location within the United States
- Coordinates: 45°29′32″N 121°09′07″W
- Country: United States
- State: Oregon
- County: Wasco
- Elevation: 974 ft (297 m)
- Time zone: UTC-8 (Pacific (PST))
  - Summer (DST): UTC-7 (PDT)
- Area codes: 541 and 458
- GNIS feature ID: 1136263

Endersby is an unincorporated community in Wasco County, in the U.S. state of Oregon. It lies along Eightmile Creek at the intersection of Endersby Cutoff and Eightmile Road, about 3 miles (5 km) north-northwest of the small city of Dufur. The cutoff road connects the community to U.S. Route 197.

Endersby was named for W. E. Endersby, a settler. A post office called Endersly, with an unexplained variant spelling, operated here from 1892 through 1906.

Endersby School, built as a grange hall in 1892, opened as a public school in 1907. It closed in 1935, after enrollment had dropped to 11 students, and the building then passed into private hands. In 1994, volunteers moved the building to Dufur, and its owner gave it to the Dufur Historical Society. A grant from the Meyer Memorial Trust enabled the society to restore the school, and in 2003 Endersby School became an exhibit at the Dufur Museum.
