= Great Southern Railroad =

Defunct Oregon railroad

The Great Southern Railroad was a 41-mile short-line which interchanged with the Oregon Railway and Navigation Company, later the Oregon–Washington Railroad and Navigation Company (OWR&N), in The Dalles, Oregon, United States. The rail line ran south along Fifteen Mile Creek through Boyd to Dufur, and on to the small community of Friend. Besides the railhead junction with OWR&N, the Great Southern also had connections with two steamship lines operating on the Columbia River; The Dalles, Portland & Astoria Navigation Co., and The Open River Transportation Co.

The railroad was established by John G. Heimrich, a late 19th Century entrepreneur of German ancestry. Construction of the railroad was started on April 8, 1904, and was completed on July 1, 1913 with the establishment of regular train service from The Dalles to Friend. The Great Southern served agricultural and timber interests on the Columbia Plateau south of The Dalles and eastern slopes of Mount Hood. The general offices for the Great Southern were located in The Dalles, Oregon. The General Officers of the company, listed in 1925, were as follows:

- President: John G. Heimrich
- Vice-President: Julius L. Meier
- 2nd Vice-President: S.A. Hull
- Secretary: George W. Joseph
- Treasurer General: John G. Heimrich
- Manager and Purchasing Agent: John G. Heimrich
- Auditor: A. Froembling

The Great Southern's revenues reached a peak in 1910, but leveled off into the early 1920s. With the introduction of regular bus service, and an increase in automobile and truck traffic between The Dalles and Dufur, revenues began to decline after 1921. Regular train service came to an end on January 5, 1928 with the closing of the depots at Dufur and Friend. Attempts to resurrect the line as The Dalles and Southern failed in 1933. The line was officially abandoned on September 30, 1935. Very little of the Great Southern remains to this day. The Dalles depot, which was moved from its original location to its current site at the base of Brewery Grade, is the most visible relic of this short-lived Oregon railroad.

== Great Southern motive power ==
- #1 Baldwin Locomotive Works 2-6-0 (ex Richmond, Fredericksburg and Potomac)
- #2 1893 Baldwin Locomotive Works 4-6-0 (ex Western New York and Pennsylvania)
- #4 1930 Plymouth Locomotive Works two-axle diesel switcher

== The Dalles and Southern motive power ==
- #2 1908 Lima Locomotive Works 2-8-0 (ex P.R. Lewis Construction Co.)

== Great Southern rolling stock ==
According to the 1925 Official Railway Equipment Register, the Great Southern owned a total of twenty-four freight cars, made up of three classes:

- Nine 36' Flat Cars - Series 111-115 (2 Odd Numbers), Series 121-133 (7 Odd Numbers)
- Twelve 36' Box Cars - Series 200-208 (5 Even Numbers), Series 210-222 (7 Even Numbers)
- Three 36' Stock Cars - Series 303,304,11677

== Station stops ==
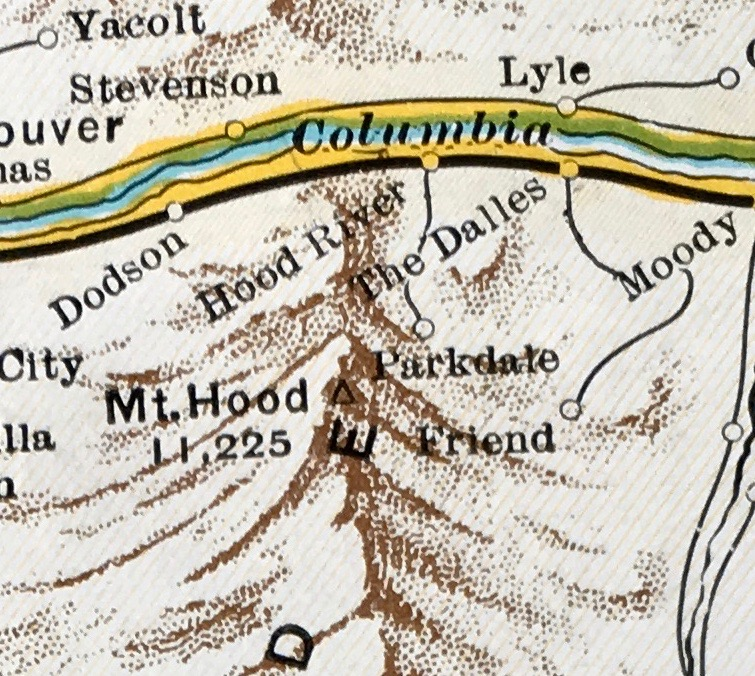
Route in 1931

The Dalles, Seufert, Petersburg, Fairbanks, Fulton, Brookhouse, Freebridge, Neabeck, Emerson, Wrentham, Rice, Boyd, Dufur, Annalore, Three Spring, Friend

== Bibliography ==
- Due, John F. and French, Giles. Rails to the Mid-Columbia Wheatlands: The Columbia Southern and Great Southern Railroads and the Development of Sherman and Wasco Counties, Oregon. Washington D.C.: University Press of America, Inc., 1979.
- Brown, Harold A., and Wilson, B.J. The Official Railway Equipment Register. New York: The Railway Equipment and Publication Company, January 1925.
