= Boyd, Oregon =

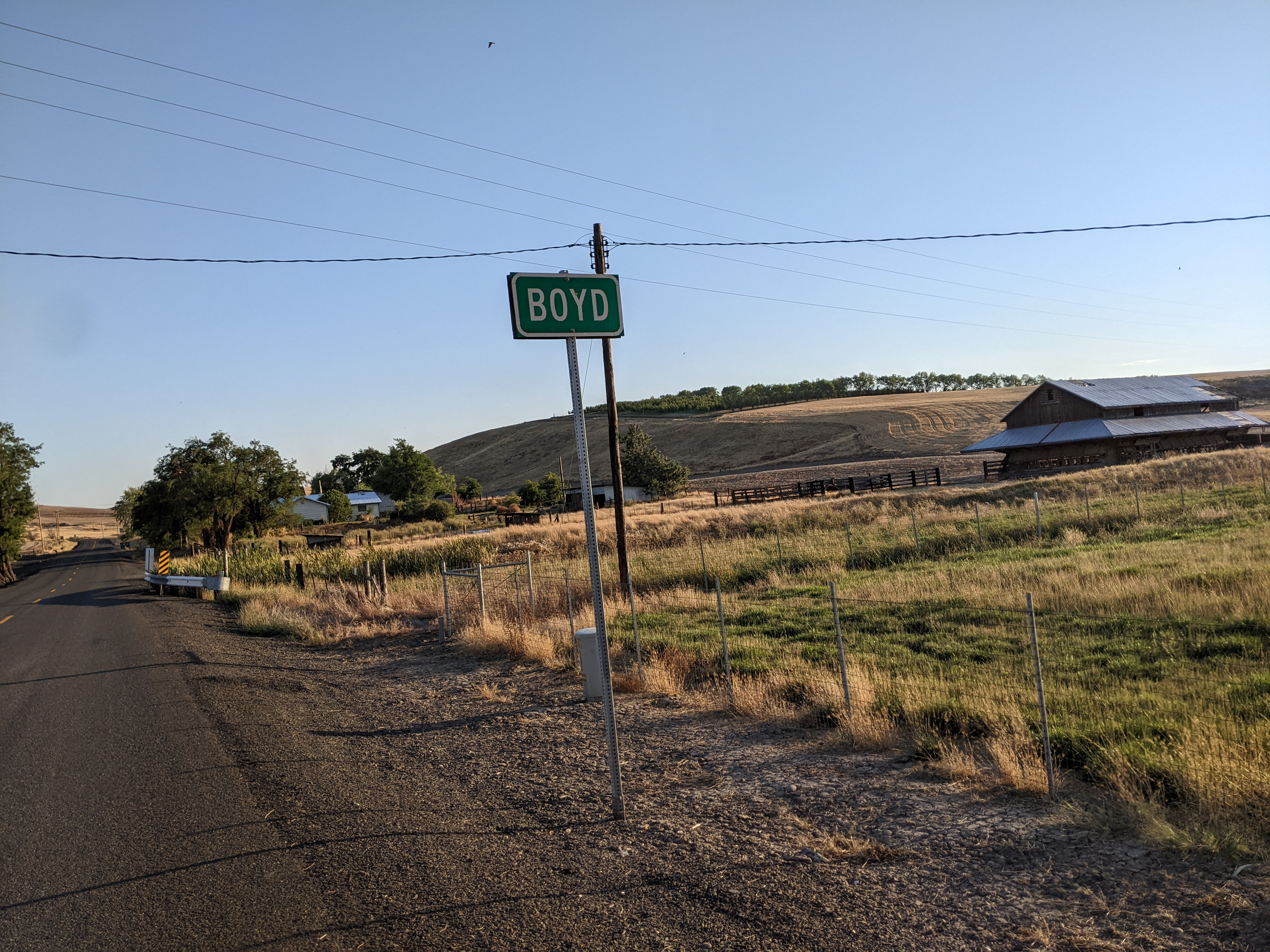
- Entrance to Boyd, Oregon

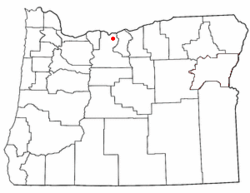
- Coordinates: 45.4892875°N 121.0822909°W
- Country: United States
- State: Oregon
- County: Wasco
- Established: 1861
- Disincorporated: 1955

Area
  - Total: 0 sq mi (0 km^{2})
- Elevation: 1,227 ft (374 m)

Population (2006)
  - Total: 0
- Time zone: UTC-8 (Pacific)
  - Summer (DST): UTC-7 (Pacific)
- ZIP code: 97021
- Area codes: 458 and 541

Boyd was a city in Wasco County, Oregon, United States, disincorporated in 1955, and now vacant except for a few abandoned homes, weathered outbuildings, and a derelict wooden grain elevator surrounded by the wheat fields, which still produce the grain that used to fill it. The site was recently bought and turned into farmland. The site of the former settlement is 9.5 miles (15.3 km) southeast of The Dalles, on the east side of U.S. Route 197 from which it is visible at a distance.

== History ==
During the western migration, settlers traversing the Barlow Road would have passed through or near Boyd as early as 1847, but the earliest recorded community was established over a decade later, when gold was discovered near John Day in 1861, and a larger strike the next year in Canyon City, Oregon.

The spot near the banks of Fifteenmile Creek that would become the community of Boyd was already a stagecoach stop, with an inn, Eleven Mile House. The area became a busy one when as many as 150 miners, 200 pack animals, and ten to twelve freight wagons left The Dalles for Canyon City every day. Freight wagon and pack team traffic brought the need for wayfarer accommodations, a blacksmith, wheelwrights and livery stables, so a community developed around Eleven Mile House. It also served the growing number of homesteaders farming in the immediate vicinity.

In 1863, a schoolhouse was built on Fifteenmile Creek east of Boyd. The school building was also used for religious services. The community continued to grow. A flour mill was built, ultimately purchased by a T.P. Boyd and his four sons, after whom the town was to be named. The U.S. Government granted a post office under that name, which was located in the general store.

The community still increasing in size, a town plat was drawn in 1895, several businesses sprang up, and a Methodist church established, sharing a pastor with the congregation in Dufur, Oregon. The Boyd school became District #21.

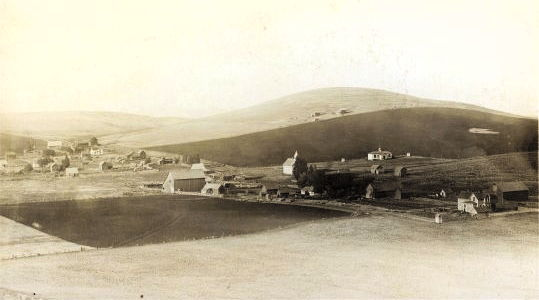
1908 photo of Boyd courtesy. Courtesy Gilhousen Family Association.

The Great Southern Railroad began passing directly through town in 1905 and carrying passengers, freight, mail and wheat, and Boyd thrived until the 1923 construction of The Dalles – California Highway, now U.S. Route 197, bypassed the town. The following years were difficult for the little town. The Great Depression took its toll on local business, already suffering from low wheat prices and decreasing numbers of travelers whom those businesses served. The convenience of trips to nearby Dufur and The Dalles made merchant services in Boyd superfluous. The Post office was closed in 1952.

== See also ==
- List of ghost towns in Oregon
