= High Desert Museum =

Regional museum in Oregon, USA

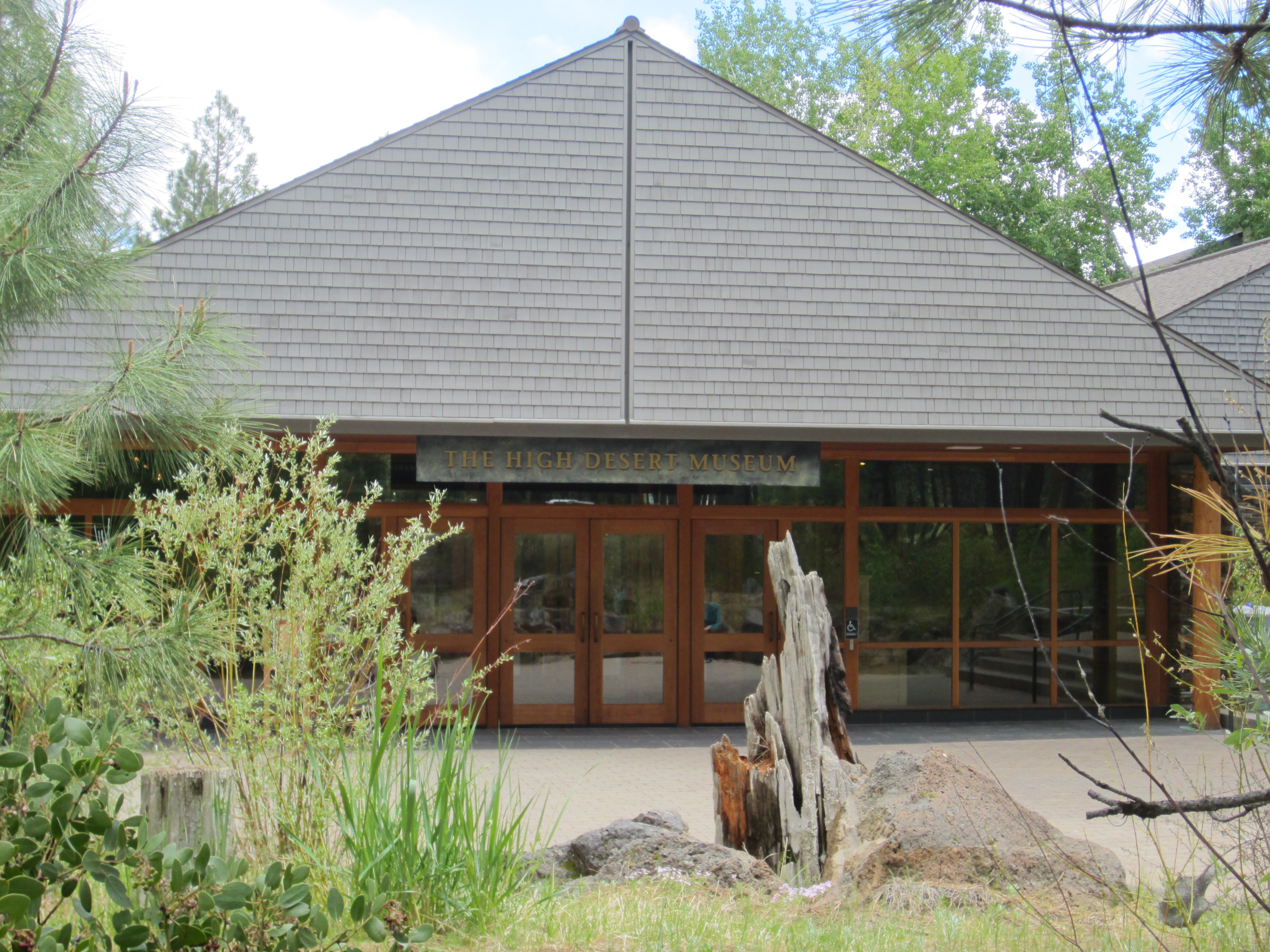
- Museum front entrance

- Location in Oregon High Desert Museum (the United States)
- Established: 1982
- Location: Bend postal address, Oregon, U.S.A.
- Coordinates: 43.96589°N 121.34148°W
- Type: Natural history
- Collection size: Approximately 30,000 artifacts
- Visitors: 170,000 per year
- Founder: Donald M. Kerr
- Director: Dana Whitelaw
- Website: High Desert Museum

The High Desert Museum is located near Bend, Oregon, United States. Opened in 1982, it brings regional wildlife, culture, art and natural resources together to promote an understanding of natural and cultural heritage of North America's high desert country. The museum includes indoor and outdoor exhibits of wildlife in natural-like habitats along with traveling exhibits and living history demonstrations. The museum is accredited by the American Alliance of Museums. It is also a Smithsonian Affiliate institution.

== History ==
The museum was founded by Donald M. Kerr, a native of Portland, Oregon. Kerr had a passion for natural history that inspired the creation of the museum. In 1974, Kerr established the Western Natural History Institute, and the High Desert Museum was an outgrowth of the institute opening in 1982. The museum was originally called the Oregon High Desert Museum; however, the name was later changed to recognize the regional nature of the high desert environment it highlights. Seated on a 135 acres (55 ha) site, the museum was at first made up mainly of outdoor exhibits and a small building.

In 1989, the main building was expanded with a 28,000-square-foot (2,600 m^{2}) addition, with the museum's attendance reaching 100,000 per year. The $5 million expansion, a gift from the Chiles Foundation, added the Earle A. Chiles Center on the Spirit of the West. In 1994, a five-year expansion campaign began to increase the size of the museum.

In 1999, the museum was accredited by the American Association of Museums (now the American Alliance of Museums). By 2016, the non-profit museum drew 170,000 visitors per year. In 2017, the High Desert Museum was selected as Smithsonian Affiliate institution. That designation gives the museum access to artifacts from the Smithsonian collection along with Smithsonian sponsored traveling exhibits and education programs. In Oregon there are only three Smithsonian Affiliate institutions. The other two are the Evergreen Aviation and Space Museum in McMinnville and the Rice Northwest Museum of Rocks and Minerals in Hillsboro.

In 2021, the museum was named as a recipient for the National Medal for Museum and Library Service.

As of September 14th, 2025, the museum is accredited by the Association of Zoos and Aquariums.

== Facilities ==
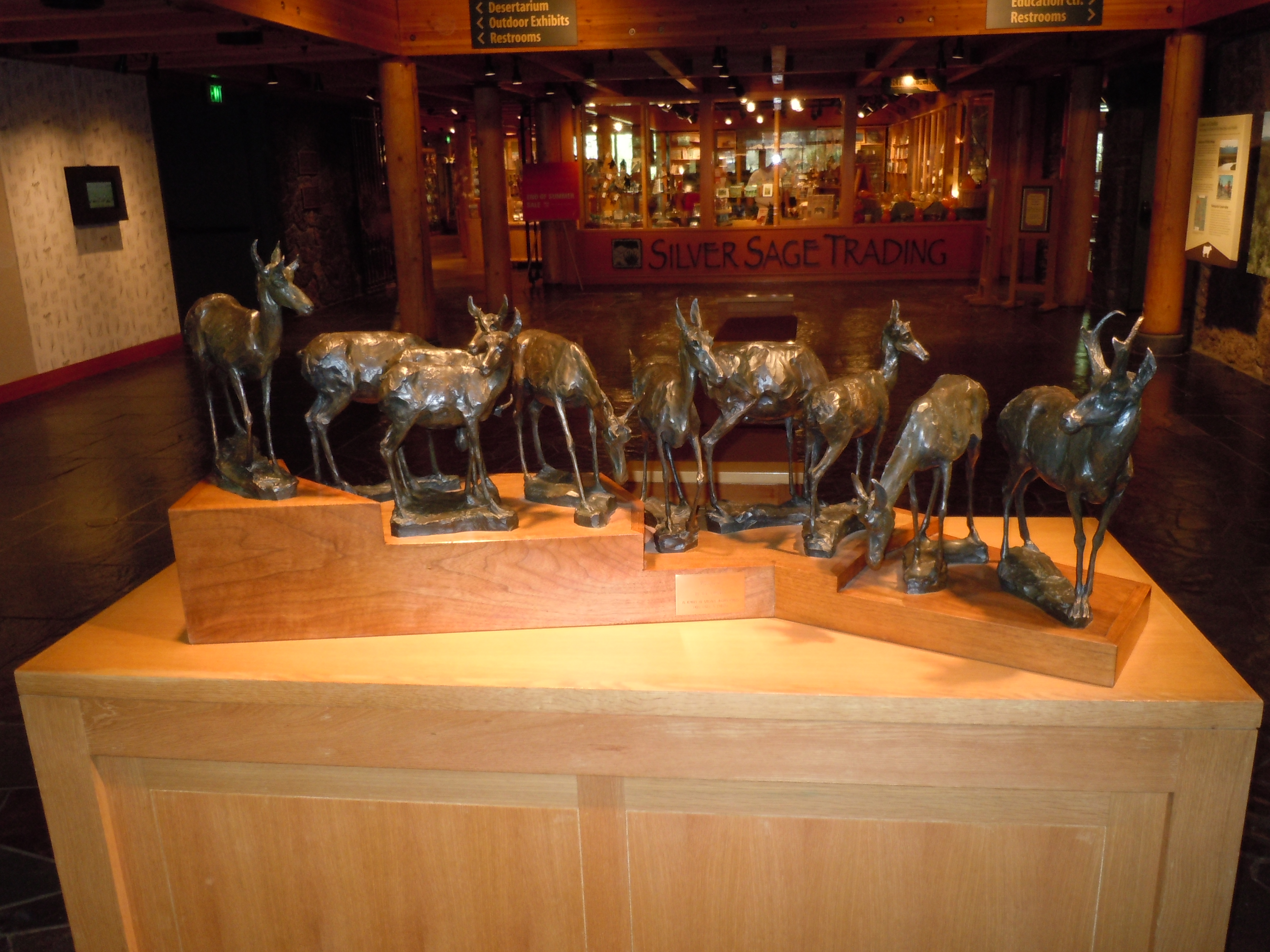
High Desert Museum lobby and gift shop

The High Desert Museum sits on 135 acres (0.55 km^{2}) of pine covered forest land in Central Oregon. South of Bend on U.S. Route 97, the museum includes various indoor and outdoor exhibits, a library, a desertarium, and a cafe. Portland's GHA Architects designed the original museum building. That structure contains slate flooring and walls built from volcanic rocks. The outdoor exhibits and various buildings are connected by a half-mile long paved path.

The entrance lobby is known as Schnitzer Hall. Visitors passing through the lobby can walk straight ahead into the Collins Gallery and museum gift shop or proceed to exhibits down corridors to the right or left. To the right of the main lobby is the Earle A. Chiles Center on the Spirit of the West and separate galleries for special traveling exhibits. To the left of the entrance is the Henry J. Casey Hall of Plateau Indians. The cafeteria is located beyond the Collins Gallery next to the gift shop. There is also a classroom located in this area of the building. Through the Collins Gallery to the left is an indoor desertarium with living desert animals on display. The exit at the far end of the desertarium leads to the Donald M Kerr Birds of Prey Center and the museum's outdoor exhibits.

== Collections ==
The museum has in excess of 18,500 artifacts in its collections. Artwork includes works from Edward Curtis, Edward Borein, Charles Marion Russell, Philip Hyde (photographer) and Alfred Jacob Miller among others. Historical artifacts include those of Native American origin and post Euro-American settlement of the region. Many of the Native American items are from the Doris Swayze Bounds Collection of American Indian Art and Artifacts.

=== Exhibits ===
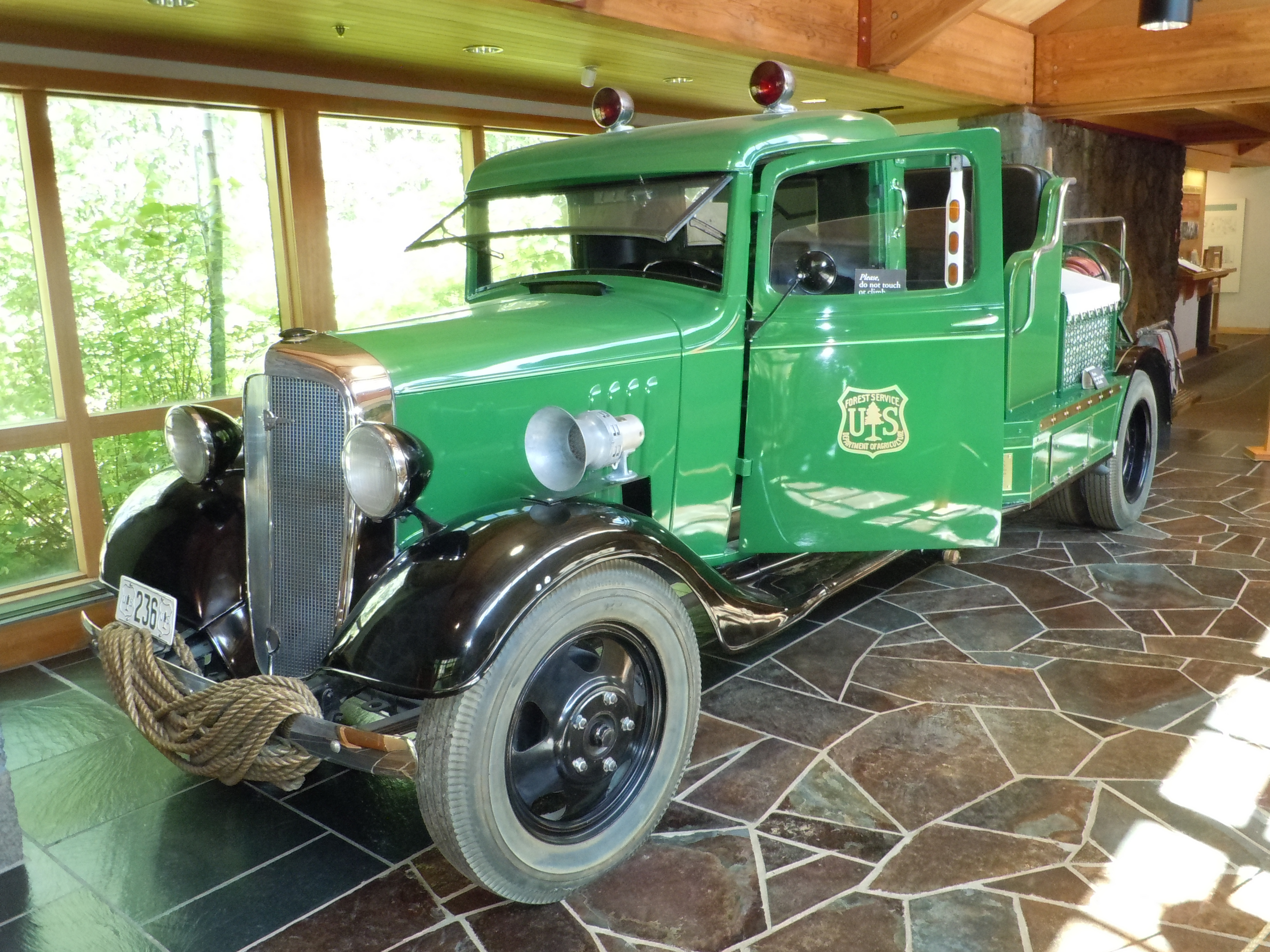
Vintage U.S. Forest Service fire truck

Exhibits focus on local culture, natural resources, wildlife, and art. The museum's indoor and outdoor exhibits of Native American, pioneer, and animal life are presented on a massive scale. A visitor can actually walk through an early 1860s town complete with blacksmith shop, Chinese mercantile, and stage coach stop. The Native American exhibit covers life on the land before the white man, life on a reservation, and the present day hot topic of Indian Casinos. There is also an impressive exhibit of Native American horse tack used for the Pendleton Round-Up that is unmatched for its craftsmanship, beauty, and individuality of design.

The High Desert Museum has a 53,000-square-foot (4,900 m^{2}) main building. Exhibits include a Forest Service fire truck, a stage coach, and a number of Native American history displays. The museum's Hall of Exploration and Settlement has displays highlighting a hundred years of high desert history. Scenes include a trapper's camp, survey party's camp, pioneer wagon train, a mining claim, an early western boomtown, and a high desert buckaroo camp.

Outside the museum building a quarter-mile trail follows a forest stream lined with aspens and ponderosa pines. Along the way visitors can stop at a number of exhibits and animal habitats. There is a total of 32,000 square feet (3,000 m^{2}) of outdoor exhibits and animal habitats. The popular wildlife exhibits feature three river otters, desert tortoises, a porcupine, and birds of prey. There is also a Native American encampment, a start-of-the-20th-century sawmill, logging equipment, homesteaders cabin, and a forestry pavilion.

==== Apollo astronaut training ====
Between July 6 and November 10, 2019, the museum held an exhibit about how the United States prepared astronauts for lunar landscapes by training in central Oregon, near Bend.

=== Gallery ===
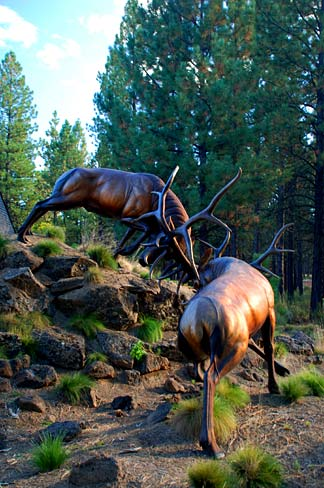
Bronze elk sculpture

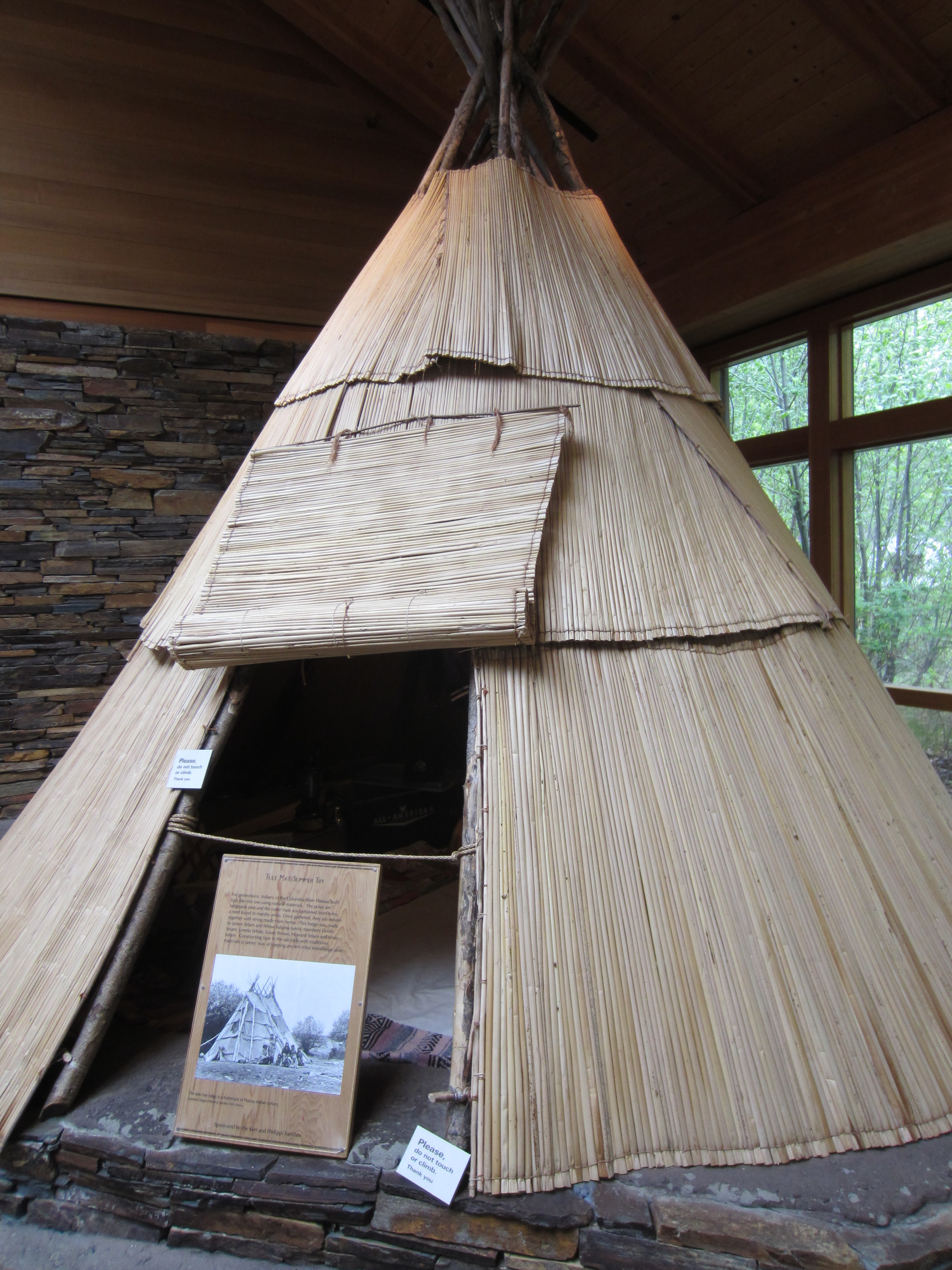
Native American exhibit

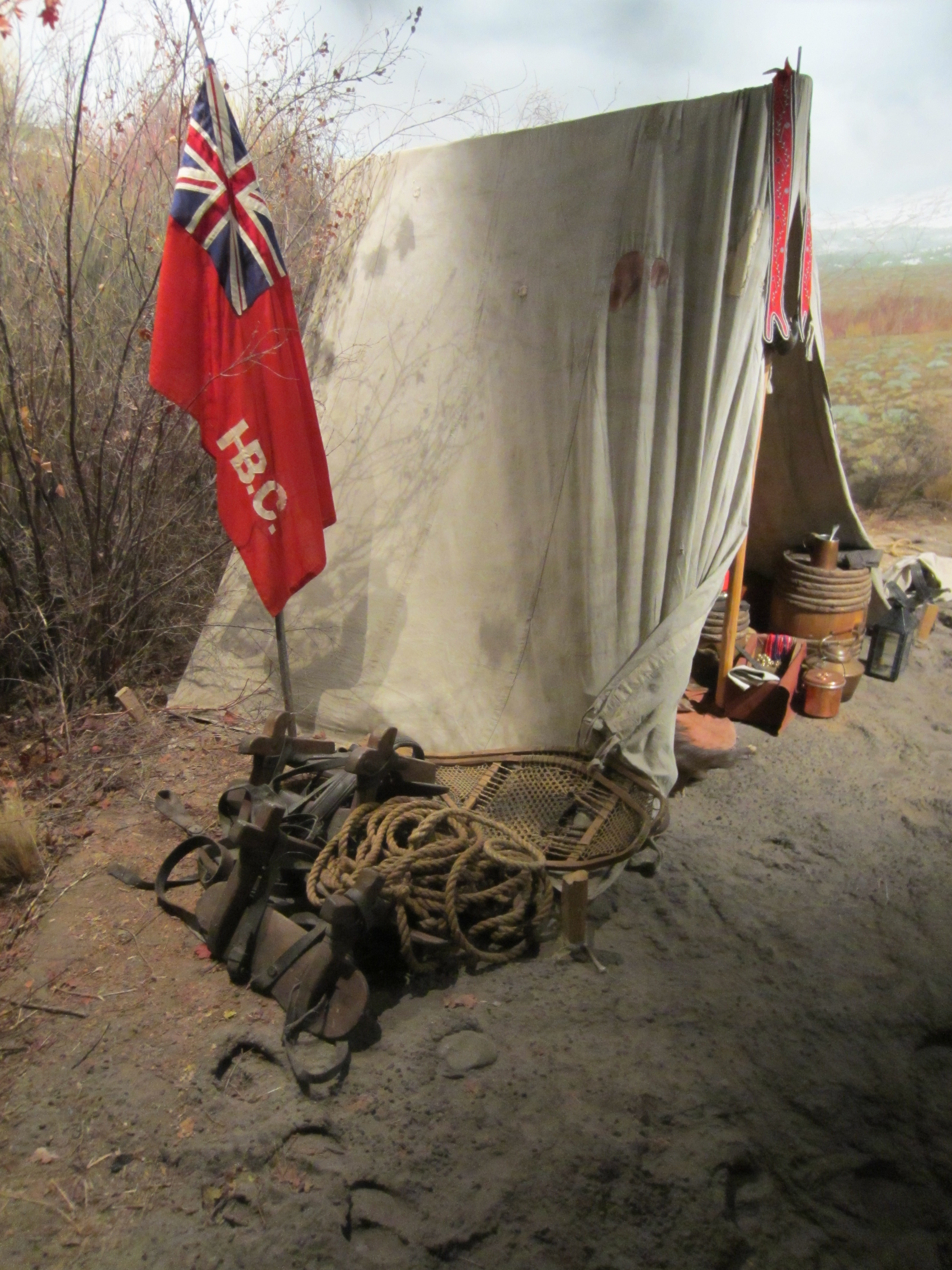
Early explorer diorama

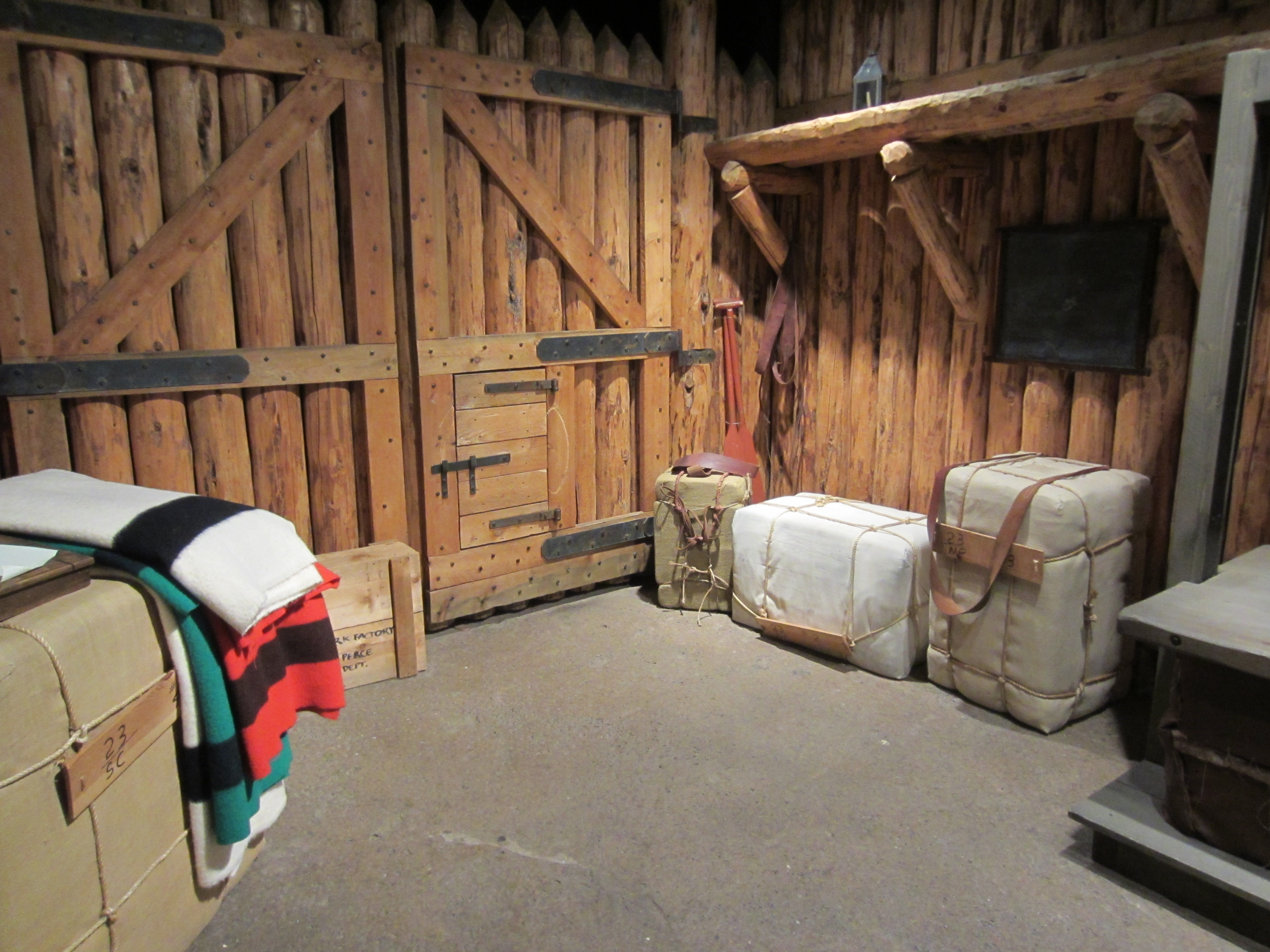
Fur trading post diorama

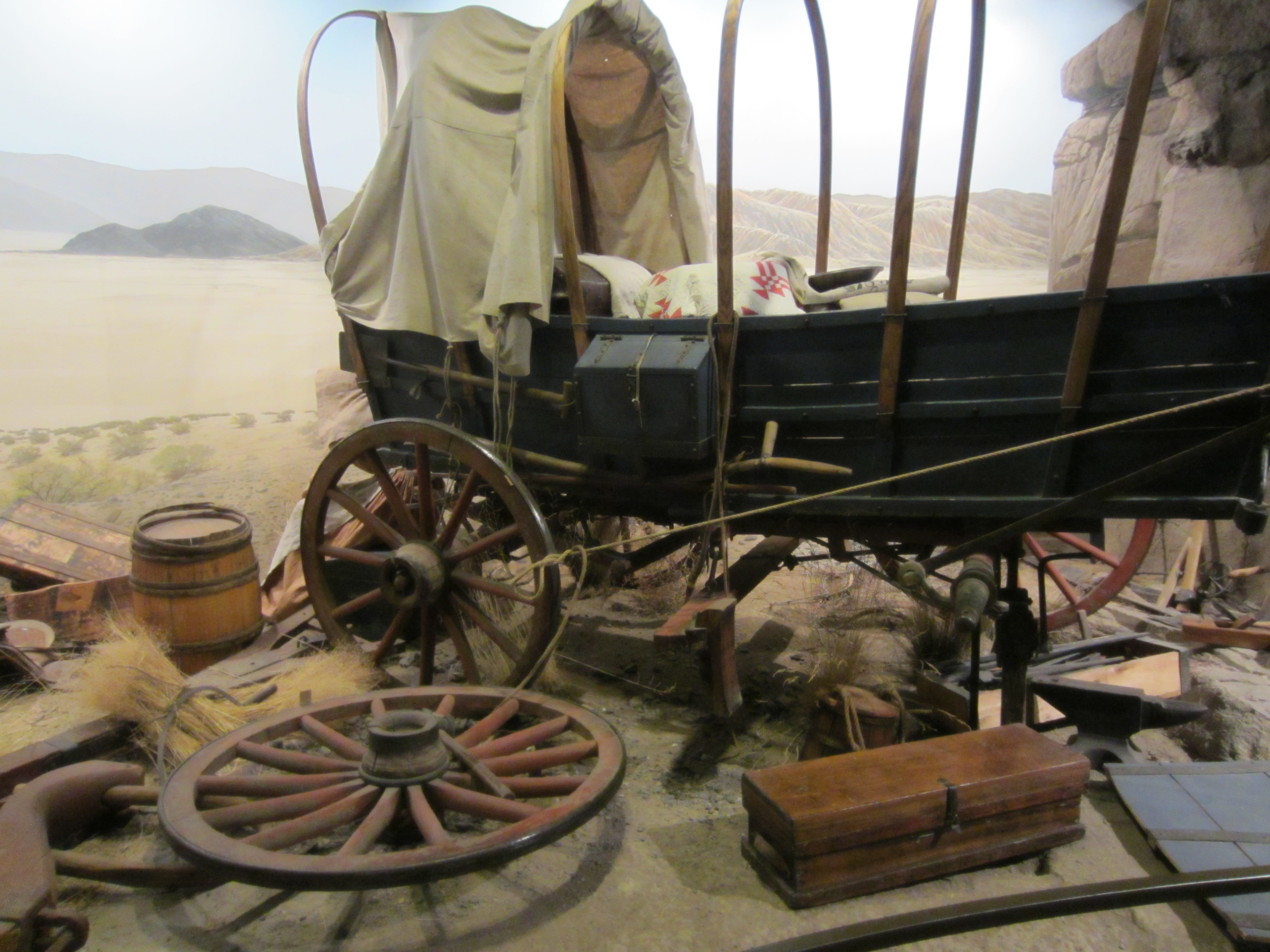
Oregon Trail diorama

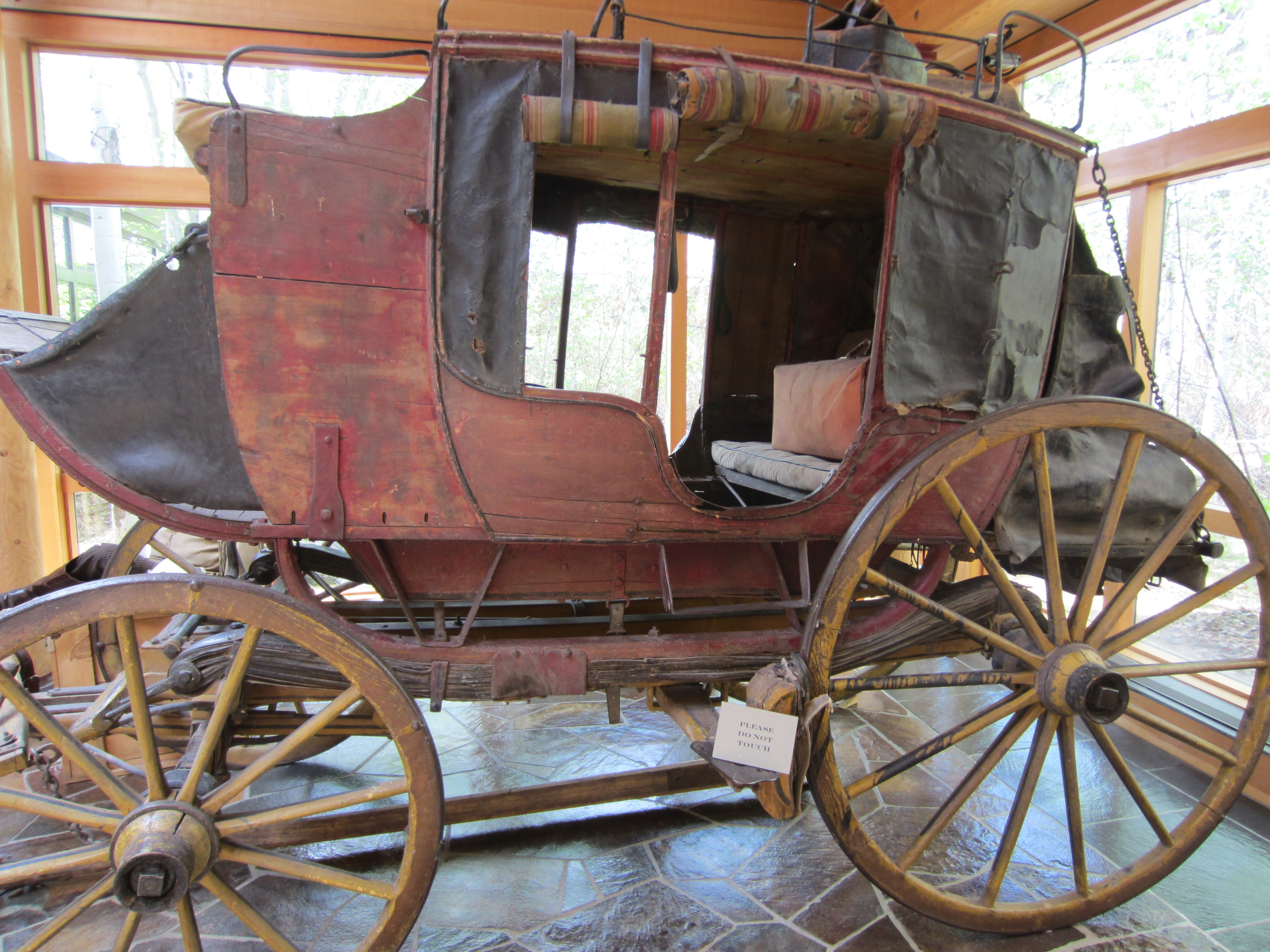
Stagecoach display

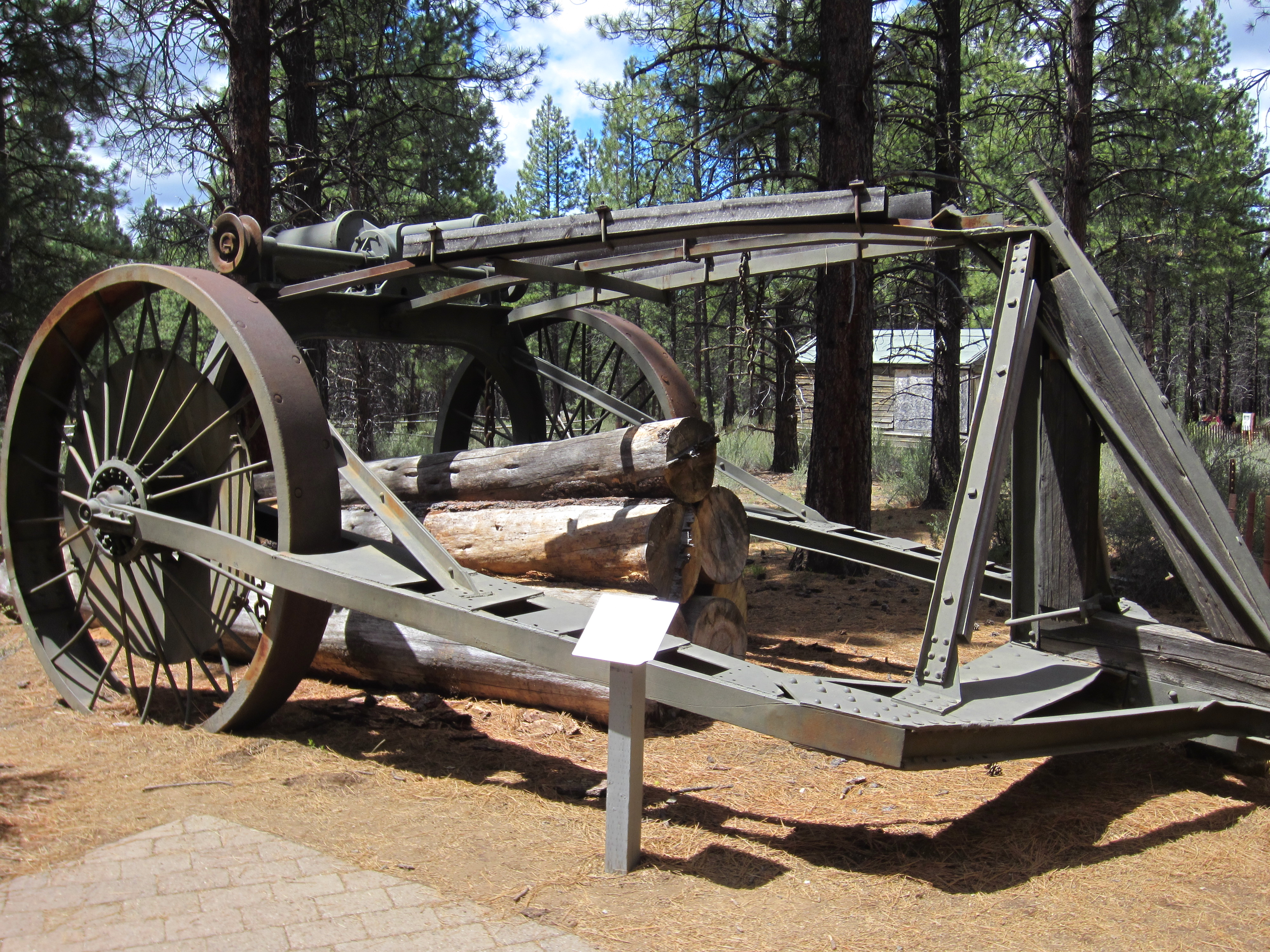
Old logging equipment

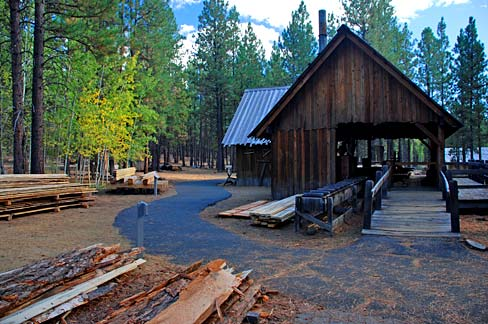
Museum sawmill

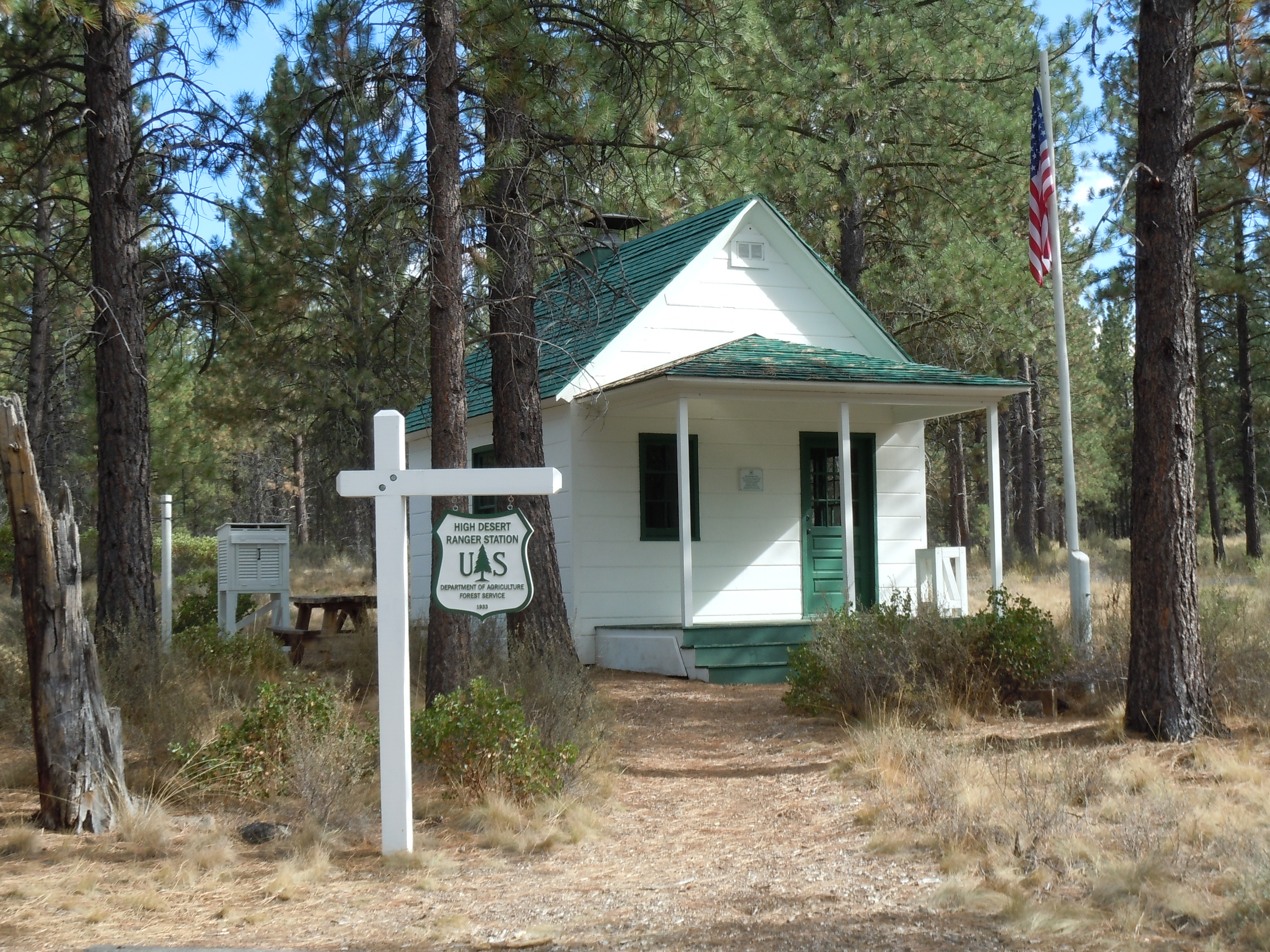
Restored guard station

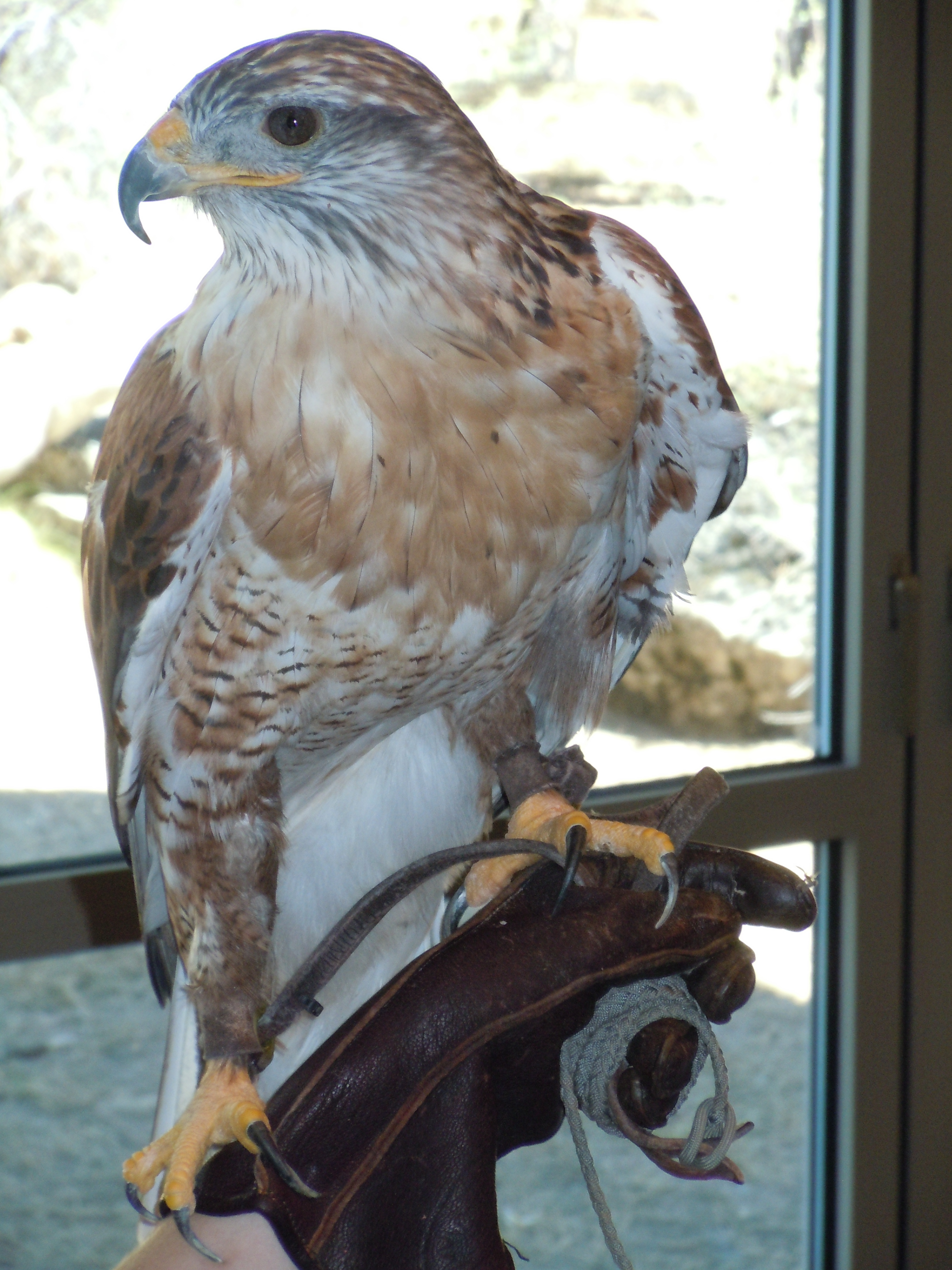
Live hawk exhibit
