= Sportsmans Park, Oregon =

- Census-designated place
- Location within Oregon Location within the United States
- Coordinates: 45°13′11″N 121°23′40″W
- Country: United States
- State: Oregon
- County: Wasco

Area
  - Total: 0.16 sq mi (0.42 km^{2})
  - Land: 0.15 sq mi (0.38 km^{2})
  - Water: 0.015 sq mi (0.04 km^{2})
- Elevation: 2,241 ft (683 m)

Population (2020)
  - Total: 76
  - Density: 518.6/sq mi (200.25/km^{2})
- Time zone: UTC-8 (Pacific (PST))
  - Summer (DST): UTC-7 (PDT)
- ZIP Code: 97063 (Tygh Valley)
- Area codes: 541/458
- FIPS code: 41-69387
- GNIS feature ID: 2804167

Sportsmans Park is an unincorporated community and census-designated place (CDP) in Wasco County, Oregon, United States. It was first listed as a CDP prior to the 2020 census. As of the 2020 census, Sportsmans Park had a population of 76.

The CDP is in western Wasco County, within Mount Hood National Forest, on the west shore of Rock Creek Reservoir. It is 12 miles (19 km) west of Tygh Valley via White River Road. The summit of Mount Hood is 18 miles (29 km) by air to the northwest.

== Demographics ==
Historical population
Census	Pop.	Note	%±
2020	76		—
U.S. Decennial Census
