= Oregon State University Foundation =

American private nonprofit corporation

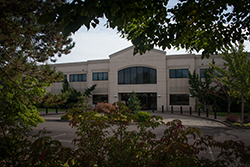
- Home of the OSU Foundation
- Formation: 15 October 1947
- Tax ID no.: 93-6022772
- Headquarters: Corvallis, Oregon, U.S.
- President/CEO: Shawn L. Scoville
- Key people: Dave Underriner, Chair of the Board of Trustees
- Website: fororegonstate.org

The Oregon State University Foundation is an American private nonprofit corporation associated with Oregon State University in Corvallis, Oregon. The OSU Foundation is governed by a volunteer Board of Trustees.

== History ==
In 1947, Robert M. Kerr, Edwin B. Aldrich and E. C. Sammons established the Oregon State College Foundation with the aid of OSC President A. L. Strand. They saw the foundation as a means of creating opportunities that the college could not fulfill with state funds alone. That year they collected the OSC Foundation's first donation, a sum of five dollars. The OSC Foundation officially became the Oregon State University Foundation on November 14, 1962.

The university's endowment began with $20,000 in 1961. It took 16 years to reach its first $1 million in total receipts, and four more years to double that amount. The university's composite endowment crossed the $1 billion milestone for the first time in 2024-25, totaling more than $1.01 billion as of June 30, 2025.

With university leaders, the OSU Foundation publicly launched Oregon State's first comprehensive fundraising campaign, The Campaign for OSU, on October 26, 2007, with a goal of $625 million. Donors exceeded the original goal in October 2010, nearly a year ahead of schedule, and the goal was increased to $850 million. In March 2012 the goal was raised to $1 billion. At OSU's annual State of the University address in Portland on January 31, 2014, President Edward J. Ray announced that campaign contributions had passed $1 billion, putting Oregon State with a group of 35 other public universities to cross the billion-dollar fundraising mark and one of only two organizations in the Pacific Northwest to reach the $1 billion campaign milestone. The Campaign for OSU concluded on December 31, 2014, with more than $1.1 billion from 106,000 donors.

The OSU Foundation and the OSU Alumni Association were integrated in 2017 to coordinate fundraising activities and alumni engagement in service to the university.

On October 14, 2022, the OSU Foundation, new university president Jayathi Murthy and leaders publicly launched Oregon State’s second university-wide fundraising and engagement campaign, Believe It: The Campaign for Oregon State University. Since this campaign began in 2017, donors have committed more than $1 billion to support university priority initiatives toward the $1.75 billion goal.

On May 18, 2023, members of the university community celebrated the OSU Foundation’s 75th anniversary. Among the historical highlights shared (figures as of June 30, 2022, unless otherwise noted):

- It took 60 years, from 1947 until 2007, for the OSU Foundation to receive its first $1 billion in philanthropic commitments. It then took nine years for donors to give the second $1 billion. Six years later, donors surpassed the $3 billion milestone in cumulative philanthropic commitments.
- The OSU Foundation has more than 2,600 distinct endowment funds, which support university people and programs. Of those funds, more than 1,500 are scholarship and fellowship funds, and more than 4,300 students benefit from these funds. OSU donors have created 181 endowed faculty position funds.
- The OSU Foundation has raised philanthropic funds for over 36 university facilities in Corvallis, Bend and Newport, Oregon.
- As of May 2023, more than 500 donor households and organizations have qualified for membership in the Harris Society, which recognizes those who have cumulatively given more than $1 million in support of the university.
