= Sportsman Park =

Ballpark in Greenville, Mississippi

Coordinates: 33.375750°N 91.035070°W

Sportsman Park was a ballpark located in Greenville, Mississippi, United States. It was home to the Greenville Bucks, Greenville Buckshots and Greenville Tigers, all minor league baseball teams, from 1947 to 1955. Considered the "seat of semipro baseball in the Delta," Sportsman Park also featured competitions including Major and Negro league players, as well the House of David baseball team.
