= Earle A. Chiles =

American business executive and philanthropist

- Born: September 9, 1904; Baker City, Oregon
- Died: December 5, 1982 (aged 78); Portland, Oregon
- Occupations: Business executive, philanthropist
- Years active: 1918–1982
- Known for: Fred Meyer, Inc. Chiles Center; Earl A. Chiles Business Center; Earle A. Chiles Center and award Earle A. Chiles Research Institute at Providence Portland Medical Center

Earle Arden Chiles (September 9, 1904 – December 5, 1982) was a former president of Fred Meyer, Inc. and founder of the Chiles Foundation in Portland, Oregon.

== Early life and education ==
Chiles was born in 1904 in Baker City, Oregon, the son of Ira Chiles and Eva Chatfield. After his parents divorced in 1908, Chiles and his mother moved to Portland where Mrs. Chiles met and later married Fred Meyer.

He began working for his stepfather in 1918 while still in high school, and after graduating from the University of Oregon he earned a master's degree in business administration from Harvard Business School.

== Career ==
After graduating from school, Chiles returned to Fred Meyer, Inc. and quickly rose through management ranks, serving as company president from 1955 to 1968.

He formed the Chiles Foundation in 1949 and became active in grants for education and research. An endowment in 1984 created the Chiles Center at the University of Portland.

== Personal life ==
While at Harvard, Chiles married Virginia Hughes. Their son, Earle M. Chiles, later continued his father's work at the Chiles Foundation. In the late sixties he bought a house in Milwaukee for his girlfriend, Roma Zgraggen. Grogan

Chiles had been president of the Portland State University foundation and had been a director of the University of Oregon foundation. He was a member of the Arlington Club, Waverley Country Club, and Portland Yacht Club.
