= Fred G. Meyer =

American businessman (1886–1978)

- Born: Fritz Grubmeyer; February 21, 1886; Germany
- Died: September 2, 1978 (aged 92); Portland, Oregon, U.S.
- Resting place: Ashes scattered from a bridge over the Sandy River near Wemme
- Occupation: Entrepreneur
- Spouse: Eva Chatfield Chiles
- Children: Earle A. Chiles (stepson)

Fred G. Meyer (February 21, 1886 – September 2, 1978) was an American businessman who founded the Oregon-based Fred Meyer store chain, which had 63 stores in four western states at the time of his death. He was known for successfully introducing several innovative marketing concepts. He is credited for inventing the modern hypermarket.

== Early life ==
Born Fritz Grubmeyer in Germany in 1886, (Note: Some sources say or imply that Meyer was born in Brooklyn. However, Leeson notes that Meyer gave his name as "Fred Henry Grubmeyer" and his birthplace as "Germany" on his Selective Service registration in 1918. He was a naturalized citizen "because his father had become a U.S. citizen before Fred Grubmeyer reached maturity.") Meyer came to the United States with his parents and older brother, William, in 1889. The family settled in Brooklyn, New York City, where Meyer completed his education up to the fifth grade and later worked in his father's grocery store.

== Career ==
Leaving home at the age of 19, he traveled through the American West, prospecting for gold near Nome, Alaska. Relocating to Seattle in 1906, Meyer worked for a small grocery and the Grand Union Tea Company until 1909, when he moved to Portland, Oregon.

In 1910, Meyer's brother William and his family moved to Portland. William and Fred managed the Mission Tea Company, which rented a stall at the City Public Market. Thereafter, Fred established a separate business using horse-drawn wagons to deliver coffee, tea, and spices to Portland residents and groceries to nearby logging camps and farms. By 1911, Meyer was managing Mission Tea, and after a dispute with William, he acquired a new partner and renamed the business the Java Coffee Company. Sometime after arriving in Portland, Frederick Grubmeyer shortened his name to Fred G. Meyer; a 2001 Oregonian article said the change was made "for convenience and maybe to save money on signs".

In 1922, he joined forces with his brother Henry, who had also moved to Portland. Together over the next few years they incorporated four businesses, including Mybros Meat Market, Oregon Piggly Wiggly, Pioneer Market Company (which leased space to vendors), and Mybros Inc., all in downtown Portland. Differences of opinion between the brothers led to Henry's departure from the partnership, and over time, Meyer expanded Mybros into the Fred Meyer chain of supermarkets and department stores. A "self-service drugstore" that Meyer opened in 1928 in downtown Portland was considered the first of its kind in the nation.

Meyer introduced innovative marketing concepts; he is often credited as one of the originators of the "one-stop shopping" concept, when in 1931, he built the Hollywood Fred Meyer, his first full-block megastore on Northeast Sandy Boulevard at 42nd Avenue in Portland (now a Rite Aid since the store's relocation to Hollywood West in 1988).

Meyer's wife, Eva, died in 1960. Their marriage had lasted 40 years. Eva Meyer was also secretary-treasurer of Fred Meyer Inc. until her death. The couple had no children together, but Eva had one son from a previous marriage, Earle A. Chiles (namesake of the Chiles Center), who also worked as an officer of the company.

Meyer was opposed to zoning, specifically naming the model of Houston, Texas, as a successful example. He is considered a pioneer in roof parking in the attempt to dissipate traffic congestion and bring neighborhoods closer to his shopping centers. The entire roof of his 22,750 square-foot Hollywood store, for example, was covered with a car park. He continued to work regularly until his death, even after suffering a major stroke in 1972. In 1974, his company expanded into the savings and loan business with the establishment of Fred Meyer Savings & Loan, which had 29 locations (in Fred Meyer stores) by 1978. He was named Portland's "First Citizen" in 1976.

== Death ==
Meyer died on September 2, 1978, at the age of 92, at his Portland home. He died in his sleep, but had been dealing with chronic heart disease and breathing difficulties in his last few years. In its obituary, Portland's The Oregonian described Meyer as "the venerable merchant whose name and shopping-center empire have been linked for almost 70 years with the city's growth". Oregon Governor Bob Straub was quoted as saying, "Oregon has lost one of its great citizens."

== Philanthropy ==
Although known for living frugally, Meyer gave to many charities, in particular the Salvation Army, and became known for his philanthropy. Upon his death, his stock in Fred Meyer established the Meyer Memorial Trust, leaving behind $60 million to be used for "religious, charitable, scientific, literary or educational purposes." He was cremated, and his remains were scattered in the Salmon River near Wemme on Mount Hood.

The Meyer Memorial Trust is distinct from the Fred Meyer Fund, controlled by Kroger, which now owns Fred Meyer Stores.

== Works cited ==
- Leeson, Fred (2014). My-Te-Fine Merchant: Fred Meyer's Retail Revolution. Portland, Oregon: Irvington Press. ISBN 978-0-9960626-0-2.
