= Fifteenmile Creek (Columbia River tributary) =

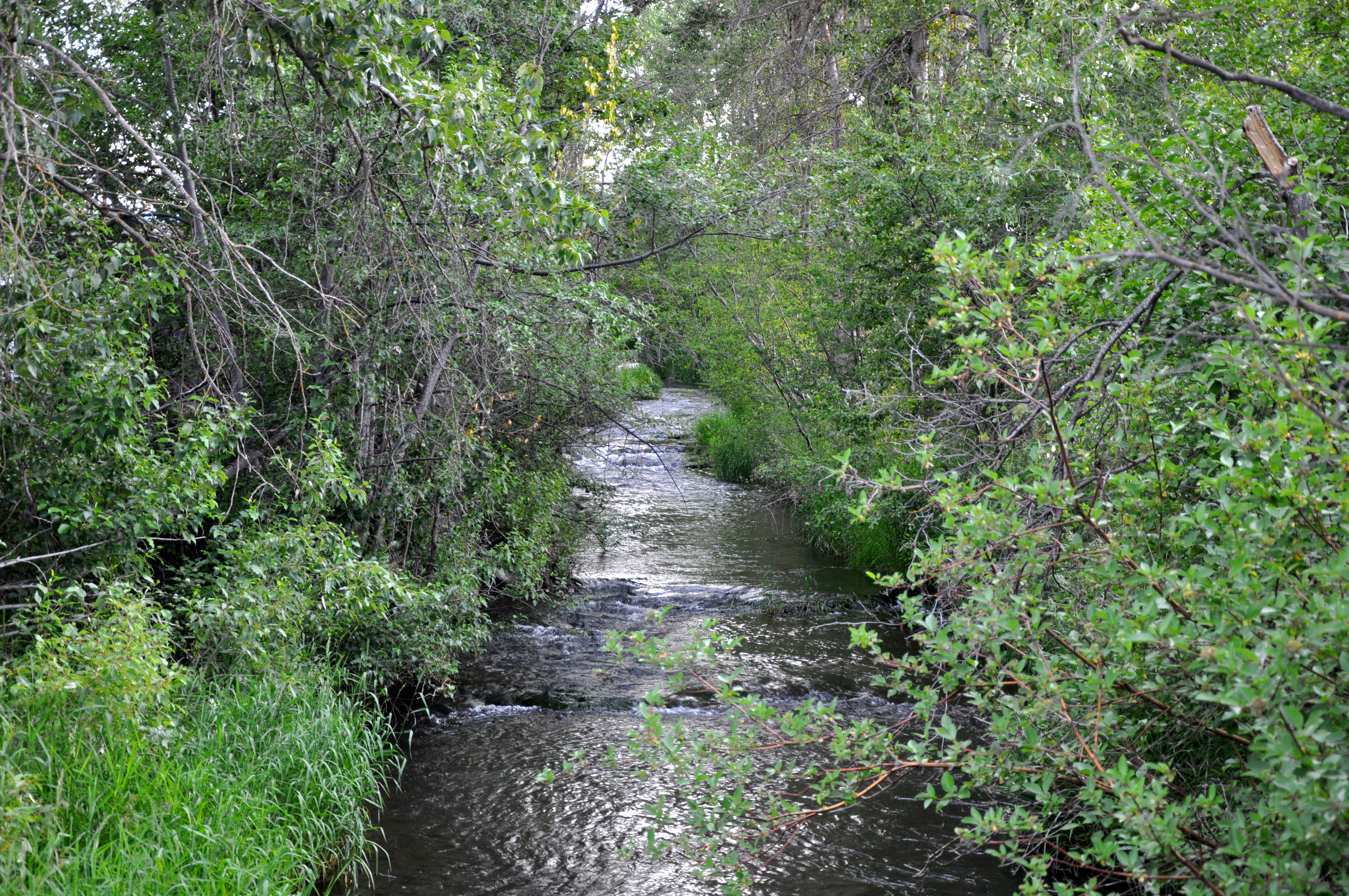
- Looking upstream from the North Main Street bridge in Dufur

- Location of the mouth of Fifteenmile Creek in Oregon

Location
- Country: United States
- State: Oregon
- Counties: Hood River and Wasco

Physical characteristics
- Source: Lookout Mountain
  - location: east of Mount Hood, Hood River County, Oregon
  - coordinates: 45°20′35″N 121°31′18″W
  - elevation: 6,178 ft (1,883 m)
- Mouth: Columbia River
  - location: near The Dalles, Wasco County, Oregon
  - coordinates: 45°36′50″N 121°07′22″W
  - elevation: 95 ft (29 m)
- Length: 54 mi (87 km)
- Basin size: 373 sq mi (970 km^{2})
- Discharge
  - location: mouth
  - average: 197 cu ft/s (5.6 m^{3}/s)

National Wild and Scenic Rivers System
- Type: Wild, Scenic
- Designated: March 30, 2009

Fifteenmile Creek is a 54-mile (87 km) long tributary of the Columbia River in the U.S. state of Oregon. It drains 373 square miles (966 km^{2}) of Hood River and Wasco counties. Arising in the Cascade Range near Mount Hood, it flows northeast then west to its confluence with the Columbia near The Dalles.

It was named "fifteenmile" because in pioneer days the main road crossed the creek about fifteen miles (24 km) from The Dalles.

== Course ==
Fifteenmile Creek's headwaters are near Lookout Mountain in the Cascade Range, east of Mount Hood. It flows northeast, crossing into Wasco County and gathering small tributaries such as Ramsey Creek and Pine Creek. Traveling through the city of Dufur, the creek is crossed by Highway 197. Fifteenmile Creek receives Dry Creek on the right downstream of Dufur, turning north. It then flows west, receiving Eightmile Creek on the left while paralleling the Columbia River. The creek is crossed by Interstate 84/Highway 30 just before its mouth. It flows into the Columbia approximately 191 miles (307 km) above its confluence with the Pacific Ocean.

== Watershed ==
Fifteenmile Creek drains 373 square miles (966 km^{2}) of the Columbia Plateau region of Oregon. Fifteen percent of the watershed is located in Mount Hood National Forest and therefore owned by the United States Forest Service, while the remaining eighty-five percent is privately owned. Elevations in the watershed range from 6,525 feet (1,989 m) at the summit of Lookout Mountain to 95 feet (29 m) at the creek's mouth.

== Fish ==
Several species of anadromous fish inhabit streams in the watershed, including steelhead, Pacific lamprey, chinook and coho salmon. Fifteenmile Creek is the easternmost tributary of the Columbia home to winter steelhead. Fifteenmile Creek coho salmon populations are within the Lower Columbia River Coho Evolutionary Significant Unit and are listed as threatened (2011). Populations have declined in recent years, due to a combination of overfishing, an increase of hydroelectric dams, and general worsening of habitat conditions.

== See also ==
- List of longest streams of Oregon
- List of rivers of Oregon
