= Mantra (actor) =

Indian actor, director and producer

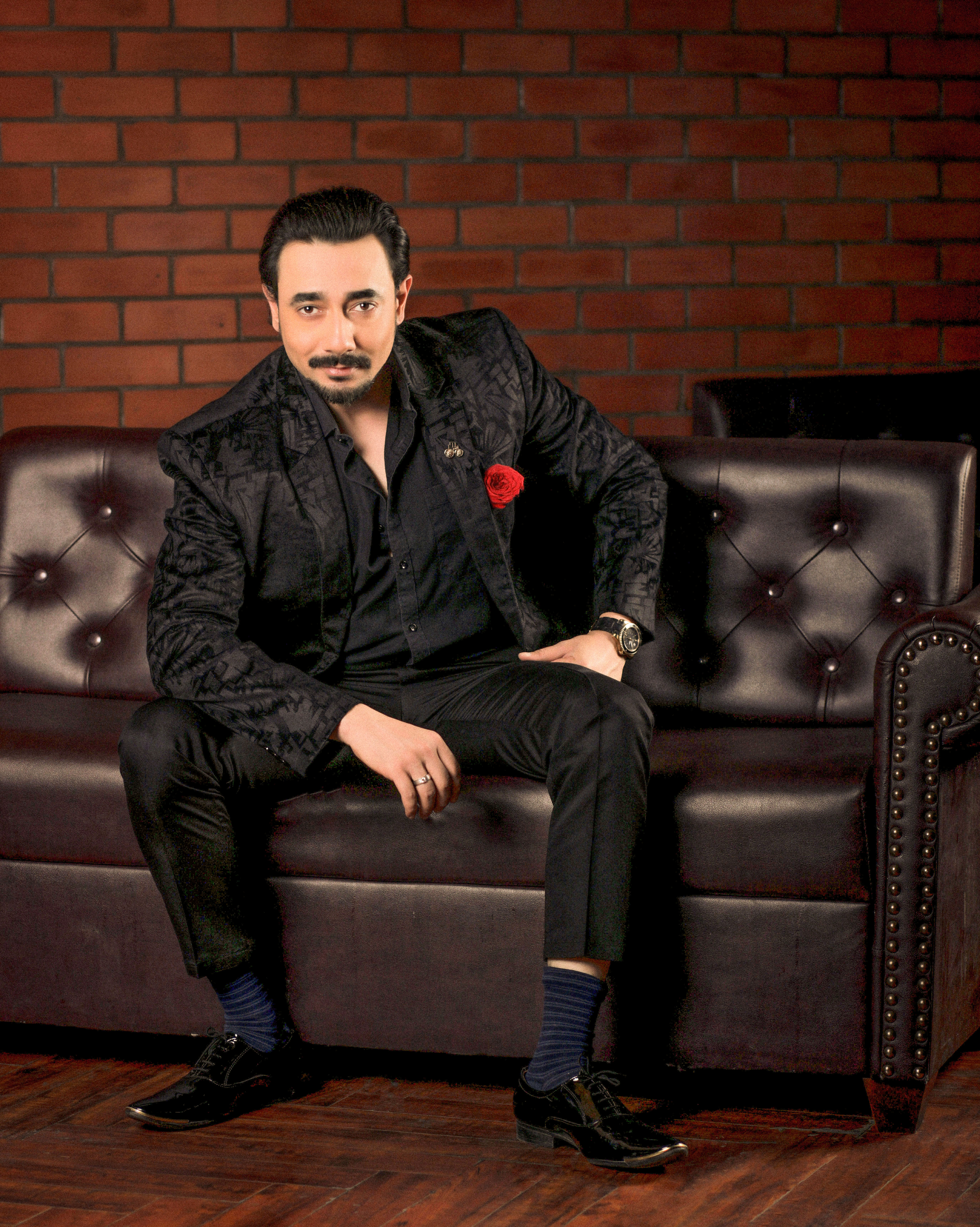
- Mantra
- Born: Indore, Madhya Pradesh, India
- Other names: RJ Mantra; VJ Mantra; Mantra Mugdh
- Occupations: TV host; film director; radio jockey; model; voice over artist
- Years active: 1998−2021
- Notable work: Aladdin; Comedy Circus; Narayan Narayan; Rebellious Flower
- Awards: 5
- Website: Official website

Puranjit Dasgupta, best known by his stage name Mantra, is an Indian actor, film director and producer, who started his career as a radio jockey. He is known for his portrayal of Bhaskar Bose in Spotify's detective thriller podcast Bhaskar Bose and Genie in Disney India's broadway-style musical Aladdin. He appeared in various Hindi films, notably Panipat (2019), High Jack (2018), Rebellious Flower (2016), London, Paris, New York (2012), Bheja Fry 2 (2011), Game (2011) and Tum Mile (2009). He is the founder of the Mumbai-based production company Mantramugdh Productions.

He gained a name as a host, anchoring for TV shows like India's Got Talent, Comedy Circus, and Zara Nachke Dikha, and also hosted the Pro Kabaddi League for the past seven seasons.

== Early life ==
He was born to Chandra Dasgupta, an actress who worked in Hindi cinema and Prabir Dasgupta, a book publisher.

== Career ==
=== Radio ===
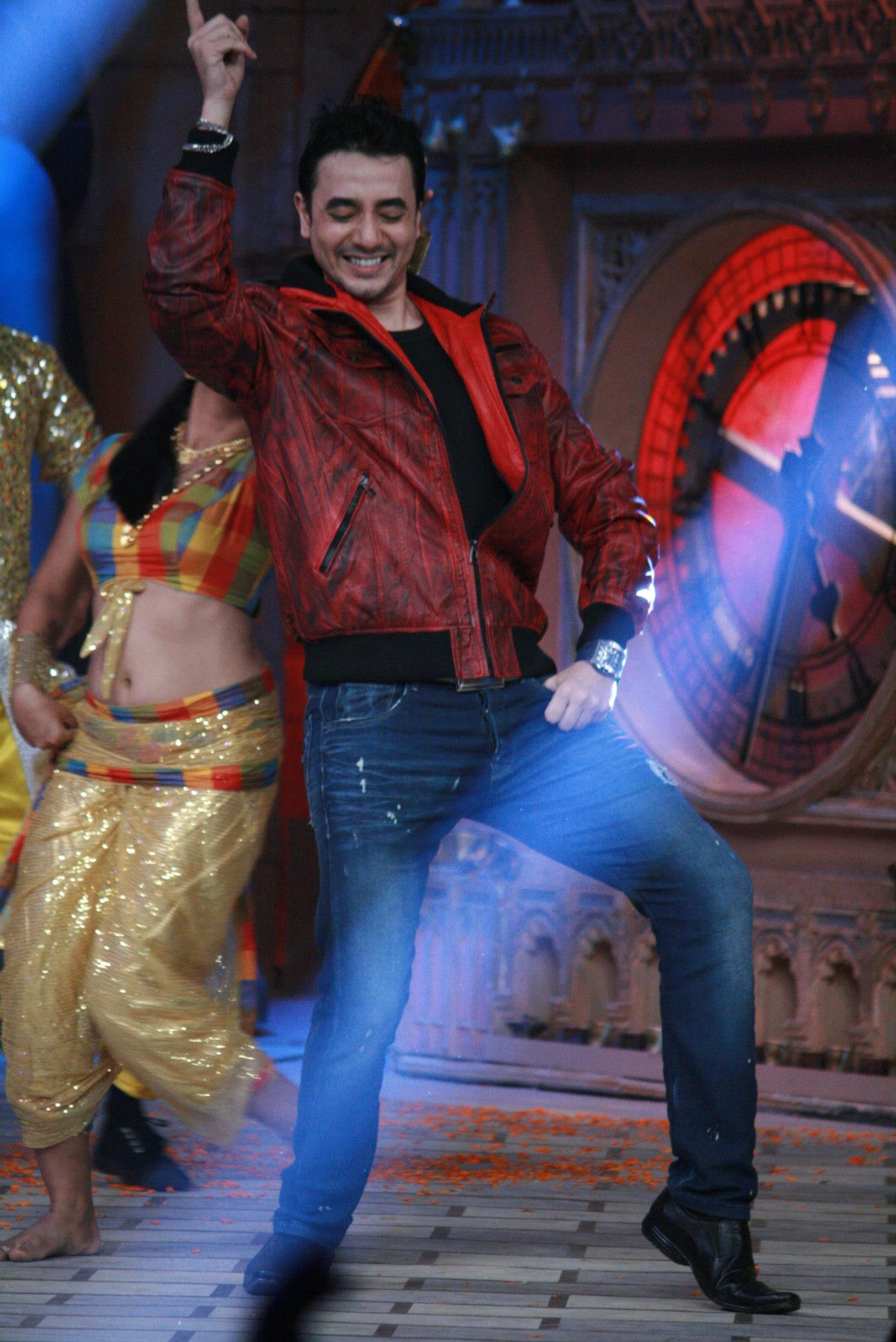
Mantra's opening act for Comedy Circus Ke Ajoobe

RJ Mantra started his career with Radio Mirchi, India's first private FM station in 2001. He moved to Delhi in 2003 and joined Radio City, where he hosted Route 91. He then moved on to work with Red FM 93.5, where he also hosted Radio show, Mumbai Local. He took a break from Radio in 2012. He returned to Radio in February 2017 with 92.7 Big FM's radio drama Lamhe With Mantra, a fiction-based show based on a particular theme of romance for each day.

=== Films ===
Mantra made his film debut as an actor with Vishesh Films' Tum Mile in 2009, where he appeared as the second lead Vicky. He went on to appear in Abhishek Bachchan starrer Game (2011), followed by Sagar Ballary's comedy film, Bheja Fry 2 (2011). He played the role of Nandu, a gangster in Hum Tum Shabana (2011) and a Paris-based sex toy shop owner in London, Paris, New York (2012).

In 2016's Rebellious Flower, a biopic of spiritual leader Osho Rajneesh, Mantra played the triple role of three spiritual guides who help Osho find enlightenment. The film was shot in real locations in rural Madhya Pradesh in Central India.

In 2018, he was seen in Akarsh Khurana's comedy film, High Jack, where he played a hijacker, Vinit. He portrayed the role of Najib ad-Dawlah in Ashutosh Gowariker's 2019 period film Panipat starring Sanjay Dutt, Arjun Kapoor and Kriti Sanon.

=== Television and web-series ===
His first major TV appearance was Lagegi on UTV's Bindass channel in 2007. The show was later renamed Hass ley India. In 2010, Mantra co-hosted dance reality show, Zara Nachke Dikha with Jennifer Winget on Star Plus. He played Doubting Dev in a show called Mystery Hunters India on Discovery Kids. As a stand-up comedian, he participated in successive Comedy Circus.

As a wild card entry, Mantra participated in the sixth season of the celebrity dance reality show Jhalak Dikhhla Jaa in June 2013. He was evicted from the show after two weeks. He co-hosted the reality TV series India's Got Talent with Bharti Singh in 2013–2014.

Mantra played the main lead in the mythological drama series Narayan Narayan, which aired on Big Magic. His performance as Narad was well received by the audience. He also worked as Video Jockey for Channel V and has hosted several television programs, including First Day First Show, G-spot. He hosted the Pro Kabaddi League, a professional-level Kabaddi league for the past seven seasons.

In 2015, he hosted Family Fortunes, an Indian TV game show based on the American game show Family Feud, which aired on Big Magic. He also appeared on Life OK's Har Mard Ka Dard in 2016.

In 2017, he appeared on Balaji Telefilms's web series Boygiri, available on ALTBalaji. In 2020, he appeared in three ZEE5 web series —the rom-com series Phone a Friend, the sci-fi thriller series Bhanwar, the thriller series The Casino. He also acted in MX Player's crime thriller series High and SonyLIV original series Shrikant Bashir.

=== Theatre ===
As a theatre artist, Mantra has performed in more than 100 plays of Piya Behrupiya, a Hindi interpretation of Shakespeare's Twelfth Night produced by Atul Kumar's The Company Theatre. He performed this two-hour musical drama first at the Globe Theatre in London as a part of the World Shakespeare Festival in May 2012, followed by the performances in Paris, Canada and the United States in 2016. In 2018, he was praised across India for his performance as Genie in Disney India's hit Broadway style musical Aladdin, which instantly became a crowd favourite.

He has done several plays, including Sohaila Kapur's Ouch, Divya Arora's The Melody of Love, Infinite Theatre's The Resistible Rise of Arturo Ui and Rajat Kapoor's Macbeth.

=== Audio series and podcasts ===
Mantra's MnM talkies is the audio wing of his production house MantraMugdh Productions. MnM Talkies specialises in audio dramas and has many shows varying from romance, drama, action, thriller to horror. Some of his shows include Kaali Awaazei, Love In The Time Of Corona, and Mine n Yours, Bhaskar Bose and Virus 2062.

He directed the detective thriller audio series Bhaskar Bose for the Spotify original, where he depicts the role of protagonist Bhaskar Bose. In 2020, Kaali Awaazein, a fictional 10-episode horror audio web series on Amazon's Audible Suno, was written and directed by Mantra, where Amitabh Bachchan gave his voice. Kaali Awaazein was presented by Amitabh Bachchan in January 2020.

In March 2021, Mantra directed a new Spotify Original podcast, I Hear You, a paranormal audio series featuring Aahana Kumra, who plays a Delhi based detective Priyamvada Parmar. He directed another Spotify original, Darr Ka Raaz with Dr. Phobia, a psychological horror starring Rajesh Khera and Riya Deepsi, released in April 2021.

MnM talkies produced Virus 2062, a Spotify India audio thriller voiced by Ali Fazal and Richa Chadha. It was directed by Mantra, which was released in September 2021.

=== Production and directions ===
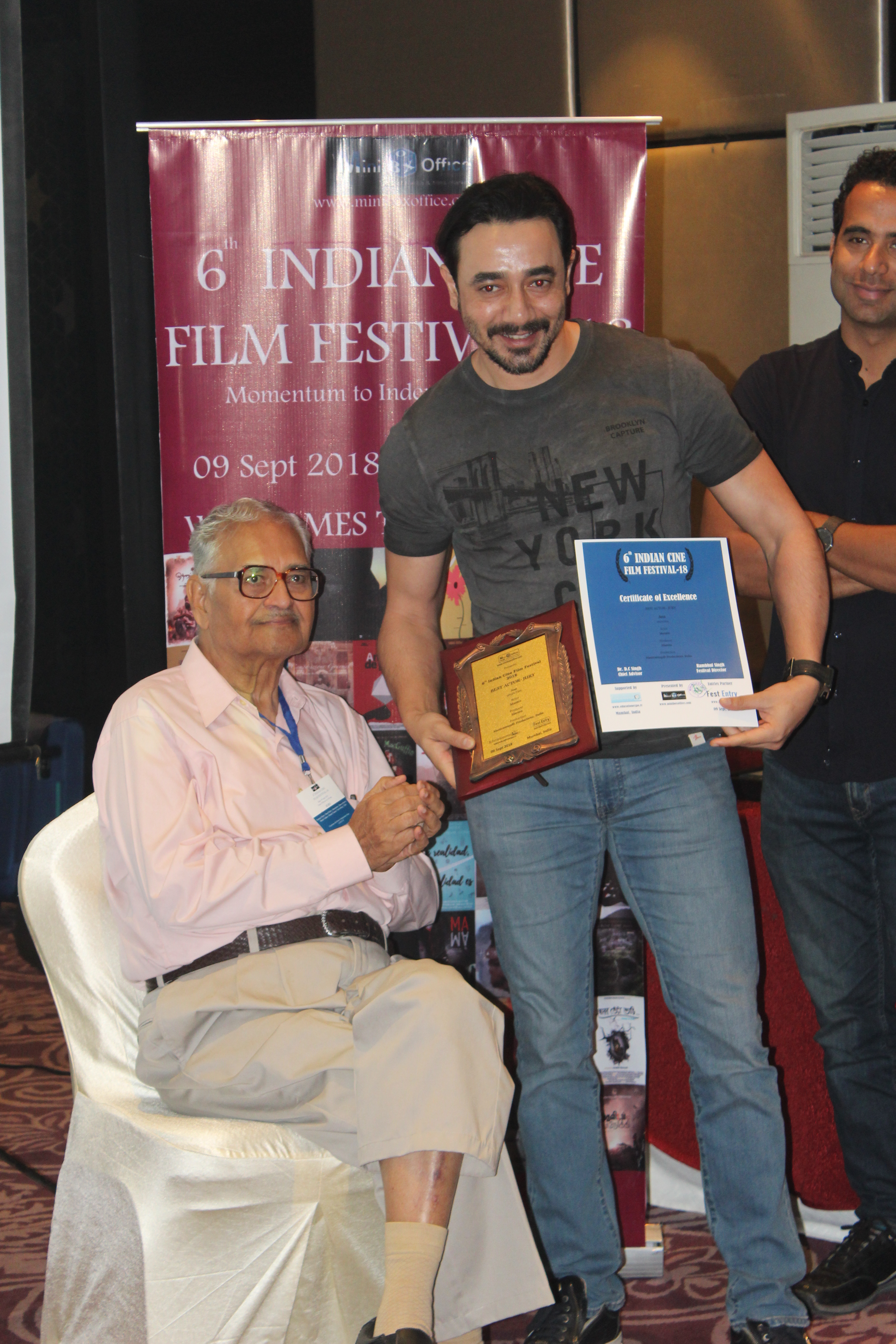
Mantra receiving the Best Actor award for Ana at the 6th Indian Cine Film Festival

Mantra has directed and produced various films and shorts films under the banner of his production company Mantramugdh Productions. In 2017, his short film, Khatara, which portrays the story of a simple small-town boy and his love for his car, won the Best Actor's Award at the 4th Bengaluru International Short Film Festival. Khatara was produced by Mantramugdh Productions in association with PitaraStudios and Purple Production.

Saudade, another short film produced by Mantra, won the Best Cinematography award at the 4th Bengaluru International Short Film Festival and was also selected in the Goa Short Film Festival and Bengaluru International Short Film Festival in 2019.

In 2016, Mantra produced and directed the short film, Deja Brew, featuring his mother. It was screened at the Filmingo International Short Film Festival, 5th Mumbai Short International Film Festival and 5th Delhi Short International Film Festival and Cineframe International Short Film Festival, Kolkata.

He made his debut in Bengali cinema with his first Bengali film Ana, was released on OTT platform ZEE5. Ana was nominated for the award of 'Best actor in a leading role' at the Moscow Indie Film Festival.

== Filmography ==
=== Feature films ===
Key
†	Denotes films that have not yet been released

Year	Film	Role	Notes
2009	Tum Mile	Vicky	Second lead
2011	Game	Ranbeer	
2011	Hum Tum Shabana	Nandu	
2011	Bheja Fry 2	Mantra	
2012	London, Paris, New York	Monty	
2016	Rebellious Flower	Masto Baba, Pagal Baba, Magga Baba	Biographical film of Rajneesh Osho
2018	High Jack	Vineet	
2019	Panipat	Najib ad-Dawlah	Epic war drama film
2021	Rashmi Rocket	Coach Tejas Mukherji	
2025	Fasco	Dr. Banerjee	Upcoming

=== Web-series ===
Year	Title	Role	Language	Notes
2017	Boygiri	Ravi Sinha	Hindi	ALTBalaji
2020	Phone-a-Friend	Leonardo	Hindi	ZEE5
2020	Bhanwar	Rodrigues	Hindi	ZEE5 original series
2020	High	DJ	Hindi	MX Player
2020	The Casino	Rinzin	Hindi	ZEE5 original series
2020	Shrikant Bashir	Parker	Hindi	SonyLIV original series

=== Television ===
Year	Title	Role	Channel	Notes
2007	Lagegi	Host	Bindass	
2008	First Day First Show	Video jockey	Channel V	
2008	G-Spot	Video jockey	Channel V	
2010	Zara Nachke Dikha	Co-host	Star Plus	Dance reality show
2011	Comedy Circus Ka Naya Daur	Contestant	Sony TV	
2012	Mystery Hunters India	Doubting Dev	Discovery Kids	
2013	Jhalak Dikhhla Jaa (Season 6)	Participant	Colors TV	Wild card entry
2013	India's Got Talent (Season 5)	Co-host	Colors TV	Hosted with Bharti Singh
2014	Bigg Boss (Season 8)	Guest	Colors TV	
2014	Pro Kabaddi League	Host	Star Sports	Hosted seven seasons
2015	Narayan Narayan	Narad	Big Magic	Main lead
2015	Family Fortune	Host	Big Magic	Based on Family Feud
2016	Har Mard Ka Dard	Himself	Life OK	
2018	Ace of Space 1	Host	MTV India	Finale episode

== Dubbing roles ==
=== Live action films ===
Title	Actor	Character	Dub language	Original language	Original release year	Dub release year	Notes
Bhaskar Bose	RJ Mantra	Bhaskar Bose	Hindi	Hindi	2020	2020	Spotify original
Aladdin	Will Smith	Genie	Hindi	English	2019	2019	
Toy Story 4	Jordan Peele	Bunny	English	Hindi	2019	2019	
Ralph Breaks the Internet	Bill Hader	J.P. Spamley	Hindi	English	2018	2018	

== Awards and recognition ==
Mantra is a two-time winner of the Promax Award for his show Mumbai Local on Red FM 93.5. He was given the RAPA Award for Best Radio Jockey twice. In June 2011, PETA gave him the "Hero to Animals" award for rescuing a parrot tangled in wires.

Mantra won the Best Actor award at the Bangalore Short Film Festival in 2015 for his short film Khatara and at the 6th Indian Cine Film Festival in 2018 for Ana. He was named the Best Radio Personality for the 92.7 Big FM show Lamhe with Mantra at The New York Festival Awards 2017.
