= Peepal Baba =

Indian environmentalist

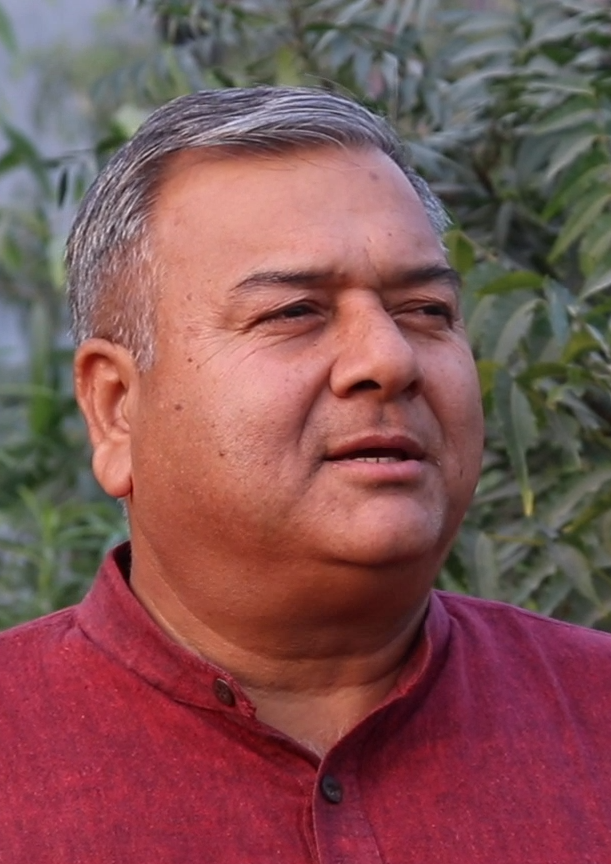
- Peepal Baba, in 2019.
- Born: Azad Jain; 26 January 1966 (age 60); Chandigarh
- Education: Masters in English Literature and Journalism
- Known for: Give Me Trees Trust
- Website: www.peepalbaba.org

Peepal Baba or Swami Prem Parivartan is an environmentalist who along with his team has planted over 20 million trees in 202 districts across 18 states in India. He was born to a doctor of Indian Army on 26 January 1966 in Chandigarh, India. His English teacher inspired him at the age of 11 to plant trees in 1977. He is the founder of Give Me Trees Trust which was later registered as a non-governmental organisation in 2011. He took asceticism in 1984 from Osho Rajneesh, who gave him the name "Swami Prem Parivartan". Now he also is an inspiration for others interested in the Nature.

== Early life ==
Peepal Baba was born on 26 January 1966 in Chandigarh, India as Azad Jain. His English teacher inspired him at the age of 11 to plant trees on Range Hills Road at Kirkee Military Station in 1977. He planted his first trees on 26 January 1977 in a hobby club in Pune. Since then he has been planting trees.

He completed his master's degrees in English literature and journalism. His father served as a doctor in the Indian Army.

== Career ==
He took asceticism in 1984 from Osho Rajneesh, who gave him the name "Swami Prem Parivartan". He founded the Give Me Trees Trust in 2010 after years of planting trees independently on his own. He later got it registered as a non-governmental organisation in 2011.

During the period of COVID pandemic, he and his team continued on their mission to plant trees following social distancing norms. Within a period of around 43 years, he and his team has managed to plant 20 million trees in 202 districts across 18 states of India.
