= Shunyo Park =

Zen garden in Pune, India

Shunyo Park or Shunyo Garden is a 12-acre (49,000 m^{2}) Zen garden in the Osho Ashram at Koregaon Park, Pune, India.
