= Teenage (2013 Indian film) =

- Directed by: Srikanth H R
- Produced by: Salt ‘N’ Pepper Entertainment
- Starring: Kishan Shrikanth; Priya Bharath Khanna; Tanvi Ganesh Lonkar; Apoorva Arora
- Cinematography: Makesh K. Dev
- Edited by: Kishan Shrikanth
- Music by: Siddharth Vipin
- Release date: 26 July 2013
- Country: India
- Language: Kannada

Teenage is a 2013 Indian Kannada-language film directed by Srikanth H R, starring Kishan Shrikanth, Priya Bharath Khanna, Tanvi Ganesh Lonkar and Apoorva Arora. The film released on 26 July 2013 along with Loosegalu.

== Cast ==
- Kishan Shrikanth as Arya
- Priya Bharath Khanna as Anjali
- Tanvi Ganesh Lonkar as Rosy
- Apoorva Arora as Preethi
- Giorgia Valenti
- Shrijit as Siri
- Raju Talikote
- Mansi Dhariwal
- Master Lakshman

== Production ==
The film was in the news for featuring a song with more than 15,000 kids from all over Karnataka. The delay of this film meant that director Srikanth HR went on to work on the dropped film Yenidu Manasali starring Vijay Raghavendra, Tanushree Dutta and Ishita Dutta in mid-2012.

== Music ==
Teenage

Soundtrack album by Siddharth Vipin
- Released: 2013
- Recorded: 2013
- Genre: Feature film soundtrack
- Length: 25:14
- Language: Kannada

Official audio
- Teenage - Full Album on YouTube

Track listing
No.	Title	Singer(s)	Length
1.	"Enidu Manasali"	Naresh Iyer, Vandana	4:01
2.	"Ondonde Kanasu"	Santhosh Venki	4:00
3.	"Hudugi Bekagide"	Naresh Iyer, Steve Watts	3:26
4.	"Banna Bannada"	Prasad, Sangeetha M R	2:48
5.	"Usirale Nanna"	Hariharan, Vandana	2:38
6.	"Manasalli Mosa Illa"	Dhyeya, Srikanth, Alvin	3:42
7.	"Idu Preethinaa"	Vandana, Aravind	2:39
8.	"Teenage Ee Thara"	Haricharan	3:20
Total length:			25:14

== Reception ==
=== Critical response ===
A Sharadhaa from The New Indian Express wrote "Among the nine songs in the film, the only song that is worth a watch is the one shot underwater. Otherwise, the movie is a soulless, repetitive drama, portrayed by dim-witted young boys and girls. The Verdict: If you want to enjoy the memories of your teenage years". B. S. Srivani from Deccan Herald wrote "Kishan, however, shines in editing, displaying a cool professional hand. Makesh and Rahul’s underwater cinematography is a treat to watch; even above water is just fine except when the camera seems to be unnecessarily restless, but that’s teen angst for you! Mass Mada’s action choreography doesn’t go overboard. Obvious drawbacks: too many songs to pay attention to and the director’s very loud background score". A critic from The Times of India scored the film at 3.5 out of 5 stars and wrote "After Care of Footpath, Kishan looks matured in acting and impresses as a teenager. Slumdog Millionaire fame Tanvi, Apoorva and Priya are lively. Music director Siddarth Vipin has come out with some foot-tapping energetic numbers. Cinematography by Magesh Dev is excellent". A critic from Bangalore Mirror wrote "Teenage is in a genre that is hardly touched in our films. However, this is the age group that forms a huge bulk of the film audience. Teenage shows how film makers could cater to this segment in times to come. The film is worth a visit to the theatre for its colourful imagery and freshness of intentions".
