= Bhanwar (2020 TV series) =

Indian web series

- Promotional Poster
- Written by: Deepak Pachory
- Directed by: Karanvir Bohra
- Starring: Karanvir Bohra; Teejay Sidhu; Priya Banerjee; Mantra; Payal Sodhi
- Music by: Arijit Datta
- Country of origin: India
- Original language: Hindi
- No. of seasons: 1
- No. of episodes: 8

Production
- Producer: Teejay Sidhu
- Cinematography: Raju Gauli
- Running time: 80-100 mins

Original release
- Network: ZEE5

Bhanwar is a sci-fi thriller series starring Karanvir Bohra, Priya Banerjee, Teejay Sidhu, Payal Sodhi and Mantra in key roles. The web series marks the directional debut of TV actor, Karanvir Bohra. Its about a couple who moves into a new apartment and discovers that the place is already occupied by their own ghosts, it also focuses on the theme of time travel. The web series was released on 18 August 2020 on ZEE5 OTT platform.

== Premise ==
The plot revolves around the lives of a husband and wife who move in to a new house where they encounter mysterious incidents. However, they soon learn that their new house is occupied by their own ghosts. Things get complicated when they realize that they have time travelled six months in future and that they were killed by the estate agent, who is a serial killer.

== Cast ==
- Karanvir Bohra as Ranvir Makhija
- Teejay Sidhu as Samantha Phoenix
- Priya Banerjee as Kanika Makhija
- Mantra as Rodrigues
- Payal Sodhi as Jo

== Release ==
The trailer was released on 13 August 2020 while the web series premiered on ZEE5 on 18 August 2020.

== Reception ==
Shefali Jha from IBTimes termed the series as a suspenseful ride and discussed further on the plot.
