= Tanvi Ganesh Lonkar =

Indian actress (born 1995)

- Born: 5 March 1995 (age 31); Mumbai, India
- Occupation: Actress

Tanvi Ganesh Lonkar (born 5 March 1995) is an Indian actress best known for her 2008 best movie role as the teenage version of "Latika", a character in the Academy Award-winning film Slumdog Millionaire. As a member of the cast of that film, Tanvi Ganesh Lonkar is a recipient of the 15th Screen Actors Guild Award for "Outstanding Performance by a Cast in a Motion Picture".

== Background ==
Lonkar was born in Mumbai, Maharashtra, India to Ganesh and Sharmila, and has a younger sister Janhavi. She speaks Marathi, Hindi and English fluently. She used to live in Goregaon West, she studied in Vibgyor High School, Mumbai. Her mother Sharmila works as a technician in Hinduja Hospital while her father Ganesh works with the Union Bank of India. She lived in Milledgeville GA, to attend Georgia College & State University and graduated with a Bachelor of Science in psychology.

== Career ==
Lonkar was chosen for the role as the teenage Latika when her uncle, an acquaintance of Slumdog Millionaire co-director Loveleen Tandan, encouraged her to go for the audition; unfortunately, the scene for which she was auditioning was cut out of the film. However, when her uncle informed the director of Tanvi's ability in relation to Indian classical dance, Tandan suggested that she audition for the role of the teenage Latika. She subsequently appeared in the award-winning Slumdog Millionaire (2008) and as a member of the cast, Tanvi Ganesh Lonkar is a recipient of the 15th Screen Actors Guild Award for "Outstanding Performance by a Cast in a Motion Picture".

She then worked on regional Indian films, appearing in the Kannada film Teenage and signing on to star in the low budget Tamil film, Kadhal Theevu in 2012. The Tamil film did not release, but she signed on to work on another project Vidayutham in 2013. The film was released on 18 March 2016. She also had a Hindi film, Last Benchers (2014).

== Filmography ==
Year	Film	Role	Language
2008	Slumdog Millionaire	teenage Lathika	Hindi
2013	Teenage	Rosy	Kannada
2014	Last Benchers		Hindi
2016	Vidayutham	Devathai	Tamil
