= Ujjwal Rana =

Indian actor and producer

- Born: 1 January 1970 (age 56)
- Occupation: Actor
- Years active: 2001–present
- Spouse: Neelam Ghildiyal
- Children: 1

Ujjwal Rana is an Indian actor, producer, and film personality known for his roles in Saathiya, BHK Bhalla@Halla.Kom, and television shows such as Meher (2004), and Ghar Ek Sapnaa (2007).

== Career ==
Rana is a model-turned-actor who has appeared in various television commercials. He appeared in Sathiya, which was directed by Mani Ratnam. He was seen in shows like Meher (2004), in which he played the role of Zayed Khan, and Sawaare Sabke Sapne... Preeto (2011), in which he played the role of Bobby. He portrayed Samman in the series called Ghar Ek Sapnaa. He was later replaced in the show. He has also produced a series called Mrs. & Mr. Sharma Allahabadwale (2010).

== Filmography ==
=== Films ===
Year	Film	Role	Notes
2002	Saathiya	Raghu	
2016	BHK Bhalla@Halla.Kom	Pawan Bhalla	

=== Television ===
Year	Title	Role	Notes
2001–2002	Kabhii Sautan Kabhii Sahelii	Uday Kiran	
2002–2003	Kahi To Milenge		
2004–2006	Meher	Zayed Khan	
2007–2009	Ghar Ek Sapnaa	Samman Chaudhary	
2012	Savdhaan India	Varun (Episode 1278) / Ashwin Rudra (Episode 2039)	
2011–2012	Sawaare Sabke Sapne... Preeto	Bobby Singh	
2015	Narayan Narayan	Vishnu	
2021	Kuch Toh Hai: Naagin Ek Naye Rang Mein	Shashank Raheja	
2025–2026	Jhanak	Abhimanyu Chatterjee	

As Producer

- Mrs. & Mr. Sharma Allahabadwale (2010)
