= Mystery Hunters India =

- Created by: Myleeta Aga Williams
- Starring: Apoorva Arora; Himanshu Sharma; Mantra
- Country of origin: India

Production
- Running time: 20 minutes

Original release
- Network: Discovery Kids (India)
- Release: 22 December 2012 – 2014

Mystery Hunters India is an Indian documentary television series aimed at a young audience. This investigative show aired on Discovery Kids (Asia). This series was developed by Myleene Aga Williams and Canadian production house.

Teenage hosts Apoorva and Himanshu investigate Indian mysteries.

== Characters ==
=== Doubting Dev ===
Doubting Dev, played by actor and stand-up comedian Mantra is the "residential sceptical scientist" in this show.

=== Apoorva and Himanshu ===
Apoorva Arora (born 1996) and Himanshu Sharma (born 1998) are the ones who go to a wide variety of locations all over India to investigate mysteries. They solved 24 mysteries. Apoorva helped in solving mystery of Talakad.

== See also ==
- Mystery Hunters
