= Vidayutham =

2016 Indian film by Nagamaneci

- Directed by: N. Nakamaneci
- Written by: N. Nakamaneci
- Produced by: R. N. Sreeja
- Starring: Tanvi Ganesh Lonkar; Ram Saravanan; N. Nakamaneci
- Cinematography: Gopal
- Edited by: Shebin Sebastian & Pradeep
- Music by: Mithun Eshwar
- Production company: Sree Nagaraja Sarpayashi Films Pvt Ltd
- Distributed by: Sree Nagaraja Sarpayashi Films Pvt Ltd
- Release date: 18 March 2016
- Running time: 138 mins
- Country: India
- Language: Tamil

Vidayutham is a 2016 Indian Tamil film directed by Nagamaneci. The film stars Tanvi Ganesh Lonkar, Kaushik Ram and Nagamaneci in the lead roles. This film is produced by Sree Nagaraja Sarpayaakshi Films and Nagamaneci Entertainments Private Ltd. The film was theatrically released on 18 March 2016.

== Plot ==
The film unfolds through a journey, tracing the consequences of two people meeting. Devathai, who is the daughter of the ex-minister Chitravel, comes across her first love Kaushik at her grandmother's funeral. She starts to learn more about Kaushik. Meanwhile, her elder sister Nithya develops a relationship with Prakash,the son of her father's rival Paddi Alandhan. A special investigating officer Nagaraj is sent to investigate a series of murders and he gradually realizes that there is no man behind them, but the power of an undetectable demonic force or ghost that led to these gruesome murders.

While getting deeper into the investigation, Nagaraj gets to know the reasons why the ghost is doing this and from where it appeared. Trying to find a solution to this, he discovers the Nagraja temple in Nagarcoil. In the temple, there is a five-headed snake, and the substance that comes from the snake is the "prasadam" for the temple. This prasadam is so powerful that if anyone applies it on their forehead no evil spirit or ghost will touch or come near them.Using the power of the temple, he is able to destroy the demonic ghost, thus succeeding making it flee.

== Cast ==
- Nakamaneci as Nagaraj
- Tanvi Ganesh Lonkar as Devathai
- Ram Saravana as Kaushik
- Kadhal Dhandapani as Paddi Alandhan
- Vettri as Prakash
- J. K. Adithya
- Chidambara Marthandan
- Swapna Banerjee as Nithya
- Shreya
- Kamali
- Deepa
- Malini Sathappan

== Production ==
The film initially began production in 2012 under the title Kadhal Theevu with director Vetriveeran and the film was reported to be a romantic thriller. Ram Saravana aka Ram Charan, who had earlier worked as a child actor in Thangar Bachan's Azhagi (2002) in the song "Damakku Damakku" was selected to play the lead role. Through a common friend, the makers signed on actress Tanvi Ganesh Lonkar, who had earlier appeared in the English film Slumdog Millionaire (2008), to play the female lead role. Tanvi signed the film citing her interest in using the Tamil film industry as a platform to break into bigger films in Bollywood, citing the examples of actresses Asin and Genelia D'Souza. Tanvi learned Tamil to shoot her scenes. The actress's inclusion in the film was widely covered by the media. Before N. Nakamaneci took over as director, Manoj Bharathiraja was cast as the antagonist.

== Soundtrack ==
Vidayutham

Soundtrack album to Vidayutham by Mithun Eshwar
- Released: 27 November 2015
- Genre: Feature film soundtrack
- Language: Tamil
- Label: Naga B Music

Tracklist
No.	Title	Lyrics	Singer(s)	Length
1.	"Whatsapp il Neeum"	Nagamaneci	Mithun Eshwar, Saptaparna Chakraborty	5:00
2.	"Alli Poo"	Nagamaneci	Sooraj Santhosh, Sraswathy, Roshni Roopesh, Latha Krishna	5:02
3.	"Engaio"	Nagamaneci	Karthik, Shweta Mohan	5:02
4.	"Cinna Cinna Aasai"	Nagamaneci	Nagamaneci, Roshine.I.S.	3:45
5.	"Aaeram Aaeram"	Nagamaneci	Velmurugan, Jassie Gift, Nagamaneci, Sunil Kumar	4:25
6.	"Ottai Sollai"	Nagamaneci	Latha Krishna	4:00
7.	"Whatsapp il Neeum (Male Solo)"	Nagamaneci	Mithun Eshwar	5:00

== Reception ==
The film had a theatrical release across Tamil Nadu on 18 March 2016. A critic from Maalai Malar called the film a waste of time. A review from the newspaper Thinnai gave the film a negative review and criticised the film's screenplay.
