= Apoorva Arora =

Indian actress and model

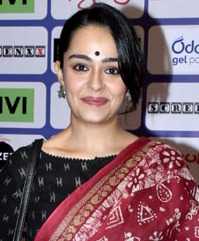
- Arora in 2023
- Born: 5 June, 1996; Delhi, India
- Occupations: Actress, dancer, model
- Years active: 2011–present

Apoorva Arora is an Indian actress and model who appears in Hindi, Gujarati, Punjabi and Kannada films. She has also appeared in various web series and music videos.

== Career ==
She stars in Hindi, Kannada, Punjabi and Gujarati films.

She entered Kannada films through the movie Siddhartha which starred Vinay Rajkumar in a lead role, which was her debut movie. Many people who saw the movie mistook her to be daughter of famous Telugu actress Amala Akkineni.

The first time she got a role in the film was at the age of 12 years. She went on to star in various ad campaigns and became a household face, especially after her Glam up and Cadbury perk ads. Currently, Apoorva is one of the most sought-after faces. In 2012, she assumed the role of explorer in Discovery Kids' documentary television series, named Mystery Hunters India. She is also a part of YouTube channel FilterCopy. Her video, Every School Romance, starring alongside Rohan Shah had 7.5 million views in 5 days on YouTube. She also starred in a College Romance web series alongside Gagan Arora. She has also acted in YouTube web series titled Wrong Number, with the character name of Khushi.

== Filmography ==
=== Films ===
Year	Title	Role	Language	Notes	Ref.
2011	Bubble Gum	Jenny	Hindi		
2012	OMG – Oh My God!	Jigna Mehta	Hindi		
2013	Teenage	Preethi	Kannada		
2014	Disco Singh	Priya	Punjabi		
2014	Dekh Tamasha Dekh	Shabbo	Hindi		
2014	Holiday: A Soldier Is Never Off Duty	Pinkie Bakshi	Hindi		
2014	Sathiyo Chalyo Khodaldham	Ami Patel/ Bijli	Gujarati		
2015	Sex Is Life	Alexa	English		
2015	Siddhartha	Khushi	Kannada		
2017	Manjha	Maaya	Marathi		
2017	Mugulu Nage	Charulatha	Kannada		
2018	Turning Point	Unknown	Hindi		
2019	Pranaam	Soha	Hindi		
2019	Behind The Trees	Apoorva	English		
2020	Yahan Sabhi Gyani Hain	Goldie	Hindi		
2020	Home Stories	Jia	Hindi		
2021	The Coldest Revenge	Meera Kapadia	Hindi	Short film	
2022	Badboli Bhavna	Bhavna	Hindi	Short film	
2022	Lost and Found in Singapore	Sitara	Hindi		
2022	Rani Pink	Ananya	Hindi	Short film	
2025	Aachari Baa	Dhanashree	Hindi	JioHotstar film	

=== Web series ===
Year	Title	Role	Notes	Ref.
2012-2014	Mystery Hunters India	Apoorva	Television series	
2018	Gangstars	Keerthi	Telugu series	
2018	FilterCopy Talkies	Aditi	Mini-series	
2018-2023	College Romance	Naira	4 seasons	
2019-2020	Wrong Number	Khushi	2 seasons	
2020	Firsts	Apoorva	Mini-series	
2020	Basement Company	Simran Ahuja		
2020	Butterflies	Niki	Episode 2	
2020	The Glitch	Maya		
2021	Dude	Ritu Kapoor		
2021	Khatta Meetha	Urvi Sharma		
2022	Udan Patolas	Puneet "Punni" Chandok	Mini-series	
2024	Family Aaj Kal	Meher		

=== Music videos ===
Year	Title	Singer(s)	Ref.
2019	Ajnabee	Bhuvan Bam	
2021	Sun Baliye	Sonu Kakkar, Gajendra Verma	
2021	Dooriyan	Raghav Chaitanya	
