= Dynamic meditation =

Meditation with physical actions

Dynamic meditation is a form of meditation in which physical actions are involved. The term appeared in the early 1970s when Osho's descriptions of his "Rajneesh Dhyan Yoga," developed at meditation camps in the Indian mountains, were translated into English. His prototypical method is still named "Dynamic Meditation."

The term has come into more general use to describe any approach to meditation that includes movement: examples are Sama and Haḍra among the Sufi mystics, the Gurdjieff movements, in the Dynamic Body Awareness (Conscience corporelle dynamique or Consapevolezza corporea dinamica) created in France by artist and anthropologist Martino Nicoletti and other sacred dances, Qigong and the many exercises developed in Buddhism and Taoism, in India those found in Yoga and Tantra, and the Latihan of Subud.

== History ==
Many cultures have traditions of meditative movement. Japan has Katsugen undō (regenerating movement exercise, 活元運動, かつげんうんどう), a Seitai exercise developed by Haruchika Noguchi in which one lets go of conscious control of the body and allows it to heal itself. In China, there is also Zifagong, Re-do and Zi Ran Qigong.

In Iran and Turkey there is Mevlevi Dervish or Sufi whirling which originally was spontaneous and impromptu. The origin of Sama is credited to Jalāl ad-Dīn Muhammad Rūmī (Persian: جلال‌الدین محمد رومی), Sufi master and founder of the Mevlevi Order. The story is that Rumi was walking through the town marketplace one day when he heard the rhythmic hammering of the goldbeaters. It is believed that Rumi heard the dhikr, "la ilaha ilallah" or in English, "no god but Allah" in the apprentices beating of the gold, and was so entranced in bliss he stretched out both of his arms and started spinning in a circle. With that, the practice of Sama and the dervishes of the Mevlevi order were born.

== Practice ==
Osho believed that cathartic methods were necessary since it was difficult for modern people to sit and enter meditation; "I never tell people to begin with just sitting. With a mad dance, you begin to be aware of a silent point within you; sitting silently, you begin to be aware of madness." His "dialectical" methods alternate activity and passivity, adapting elements of mantra and pranayama, latihan, kirtan and psychotherapeutic catharsis.

== Description of five stages ==
Osho Dynamic Meditation is described as a vigorous and profound exercise to break past ingrained patterns, allowing one to experience freedom, silence, and peace. Designed for early morning, it encourages intense engagement with the self through a specific sequence of movements and sounds over five stages, lasting an hour. This practice emphasizes continuous alertness and witnessing oneself, even during intense physical activity.

1. Intense Breathing: Begin with fast, deep, chaotic breaths through the nose, focusing on exhalation to energise the body and break old patterns. Focus on breathing out; the body will take care of the breathing in.
2. Release and Express: Engage in complete emotional release, using movement and sound to express and liberate stored emotions. Throw all the junk stored in the mind over years of suppressed emotions.
3. Energetic Jumping: Jump with raised arms, shouting a mantra "Hoo, Hoo, Hoo" to direct the impact on the sex centre, just below the navel. The universal energy will rise through all 7 Chakras.
4. Utter Stillness: On the word "Stop!" freeze completely, in any position, to internalize the energy flow and witness the inner state.
5. Celebration and Integration: End with a phase of dance and movement, integrating and carrying forward the meditation's energy.

== See also ==
- Shinshin-tōitsu-dō
