= Secrets of Love (TV series) =

- Release Poster
- Story by: Vishal Chhadwa
- Directed by: Ritesh S Kumar
- Starring: Ravi Kishan, Viivek Annand, Heramba Shankar Tripathi
- Music by: Ashish Donald
- Country of origin: India
- Original language: Hindi

Production
- Producer: Velji Gala
- Cinematography: Badal Mani
- Editor: Anand A Singh
- Production company: Premal Kranti films

Original release
- Network: MX Player
- Release: 6 March 2023

Secrets of Love is a 2023 Indian streaming television series streaming on MX Player, which was directed by Ritesh S Kumar and produced by Velji Gala. It is inspired by the events of Osho's life, starring Ravi Kishan as Osho, with Vivek Anand Mishra (young Osho) and Jayesh Kapoor as supporting actors. It was released on MX Player on 6 March 2023.

== Premise ==
The series is based on events during the life of Osho.

== Cast ==
- Ravi Kishan as Osho
- Vivek Anand Mishra as Young Osho
- Jayesh Kapoor

== Episodes ==
It contains 6 episodes.

== Production ==
Filming completed in mid-February 2021.

== Reception ==
Archika Khurana, writing for The Times of India, found the series was, "an honest attempt that tells a much lesser-known story of a mystic guru, but more conviction and stronger writing, could have propelled this drama to new heights".
