= Osho Monsoon Festival =

International festival of music and meditation held in Pune, India

OSHO Monsoon Festival
- Genre: Music, Meditation, Food
- Dates: 11–15 August
- Locations: Pune, India
- Years active: 2010–present
- Attendance: 2500
- Website: www.osho.com

Osho Monsoon meditation and music festival, popularly known as Osho Monsoon festival, is an international festival of music and meditation held in Pune, India. It is organised by Osho International Meditation Resort, a facility for followers of Osho (a spiritual leader more widely known as Bhagwan Shree Rajneesh). It is a 5-day annual event starting from 11 August till 15 August.

The festival hosts variety of Osho Meditations and International food festival throughout the day. During the night the Meditation Resort is filled with musical events. A total of approximately 71 different events are organised during the festival with participation of 2,500 participants across 152 cities and 17 states of India.

== Performances ==
The 5-day festival has most prominent musicians of India and abroad performing in the events throughout the day.

=== 2013 festival ===
- Flute renditions by Bikramjit Singh
- Odissi performance by Asha Nambiar

=== 2015 festival ===
- Sufi and Odissi dance performance by Zia Nath and troupe
- Ojas Adhiya's band Samarpan performs
- Fusion band by Ravi aiyyar and Sanyass Celebration.
- Poetry recital by popular Indian poet, lyricist, musician, composer and film director Gulzar, performance by Vishal Bhardwaj and Rekha Bhardwaj.
- Meditators Got talent.

=== 2018 festival ===
- Festival kickstarted with performances by flautist Bikramjit Singh and Mahesh Vinayakram(son of Grammy Award winner Vikku Vinayakram) with Aparna Gandhi, a renowned Odissi dancer with Varda Vaishampayan & Priyasha Deochake.
- Indian idol Season 4 participant Bhavya Pandit performed on 12 August.
- 13 August, a silent sitting with Milind Date and his band Fusion Ensemble and Mumbai-based band Aankh Micholi performed
- Violinist Avinash Jagtap performed during a silent sitting meditation.
- Rekha Bhardwaj and Vishal Bhardwaj also performed at the festival, and performance by Urja, led by sitarist Chintan Katti.
- Meditators got talent

=== 2022 festival ===
After two years of pause the festival was held again in 2022. Total 71 different programs were held during the festival. Programs included Tai chi, Chi Gong, Active Meditation and Live music.

- Hindi poets Surendra Sharma, Ambar Kharbanda, Varun Grover and Ashkaran Atal with Bollywood Director and Composer Vishal Bharadwaj performed on 12 August.
- Manipur-based flautist Bikramjit Singh and his band performed on the third day at the event Celebrating "Neo Sanyass"
- Playback singer Rekha Bharadwaj, with her band Azizon ki toli also performed at the festival.
- Meditators got talent.
