= Mrs. & Mr. Sharma Allahabadwale =

- Written by: Rajat Vyas; Nitin Keswwani
- Directed by: Ashish Khurana
- Starring: Divyanka T Dahiya; Rajesh Kumar; Vandana Pathak
- Music by: Abhijeet Hegdepatil
- Country of origin: India
- Original language: Hindi
- No. of seasons: 2
- No. of episodes: 148

Production
- Producers: Sunil Bindrani; Ujjwal Rana
- Running time: 22 Minutes
- Production company: Starex Entertainment

Original release
- Network: SAB TV
- Release: 17 May 2010 – 27 January 2011

Mrs. & Mr. Sharma Allahabadwale is an Indian television series which was aired on SAB TV from 17 May 2010 to 27 January 2011. The show shares the comic spirit and journey of a small town family with the struggle of a middle-class family.

== Premise ==
The show is based mainly on the two characters in the title, who live in Allahabad. Dristhdumn Sarveshwar Sharma is the head of the family. He is a simple man, content with his family and job. He is grounded with his own set of beliefs and customs. Mr. Sharma accepts a transfer letter with a prospect of a better future, and goes to Mumbai. Rashmi Sharma is a stereotypical, small city, middle-class Indian housewife. She has never seen a big city and has complete faith in her husband.

The show follows the day-to-day incidents in the life of a middle-class family, and shows the clash of values and ethics between people from small towns and large cities, represented by Allahabad and the vastly larger Mumbai. It also takes a humorous view of the widespread corruption and double standards of big city life.

== Cast ==
- Divyanka Tripathi played the character of Rashmi Dristhdumn Sharma, a perfect housewife who loves cooking for her husband, and feels her husband is the most honest person in the world.
- Rajesh Kumar played the character of Dristhdumn Sarveshwar Sharma, a 35-year-old married man ingrained with all the values of a true Indian. He has a master's degree in Hindi literature, and works as an assistant bank manager. He is overjoyed when he hears about his transfer from Allahabad to Mumbai, but does not know much about the reality of life in the city.
- Vandana Pathak as Rajshri Shah
- Akruti Singh played the character of Raagini Sharma, the 19-year-old sister of Mr. Sharma. He always encourages her to become an actress one day.
- Pooja Sharma played the character of Kiran, sister of Mrs. Sharma.
- Dilip Kumar Sharma played Daboo, the 11-year-old son of Mr. Sharma. He is smart, well managed and expert in handling situations.
- Ashiesh Roy as Anna
- Shruti Vyas as Dolly, Anna's wife
- Sudha Chandran and Atul Srivastava are leading characters.
- Anang Desai as Sharma Boss
- Gaurav Chopra as Plumber
- Aanjjan Srivastav as Mr. Sharma
