= Family Aaj Kal =

- Promotional release poster
- Genre: Comedy; Drama
- Written by: Manoj Kalwani; Arundhati Bhande
- Directed by: Parikshit Joshi
- Starring: Apoorva Arora; Sonali Sachdev; Nitesh Pandey; Aakarshan Singh; Masood Akhtar; Prakhar Singh
- Country of origin: India
- Original language: Hindi
- No. of episodes: 5

Production
- Producer: Anushka Shah
- Production location: Delhi
- Cinematography: Abhijeet Chaudhari
- Editor: Pulkit Verma
- Camera setup: Multi-camera
- Running time: 21-27 mins
- Production company: Civic Studios

Original release
- Network: SonyLIV
- Release: 3 April 2024

Family Aaj Kal (transl. Family Nowadays) is an Indian Hindi-language comedy drama television series directed by Parikshit Joshi and written by Manoj Kalwani and Arundhati Bhande. Produced by Anushka Shah under Civic Studios, it stars Apoorva Arora, Sonali Sachdev, Nitesh Pandey, Aakarshan Singh, Prakhar Singh, and Masood Akhtar. The series premiered on SonyLIV on 3 April 2024.

== Cast ==
- Apoorva Arora
- Sonali Sachdev
- Nitesh Pandey
- Aakarshan Singh
- Prakhar Singh
- Masood Akhtar

== Production ==
The series was announced by Civic Studios. The principal photography of the series was wrapped in 2023.

== Reception ==
Prateek Sur of Outlook India gave the series a rating of 3/5 stars. Shaheen Irani of OTTplay rated the series 3.5 out of 5 stars.
