= Rebellious Flower =

- Theatrical release poster
- Directed by: Krishan Hooda
- Written by: Jagdish Bharti
- Based on: Early life of Osho
- Produced by: Jagdish Bharti
- Starring: Prince Shah; Shashank Singh; Mantra; Indal Singh
- Cinematography: Neeraj Tiwari
- Edited by: Ganesh Sapkal
- Music by: Amano Manish
- Release date: 15 January 2016
- Running time: 110 minutes
- Country: India
- Language: Hindi

Rebellious Flower is a 2016 Hindi-language biographical film directed by Krishan Hooda. The directorial debut, written and produced by Jagdish Bharti, is based on the early years of Rajneesh Osho. The film won the Special Mention Jury Award at the 12th Salento International Film Festival, Italy. This is the first biopic on the early life of Osho Rajneesh, and the Osho Foundation supports it. The film was released on 15 January 2016.

== Plot ==
The life of spiritual guru Rajneesh Osho inspires Rebellious Flower. The plot is based on several incidents from his childhood and young life. Child Raja embarks on a journey within himself to understand the universal truth. He meets three mentors - Magga baba, Pagal baba, and Masto baba, who guide him through his journey and help him find the true essence of being

== Cast ==
- Prince Shah – Child Raja
- Shashank Singh – Young Raja
- Mantra - Magga Baba, Pagal Baba and Masto Baba
- Kirti Adarkar - Nani
- Bachchan Pachera - Nana
- Indal Singh - Baba
- Shaneel Sinha - Librarian Vidya Sagar

== Awards and accolades ==
- Winner Inspirational Feature - Cinema World Fest Awards 2017, Ontario, Canada
- Winner Best Original Score - Fimucinema 2017, Canary Islands, Spain
- Winner Best Director Jury Award - Salento International Film Festival, 2015 Italy
- Winner Best Debutant Director - LCIFF - Lake City International Film Festival 2015, India
- Finalist - Rishikesh Art and Film Festival, India
- Finalist - ISFFI - International Spiritual Film Festival
- Semi Finalist - SIFF - Southeastern International Film Festival, Georgia, USA
- Semi Finalist - California International Film Festival and Davis Chinese Film Festival, California, USA
- Official Selection - Nisville Movie Summit 2017, Serbia
- Official Selection - Grand Indiewise Convention 2017, Miami, Florida, USA
- Official Selection - Lumiere Cinemavvenire Film Festival 2015, Rome, Italy
- Official Selection - 10th Tel Aviv Spirit Film Festival, Israel
- Official Selection - Wiper Film Festival 2015, New York, USA
