= Bhaskar Bose =

Indian Thriller podcast series

- Genre: Thriller
- Language: Hindi

Creative team
- Created by: MnM Talkies
- Written by: Asif Syed, Obaidur Rahman
- Directed by: Mantra Mugdh

Cast and voices
- Voices: Mantra Mugdh, Shadaab Hashmi

Production
- Production: MnM Talkies; Spotify (Till 2023 - Season 2)
- Length: 12-20 minutes

Publication
- No. of seasons: 2
- No. of episodes: 378
- Original release: 2 December 2019
- Provider: Spotify

Reception
- Cited for: Golden Mikes Award 2022 New York Festival Radio Awards 2023

Related
- Website: open.spotify.com/show/4BuXlpcana6xU2ctfZ3qgZ

Bhaskar Bose is an Indian fiction podcast show starring Mantra Mugdh as Bhaskar Bose and Shadaab Hashmi as Bikesh Das. It was the only fiction show to debut on Spotify India's podcast platform in 2019.

== Presentation Team ==
- Directed by Mantra Mugdh
- Written by Asif Syed, Obaidur Rahman
- Produced By Spotify (Till 2023 - Season 2), MnM Talkies
- Distributed By Spotify

== Voice cast ==
- Mantra Mugdh as Bhaskar Bose.
- Shadaab Hashmi as Bikesh Das.

== Production ==
The show debuted in 2019 as part of Spotify India’s podcast platform. Its first two seasons were produced jointly by Spotify and MnM Talkies and comprised a total of 105 cases.

Following the broadcast of its final episode in 2023, the series remained inactive for three years. It subsequently returned with a third season, produced without Spotify's involvement. Although the season continued to be distributed on Spotify, the rights to Bhaskar Bose reverted exclusively to MnM Talkies, rather than remaining jointly held by Spotify and MnM Talkies.

== Reception ==
In 2022, Bhasker Bose won Golden Mikes Awards, and in 2023, won New York Festivals Radio Award.
