= BHK Bhalla@Halla.Kom =

- Theatrical release poster
- Directed by: Rakesh Chaurvedi Om
- Produced by: Dhiraj Rokad, Amit Rokad, Ashok Tripathi, Rakesh Chaturvedi ‘Om'
- Starring: Ujjwal Rana; Inshika Bedi; Manoj Pahwa; Seema Pahwa; Yashpal Sharma; Brijendra Kala; Benjamin Gilani
- Music by: Rahul Mishra
- Release date: February 5, 2016
- Country: India
- Language: Hindi

BHK Bhalla@Halla.Kom is a 2016 Indian Hindi-language comedy film directed by Rakesh Chaturvedi Om, featuring songs by Rahul Mishra. The film was released on 5 February 2016 and stars Ujjwal Rana and Inshika Bedi in the lead roles.

In the film, Chaturvedi has commented that he drew upon his own life experiences as inspiration for the movie, as he had several of his marriage proposals rejected because he did not own his own home.

== Synopsis ==
All Pawan Bhalla wants is to marry his love Pooja, however her father has given him one requirement: that he get a place of his own and do so within a month. Finding a suitable home proves to be difficult, as living spaces in Mumbai are expensive.

== Cast ==
- Ujjwal Rana as Pawan Bhalla
- Inshika Bedi as Pooja
- Raj Arjun as Gagan Dhalla

== Soundtrack and background score ==
Music and lyrics for the film were composed by Rahul Mishra.

- Aa Jaa Mahi Ve - Pavni Pandey
- Phalooda - Neeraj Joshi, Tochi Raina
- Soniye (Remix) - Rahul Mishra, Shivangi Bhayana
- Soniye - Revisited (Unplugged) - Rahul Mishra, Shivangi Bhayana

== Reception ==
The Times of India panned the film, as they felt that it was "far too content being plain and passable. Replete with amateur jokes, the writing is worse than that of laughter shows." The Free Press Journal also criticized BHK Bhalla@Halla.com, writing that it was "A threadbare situational comedy that tries hard to make it all look funny but fails miserably."

In contrast, actor Tom Alter praised the movie, which he felt was comparable to Jaane Bhi Do Yaaro. The Hans India was also more favorable, as they wrote that the movie "largely succeeds in narrating a good story in a light-hearted and funny manner."
