= Gangstars =

- Teaser poster
- Genre: Crime drama
- Created by: B. V. Nandini Reddy
- Written by: Lakshmi Bhupala (dialogues)
- Directed by: Ajay Bhuyan
- Starring: Jagapathi Babu; Navdeep; Shweta Basu Prasad; Siddhu Jonnalagadda; Apoorva Arora
- Composer: Sai Kartheek
- Country of origin: India
- Original language: Telugu
- No. of seasons: 1
- No. of episodes: 12

Production
- Producers: Swapna Dutt; Chakravathi Gutta; Sanjay Reddy
- Cinematography: Rakesh Erukulla
- Editor: Kishore Maddali
- Running time: 21–25 minutes
- Production companies: Amazon Studios; Early Monsoon Tales; Silly Monks Entertainment Ltd

Original release
- Network: Amazon Prime Video
- Release: 1 June 2018

Gangstars is a 2018 Indian Telugu-language crime drama television series by Amazon Prime Video, and produced by Swapna Dutt, Chakravathi Gutta, Sanjay Reddy, and Anil Pallala, under Early Monsoon Tales and Silly Monks Entertainments. It was directed by Ajay Bhuyan and created by B. V. Nandini Reddy. The series stars Jagapathi Babu, Navdeep, Shweta Basu Prasad, Siddhu Jonnalagadda, Apoorva Arora and music is composed by Sai Karthik.

It is the first ever Amazon Prime Video original series in Telugu, and has 12 episodes with dubbed versions in Tamil and Hindi.

== Plot ==
The series is set in the backdrop of the film industry and involves two movie stars, two ex-lovers, and one gangster. How one incident sets up a chain of events in motion and interconnects the lives of all these characters, interspersed with a murder is the intriguing crux of the narrative.

== Cast ==
=== Main ===
- Jagapathi Babu as Kumar Das "K.D.", a gangster who has been informed that he has cancer and is going to die
- Navdeep as Vishwa, an arrogant and controversial film hero.
- Shweta Basu Prasad as Aishwarya, a haughty film actress
- Siddhu Jonnalagadda as Ajay, who tries to become a film director. He is the manager of Aishwarya.
- Apoorva Arora as Keerthi, who tries to become a film producer, manager of Vishwa

=== Recurring ===
- Sivaji as C.I.Anjaneyulu, a corrupt police officer
- Posani Krishna Murali as Blockbuster Paala Subramanyam, a film producer who produces the movie for helping KD
- Thagubothu Ramesh as Rani Rajkamal, Aishwarya's make-up
- Krishna Bhagawan as P.K.R., Vishwa's father
- Rahul Ramakrishna as Red, K.D.'s brother-in-law
- RJ Hemanth as Vicky, Ajay's friend
- Radio Mirchi Kiran as Director of the film
- Ranam Venu as an ad film director
- Raja Ravindra as Ajay's father
- Dhanraj as a choreographer
- Ananth as a producer
- Rallapalli as astrologer
- Sanjay Reddy as a doctor
- Uttej as Gopal, ward boy in the hospital who has taken debt from K.D.
- Annapurna as Keerthi's grandmother
- Aishwarya as Priyamwada, Keerthi's mother
- Sri Lakshmi as Keerthi's aunt
- Hari Teja as Girija, K.D.'s wife
- Mounima as Jahnavi / Jaanu, a journalist
- Gayatri Gutta

== Reception ==
Haricharan Pudupeddi of the Firstpost called the series a "wasted opportunity". He added that "Despite having so much of talent at its disposal, the show fails to rise above a very predictable story of action and comedy." Hemanth Kumar CR writing for The News Minute stated that "Gangstars feels like a missed opportunity to create something unique and charming. It has its moments, when it takes a sly dig at the film industry, but when it focuses on its own story, it becomes too self-aware of what it wants to do and it never finds its groove."
