= Narayan Narayan =

- Directed by: Lucky Raajput
- Starring: Mantra; Ujjwal Rana
- Original language: Hindi
- No. of seasons: 1

Original release
- Network: Big Magic
- Release: 6 April 2015

Narayan Narayan — Chulbule Narad Ki Natkhat Leelaye is a mythological comedy television series that aired on BIG Magic, an Indian television station. It is centered on the humorous pursuits of the sage Narada.

== Plot summary ==
With the sage Narad and Vishnu as the central characters, the plot revolves around their mentor-devotee relationship with moral teachings that are summarized at the end of every episode. The Hindu Trinity (Trimurti) consisting of Brahma, Vishnu and Shiva and their consorts (Lakshmi, Saraswati and Parvati), are characters, as are Indra and Agni.

== Cast ==
- Mantra as Narada (Brahma's son and devotee of Vishnu
- Kirti Adarkar as Narad's mother
- Ujjwal Rana as Vishnu
- Raja Kapse as Brahma
- Vaibhav Saraswat as Shiva
- Surya Sev Malik as Agni Dev
- Deepali Saini as Lakshmi
- Jiya Chauhan as Parvati
- Shivkant Lakhanpal as Indra
- Praveen Srivastava as Varun Dev
- Avinash Verma as Samudra Dev
- Ram Awana as Shani
- Poorti Arya as Vrinda
