= Rajneesh (disambiguation) =

Rajneesh (1931–1990) was an Indian mystic and guru with an international following. Rajneesh or Rajnish may also refer to:

- Antelope, Oregon, a small town in Oregon that was renamed to "Rajneesh" in 1984 and then renamed back to "Antelope" in 1985
- Rajneeshpuram, a former intentional community established near Antelope, Oregon, by members of the Rajneesh movement
- Byron v. Rajneesh Foundation International, a 1985 lawsuit against the Rajneesh Foundation International
- Campbell Court Hotel, a historic hotel in Oregon that was bombed in 1983 while operating as Hotel Rajneesh
- Rajneesh movement, a new religious movement based on the teachings of Rajneesh
- Chandra or Rajnish and Rajnipati, a Hindu lunar deity

== People ==
- Rajneesh Dahiya, an Indian politician
- Rajneesh Duggal, an Indian model and actor
- Rajneesh Harvansh Singh, an Indian politician
- Rajneesh Narula, a British-Indian economist
- Rajneesh Chopra, an Indian former cricketer
- Rajneesh Gurbani, an Indian cricketer
- Rajneesh Harvansh Singh, an Indian politician
- Rajnish Khanna, an Indian-American photobiologist
- Rajnish Kumar (disambiguation)
  - Rajnish Kumar (banker), an Indian banker
  - Rajnish Kumar (peace activist), an Indian peace activist
  - Rajnish Kumar (politician), an Indian politician
- Rajnish Mehra, an Indian-American economist
- Rajneesh Mishra, an Indian cricketer
- Rajnish Mishra, an Indian film and music director
- Rajnish Rai, an Indian police officer and management professor, notable for investigating the death of Sohrabuddin Sheikh

== See also ==
- Osho (disambiguation), another name of the mystic
