= Ian Hughes =

Iain or Ian Hughes may refer to:

== Sportsmen ==
- Ian Hughes (Australian footballer) (1939–1976), player with North Melbourne in VFL
- Ian Hughes (footballer, born 1946), Welsh winger
- Ian Hughes (footballer, born 1961), English defender for Sunderland
- Ian Hughes (rugby league) (born 1972), English second-row at club level
- Ian Hughes (footballer, born 1974), Welsh defender

== Others ==
- Iain Hughes (born 1950), British circuit judge
- Ian Hughes (epredator) (born 1967), British technology evangelist and television personality

== See also ==
- Hughes (surname)
