= Rajnish Kumar =

Rajnish Kumar may refer to:

- Rajnish Kumar (banker), Indian banker
- Rajnish Kumar (chemical engineer), Indian chemical engineer
- Rajnish Kumar (politician), Indian politician
- Rajnish Kumar (peace activist) (born 1967)
- Rajnish Kumar Dahiya, Indian politician
- Rajnish Kumar Mittal, Indian politician
