= Mittal (surname) =

Mittal is a surname in India. Notable people with the surname include:

== Notable people ==
- Aditi Mittal (born 1985), Indian stand-up comedian
- Aditya Mittal (born 1974), Indian businessman
- Ajay Kumar Mittal (born 1958), former chief justice of Madhya Pradesh, Meghalaya, and Punjab/Haryana high courts
- Alok Mittal (born 1969), IPS officer and policeman
- Ankur Mittal (born 1992), Indian sport shooter
- Anoop Kumar Mittal (born 1960), Chairman and Managing Director of NBCC
- Anupam Mittal (1971), founder of Shaadi.com and Angel investor at Shark Tank India
- Ashok Mittal (born 1964), Indian businessman and politician
- Chhavi Mittal (born 1980), Indian actress
- Gita Mittal (born 1958), first female judge of the Jammu and Kashmir High Court
- Gopal Mittal (1906–1993), Indian poet, writer, critic and journalist
- Jagdish Mittal (1925–2025), Indian artist and art collector
- Kavin Bharti Mittal, Indian internet entrepreneur, son of Sunil Mittal
- Lakshmi Mittal (born 1950), Indian industrialist
- Lakshman Das Mittal, Indian industrialist, founder of Sonalika Group
- Madan Mohan Mittal (born 1939), Indian politician from Punjab
- Madhur Mittal (born 1988), Indian actor
- Mehar Mittal (1934–2016), Indian actor and film producer
- Neena Mittal, Indian politician
- Neeraj Mittal (born 1967), principal secretary of Tamil Nadu's Information Technology Department
- Pramod Mittal (born 1956), chairman of Ispat Industries Limited, younger brother of Lakshmi Mittal
- Pratham Mittal, Indian entrepreneur and educator, founder of Tetr College of Business
- Rajan Mittal (born 1960), Indian businessman, vice chairman and managing director of Bharti Enterprises
- Rajat Mittal (born 1967), researcher and medical engineering professor at Johns Hopkins University
- Rajnish Kumar Mittal (born 1974), president of Municipal Council Nabha
- Sanjay Mittal, Indian aerospace engineer
- Sat Paul Mittal (1931–1992), Indian politician, father of Sunil Mittal
- Satish Chandra Mittal (born 1938), retired Indian history professor
- Som Mittal, Indian businessman
- Sudhanshu Mittal, Indian politician
- Sunil Bharti Mittal (born 1957), founder of (telecom company) Bharti Airtel.
- Sumeet Hukamchand Mittal (born 1974) Indian screenwriter, producer, director and entrepreneur (founder of Shashi Sumeet Productions)
- Vinay Mittal (born 1953), Indian civil servant
