= Mittal =

Mittal may refer to

- Mittal (surname), an Indian surname
  - Lakshmi Mittal (born 1950), an Indian steel magnate
- Mittal Patel, an Indian activist
- Mittal Champions Trust, an Indian sports promotion trust established by Lakshmi Mittal
- Mittal Steel Company, an Indian steel company owned by Lakshmi Mittal, now a part of ArcelorMittal
  - Mittal Steel South Africa, its subsidiary
- 15434 Mittal, an asteroid

== See also ==
- Mittal v/s Mittal, a 2010 Indian film
