= My Life in Orange =

2004 memoir by Tim Guest

- Book cover
- Author: Tim Guest
- Language: English
- Subject: Rajneesh movement
- Genre: Non-fiction
- Publisher: Granta Books
- Publication date: 2004
- Publication place: United Kingdom
- Media type: Paperback
- Pages: 301
- ISBN: 0-15-603106-X
- OCLC: 55600890

My Life in Orange: Growing Up with the Guru is an account of a child growing up in the Rajneesh movement led by Bhagwan Shree Rajneesh. The book is a firsthand account, written by Tim Guest at the age of 27, years after his experiences. The book was published in 2004 by Granta Books. The book's title is a reference to the term "the orange people", which was used to refer to members of the Rajneesh movement due to the color they dyed their clothes.

Guest describes how his mother was initially raised in strict Catholicism, but later turned to a tape of Bhagwan Shree Rajneesh after going through a period of experimenting with sex and drugs. She dyed all of her clothes orange, took on the name of "Ma Prem Vismaya", and "Yogesh" for her son, and moved to a Rajneesh movement commune near Bombay. Guest's mother moved to many different communes, and had leadership roles within the movement, eventually running a commune in Suffolk. Guest recounts how he regretted the absence of his mother's presence during this time, and describes controversial living conditions with other children at the various ashrams. Guest and his mother moved to the 64,000-acre (260 km^{2}) commune in Oregon, but his mother was demoted in position and sent to live at a different commune in Cologne. His family later disassociated from the Rajneesh movement and moved back to North London, where they each encountered difficulties reintegrating back into mainstream society.

My Life in Orange received generally positive reviews, and was highlighted in a "Top 20 non-fiction" list by The Daily Telegraph, and a "50 Best Books for the Beach" by The Independent. Kirkus Reviews called the book "a rightly disturbing record of malignant child neglect by people who sought a heaven, but made a hell", and William Leith of New Statesman described it as "an excellent study of what happens when a charismatic leader comes into contact with a group of rudderless, dispirited people". Publishers Weekly called it "an absorbing book about survival and good intentions gone awry".

== Author ==
Tim Guest attended Sussex University where he studied psychology, and obtained a M.A. degree in creative writing from the University of East Anglia. Guest was a journalist for The Guardian and The Daily Telegraph. After the publication of My Life in Orange, Guest later wrote a book about the phenomenon of electronic virtual worlds and video games, titled Second Lives: A Journey Through Virtual Worlds, published in 2008 by Random House. On 31 July 2009, Guest died of a suspected heart attack at 34 years old. He was found dead by his wife Jo; despite her efforts to resuscitate him, she was unable to revive him. It was later determined that Guest had died of a morphine overdose.

== Contents ==
Tim Guest's mother Anne was born in 1950 into a Catholic family. She took courses in psychology at the University of Sheffield. His father was a psychologist on staff at the university. She gave birth to Tim Guest in 1975. Guest's mother fell in love with another man when Guest was six months old. She became a feminist, studied Ronald David Laing, and experimented with sex and drugs. Guest's mother became a follower of Bhagwan Shree Rajneesh when Guest was a toddler, after listening to a cassette tape of Rajneesh which displayed the cover text "Surrender to me, and I will transform you", and was titled: "Meditation: the art of ecstasy". Bhagwan Shree Rajneesh taught his followers his perspective on chaotic therapy, sexual freedom and mysticism. She brought her son into the movement in 1979. She was given the name of "Ma Prem Vismaya" (Sanskrit: Mother Love Wonder), and dyed all of her clothes orange.

In 1981, his mother took him to live on an ashram operated by Rajneesh in Poona, India. Guest was renamed as "Yogesh" by Rajneesh. As the Rajneesh movement grew in influence and became involved in controversy, Guest's mother became more involved in the movement. Guest was moved to various Rajneeshee communes, including London, Devon, India, Oregon and Germany. Guest was moved at times to communes and sent to live without his mother. Guest's mother was involved in running the commune and his father lived in the United States. He was raised by other members of the Rajneesh movement, and lived with other children in the ashrams.

His mother ran a commune called "Medina Rajneesh" in Suffolk, and Guest went to a school run on the commune where no history classes were given. Guest describes multiple rules he disliked which he had to observe while living on the Osho commune, including a restricted diet and mandated worship. His stuffed animals and books were taken away from him. He did not spend much time with his mother, because she was frequently working for the movement. When Rajneesh moved from India to Oregon, Guest and his mother moved to Oregon as well, and though Guest enjoyed roaming on the 64,000-acre (260 km^{2}) commune he still wished to spend time with his mother.

His mother was later demoted in leadership status by other members of the female leadership of the commune, and sent with Guest to a commune in Cologne. Guest had difficulty learning German, and spent time hiding behind a pile of mattresses with a book and playing with Lego. He describes his childhood in the Rajneesh movement as "somewhere in between Peter Pan and Lord of the Flies", and writes that he had 200 "mothers", but did not spend time with his own mother. According to Guest, group leaders in the Rajneesh movement often initiated fourteen and fifteen-year-old girls into sex. Guest and his mother left the movement when he was a teenager, and she burned all of her orange clothing. Guest himself left at first; he phoned his mother at age 10 to inform her he was leaving to live with his father in San Francisco.

When his mother left the group, Guest moved back with her to the United Kingdom. Guest, his mother and stepfather Martin moved to north London, and he began the process of experiencing adolescence in a society different from that inside the Rajneesh movement. Guest reentered society at age 11, and faced confusion over the contrast in experiences between his childhood in the Rajneesh movement and his new experiences as a teenager in London. He enrolled in the Haverstock School in north London, but had trouble during his teen years with drugs and alcohol. He had difficult relations with his stepfather, and had not spent much time with him prior to the move to London. Anne and Martin went through a period of time where they thought they were beings from a different world, and read books on UFOs. Guest fostered his interest in reading, and went on to study at university.

== Reception ==
My Life in Orange received generally positive reviews in book trade publications and in the media. The New Yorker critic John Lahr characterized My Life in Orange as "one of the best autobiographies of the decade". The Daily Telegraph placed the book in its "Top 20 non-fiction" list of "the year's best biographies, histories and memoirs" for 2004, and The Independent highlighted the book among its "50 Best Books for the Beach". A review in Reference & Research Book News commented that participants in the Rajneesh movement created "adults like Guest who are marked by the neglect suffered in a childhood among the completely self-absorbed". Kirkus Reviews described the book as "a rightly disturbing record of malignant child neglect by people who sought a heaven, but made a hell". My Life in Orange was highlighted among Kirkus Reviews "Best books for reading groups". In his review of the book for M2 Best Books, Peter Haswell concluded: "A thoroughly enjoyable read and a fascinating insight into the workings of a commune along with the people, their beliefs and their attitudes. Both amusing and sad. Pretty much something for everyone."

"Guest writes with a reporter's sense of economy and restraint, letting absurd, even shocking details speak for themselves."

— Booklist

The book received a favorable review in New Statesman, and William Leith wrote: "This is an excellent study of what happens when a charismatic leader comes into contact with a group of rudderless, dispirited people. They follow him blindly. They let him get away with anything." Montagu Curzon of The Spectator wrote that "Guest makes an astonishingly mature debut (he is 27) and has the rare ability to describe childhood as a small child lives it; accepting, helpless, curious." Lois Kendall gave the book a positive review in Cultic Studies Review, and wrote: "The book is deep, yet light and readable, both for those who have had similar life experiences and who, I am sure, will find solace in this book, and for those with no such personal experience, who will find the narrative fascinating." Publishers Weekly characterized My Life in Orange as "Honest and vivid, this is an absorbing book about survival and good intentions gone awry." Gillian Engberg of Booklist called the book a "stirring memoir", and wrote: "Guest writes with a reporter's sense of economy and restraint, letting absurd, even shocking details speak for themselves." Christopher Hart gave the book a positive review in The Sunday Times, and wrote: "Tim Guest’s extraordinary account of his childhood in the communes of Bhagwan, the notorious Indian guru, is a survivor’s tale, poignant, funny and wise."

A review in The Daily Telegraph commented that "the main failure of Guest's otherwise excellent book is the absence of character: even his mother comes across rather as a history than a personality." "My Life in Orange, though slightly patchwork in its construction, is an absorbing piece of writing, all the more compelling for begging as many questions as it answers and for the author's refusal to ask for pity," wrote Geraldine Bedell in a review of the book in The Observer. Director of the Cheltenham Festival of Literature, Christopher Cook, characterized My Life in Orange as "the most extraordinary account of his [Tim Guest's] childhood and the bravest writing I've read in ages". Sudipta Datta of the Indian Express described the book as "a postcard from the past that the Osho ashram may not rave about." Datta noted though that after having been angry with his mother and Rajneesh, Guest had reconciled with his family, reclaimed his childhood and come to see Rajneesh as "a loveable rogue who got away with doing his own thing". Catherine A. Powers of The Boston Globe characterized the book as a "moving, superbly written account of growing up in the midst of ... cruel madness". Michael E. Young of The Dallas Morning News gave the book a favorable review, and wrote: "The book offers a glimpse into the thoughts of the followers, and examines the fine line between spirituality and insanity, between religion and cult." Shane Hegarty of The Irish Times characterized the book as "an intriguing and often humorous mix of straightforward 1980s nostalgia and cult delusion".

== See also ==
- Breaking the Spell: My Life as a Rajneeshee and the Long Journey Back to Freedom (2009)
- Child neglect
