= Hunter Commission =

Hunter Commission may refer to:

- Commission on Indian Education, prepared in 1882 by William Wilson Hunter
- Hunter Commission, a 1919 investigation into the Jallianwala Bagh massacre, a British massacre that killed 1600 Indian civilians headed by William Hunter, Lord Hunter
