= Osho (disambiguation) =

Osho, also called Rajneesh (1931–1990), was an Indian mystic, guru and philosopher.

Osho may also refer to:

== Other people ==
- Andi Osho (born 1973), British comedian, actress and writer
- Gabriel Osho (born 1998), English professional footballer
- Josh Osho (born 1992), English singer-songwriter
- Pierre Osho (born 1945), former defense minister of Benin
- Set Osho (born 1986), Nigerian-born UK sprinter
- Eugenia Osho-Williams (born 1961), Sierra Leonean sprinter

== Other uses ==
- Oshō, a Japanese term used in various schools of Buddhism
- Ōshō (shogi), a title in Japanese professional shogi strategy board game competition
- Ōshō Station, a train station in Toyama, Japan
- Osho movement, an alternative name for the Rajneesh movement
  - Osho Monsoon Festival, an international festival of music and meditation for members of the Rajneesh movement

== See also ==
- Rajneesh (disambiguation)
