= Pratiksha =

- Pronunciation: Pra teak shaw
- Gender: Female
- Language: Sanskrit, Hindi, Nepali

Origin
- Origin: India
- Meaning: "waiting"
- Region of origin: India, Nepal

Other names
- Alternative spelling: Prateeksha, Pratikshya

Pratiksha (transl. awaiting; Nepali: प्रतीक्षा) is a female given name in Hindi and Nepali languages.

Notable people with the name include:

- Pratiksha Apurv, Indian painter
- Pratiksha Santosh Shinde, Indian athlete
- Pratiksha Jadhav, Indian film actress
- Prateeksha Lonkar, Indian Marathi film and television actress
