= William Wilson Hunter =

Scottish historian and statistician (1840-1900)

Sir William Wilson Hunter KCSI CIE
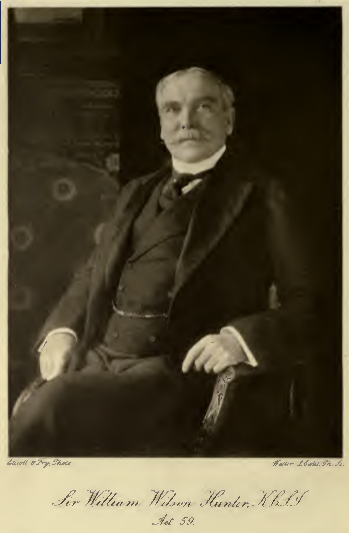
- Born: 15 July 1840; Glasgow, Scotland, UK
- Died: 6 February 1900 (aged 59); Oaken Holt, England, UK
- Education: University of Glasgow
- Scientific career
- Fields: History, statistics
- Workplaces: Indian Civil Service; University of Calcutta

Sir William Wilson Hunter KCSI CIE (15 July 1840 – 6 February 1900) was a Scottish historian, statistician, a compiler and a member of the Indian Civil Service.

He is most known for The Imperial Gazetteer of India on which he started working in 1869, and which was eventually published in nine volumes in 1881, then fourteen, and later as a twenty-six volume set after his death.

== Early life and education ==
William Wilson Hunter was born on 15 July 1840 in Glasgow, Scotland, to Andrew Galloway Hunter, a Glasgow manufacturer. He was the second of his father's three sons. In 1854 he started his education at the 'Quaker Seminary' at Queenswood, Hampshire, and a year later he joined The Glasgow Academy.

He was educated at the University of Glasgow (BA 1860), Paris and Bonn, acquiring a knowledge of Sanskrit, LL.D., before passing first in the final examination for the Indian Civil Service in 1862.

== Career ==
He reached Bengal Presidency in November 1862 and was appointed assistant magistrate and collector of Birbhum, in the lower provinces of Bengal, where he began collecting local traditions and records, which formed the materials for his publication, entitled The Annals of Rural Bengal, which influenced the historical romances of Bankim Chandra Chattopadhyay.

He also compiled A Comparative Dictionary of the Non-Aryan Languages of India, a glossary of dialects based mainly upon the collections of Brian Houghton Hodgson, which according to the Encyclopædia Britannica Eleventh Edition, "testifies to the industry of the writer but contains much immature philological speculation".

In 1869 Lord Mayo, the then governor-general, asked Hunter to submit a scheme for a comprehensive statistical survey of India. The work involved the compilation of a number of local gazetteers, in various stages of progress, and their consolidation in a condensed form upon a single and uniform plan. There was unhappiness with the scope and completeness of the earlier surveys conducted by administrators such as Buchanan, and Hunter determined to model his efforts on the Ain-i-Akbari and Description de l'Égypte. Hunter said that "It was my hope to make a memorial of England's work in India, more lasting, because truer and more complete, than these monuments of Mughal Empire and of French ambition."

In response to Mayo's question on 30 May 1871 of whether the Indian Muslims are "bound by their religion to rebel against the Queen" Hunter completed his influential work The Indian Musalmans in mid-June 1871 and later published it as a book in mid-August of the same year. In it, Hunter concluded that the majority of the Indian Muslim scholars rejected the idea of rebelling against the Government because of their opinion that the condition for religious war, i.e. the absence of protection and liberty between Muslims and infidel rulers, did not exist in British India; and that "there is no jihad in a country where protection is afforded".

In 1872 Hunter published his history of Orissa. The third International Sanitary Conference held at Constantinople in 1866 declared Hindu and Muslim pilgrimages to be 'the most powerful of all the causes which conduce to the development and propagation of Cholera epidemics'. Hunter echoing the view described the 'squalid pilgrim army of Jagannath' as

with its rags and hair and skin freighted with vermin and impregnated with infection, may any year slay thousands of the most talented and beautiful of our age in Vienna, London, or Washington.

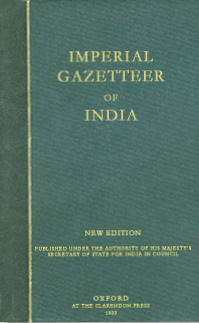
The Imperial Gazetteer of India, William Wilson Hunter's most known work, on which he started working in 1869.

He embarked on a series of tours throughout the country, and he supervised the A Statistical Account of Bengal (20 volumes, 1875–1877) and a similar work for Assam (2 volumes, 1879).

Hunter wrote that

Under this system, the materials for the whole of British India have now been collected, in several Provinces the work of compilation has rapidly advanced, and everywhere it is well in hand. During the same period the first Census of India has been taken, and furnished a vast accession to our knowledge of the people. The materials now amassed form a Statistical Survey of a continent with a population exceeding that of all Europe, Russia excepted."

The statistical accounts, covering the 240 administrative districts, comprised 128 volumes and these were condensed into the nine volumes of The Imperial Gazetteer of India, which was published in 1881. The Gazetteer was revised in later series, the second edition comprising 14 volumes published between 1885 and 1887, while the third comprised 26 volumes, including an atlas, and was published in 1908 under the editorship of Herbert Hope Risley, William Stevenson Meyer, Richard Burn and James Sutherland Cotton.

Again according to the Encyclopædia Britannica Eleventh Edition, Hunter "adopted a transliteration of vernacular place-names, by which means the correct pronunciation is ordinarily indicated; but hardly sufficient allowance was made for old spellings consecrated by history and long usage." Hunter's own article on India was published in 1880 as A Brief History of the Indian Peoples, and has been widely translated and utilized in Indian schools. A revised form was issued in 1895, under the title of The Indian Empire: its People, History and Products.

Hunter later said that

Nothing is more costly than ignorance. I believe that, in spite of its many defects, this work will provide a memorable episode in the long battle against ignorance; a breakwater against the tide of prejudice and false opinions flowing down upon us from the past, and the foundation for a truer and wider knowledge of India in time to come. Its aim has been not literary graces, nor scientific discovery, nor antiquarian research; but an earnest endeavour to render India better governed, because better understood.

Hunter contributed the articles "Bombay", "Calcutta", "Dacca", "Delhi" and "Mysore" to the 9th edition (1875–89) of the Encyclopædia Britannica.

In 1882 Hunter, as a member of the governor-general's council, presided over the Commission on Indian Education; in 1886 he was elected vice-chancellor of the University of Calcutta. In 1887 he retired from the service, was created KCSI, and settled at Oaken Holt, near Oxford. He was on the governing body of Abingdon School from 1895 until his death in 1900.

On 13 March 1889 Philip Lyttelton Gell the then Secretary to the Delegates of the Clarendon Press, wrote to Hunter about

a project which has been for some time under the consideration of the Delegates, to publish a series giving the salient features of Indian History in the Biographies of successive Generals and Administrators.

Gell arranged the publication of the series by June 1889; with Hunter receiving £75 for each volume, and the author £25. Gell's experience of the earlier unsaleable Sacred Books of the East and financial constraints forced the Rulers of India to end at 28 volumes in spite of Hunter's disappointment about the same. Hunter himself contributed the volumes on Dalhousie (1890) and Mayo (1891) to the series.

He had previously written an official Life of Lord Mayo, which was published on 19 November 1875 in two volumes with a second edition appearing in 1876. He also wrote a weekly article on Indian affairs for The Times. But the great task to which he applied himself on his settlement in England was a history upon a large scale of the British Dominion in India, two volumes of which only had appeared when he died, carrying the reader barely down to 1700. He was much hindered by the confused state of his materials, a portion of which he arranged and published in 1894 as Bengal Manuscript Records, in three volumes.

Hunter dedicated his 1892 work Bombay 1885 to 1890: A Study in Indian Administration to Florence Nightingale.

His later works include the novel titled The Old Missionary (1895, described on the title-page as "revised from The Contemporary Review"), and The Thackerays in India (1897). John F. Riddick describes Hunter's The Old Missionary as one of the "three significant works" produced by Anglo-Indian writers on Indian missionaries along with The Hosts of the Lord (1900) by Flora Annie Steel and Idolatry (1909) by Alice Perrin.

In the winter of 1898–1899, in consequence of the fatigue incurred in a journey to the Caspian and back, on a visit to the sick-bed of one of his two sons, Hunter was stricken down by a severe attack of influenza, which affected his heart. He died at Oaken Holt on 6 February 1900.

S. C. Mittal believes that Hunter "represented the official mind of the bureaucratic Victorian historians in India", of whom James Talboys Wheeler and Alfred Comyn Lyall were other examples.

== Bibliography ==
=== Works ===
- A Comparative Dictionary of the Languages of India and High Asia: With a Dissertation. Based on the Hodgson Lists, Official Records, and Mss. Trübner and Company. 1868.
- The Annals of Rural Bengal. Smith, Elder & Co. 1868.
- The Indian Musalmans: Are They Bound in Conscience to Rebel Against the Queen?. Trübner and Company. 1871.
- Orissa: Or the Vicissitudes of an Indian Province Under Native and British Rule. Smith, Elder and Company. 1872.
- A Statistical Account of Bengal. London: Trübner & Co. 1875–1879. (20 volumes)
- A Statistical Account of Assam. 1879. (2 volumes) vol. 1 vol. 2
- A Brief history of the Indian peoples. Oxford: Clarendon Press. 1880.
- The Imperial Gazetteer of India. 1908–1909. (3rd ed. 26 vols; 1st ed. 9 vols, 1881; 2nd ed. 14 vols, 1885–87)
- The Indian Empire: Its People, History, and Products London (Second ed.). Trübner & Co. 1886. ISBN 9788120615816.
- The Marquess of Dalhousie. 1890.
- Bombay, 1885-1890: A Study in Indian Administration. Frowde. 1892.
- State Education for the People in America, Europe, India, and Australia: With Papers on the Education of Women, Technical Instruction, and Payment by Results. C. W. Bardeen. 1895.
- The Thackerays in India and Some Calcutta Graves. London: Henry Frowde. 1897.
- Williams Jackson, A. V., ed. (1906). History of India: From the first European settlements to the founding of the English East India Company . Vol. 6. London: Grolier Society.
- Williams Jackson, A. V., ed. (1907). History of India: The European struggle for Indian supremacy in the seventeenth century . Vol. 7. London: Grolier Society.

=== Works about Hunter ===
- Francis Henry Bennett Skrine (1901). Life of Sir William Wilson Hunter, K.C.S.I. Longmans, Green.

== See also ==
- The Imperial Gazetteer of India
- Hunterian transliteration
- Census of India prior to independence
