= Byron v. Rajneesh Foundation International =

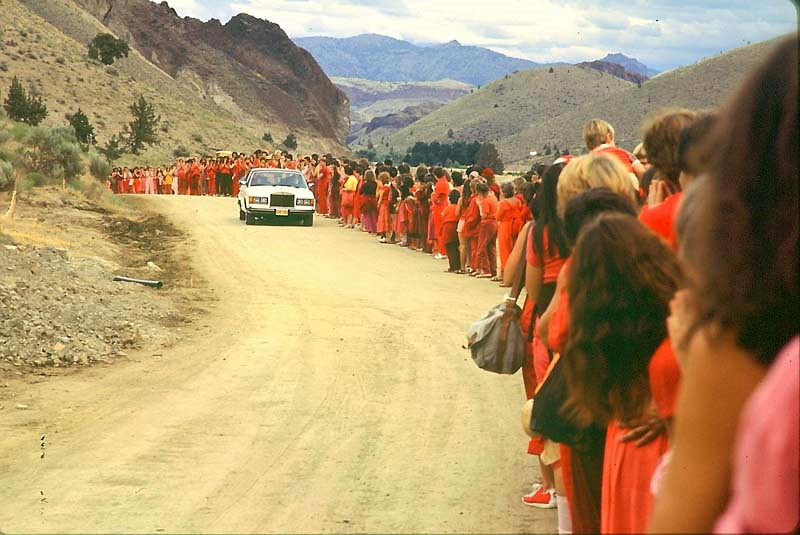
- Bhagwan Shree Rajneesh driving past followers in Rajneeshpuram in 1982
- Court: United States District Court for the District of Oregon
- Full case name: Helen C. Byron v. Rajneesh Foundation International
- Decided: May 25, 1985
- Citation: Byron v. Rajneesh Foundation Intern., 634 F. Supp. 489 (D. Or. 1985)

Case history
- Subsequent action: Multiple motions by Rajneesh Foundation International

Holding
- After a jury award in favor of Byron, the court denied motions for a new trial and for judgment notwithstanding the verdict and upheld an award of punitive damages.

Court membership
- Judge sitting: Chief Judge Owen M. Panner

Byron v. Rajneesh Foundation International was a 1985 lawsuit filed by Helen Byron in Portland, Oregon, against Rajneesh Foundation International, the organization of Indian guru Bhagwan Shree Rajneesh (now known as Osho). Byron had been recruited to join the Rajneesh movement by her daughter, Barbara. She traveled to India to join her daughter and the organization. Byron provided over US$300,000 to the organization, and some of the money was used to buy an armored Rolls-Royce for Rajneesh. Byron spoke to the legal leader of the organization, Ma Anand Sheela (Sheela Silverman), and requested that her money be returned, asserting that it was a loan. Sheela reportedly told her that the money would be returned to her once the group moved to Oregon. Byron followed the organization to its location in Oregon, known as Rajneeshpuram, and requested through an attorney that her money be returned. In 1985, she filed a lawsuit against the organization in federal court, in the United States District Court for the District of Oregon.

Both Byron and Sheela testified in the case: Byron testified that her money was a loan to the organization to purchase land in India, and Sheela that the money was a donation to the organization. A survey submitted by the Rajneesh organization in the case was deemed unreliable by the judge because the survey had been conducted by volunteers who were also members of the organization. The jury decided in favor of Byron, and awarded her her money plus punitive damages. Subsequent to the jury decision, Ma Anand Sheela and an inner circle of followers of Bhagwan Shree Rajneesh at Rajneeshpuram compiled a hit list of people they planned to murder, including both Helen and Barbara Byron, as well as United States Attorney Charles Turner and Oregon Attorney General David Frohnmayer. Sheela and other followers obtained handguns in Texas and false identification in New York, but the plot was never carried out.

== Byron requests return of money from Rajneesh ==
Helen C. Byron, originally from Santa Fe, New Mexico, was recruited into the Rajneesh movement by her daughter Barbara J. Byron, who had previously joined the group in India. She traveled to India and joined her daughter as a follower of Bhagwan Shree Rajneesh in 1978. Within the Osho movement Helen Byron was known as Ma Idam Shunyo, and Barbara J. Byron was referred to as Makima.

Byron gave considerable sums of money to Rajneesh, and lent or contributed more than US$300,000 to his group which was used to purchase an armored Rolls-Royce for him. Byron requested the money be returned to her and said it was a loan, and stated that the legal leader and president of the Rajneesh organization, Ma Anand Sheela, had only asked for the money on a temporary basis. Byron stated Sheela was aware that Byron needed the money returned for treatment and special needs related to her multiple sclerosis.

James T. Richardson writes in the 2004 book Regulating Religion that "Ma Sheela is alleged to have stalled Mrs. Byron, using the reasoning that the group was soon to relocate in Oregon, and that the money would be returned after that." Bhagwan Shree Rajneesh moved to Oregon and Byron moved as well, and communicated through a lawyer to Rajneesh that she still requested the return of her money. According to the Associated Press, Byron left the organization in 1984 after Ma Anand Sheela requested followers commit themselves to a lifestyle that Byron did not agree with.

== Portland federal trial ==
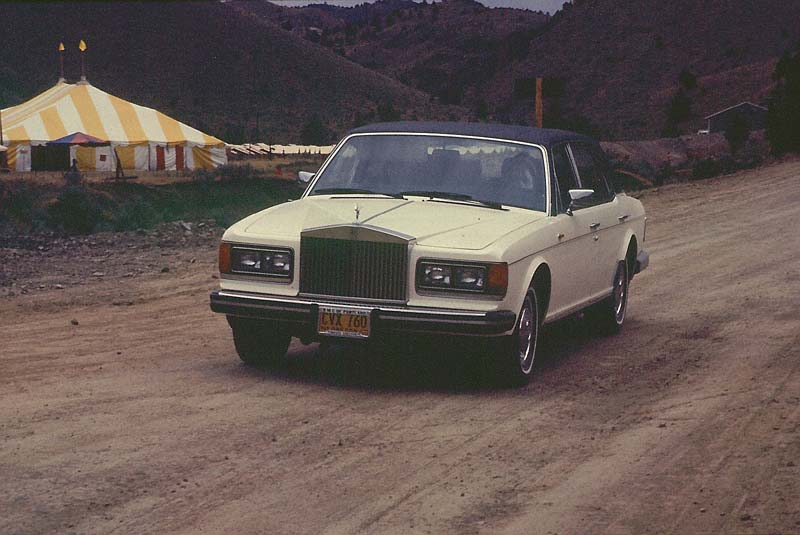
Bhagwan Shree Rajneesh driving one of his Rolls-Royces in Rajneeshpuram in 1982

Byron filed a lawsuit against Rajneesh Foundation International claiming she had been defrauded by the organization, and the suit proceeded to a six-member jury trial in 1985 in federal court Portland, Oregon. Byron's claim included $309,990 she stated she had given as a loan to the Rajneesh Foundation, in addition to $80,000 she had deposited in a Rajneeshee bank, and $1.5 million in punitive damages. Byron testified at trial that the $309,990 was given in 1980 as a loan to Rajneesh Foundation International for the organization to buy land in Poona, India, and that the $80,000 was to be held in safekeeping, while Ma Anand Sheela testified that Byron's money was a donation and not a loan. Rajneesh Foundation International submitted an opinion survey in the case, but the survey was conducted by volunteer members of the organization itself. Participants in the survey were able to identify the volunteers as members of the Rajneesh organization, and the court ruled that the results of the survey were unreliable. The trial concluded on May 25, 1985. The jury decided Byron's money should be returned to her, in addition to $1.25 million in punitive damages against Rajneesh Foundation International. The total amount awarded to Byron by the jury was $1.64 million, and the jury concluded that Byron had been deliberately misled by Sheela. The jury, composed of three women and three men, came to the conclusion that Ma Anand Sheela committed a "wanton" violation of Byron's trust, and that Byron had been under Sheela's "domination". The jury came to its decision after deliberating for just over two hours.

Ma Anand Sheela, the spokesman for Bhagwan Shree Rajneesh at the time, stated that the jury verdict shows "Rajneeshees can't get a fair trial in Oregon". Sheela characterized the lawsuit as part of the government's plan to "destroy the Rajneeshees" by utilizing "poison" of former followers, and said that the organization would appeal the verdict. Rajneesh spokeswoman Ma Prem Isabel stated: "I think Oregonians basically are trying to bring their bigotry into the court, and until now they are doing pretty good. We'll see how they do on appeal. This is witchhunting if I ever saw it. I know the government is out to get this community."

Rajneeshee attorney Swami Prem Niren (Philip Toelkes) argued before the United States District Court for the District of Oregon in November 1985 that the financial situation of the Rajneesh organization was such that it would take time to sell off assets to raise capital. He attempted to block execution of the jury judgment against the organization. Judge Owen Panner ruled that the judgment and collateral for paying it would remain, due to the uncertain financial circumstances of the Rajneesh organization. Byron received $975,000 of the judgment on November 27, 1985. Judge Panner refused to order Byron to return the funds to the Rajneesh organization.

According to Byron's attorney, the Rajneeshees paid for a majority of the judgment by signing over a Southern California building owned by the organization to her. According to Richardson, this was partly done in order to avoid the appeal process, since the Rajneeshees at the time were busy dealing with a plethora of other legal matters. Richardson notes that "in every disputed point of fact in the case the jury sided with the plaintiff, Mrs. Byron, and they chose as well to punish by awarding punitive damages". The jury also awarded Byron the return of money for which no records existed.

== Assassination plot ==
After the jury decision, Ma Anand Sheela gathered an inner circle of at least three or four women followers of Bhagwan Shree Rajneesh at Rajneeshpuram and assembled a hit list of enemies of the organization. In total the former personal secretary to Bhagwan Shree Rajneesh along with three others planned to murder nine people. This list included journalist for the Portland paper The Oregonian, Leslie Zaitz, United States Attorney Charles Turner, Oregon Attorney General David Frohnmayer, Rajneesh's former secretary Laxmi Thakarsi Kuruwa (Ma Yoga Laxmi), and Helen Byron along with her daughter Barbara who had testified on her behalf at trial.

Frohnmayer was originally intended to be the first murder victim, but Turner was made the primary target because the followers believed there were soon to be federal indictments against the organization. Sheela and three other individuals purchased handguns in Texas, obtained false identification in New York, and waited near Turner's house in Portland. In addition to Sheela, other followers involved in the plot reportedly included Ma Shanti Bhadra (Catherine Jane Stork) and Ma Yoga Vidya (Ann Phyllis McCarthy). The assassination plot against Turner was never carried out, and actions against others on the list were never fully executed.
