= Ian Hughes (epredator) =

Technology evangelist

Ian Hughes (a.k.a. epredator)
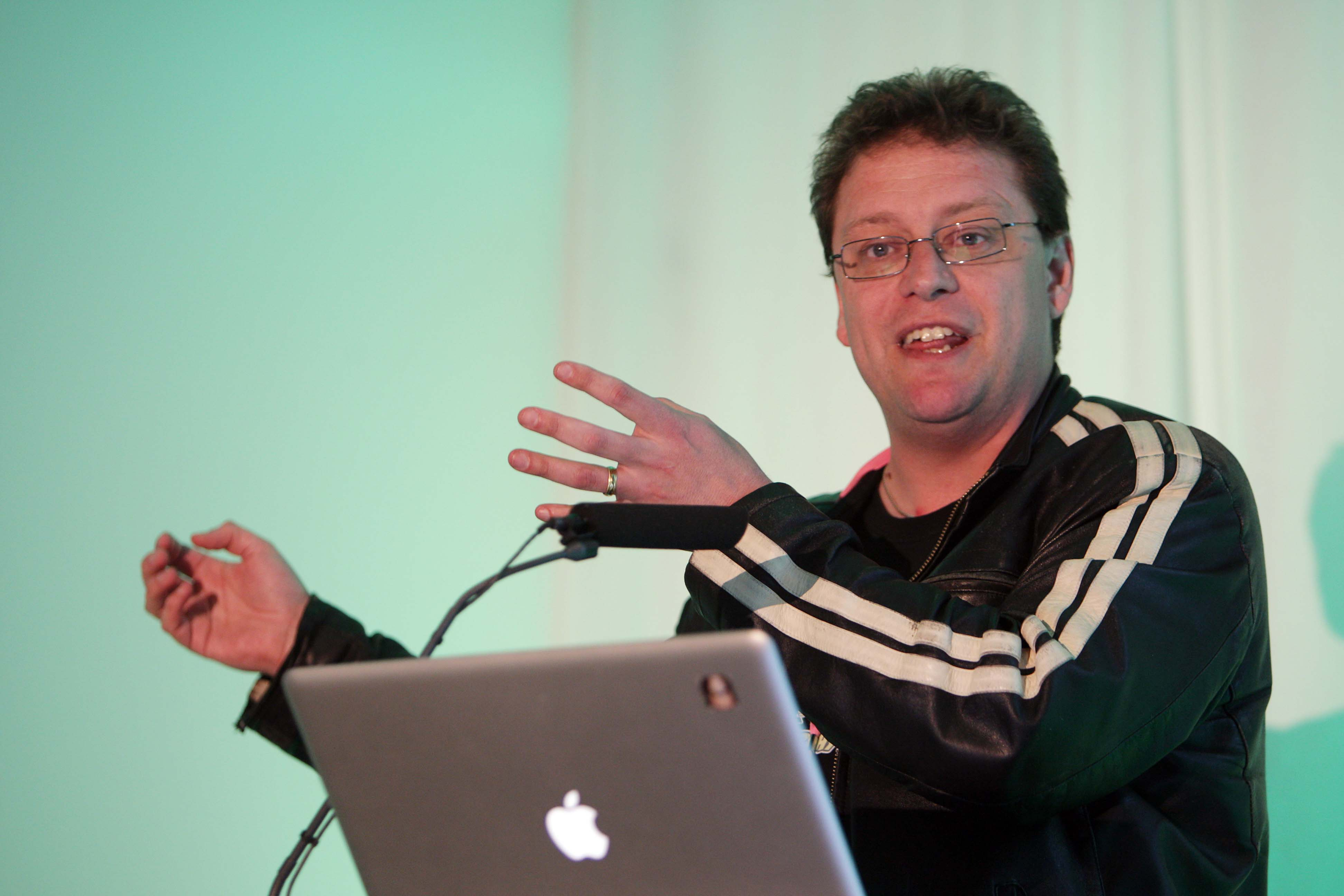
- Hughes speaking at ACE (Awakening, Creative, Entrepreneurship) Conference held in Derry, UK in 2009.
- Born: 31 August 1967 (age 58); Norfolk, England, United Kingdom
- Other name: epredator
- Occupations: Metaverse evangelist, technology industry analyst, television personality
- Known for: Technology innovation, metaverse thought leadership
- Television: The Cool Stuff Collective
- Honours: Doctor of Emerging Technology, Solent University (2018)

Ian Hughes, also known as epredator, (born 30 or 31 August 1967 in Norfolk, England) is a British metaverse evangelist, technology industry analyst, and television personality. In 2006, he set about leading a group of like-minded individuals and subsequently many thousands of colleagues at IBM into virtual worlds like Second Life, and beyond. (Hughes' effort in Second Life, where he is known as Epredator Potato was documented extensively in a 2007 report.) This sparked a massive growth in interest from enterprises and press alike. Hughes was a public figure in Web 2.0 and, formerly, a blogger on Eightbar, a site maintained by former and current IBM employees on the fringes of innovation within their labs.

== Early years and career ==
A self-described programmer since he was 14, Hughes attended Oriel Grammar School in Gorleston, Great Yarmouth, Norfolk, and De Montfort University (formerly Leicester Polytechnic) in Leicester, Leicestershire, where he received a BSc in Information Technology.

Hughes is a former Consulting IT Specialist who worked on emerging technologies at IBM for 20 years. He is now an independent consultant under the business called Feeding Edge Ltd. As a gamer, he describes seeing a massive increase in the capability and design ethics within games and the rise of online gaming.

In 1997, Hughes started working on the World Wide Web, changing his perspective on the science and technology and business due to the much richer mix of people involved in the web revolution. He told part of this story in a 2008 interview with Rita J. King on The Imagination Age, in which he described how in 1992 he was one of the earliest advocates of using PCs at IBM.

In 2015 and 2016, Hughes self-published two science fiction novels, Reconfigure and Cont3xt (as epredator). The books reflect many of the technologies and themes that he has been evangelising, including virtual worlds and the metaverse.

In 2018, Hughes was awarded an honorary doctorate in Emerging Technology, by Solent University.

== Views ==
As a public speaker and Internet personality (Tim Guest's book Second Lives: A Journey Through Virtual Worlds features Hughes in a chapter) he shares his experiences both of the growing virtual worlds industry, the changes in culture, personal experiences of challenging the status quo and leading through doing. "Every time I see something as stupid, I realise it's the thing I should pay the most attention to," he said in a 2008 interview.

Cultural and technology changes and new ways to operate across companies is a core theme. In 2008 he received the first industry award for Innovation in Virtual Worlds in the Enterprise. "When I'm in the metaverse, I'm physically at my computer, mentally I am at that virtual location," Hughes told the BBC in 2007. As a digital native his epredator persona spans many Web 2.0 places, blogs, PlayStation Network, World of Warcraft, Xbox Live, Twitter, Flickr, LinkedIn, etc. Understanding how to use that presence, still representing himself but with elements of theatre brought about by more creative expression online, he says, has led him beyond being the programmer he grew up as.

As a metaverse evangelist, a term it is believed he first brought into popular use, he is an advocate for the widespread application and use of virtual worlds. Virtual worlds, Hughes says, extend to more than just entertainment or corporate communication. "They represent past cultures, existing places, instrumenting the planet, showing business process models in actions the list goes on. Metaverses can also be used to deliver virtual goods, but now making those virtual goods real again is possible. Rapid fabrication and the rise of the fabricaneur heralds another phase in our existence online."

Between 2010 and 2011, he presented a thread on emerging technology on the television series The Cool Stuff Collective by Archie Productions, covering topics such as 3D printers, haptics, scanning and virtual worlds.

== Affiliations ==
Hughes is chairman of the British Computer Society (BCS) Animation and Games Specialist Group.

Since 2016, he has worked as a Senior Analyst for Internet of Things and Metaverse at TMT 451 Research S&P Global Market Intelligence.
