= Tim Guest =

English author and journalist

Tim Guest

Tim Guest (16 July 1975 – 31 July 2009) (also known as Yogesh and Errol Mysterio) was an English author and journalist.

== Early childhood ==
When he was four, Guest was left in the UK by his psychologist mother, Anne Geraghty, who went to India and became involved with the emergent Rajneesh movement, founded by the Indian mystic Bhagwan Shree Rajneesh, now known as Osho. She returned from her trip dressed all in orange and with a new name: Ma Prem Vismaya, a Sanskrit name which translates as "wonderful love". She dyed Tim's clothes orange and gave him a mala, a bead necklace with picture of Bhagwan. Tim was given the new name—Swami Prem Yogesh, meaning 'Love of Yoga'.

Tim and his mother moved to Medina, a large sannyas commune in Suffolk, England that ran from 1981 to 1985; here Tim went to the commune school, where English and maths were compulsory and history and politics were not taught. Guest spent his youth moving between Osho communes in England, India, Germany and the United States, a childhood he was later to describe as "somewhere in between Peter Pan and Lord of the Flies".

== Return to London and teenage years ==
His mother left the movement when he was 11 years old and they returned to London.

== Higher education ==
He attended Sussex University where he studied psychology, and obtained a MA degree in creative writing from the University of East Anglia.

== Career ==
Guest had articles published in The Guardian, The Observer and the Telegraph Magazine. He published two books: My Life in Orange (2004) about his early life growing up in the Osho movement; and Second Lives (2008), about virtual communities where he was known as Errol Mysterio.

== Death ==
Guest died in July 2009 after a suspected drug overdose at 34 years old. He was found dead by his wife Jo; despite her effort to resuscitate him she was unable to revive him. Tests found 1,020 micrograms of morphine per litre of blood. Barnet coroners verdict was that he died of non-dependent drug use.

== Major works ==
- My Life in Orange, London: Granta Books, 2004
- Second Lives: A Journey Through Virtual Worlds, London: Random House, 2008
