= Rajat Mittal =

Computational fluid dynamicist

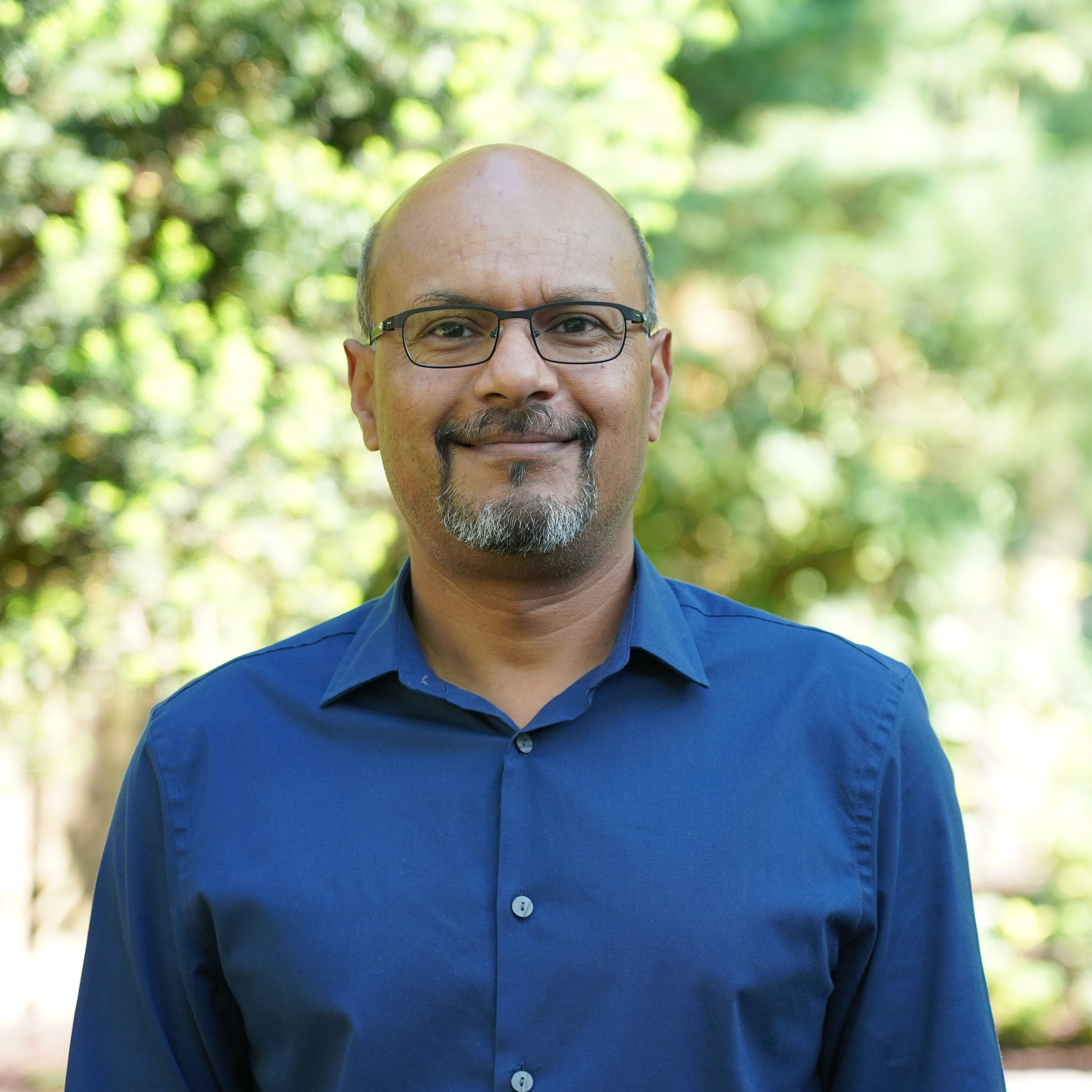
- Rajat Mittal
- Born: 1967 (age 58–59); India
- Known for: Computational fluid dynamics Active flow control Biomechanics
- Title: Professor of mechanical engineering and medicine
- Awards: Fellow of the American Physical Society 2011; Fellow of the American Society of Mechanical Engineers 2011; ASME Lewis Moody Award (2006); The Francois Naftali Frenkiel Award for Fluid Mechanics (1996)

Academic background
- Education: University of Illinois at Urbana–Champaign; University of Florida; IIT Kanpur

Academic work
- Institutions: Johns Hopkins University; George Washington University; University of Florida
- Website: Rajat-Mittal | JHU.edu; FASG | JHU.edu

Rajat Mittal is a computational fluid dynamicist and a professor of mechanical engineering in the Whiting School of Engineering at Johns Hopkins University. He holds a secondary appointment in the Johns Hopkins University School of Medicine. He is known for his work on immersed boundary methods (IBMs) and applications of these methods to the study of fluid flow problems.

== Biography ==
Mittal earned his bachelor's degree in aeronautical engineering from IIT Kanpur in 1989. He received an MS in aerospace engineering from University of Florida and a PhD in applied mechanics from University of Illinois at Urbana–Champaign 1991 and 1995, respectively. He completed postdoctoral research at the Center for Turbulence Research at Stanford University, where he conducted research in large-eddy simulation of complex turbulent flows.

From 1996 to 2001, he was on the faculty of the Department of Mechanical Engineering at the University of Florida. From 2001 to 2009, Mittal was on the faculty of the Department of Mechanical and Aerospace Engineering at George Washington University. He has been a professor of mechanical engineering at Johns Hopkins University since 2009 and a professor of medicine since 2015.

Mittal is the founder and chief technical officer of HeartMetrics, Inc., a start-up that develops computational tools to help the treatment of coronary artery disease.

== Research ==
Mittal leads the Flow Physics and Computation Lab at Johns Hopkins. The focus of Mittal's lab is on fundamental fluid mechanics phenomenon and numerical analysis. In particular, his lab works on computational modeling of fluid flows, biofluid mechanics, bioinspired engineering, biomedical engineering, and flow control. Recent projects have focused on flow control, flow-induced flutter, flow-induced vibration, biolocomotion, biosensing, bioacoustics, cardiovascular hemodynamics, heart murmurs and thrombosis, gastric fluid mechanics, and the flow physics of COVID-19. During his time at Johns Hopkins, Mittal has made significant contributions to many topics in fluid mechanics, spanning cardiovascular fluid dynamics, fundamental mechanisms of human and animal swimming, development of immersed boundary methods, iterative methods in scientific computing, bioacoustics, and turbulent flows. Mittal is also a holder of multiple patents on image-based analysis of cardiovascular hemodynamics.

== Awards and honors ==
- 2022: 2022 Stanley Corrsin Award, for seminal and visionary contributions to the development of immersed boundary methods
- 2021: 2021 ASME Freeman Scholar, for pioneering work on immersed boundary methods
- 2020: Monte and Usha Ahuja Distinguished Lecture, "The Unknown Unknowns of the Airborne Transmission of COVID-19." Sept. 4, 2020. The Ohio State University, Columbus, OH.
- 2011: Elected Fellow of the American Physical Society
- 2011: Elected Fellow of the American Society of Mechanical Engineers
- 2008: Minta-Martin Lecture, University of Maryland at College Park, MD.
- 2006: ASME Lewis B Moody Award from the ASME Fluids Engineering Division, for his paper titled "Vortex Dynamics and Mechanisms for Viscous Losses in the Tip-Clearance Flow," FEDSM2005-77175.
- 1999: Pratt & Whitney Fellows Lecture, "Direct and Large–Eddy Simulation of Flows in Complex Geometries." East Hartford, CT.
- 1996: The Francois Naftali Frenkiel Award for Fluid Mechanics, from the Division of Fluid Dynamics of The American Physical Society, for paper titled "Effect of three-dimensionality on the lift and drag of nominally two-dimensional cylinder," published in Physics of Fluids.

== Editorship ==
- Associate Editor, Journal of Computational Physics (2009 onwards)
- Associate Editor, Journal of Experimental Biology (2012 onwards)
- Associate Editor, Frontiers in Computational Physiology and Medicine (2010 onwards).
- Member, Editorial Board of International Journal of Numerical Methods in Bioeng. (2019 onwards)
- Guest Editor, Theoretical and Computational Fluid Dynamics (2023)

== Publications ==
=== Selected articles ===
- H.S. Udaykumar, R. Mittal, P. Rampunggoon and A.Khanna. "A Sharp Interface Cartesian Grid Method for Simulating Flows with Complex Moving Boundaries." Journal of Computational Physics, Vol 174, 345-380, 2001. (162 Citations)
- R. Mittal. "Computational Biohydrodynamics: Trends, Challenges and Recent Advances." IEEE Journal of Oceanic Engineering Vol. 29, No. 3, pp. 595–604, 2004.
- R. Mittal and G. Iaccarino. "Immersed Boundary Methods." Annual Review Of Fluid Mechanics, Vol. 37, pp. 239–261, 2005.
- R. Holman, Y. Utturkar, R. Mittal, B. Smith and L. Cattafesta. "A Jet Formation Criterion for Synthetic Jets." AIAA Journal, Vol. 43, No.10, October 2005. (52 Citations)
- R Mittal, BD Erath, MW Plesniak. "Fluid Dynamics of Human Phonation and Speech." Annual Review of Fluid Mechanics, Vol. 45:437-467, 2013.
- Rajat Mittal, Jung Hee Seo, Vijay Vedula, Young J. Choi, Hang Liu, H. Howie Huang, Saurabh Jain, Laurent Younes, Theodore Abraham, and Richard T. George. "Computational modeling of cardiac hemodynamics: Current status and future outlook." Journal of Computational Physics, Volume 305, 2016.
- R Mittal, R Ni, JH Seo. "The flow physics of COVID-19." Journal of Fluid Mechanics Volume 894, 2020.

=== Books ===
- Synthetic Jets: Fundamentals and Applications, Eds. Kamran Mohseni, Rajat Mittal. CRC Press. September 17, 2014 by CRC Press. Reference - 382 Pages - 261 B/W Illustrations ISBN 9781439868102.
