= Rajneesh movement =

Persons inspired by the Indian mystic Osho

- Rajneesh (rightmost) and disciples in darshan at Poona in 1977

Founder
- Rajneesh (born Chandra Mohan Jain)

Regions with significant populations
- Countries; India, Nepal, Germany, Italy, The Netherlands and United States; Communities; Pune, India; Rajneeshpuram, Oregon, United States

Religions
- Teachings of Rajneesh

Website
- https://www.osho.com/

The Rajneesh movement is a new religious movement inspired by the Indian godman known as Rajneesh or Osho (1931–1990). They were formerly known as Rajneeshees, "neo-sanyassins" (or simply "sanyassins") or "Orange People" (because of the orange clothing they wore from 1970 until 1985). Members of the movement are sometimes called Oshoites in the Indian press.

The movement was controversial in the 1970s and 1980s, due to Osho's hostility first to Hindu morality in India and later to Christian morality in the United States. In the Soviet Union, the movement was banned as being contrary to "positive aspects of Indian culture and to the aims of the youth protest movement in Western countries".

Rajneeshpuram, an intentional community founded by the group in Wasco County, Oregon, caused immediate tensions in the local community for its attempts to take over the nearby town of Antelope and later the county seat of The Dalles.

At the peak of these tensions, a circle of leading members of the Rajneeshpuram Oregon commune was arrested for crimes including a plot to assassinate U.S. Attorney Charles H. Turner and the United States's first recorded bio-terror attack calculated to influence the outcome of a local election in their favour; these efforts ultimately failed. In the bioterror attack, Salmonella bacteria were deployed to infect salad products in a variety of local establishments, which poisoned several hundred people. The Bhagwan, as Rajneesh was then called, was deported from the United States in 1985 as part of his Alford plea deal following the convictions of members of his staff and his former assistant Ma Anand Sheela, who were found guilty of the attack. After his deportation, 21 countries denied him entry. The movement's headquarters eventually returned to Pune, India. The Oregon commune was destroyed in September 1985.

The movement in India gradually received a more positive response from the surrounding society, especially after the founder's death in 1990. The Osho International Foundation (OIF), previously the Rajneesh International Foundation, is managed by an "Inner Circle" set up by Rajneesh before his death. They jointly administer Rajneesh's estate and operate the Osho International Meditation Resort in Pune.

In the late 1990s, former followers and affiliated groups challenged OIF's copyright holdings over Rajneesh's works and the validity of its royalty claims on publishing or reprinting of materials. In the United States, following a 10-year legal battle with Osho Friends International (OFI), the OIF (Osho International Foundation) lost its exclusive rights over the trademark OSHO in January 2009.

In 2017, the General Court of the European Union ruled in favour of the Osho International Foundation in a dispute concerning the "OSHO" trademark and upheld its registration in the European Union.

There are numerous centres of the movement in India and elsewhere, including in the United States, the United Kingdom, Germany, Italy, and the Netherlands.

== History ==
=== Origins ===
Rajneesh's birthday celebrations at his Bombay residence on 11 December 1972

Rajneesh began speaking in public in 1958, while still a lecturer (later professor) in philosophy at Jabalpur University. He lectured throughout India during the 1960s, promoting meditation and the ideals of free love, a social movement based on a civil libertarian philosophy that rejects state regulation and religious interference in personal relationships; he also denounced marriage as a form of social bondage, especially for women. He criticised socialism and Gandhi, but supported capitalism, science, technology and birth control, warning against overpopulation and criticising religious teachings that he said promoted poverty and subjection.

He became known as Acharya Rajneesh, Acharya meaning "teacher or professor" and "Rajneesh" being a childhood nickname (from Sanskrit रजनि rajani, night and ईश isha, lord). By 1964, a group of wealthy backers had initiated an educational trust to support Rajneesh and aid in the running of meditation retreats. The association formed at this time was known as Jivan Jagruti Andolan (Hindi for 'Life Awakening Movement'). As sociologist Marion Goldman puts it, his rapidly growing clientele suggested "that he was an unusually talented spiritual therapist". Around this time he "acquired a business manager" from the upper echelons of Indian society, Laxmi Thakarsi Kuruwa, a politically well-connected woman who would function as his personal secretary and organisational chief. She became Rajneesh's first sannyasin (संन्यास, disciple), taking the name Ma Yoga Laxmi. Laxmi, the daughter of a key supporter of the Nationalist Congress Party, with close ties to Gandhi, Nehru and Morarji Desai, retained this role for almost 15 years.

=== Growth ===
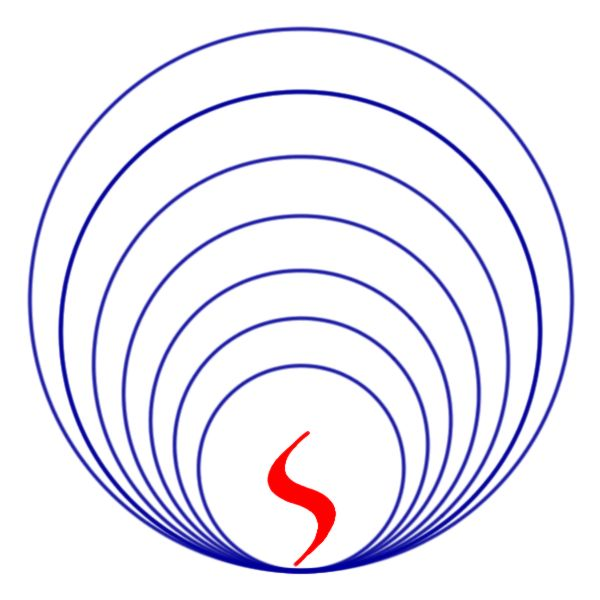
Symbol of the Life Awakening Movement c. 1970

University of Jabalpur officials forced Rajneesh to resign his position in 1966. He developed his role as a spiritual teacher, supporting himself through lectures, meditation camps and individual meetings (दर्शन, Darshan or darśana—meaning "sight") for his wealthier followers. In 1971 he initiated six sannyasins, the emergence of the Neo-Sannyas International Movement. Rajneesh differentiated his sannyas from the traditional practice, admitting women and viewing renunciation as a process of renouncing ego rather than the world. Disciples still adopted the traditional mala, and ochre robe, and change of name. At this time, Rajneesh adopted the title "Bhagwan Shree Rajneesh".

By 1972, he had initiated 3,800 sannyasins in India. The total for the rest of the world at that time was 134, including 56 from the United States, 16 each from Britain and Germany, 12 each from Italy and the Philippines, 8 in Canada, 4 in Kenya, 2 in Denmark and 1 each from France, the Netherlands, Australia, Greece, Sweden, Norway and Switzerland. After a house was purchased for Rajneesh in Poona in 1974, he founded an ashram, and membership of the movement grew. More seekers began to visit from western nations, including therapists from the Human Potential Movement. They began to run group therapy at the ashram.

Rajneesh became the first Eastern guru to embrace modern psychotherapy. He discoursed daily upon religious scriptures, combining elements of Western philosophy, jokes and personal anecdotes. He commented on Hinduism, Zen and other religious sources, and Western psychotherapeutic approaches.

Swami Prem Amitabh (Robert Birnbaum), one of the therapists in the Poona ashram, estimates that there were about 100,000 sannyasins by 1979. Bob Mullan, a sociologist from the University of East Anglia, states that "at any one time there were about 6,000 Rajneeshees in Poona, some visiting for weeks or months to do groups or meditations, with about two thousand working and living on a permanent basis in and around the ashram." Lewis F. Carter, a sociologist from the Washington State University, estimates that 2,000 sannyasins resided at Rajneeshpuram, Oregon at its height.

A long drawn-out fight with land use non-profit organisation 1000 Friends of Oregon hurt the organisation. This took the form of both organisations pursuing legal interventions against each other. 1000 Friends objected to Rajneesh's proposed building plans in Antelope, near Rajneeshpuram. The fight lasted for several years and attracted the attention of various media outlets.

=== 1984 bio-terror attack and subsequent decline ===
Several incidents that led to a decline of the movement occurred in The Dalles, the county seat and largest city of Wasco County, Oregon.

In 1984, Rajneeshee teams engaged in a bioterror attack in which they purposely contaminated salad products with salmonella at local restaurants and shops. Their actions resulted in the non-lethal poisoning of 751 people. The motivation behind the attack was to rig the local election allowing the Rajneeshees to gain political power in the city and county. According to scholar Syed Adrian Ali Shah, the attack was an act of Hindu terrorism.

The Rajneeshees were also discovered to have been running what was called "the longest wiretapping operation ever uncovered".

These revelations brought criminal charges against several Rajneeshee leaders, including Ma Anand Sheela, personal secretary to Rajneesh, who pleaded guilty to charges of attempted murder and assault.

The convictions would eventually lead to the deportation of the leader of the movement, Rajneesh, along with a 10-year suspended sentence and $400,000 fine, in 1985. Professor of Religious Studies at Ohio State University, Hugh B. Urban, has commented that the most surprising feature of the Osho phenomenon lies in Rajneesh's "remarkable apotheosis upon his return to India", which resulted in his achieving even more success in his homeland than before. According to Urban, Rajneesh's followers had succeeded in portraying him as a martyr, promoting the view that the Ranch "was crushed from within by the Attorney General's office ... like the marines in Lebanon, the Ranch was hit by hardball opposition and driven out."

In 1986, after being deported from the U.S., and before arriving at India, Rajneesh wandered throughout Europe with his jet, going from country to country. He flew to Greece but was arrested by "scores of armed police" and was then deported again. He then flew to Ireland, where he stayed for awhile in a luxury hotel, but eventually decided to leave for Spain. Eventually, he reached India, although he traveled to a variety of other places before arriving in India, including Uruguay, Canada and Nepal, among many others.

In 1990, Rajneesh died and was cremated at the ashram in Poona; which became the Osho International Meditation Resort. Identifying as the Esalen of the East, the resort has classes in a variety of spiritual techniques from a broad range of traditions and markets the facility as a spiritual oasis, a "sacred space" for discovering one's self, and uniting the desires of body and mind in a resort environment. According to press reports, it attracts some 200,000 people from all over the world each year; prominent visitors have included politicians, media personalities and the Dalai Lama.

After Rajneesh's death, various disagreements ensued concerning his wishes and his legacy. This led to the formation of a number of rival collectives. One of the central disagreements related to OIF's copyright control over his works. One group, Osho Friends International, spent 10 years challenging the OIF's use of the title OSHO as an exclusive trademark.

The movement continued after Rajneesh's death. The Osho International Foundation (OIF), the successor to the Neo-Sannyas International Foundation, now propagates his views, operating once more out of the Pune ashram in India. The organisation ran a pre-web, global computer network called "OSHONET" in the 1990s, before communicating on the Internet. Current leaders of Pune have allegedly downplayed early controversies in Oregon in an effort to appeal to a wider audience.

In 2003, sociologist Stephen Hunt wrote in Alternative Religions that "the movement has declined since 1985, and some would argue it is now, for all intents and purposes, defunct."

In the United States, on 13 January 2009, the exclusive rights that OIF held over the trademark were finally lost. OIF filed a Notice of Appeal on 12 March, but eventually filed for withdrawal in the Court of Appeals on 19 June, thus cancelling the trademarks of Osho in the US.

On 16 March 2018, Netflix released a six-part documentary entitled Wild Wild Country regarding the Rajneesh movement.

OSHO facilities continue to operate in a large variety of countries, ranging from staffed meditation centres and resorts with regular programmes to smaller venues offering occasional meditation meetings and information. According to some sources, at the organisations peak, the OIF had around 20,000 disciples. Estimates vary, though, as according to multiple sources, there were around 30,000 to 40,000 sannyasins at the peak of the OIF in Germany alone. Another source noted that there were 30,000 in Germany at the peak of OIF membership, and that that roughly correlated to "around a third of the world's supporters". If correct, this would mean there were around 90,000 sannyasins at the peak of the international organisation.

== Beliefs and practices ==
=== Religion ===
A 1972 monograph (named "I Am the Gate") outlined Rajneesh's concept of sannyas. According to the monograph, it was to be a worldwide movement, rooted in the affirmation of life, playful, joyful and based on science rather than belief and dogma. It would not rely on ideology and philosophy, but on practices, techniques and methods aiming to offer every individual the chance to discover and choose their own proper religious path; the intent was to lead people to an essential, universal religiousness. According to the same monograph, the movement would be open to people of all religions or of none, experimenting with the inner methods of all religions in their pure, original form, not seeking to synthesise them but to provide facilities whereby each might be revived, maintained and defended and their lost and hidden secrets rediscovered. The movement would allegedly not seek to create any new religion.

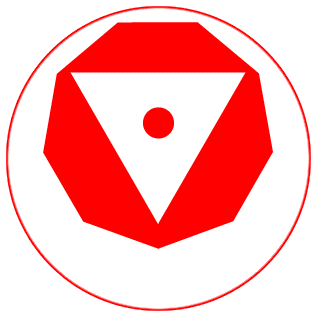
Logo of Neo-Sannyas International. Circa 1970s.

To this end, Rajneesh communities would be founded around the world and groups of sannyasins would tour the world to aid seekers of spiritual enlightenment and demonstrate techniques of meditation. Other groups would perform kirtan (कीर्तन, call and response chanting) and conduct experiments in psychospiritual healing. Communities would run their own businesses, and various publishing companies would be founded. A central International University of Meditation would have branches all over the world and run meditation camps, and study groups would investigate the key texts of Tantra, Taoism, Hinduism and other traditions.

In one survey conducted at Rajneeshpuram, over 70 percent of those surveyed listed their religious affiliation as "none"; however, 60 percent of sannyasins participated in activities of worship several times a month. In late 1981 Rajneesh, through his secretary Ma Anand Sheela (Sheela Silverman), announced the inception of the "religion of Rajneeshism", the basis of which would be fragments taken from various discourses and interviews that Rajneesh had given over the years. In July 1983 Rajneesh Foundation International published a 78-page book entitled Rajneeshism: An introduction to Bhagwan Shree Rajneesh and His Religion, in an attempt to systematise Rajneesh's religious teachings and institutionalise the movement. Despite this, the book claimed that Rajneeshism was not a religion, but rather "a religionless religion ... only a quality of love, silence, meditation and prayerfulness". Carter comments that the motivation for formalising Rajneesh's teachings are not easy to determine, but might perhaps have been tied to a visa application made to the Immigration and Naturalization Service to obtain "religious worker" status for him.

People followed the norms of wearing similar clothes and participating in the same activities. The people were allowed to come and go as they pleased as long as they did not hurt anybody. In the last week of September 1985, after Sheela had fled in disgrace, Rajneesh declared that the religion of "Rajneeshism" and "Rajneeshees" no longer existed, and that anything bearing the name would be dismantled. His disciples set fire to 5,000 copies of the book Rajneeshism. Rajneesh said he ordered the book-burning to rid the sect of the last traces of the influence of Sheela, whose robes were added to the bonfire.

=== Society ===
==== Intentional community ====
Rajneesh held that families, large cities and nations would ultimately be replaced by small communities with a communal way of life. By 1972, small communes of disciples existed in India and Kenya, and a larger one, to be known as Anand Shila, was planned as a "permanent world headquarters" in India. However, this plan was repeatedly thwarted. Large communes were planned in the west. The Rajneesh organisation bought the 64,229-acre (259.93 km^{2}) Big Muddy Ranch near Antelope, Oregon, in July 1981, renaming it Rancho Rajneesh and later Rajneeshpuram. Initially, approximately 2,000 people took up residence in the intentional community, and Rajneesh moved there too. The organisation purchased a reception hotel in Portland. In July 1983 it was bombed by the radical Islamic group Jamaat ul-Fuqra, a group that had connections with militants in Pakistani-held Azad Kashmir and sought to attack "soft" targets with Indian connections in the United States.

The Rajneesh movement clashed with Oregon officials and government while at Rajneeshpuram, resulting in tensions within the commune itself. A siege mentality set in among the commune's leaders, and intimidation and authoritarianism ensued. Disillusioned followers began to leave the organisation. Commune members were instructed to cease communication with anyone who left.

==== Views on marriage and family ====
Although the movement was without clearly defined and shared values, it was well known that Rajneesh discouraged marrying and having children, since he saw families as inherently prone to dysfunction and destructiveness. Not many children were born at the communes in Oregon and England, and contraception, sterilisation, and abortion were accepted. According to Pike, some parents justified leaving their children when moving to the ashram by reasoning that spiritual development was more important.

=== Allegations of sexual abuse of children ===
Rajneesh supported sexual freedom and non-monogamy, and former members reported widespread sexual abuse of children in the community. A survivor recounted that she and her friends were pressured into sexual acts with adult men in the commune. For her, it started at the age of seven and it culminated in rape at the age of twelve. Another survivor told of sexual acts that started when she was ten years old. She alleged that many of the teenagers on the ranch were pressured into sexual relationships with adults, which she characterised as statutory rape and child sexual abuse that was tolerated or concealed within the community. A German survivor gave a similar account, alleging that adults sexually pressured children in the commune and that some girls and boys aged 12–14 had sexual relations with large numbers of adults. She added that adults did not object to such behaviour, which she described as being regarded as normal at the time and not concealed.

The 2024 documentary The Children of the Cult presents an international investigation into the Rajneesh movement that focuses on accounts of widespread sexual abuse of children within the movement. It depicts an environment in which sexual themes were pervasive, children were separated from their parents, and clear boundaries were often absent. The film argues that Rajneesh and his followers sought to create a new society with its own moral code, and it alleges that this setting enabled and normalised serious crimes against children.

=== Commerce ===
Urban has also commented that "one of the most astonishing features of the early Rajneesh movement was its remarkable success as a business enterprise". It "developed an extremely effective and profitable corporate structure", and "by the 1980s, the movement had evolved into a complex, interlocking network of corporations, with an astonishing number of both spiritual and secular businesses worldwide, offering everything from yoga and psychological counselling to cleaning services." It has been estimated that at least 120 million dollars were generated during the movement's time in Oregon, a period when the acquisition of capital, the collection of donations, and legal work were a primary concern. The popular press reported widely on the large collection of Rolls-Royce cars Rajneesh had amassed, reported to be 93 at the final count. James S. Gordon reported that some sannyasins saw the cars as an unrivalled tool for obtaining publicity, others as a good business investment or as a test, others as an expression of Rajneesh's scorn for middle-class aspirations and yet others as an indication of the love of his disciples. Gordon opined that what Rajneesh loved most about the Rolls-Royces, apart from their comfort, was "the anger and envy that his possession of so many—so absurdly, unnecessarily, outrageously many—of them aroused". He wrote of a bumper sticker that was popular among sannyasins: "Jesus Saves. Moses Invests. Bhagwan Spends."

By the mid-1980s, the movement, assisted by a sophisticated legal and business infrastructure, had created a corporate machine consisting of various front companies and subsidiaries. At this time, the three main identifiable organisations within the Rajneesh movement were: the Ranch Church, or Rajneesh International Foundation (RIF); the Rajneesh Investment Corporation (RIC), through which the RFI was managed; and the Rajneesh Neo-Sannyasin International Commune (RNSIC). The umbrella organisation that oversaw all investment activities was Rajneesh Services International Ltd., a company incorporated in the UK but based in Zürich. There were also smaller organisations, such as Rajneesh Travel Corp, Rajneesh Community Holdings, and the Rajneesh Modern Car Collection Trust, whose sole purpose was to deal with the acquisition and rental of Rolls-Royces. By the early 21st century, members of the movement were running stress management seminars for corporate clients such as BMW, and the movement was reported in 2000 to be making $15–45 million annually in the U.S.

From 1981 to 1985, the movement owned an airline, Air Rajneesh.

== Elections ==
During elections Rajneesh's secretary, Sheela, would bring thousands of homeless people from New York, Chicago, Los Angeles, Phoenix, and other cities to live and vote in Rajneeshpuram and Antelope, Oregon. Representative Wayne H. Fawbush, who represented both areas, wanted a special session of the Oregon Legislature to be called to change Oregon's voter registration laws to prevent the homeless being brought by the Rajneeshees from voting.

During the selection of Oregon's thirteen alternate delegates to the 1984 Republican National Convention Ma Prem Kavido, a precinct committee member from Rajneeshpuram and member of the Rajneeshpuram city council, and Ma Prem Debal ran, but both were defeated placing 14th and 15th respectively. Four Rajneeshees from Wasco and Jefferson counties were selected to serve as delegates at the Oregon Republican Party's state convention.

== Demographics ==
One of the first surveys of sannyasins was conducted in 1980 at the Poona ashram by Swami Krishna Deva (David Berry Knapp), an American clinical psychologist who would later serve as mayor of Rajneeshpuram. In the survey, Krishna Deva polled 300 American sannyasins and discovered that their median age was just over 30. Sixty percent of them had been sannyasins for less than two years, and most continued to live in the United States. Half of them came from California, 97 percent were white, 25 percent were Jewish, and 85 percent belonged to the middle and upper-middle classes. Almost two-thirds had university degrees and viewed themselves as "successful in worldly terms". Three-quarters had previously been involved in some therapy and more than half had previously experimented with another spiritual group. In 1984 the average age of members of the Rajneesh movement was 34; 64 percent of the followers had a four-year college degree.

A survey of 635 Rajneeshpuram residents was conducted in 1983 by Norman D. Sundberg, director of the University of Oregon's Clinical/Community Psychology Program, and three of his colleagues. It revealed a middle-class group of predominantly college-educated whites around the age of 30, the majority of whom were women. Nearly three-quarters of those surveyed attributed their decisions to become Rajneeshees to their love for Rajneesh or his teachings. 91 percent stated that they had been looking for more meaning in their lives prior to becoming members. When asked to rate how they felt about their lives as Rajneeshees, Ninety-three percent stated they were "extremely satisfied" or nearly so, most of them choosing the top score on a scale of 0 to 8. Only 8 percent stated that they had been as happy before joining.

== Later developments ==
Internationally, by 2005, Rajneesh's movement had established itself as a new religion. His followers have redefined his contributions, reframing central elements of his teaching so as to make them appear less controversial to outsiders. The Osho International Foundation (OIF) in Pune now runs stress management seminars for corporate clients such as IBM and BMW, with a reported (in 2000) revenue of between $15 and $45 million annually in the US.

OSHO International Meditation Resort in Poona has described itself as the Esalen of the East, and teaches a variety of spiritual techniques from a broad range of traditions. It promotes itself as a spiritual 'oasis', a "sacred space" for discovering one's self and uniting the desires of body and mind. According to press reports, prominent visitors have included politicians and media personalities. As of 2013, the resort required all guests to be tested for HIV/AIDS at its Welcome Center on arrival.

In September 2020, the OSHO International Foundation, which owns the OSHO International Meditation Resort, decided to sell two 1.5 acre plots of land, currently housing a swimming pool and a tennis court. As a charitable trust, the OIF filed an application with the Charity Commissioner in Mumbai requesting permission for the sale. In the application, they cited financial distress due to the COVID-19 pandemic. This sparked controversy amongst Osho followers, and their representative Yogesh Thakkar was quoted saying “This place is made by Osho devotees for Osho devotees, and it belongs to Osho devotees.” Ten Osho disciples filed an objection to the sale with the Charity Commissioner.

== People associated with the movement ==
=== Literature and thought ===
- Joachim-Ernst Berendt, jazz musician, journalist and author. He became a member of the movement in 1983. When Rajneesh died in 1990, he wrote an obituary calling him the "master of the heart" as well as "the holiest scoundrel I ever knew".
- Elfie Donnelly, Anglo-Austrian children's book author. She joined the movement in the 1980s.
- Jörg Andrees Elten, German writer and journalist. He was a reporter for Stern before joining the movement, and later took the name Swami Satyananda.
- Tim Guest, journalist and author. He grew up in the movement with the name Yogesh and later wrote a critical book, My Life in Orange, about his difficult childhood.
- Bernard Levin, English columnist. He joined the movement with his then girlfriend, Arianna Huffington, in the early 1980s and later published glowing accounts of Rajneesh and the movement in The Times. About Rajneesh, he stated: "He is the conduit along which the vital force of the universe flows." Levin later joined the Movement of Spiritual Inner Awareness with Huffington.
- Peter Sloterdijk, German philosopher. He joined the movement in the 1970s. In interviews given in 2006, he credited the experience with having had a fundamental, beneficial and continuing effect on his outlook on life.
- Margot Anand, a teacher of tantra. She was a student of Rajneesh and first began to teach tantra in his ashram.
- Jan Foudraine, Dutch psychiatrist, psychotherapist, writer and mystic. His sannyasin name is Swami Deva Amrito.
- Nirmala Srivastava, Indian spiritual teacher. She was an early member of the Rajneesh movement and later founded a spiritual movement of her own, Sahaja Yoga, repudiating Rajneesh.
- Ma Prem Usha, Indian tarot card reader, fortune teller and journalist. She was a member of the movement for 30 years, until her death in 2008.

=== Performance arts ===
- Parveen Babi, Indian actress. She joined the movement in the mid-1970s together with her former boyfriend, the producer Mahesh Bhatt, and later became a devotee of philosopher U. G. Krishnamurti.
- Mahesh Bhatt, Indian film director, producer and screenwriter. He became a sannyasin in the mid-1970s, but later left the movement and instead found spiritual companionship and guidance with U. G. Krishnamurti, whose biography he wrote in 1992.
- Georg Deuter, also known as Swami Chaitanya Hari, musician of the Rajneesh movement. He composed the music that accompanies Rajneesh's meditation recordings in Poona and later at Rajneeshpuram.
- Mike Edwards, British former member of the Electric Light Orchestra, known as Swami Deva Pramada or simply Pramada.
- Ted Gärdestad, Swami Sangit Upasani, Swedish singer-songwriter who later died by suicide.
- Albert Mol, Dutch actor and author.
- Nena, German singer and actress. In 2009, she stated that she had become a fan of Rajneesh, his books and meditation techniques, which she had discovered a few years earlier.
- Ramses Shaffy, Dutch singer and actor. He was once a heavy drinker, but stopped drinking when he joined the movement in the early 1980s and became Swami Ramses Shaffy. He later relapsed into alcoholism.
- Terence Stamp, British actor. In the 1970s, he spent time at the Poona ashram, meditating and studying the teachings of Rajneesh.
- Kavyen Temperley, Australian lead singer who forms part of Australian band Eskimo Joe.
- Anneke Wills (Ma Prem Anita), British actress most famous for her role as Doctor Who sidekick Polly. After an initial brief visit to India in the late 1970s, Wills moved to India to stay at the Poona ashram with her son Jasper (Swami Dhyan Yogi) during the early 1980s and moved again to a sannyasin commune in California during the mid 1980s.

=== Politics ===
- Arianna Huffington, Greek-American political activist, and her then partner Bernard Levin were disciples in the early 1980s. They later joined the Movement of Spiritual Inner Awareness.
- Vinod Khanna, Indian film star and politician, was Rajneesh's gardener in Rajneeshpuram. He later became India's Minister of State for External Affairs (junior foreign minister), holding office from 2003 to 2004. He became a sannyasin on 31 December 1975 and received the name Swami Vinod Bharti.
- Barbara Rütting, German actress, author and V-Partei3 politician. Her sannyasin name is Ma Anand Taruna.

=== Others ===
- Pratiksha Apurv, an artist, is Rajneesh's niece and has been a member of the movement since the age of 11.
- Prince Welf Ernst of Hanover, eldest son of Prince George William of Hanover and Princess Sophie of Greece and Denmark, joined the movement in 1975 and died from a ruptured cerebral haemorrhage at the age of 33, while at the Poona ashram. Rajneesh gave him the name of Swami Vimalkirti.
- Shannon Jo Ryan, daughter of former Congressman Leo Ryan, who investigated the Jonestown commune of the People's Temple in Guyana and was killed there by followers of the Temple in 1978. She joined the Rajneesh movement in 1981, took the name Ma Prem Amrita Pritam, and married another sannyasin, Peter Waight (Swami Anand Subhuti), at Rajneeshpuram in 1982.
- Ma Prem Pratiti – Lady Zara Jellicoe, daughter of Earl Jellicoe.

== See also ==
- 1985 Rajneeshee assassination plot
- Breaking the Spell: My Life as a Rajneeshee and the Long Journey Back to Freedom
- Byron v. Rajneesh Foundation International
- Rebellious Flower
- New religious movement
- Osho Monsoon Festival
- Wild Wild Country

== Bibliography ==
- Aveling, Harry (1999), Osho Rajneesh and his disciples: some western perceptions, Motilal Banarsidass, ISBN 978-8120815995.
- Brecher, Max (1993), A passage to America, South Asia Books, ISBN 978-9994330218.
- Chryssides, George D. (2001) [1999]. "New Forms of Buddhism: Osho/Rajneesh". Exploring New Religions. Issues in Contemporary Religion. London and New York: Continuum International. pp. 206–214. doi:10.2307/3712544. ISBN 978-0826459596. JSTOR 3712544. OCLC 436090427. S2CID 143265918.
- Carrette, Jeremy; King, Richard (2004), Selling Spirituality: The Silent Takeover of Religion, New York: Routledge, ISBN 0415302099.
- Carter, Lewis F. (1990), Charisma and Control in Rajneeshpuram: A Community without Shared Values, Cambridge: Cambridge University Press, ISBN 0521385547.
- Clarke, Peter Bernard (2006), New religions in global perspective: a study of religious change in the modern world, Routledge, ISBN 0415257484.
- D'Andrea, Anthony (2006), "Osho International Meditation Resort (Pune, 2000s): An Anthropological Analysis of Sannyasin Therapies and the Rajneesh Legacy", Journal of Humanistic Psychology, 47 (1): 1–26.
- FitzGerald, Frances (1986), Cities on a Hill: A Journey Through Contemporary American Cultures, New York: Simon & Schuster, ISBN 0671552090. (Includes a 135-page section on Rajneeshpuram previously published in two parts in The New Yorker magazine, 22 September and 29 September 1986 editions).
- Forsthoefel, Thomas; Humes, Cynthia Ann (2005), Gurus in America, SUNY Press, ISBN 978-0791465745.
- Fox, Judith M. (2002), Osho Rajneesh – Studies in Contemporary Religion Series, No. 4, Salt Lake City: Signature Books, ISBN 1560851562.
- Goldman, Marion S. (1997), "Narcissistic Vulnerability, Transference, and Bhagwan Shree Rajneesh", in Janet Liebman Jacobs, Donald Capps (ed.), Religion, society, and psychoanalysis: readings in contemporary theory, Westview Press, ISBN 0813326486.
- Goldman, Marion S. (2004), "When Leaders Dissolve: Considering Controversy and Stagnation in the Osho Rajneesh Movement", in Lewis, James R.; Petersen, Jesper Aagaard (eds.), Controversial New Religions (1st ed.), New York: Oxford University Press, ISBN 978-0-19-515682-9.
- Goldman, Marion S. (2007), "Avoiding Mass Violence at Rajneeshpuram", in Wellman, James K. (ed.), Belief and bloodshed: religion and violence across time and tradition, Rowman & Littlefield, ISBN 978-0742558243.
- Gordon, James S. (1987), The Golden Guru, Lexington, MA: The Stephen Greene Press, ISBN 0828906300.
- Heelas, Paul (1996). The New Age Movement: Religion, Culture and Society in the Age of Postmodernity. Cambridge: Blackwell. ISBN 978-0631193326.
- Hunt, Stephen (2003), "Rajneeshees", Alternative religions: a sociological introduction, Ashgate Publishing, Ltd., ISBN 0754634108.
- Idinopulos, Thomas A.; Yonan, Edward A. (1996), The sacred and its scholars: comparative methodologies for the study of primary religious data, Brill, ISBN 9004106235.
- Kakar, Sudhir (1991), Shamans, mystics, and doctors: a psychological inquiry into India and its healing traditions, Chicago, Illinois: University of Chicago Press, ISBN 978-0226422794.
- Kuriansky, Judith (2002), The Complete Idiot's Guide to Tantric Sex, Penguin, ISBN 978-0028641751.
- Latkin, Carl A.; Sundberg, Norman D.; Littman, Richard A.; Katsikis, Melissa G.; Hagan, Richard A. (1994), "Feelings after the fall: former Rajneeshpuram Commune members' perceptions of and affiliation with the Rajneeshee movement", Sociology of Religion, 55 (1): 65, doi:10.2307/3712176, JSTOR 3712176.
- Krishnamurti, U.G.; Arms, Rodney; Pant Bansal, Sunita (2005). Krishnamurti, U.G.; Arms, Rodney; Pant Bansal, Sunita (eds.). The mystique of enlightenment: conversations with U.G. Krishnamurti. Smriti Books. ISBN 978-8187967095.
- Lewis, James R. (2005), Petersen, Jesper Aagaard (ed.), Controversial New Religions, New York: Oxford University Press, ISBN 019515682X.
- Mehta, Uday (1993), Modern Godmen in India: A Sociological Appraisal, Mumbai: Popular Prakashan, ISBN 8171547087.
- Menen, Rajendar (2002), The Miracle of Music Therapy, Pustak Mahal, ISBN 978-8122308068.
- Mistlberger, P.T. (2010), The Three Dangerous Magi: Osho, Gurdjieff, Crowley, O Books, p. 713, ISBN 978-1-84694-435-2.
- Newport, John P. (1998), The New Age movement and the biblical worldview: conflict and dialogue, Wm. B. Eerdmans Publishing, ISBN 978-0802844309.
- Osho (2000), Autobiography of a Spiritually Incorrect Mystic, New York: St. Martin's Griffin, ISBN 0312254571.
- Palmer, Susan J. (1993), Sharma, Arvind (ed.), The Rajneesh Papers: Studies in a New Religious Movement, Delhi: Motilal Banarsidass, ISBN 81-208-1080-5.
- Pike, Sarah M. (2007), "Gender in New Religions", in Bromley, David G. (ed.), Teaching new religious movements, Oxford University Press US, ISBN 978-0195177299.
- Reader, Ian (1996), A Poisonous Cocktail? Aum Shinrikyo's Path to Violence, Nordic Institute of Asian Studies, ISBN 8787062550.
- Shupe, Anson D.; Bromley, David G. (1994), Anti-cult movements in cross-cultural perspective, Garland, p. 274, ISBN 978-0815314288.
- Süss, Joachim (1996), Bhagwans Erbe: Die Osho-Bewegung heute (in German), Munich: Claudius Verlag, ISBN 3532640104.
- Urban, Hugh B. (2005), "Osho, From Sex Guru to Guru of the Rich: The Spiritual Logic of Late Capitalism", in Forsthoefel, Thomas A.; Cynthia Ann Humes (eds.), Gurus in America, SUNY Press, ISBN 978-0791465738.
- Wright, Charles (1985), Oranges & lemmings: the story behind Bhagwan Shree Rajneesh, Richmond Victoria: Greenhouse Publications Pty Ltd, pp. 166 pages, ISBN 0864360126.
