= Mittal Patel =

Indian activist

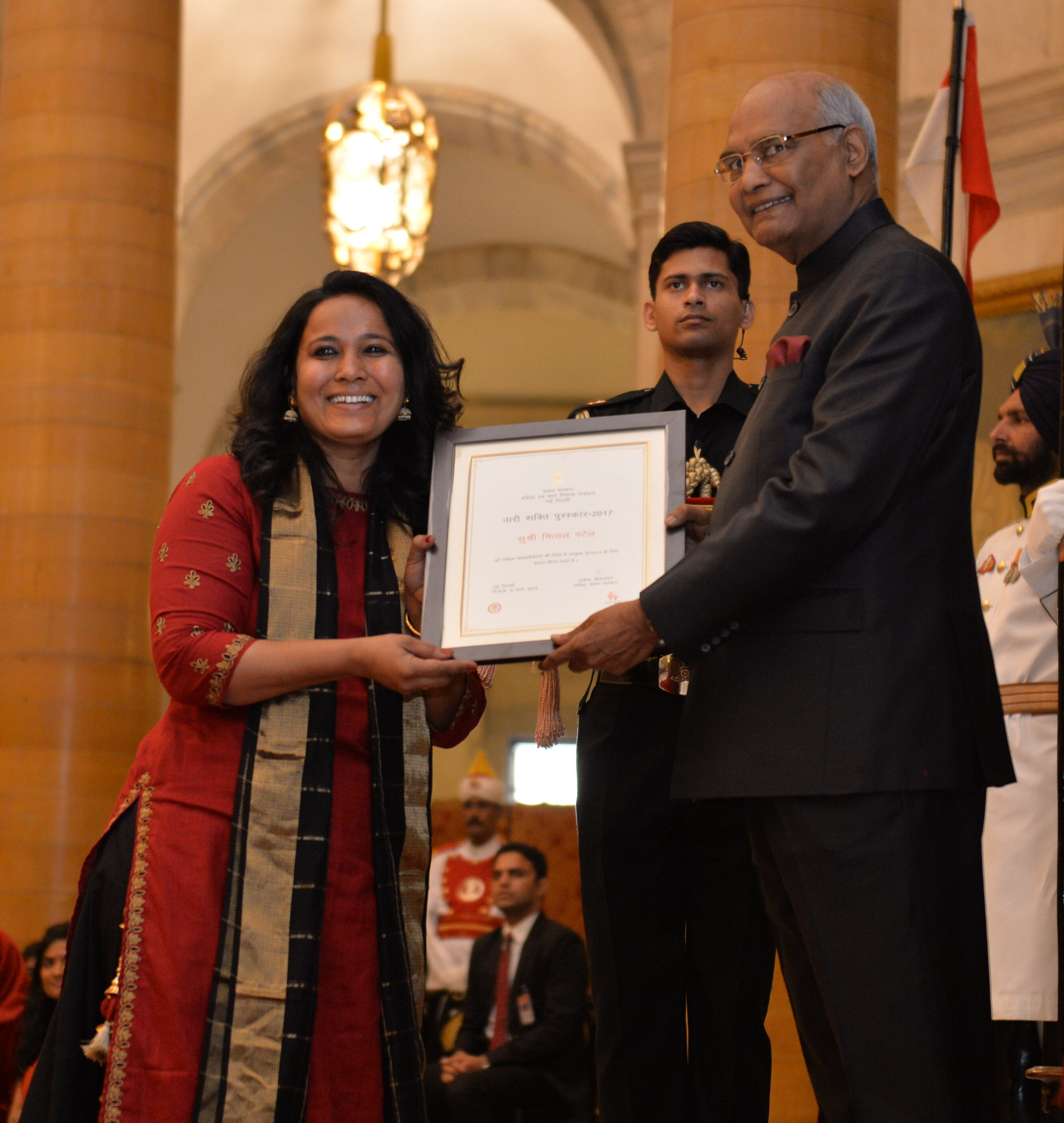
- Mittal Patel (left)
- Born: 13 January 1981 (age 45); Shankhalpur, Becharaji, Gujarat
- Occupations: Indian Social and Environmental Activist
- Organization(s): Vicharta Samuday Samarthan Manch (VSSM), Vimukt Foundation (VF)
- Known for: Founded VSSM
- Spouse: Maulik Patel
- Awards: Real Heroes Award, Nari Shakti Puraskar
- Website: www.vssmindia.org www.vimuktfoundation.org

Mittal Patel is an Indian social and environmental activist, known for her work with marginalized and nomadic communities in Gujarat. She is the founder of Vicharta Samuday Samarthan Manch (VSSM), an organization working on social justice, education, livelihood support, environmental sustainability, and community development.

== Early life ==
Patel was born c. 1981 in Sankhalpur village, in the Mehsana district of Gujarat. Both her parents worked in animal husbandry. She married and had one daughter. She took a BA in physics before graduating with a PhM in journalism at Gujarat University in Ahmedabad.

== Career ==
In 2006, she began to work with indigenous peoples. Four years later, she founded Vicharta Samuday Samarthan Manch (VSSM), an organization dedicated to supporting nomads. She worked with the Bawa, Gadaliya, Kangasiya, Meer, Nathwadee, Salat and Saraniya tribes, helping people to get married, set up schools, assert land rights and claim identification papers. The Government of Gujarat had by 2016 issued 60,000 voting card to indigenous peoples. The VSSM acts as a bank, lending money to individuals and runs two hostels in Ahmedabad for over 700 children. Building upon the connections fostered by the VSSM, the Kalupur Co-operative Bank has given microfinance loans of Rs 50,000 to 100 indigenous peoples in order to buy housing and also issued loans of up to Rs 25,000 to small businesses.

Gujarat has 28 nomadic tribes and 12 denotified tribes. These tribes have traditionally worked as knife sharpeners, haberdashers, snake-charmers and rope-walkers.

Patel engaged with members of the Dafer community, who were commonly regarded as criminals after being labelled as such under the British Raj. She worked to help them integrate into broader society. There are between 45 and 50 Dafer communities (known as Danga) in Gujarat, with a population of 18,000. By 2018, 90 per cent of the indigenous peoples of Gujarat had become citizens of India. However, Patel was still compelled to organize actions against lynch mobs which targeted tribal people. The following year, Patel was appointed to a board alongside Otaram Dewasi and under NITI Aayog which was intended to suggest welfare measures for indigenous peoples. In 2020, Patel published a book entitled Surnama vinana Maanvio. She has also revived more than 87 Gujarati lakes.

=== Vicharta Samuday Samarthan Manch ===
In 2010, Patel founded Vicharta Samuday Samarthan Manch (VSSM) with a small team. The organization has since grown to over 200 members and operates across Gujarat. Key programs of VSSM include providing legal documentation, education, livelihood support, housing, water conservation, and environmental initiatives.

=== Government positions ===
- Member of the Cheetah Task Force, National Tiger Conservation Authority.
- Advisor to the Startup and Innovation Policy Advisory Committee of the Dr. Babasaheb Ambedkar Open University.

== Awards and recognition ==
- Mittal Patel's activism for human rights was recognised with the Nari Shakti Puraskar. She was presented with the award on International Women's Day, 8 March 2018, by President Ram Nath Kovind.
- Social Changemaker of the Year (2025) – Conferred by BetterIndia.
- Climate Change Award (2021–22) – Conferred by the Government of Gujarat Department of Climate Change in December 2023 for significant contributions to environmental sustainability.
- Nari Shakti Puraskar (2018) – Conferred with the Nari Shakti Award by the President of India on 8th March 2018. She has also been honoured with the Nari Shakti Award by the Government of Gujarat for her dedicated efforts towards empowering the Nomadic and De-notified Tribes.

== Publications ==
Patel has published multiple books, and is also a regular columnist in Gujarati newspapers such as NavGujarat Samay, Phulchhab, Gujarat Guardian, and Gujarat Mitra.

- Sarnama Vinana Manavio (2019, 2022)
- …Pan Ahinyaan Sukh Nathi Aavtun! (2022)
- Ine Jakaro Kem Devay? (2023)
- Jal Khutya? (2025)
