= Pratiksha Apurv =

Indian painter

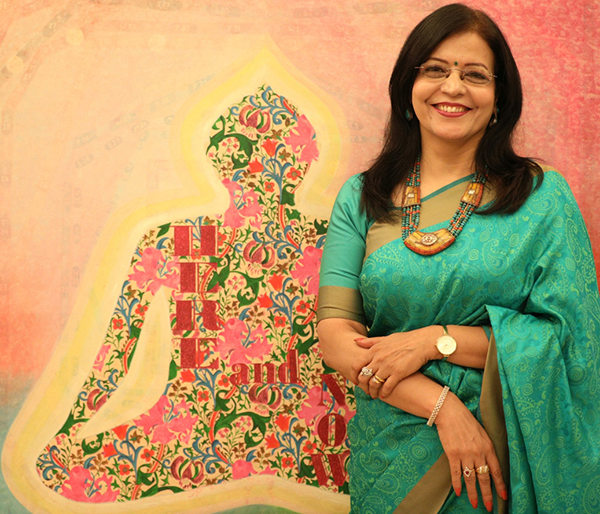
- The artist with her painting Here and Now
- Born: Madhya Pradesh, India
- Occupations: Painter, Columnist, Author
- Awards: National award

Pratiksha Apurv is an Indian painter, whose work is based on her uncle Bhagwan Shree Rajneesh (Osho)' teachings. Pratiksha Apurv listens to Osho's discourse and lives by vision. It is like experimenting Osho's vision on herself. That experience is her own truth which inspires her to paint. She is considered as the only artist in the world, who is giving shape to Osho's vision on the canvas. These works are not byproduct of discourses but born out of her experiences on her body, mind, heart and being. Before moving to painting, she was a successful fashion designer. Apurv won the National Award 2015-16 given by the Lalit Kala Akademi, Ministry of Culture for her painting 'Cosmic Balance', and has exhibited her artwork across the country. Her artwork has featured in books and magazines, and in 2018 she wrote and illustrated her own book, The Mystic and Her Colours.

== Early life ==
Pratiksha Apurv was born in Madhya Pradesh, India, the niece of Osho Rajneesh, founder of the Rajneesh movement. Her father Vijay Bharti is his younger brother. She took sannyas at the age of 11 and attended the Osho ashram in Pune. In 1982, she moved to Rajneeshpuram in the United States.

== Career ==
In 1987 Apurv launched the Oshonik label, eventually designing clothes for Atal Bihari Vajpayee, Vinod Khanna, Amjad Ali Khan, Hansraj Hans, Kapil dev, Zakir Hussain and others. She also writes a regular column in The Speaking Tree, a spiritual publication of The Times of India. In 2003 she retired from dress design and taught herself to paint.

Her first solo show was inaugurated by former Prime Minister Atal Bihari Vajpayee. and the second series of Spiritual Odyssey exhibitions at NCPA Mumbai, was inaugurated by Mrs. Nita Ambani (Reliance foundation)and praised by critics.

In one of her exhibitions at lalit Kala Academy, New Delhi, Apurv launched her Upanishad Collection. Former national Security advisor Brajesh Mishra inaugurated the show.

In March 2010, her exhibition at L&P Hutheesing Visual art centre, was inaugurated by Gujarat Chief Minister Narendra Modi. In 2010, her painting, 'Whirling' was used for the cover of the book Introducing New Age Islam, released during the UN Human rights meeting in Geneva.

Indian Council for Cultural Relations (ICCR) magazine "Indian Horizons" has featured Images of 34 paintings for their special issue (Oct–Dec, 2011) published in March 2012. The paintings are used as illustrations in the magazine for "Vedanta & Spirituality".

Some of her paintings appeared in Vikram Chopra's book Shakespeare: The Indian Icon published in 2011. She was also a member of a jury for 'Swedish Innovations - Indian Interpretations' photo contest that was organised by Embassy of Sweden in 2012 at New Delhi.

Apurv's paintings were selected for the 'Soul of Asia' section of the 44th International Film Festival of India IFFI held in November 2013 in Goa. The show was inaugurated by Manish Tewari and Susan Sarandon. The festival also screened the film Master of the Masters featuring 22 of her paintings.

Her Mystical Moments series of paintings at the Rashtrapati Bhawan Museum was inaugurated by Prime Minister Narendra Modi on July 25, 2016 and hosted by The president of India Pranab Mukherjee.

A book The Mystic and Her Colours, a collection of her columns from The Speaking Tree illustrated by her paintings, was published in September 2018.

== Meditative art ==
Her paintings include religious imagery, spirituality icons, and abstract symbols. Apurv has also contemporary figures silhouetted in black against a colourful background featuring people engaged in various forms of social interaction like dancing with one another or engrossed in quiet, intimate dialogue. Some of her paintings have strong overtones of Tibetan influences such as "Jalpari," which has a colourful mythological figure rising out of the water against an elaborately detailed sky. A figure prays behind a finely detailed fretwork screen in the painting 'Devotion' and a tranquil Buddha head with rays of light radiating around it appears in 'Illuminations'.

The inner sound of Aum had undoubtedly transformed Pratiksha and 6 paintings were born out of that experience.

1. Sound of inner being
2. Heart beat of absolute
3. Sound of silence
4. Soundless sound
5. Serenity
6. Aura[20]

The third eye is just a space between the two eyes and it is not the part of body organs. Once this space was realized, she expressed it through colors and now the canvas is titled as Beyond the senses. The remarkable thing about Pratiksha is that she uses her mind as a friendly tool to assist and go beyond the mind in three stages-concentrations, meditation and mindfulness which is reflected in geometrical patterns in the painting titled as "Journey of the mind". While working on self hypnosis she went in all layers of consciousness and her expression in painting is titled as "Beyond psychology 1". Once her inner world is illuminated, she radiates light and spread it around. Its physical manifestation can be seen in the painting titled as The miracle of transmission. The energy is very powerful at the base centre. As soon as it is witnessed, it can be transcended and reach cosmic super consciousness. This phenomenon is reflected in her 9 paintings 1. Ultimate consciousness 2. From sex to superconciousness 3. The inner reality 4. Transcendence 5. From roots to flowering 6. Rising to the Magnificent Beyond 7. Witnessing-The key to Mastering Moods 8. Beyond time 9. The Divine Yogin. She has expressed the true definition of Yoga through her painting. Yoga is all about inner discipline- Now the discipline as explained by Maharshi Patanjali in first Shloka of Yogsutra. She expressed this phenomenon in two paintings "Patanjali -The great inner scientist" and "The open door". After expererincing the moment of being total and dissolving oneself completely in the love of the Divine Pratiksha Apurv painted more than a dozen painting. 1. Leela- The play of Divine energy 2. Love- The Divine drunkenness 3. Inner joy 4. Celebration is silence 5. Whirling 6. Whirling-1 7. Prayer: in gratitude 8. Power of love 9.Devotion 10. Divine love 11.Ectacy of flowering 12.In praise of the lord. 13. The whirling dervish 14.Divine grace 15. Divinity of love.

== Themes ==
In the last nineteen years since the launch of her Solo Exhibition 'Spiritual Odyssey' Pratiksha has worked on various aspects of Meditative Art. Some of her themes include: Right Mindfulness, Seven Energy Centres, Seven Layers of Consciousness, Five Senses, Sixth Sense and Beyond Senses. She has also done a series on tantra, yoga, five elements and optical illusion. Although, volumes have been written on the subject of 'Life and Death', Pratiksha has tried to depict this important subject through Colours. Her paintings also reflect the messages of Gautam Buddha, Krishna, Meera, Kabir, Nanak, Shiva, Ram, Sufis, Jesus, Islam, Zen, Bhagwat Gita and the Upanishads.

== Achievements ==
She won the National Award 2015-16 for her painting titled Cosmic Balance. Her work was also part of National Exhibition in Lucknow on March 10, 2016 that was inaugurated by Ram Naik, Governor of Uttar Pradesh. Her paintings were selected for India's national exhibition organised by Lalit Kala Akademi, New Delhi for the 52nd, 53rd and 54th National Exhibition.

== Exhibition ==
=== Solo shows ===
- "Spiritual Odyssey" AIFACS Gallery New Delhi, Feb 2007.
- "Spiritual Odyssey" NCPA Gallery Mumbai, September 2007.
- "Spiritual Odyssey" Lalit Kala Akademi, March 2008.
- "Spiritual Odyssey" Chitrakala Parishath, Bangalore, December 2008.
- "Spiritual Odyssey" Lalit Kala Akademi, Chennai, January 2009.
- "Spiritual Odyssey" L&P Hutheesing Visual art centre, Ahmedabad, March 2010.
- "Spiritual Odyssey" Allure Art gallery, Vadodara, April 2010.
- "Reflections" Lalit Kala Akademi, New Delhi, November–December 2010.
- "Reflections" ICCR, New Delhi, July 2011.
- "Selected works of Pratiksha" Punjab Kala Bhawan, Chandigarh, April 2013.
- "Divine Art" INOX, IFFI Goa, November 2013
- "Mystical Moments" Rashtrapati Bhawan Museum, New Delhi, July 2016
- "Mystical Moments" Lalit Kala Akademi, New Delhi, March 2018

== See also ==
- Rajneesh movement
