= Second Lives =

2008 book by Tim Guest

- Author: Tim Guest
- Language: English
- Genre: Non-fiction
- Publisher: Random House
- Publication date: 2007
- ISBN: 9781400065356

Second Lives: A Journey Through Virtual Worlds is a 2007 book about virtual community, written by author Tim Guest.

== Contents ==
Tim Guest examines life in virtual worlds. He finds some people who claim to have found love and friendship without ever having really met, he looks at companies who have used these virtual worlds to do business including IBM and the Metaverse evangelist Ian Hughes, also the developers Rivers Run Red, who have pioneered virtual worlds for brands and business use. Guest looks at the US military's virtual model to train its warriors to fight, and looks at virtual worlds in South Korea. Guest is worried about the 'dark side' of these worlds with their criminals, mafiosos, prostitutes, hackers and terrorists. This book seeks to address the question: are virtual worlds life enhancing or mere escapism. Guest in his virtual personality, 'Errol Mysterio', explores these worlds.

== Film adaptation ==
In 2007, director David Fincher worked with screenwriter Peter Straughan to adapt Second Lives to the big screen. With interest from Brad Pitt and Sacha Baron Cohen, the adaptation was rumored to be about the book's main protagonist, a zany Second Life resident who drove founder Philip Rosedale bonkers.

== Bibliography ==
- Tim Guest (2008) Second Lives: A Journey Through Virtual Worlds, Hutchinson
