= Satish Chandra Mittal =

Indian historian

Satish Chandra Mittal (born 1938), is a retired professor of modern Indian history, Kurukshetra University, Haryana, India, and national president of the All India Itihas Sankalan Yojana, a subsidiary of RSS, a Hindu-nationalist organisation. He has authored more than 36 books including Freedom Movement in Punjab (1905-1929), Sources of National Movement (1919-1920) and Haryana: A Historical Perspective (1761-1966). He was one of the six people who demanded a ban on Wendy Doniger’s book The Hindus: An Alternative History.

== Selected publications ==
=== Books ===
- Freedom Movement in Punjab, 1905-29. Concept Publishing, 1977. OCLC 3801970
- India distorted: A study of British historians on India. M.D. Publications, 1995. ISBN 9788175330795
- A selected annotated bibliography on freedom movement in India : Punjab and Haryana, 1858-1947. Aditya Prakashan, New Delhi, 1992. ISBN 9788185179797
- Haryana, a historical perspective. Atlantic Publishers & Distributors, New Delhi, 1986. OCLC 14055795
- Modern India : a textbook for class XII. National Council of Educational Research and Training, 2003. ISBN 9788174501295

=== Papers ===
- "The Political Influence on Punjab Census; A Case Study of The Role of The British in the Growth of Hindu-Sikh Tension", Proceedings of the Indian History Congress. Vol. 50, Golden Jubilee Session (1989), pp. 444–454.

== See also ==
- James Talboys Wheeler
