= Philip Toelkes =

American lawyer

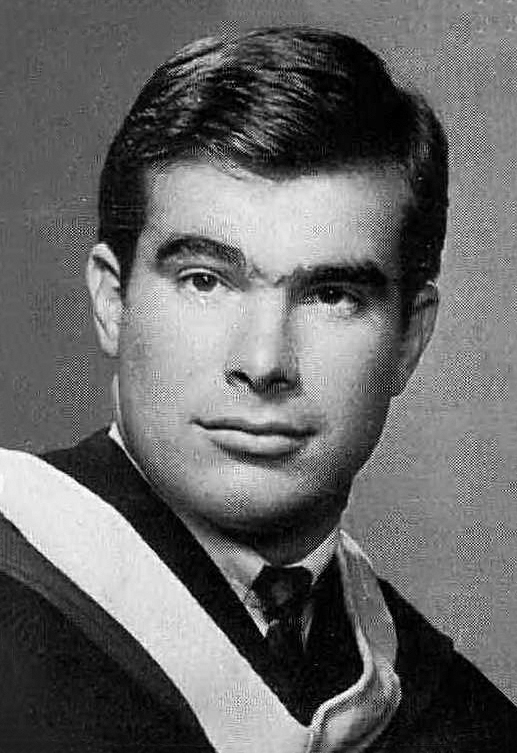
- University yearbook portrait, 1967

2nd Mayor of Rajneeshpuram
- In office 1985–1986
- Leader: Rajneesh
- Preceded by: David Berry Knapp
- Succeeded by: Position abolished

Personal details
- Born: Philip John Toelkes Tigard, Oregon, U.S.
- Education: University of San Francisco (BA, JD)
- Website: nirentoelkes.com

Philip John Toelkes, also known as Swami Prem Niren and Philip Niren Toelkes, is an American lawyer and follower of Rajneesh who served as the second mayor of Rajneeshpuram from 1985 until the commune's disbandment in 1986. He also served as the personal lawyer of Bhagwan Shree Rajneesh.

== Early life and education ==
Toelkes was born in Tigard, Oregon and raised Catholic. He earned an undergraduate degree from the University of San Francisco and a Juris Doctor from the University of San Francisco School of Law.

== Career ==
Toelkes began his career as an attorney in Los Angeles, working with the Manatt Law Firm which was, at the time, the fastest-growing law firm in the U.S. After traveling to Pune and meeting with Rajneesh, he left his job and relocated to the newly established Rajneeshpuram commune in Wasco County, Oregon. From 1981 to 1990, Toelkes served as Rajneesh's personal attorney, until Rajneesh's death.

Toelkes was the director of the Rajneesh Legal Services Corporation and later became the mayor of Rajneeshpuram, succeeding Krishna Deva. After his first marriage ended, he remarried Ma Prem Isabel, who was the director of public relations for Rajneeshpuram. No legal charges were ever filed against Toelkes, he continues to practice law, and remains loyal to Osho.

He is featured in Wild Wild Country, a Netflix documentary series about the controversial Indian guru, and he has written an account of the legal aspects of the cases against Osho and Rajneeshpuram brought by the U.S. Government.
