= Ian Hughes (footballer, born 1946) =

Welsh footballer

Personal information
- Full name: Robert Ian Hughes
- Date of birth: 17 March 1946 (age 80)
- Place of birth: Cefn Mawr, Wales
- Position: Winger

Senior career*
Years	Team	Apps	(Gls)
- Oswestry Town
1966–1967	Wrexham	9	(3)
1967–1968	Bradford Park Avenue	13	(0)
- Rhyl
- * Club domestic league appearances and goals

Robert Ian Hughes (born 17 March 1946) is a Welsh former professional footballer who played as a winger. He made appearances in the English Football League for Wrexham and Bradford Park Avenue. He also played for Oswestry Town and Rhyl.
