= Alok Mittal =

Indian police officer

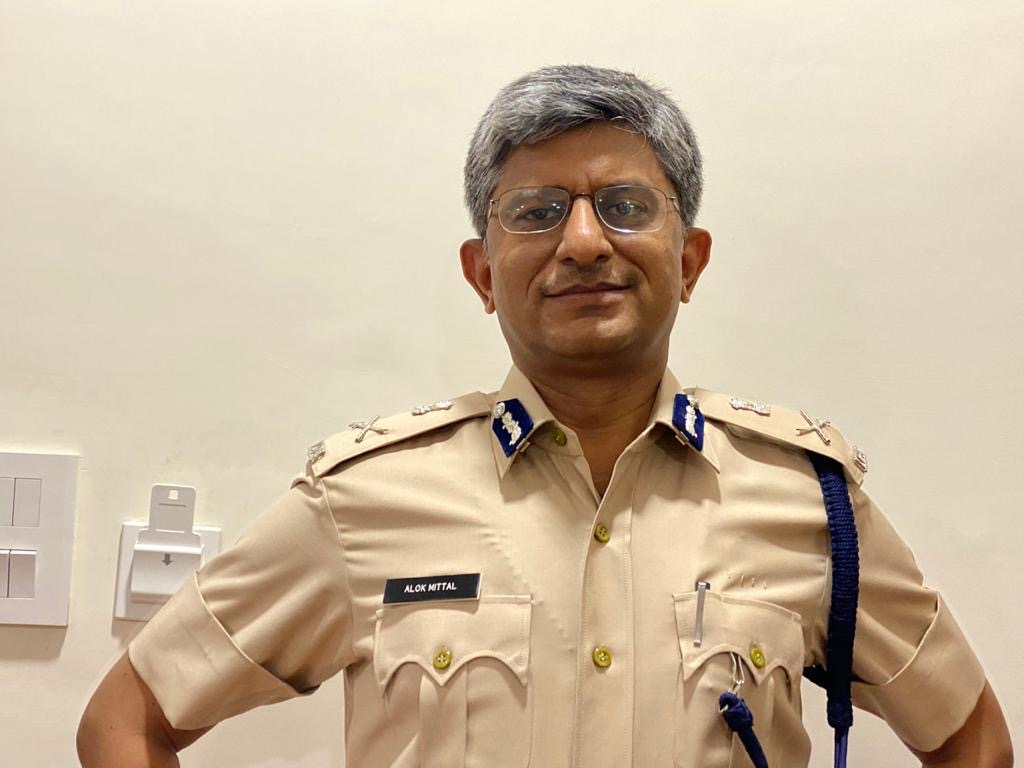
Alok Mittal, Director General of Police

Alok Mittal (born 1969) is an Indian police officer, serving as Director General, Bureau of Police Research & Development, Ministry of Home Affairs, Government of India. He belongs to the 1993 batch of the IPS (Haryana Cadre) and has held several important positions throughout his career.

== Posts ==
Mittal joined the Indian Police Service in 1993 and has held several important assignments in Haryana and at the national level.

- SP Panchkula, December 1996 – October 1999 (2 years 11 months)
- SP CBI Economic Offences Wing & Cyber Crime Cell, Central Bureau of Investigation, New Delhi November 2001 – November 2005 (4 years)
- SSP Panipat, Haryana December 2005 – January 2007 (1 year 2 months)
- SSP Faridabad, Haryana January 2007 – June 2008 (1 year 6 months), Mittal started the first Indian all-women PCR in Faridabad, Haryana in 2007.
- SSP Rohtak, June 2008 – June 2009 (1 year 1 month)
- Joint Commissioner of Police, Gurgaon, June 2009 – October 2011 (2 years 5 months), Mittal's public centric initiatives to improve policing in Gurgaon received wide appreciation from all sections of society.
- Inspector General of Police, Rohtak Range, Haryana Police, October 2011 – February 2013 (1 year 5 months) Rohtak Area, India
- Commissioner of Police Gurgaon, Feb 2013- Nov 2014. He started the Cyber Safe Campaign in Gurgaon, along with Rakshit Tandon, a cyber security expert. It was conducted in two phases in July–August, 2013 and November, 2014 to educate students, teachers and parents in schools and colleges about the various problems related to cyber security. The campaign covered more than 60 schools and around 60,000 students and reached 4,000 teachers/parents. A summer internship program with the Cyber Crime Cell of Gurgaon Police was also started as part of the Cyber Safe Campaign, the campaign saw engineering and management graduates from various colleges/universities spread in all parts of the country.
- IGP Law & Order, Haryana Nov 2014-April 2015
- Inspector General, National Investigation Agency, April 2015-June 2020 (5 year 2 months) New Delhi, India
- ADGP, CID Chief Haryana, Intelligence Head, July 2020-December 2024 (4 year 5 months) New Delhi, India
- Director General, State Vigilance & Anti Corruption Bureau Haryana, December 2024-December 2025 (1 year 1 month) Panchkula, Haryana
- Director General of Prisons & Haryana Police Housing Corporation Haryana, December 2025-June 2026 (7 months) Panchkula, Haryana
- Director General, Bureau of Police Research & Development, Ministry of Home Affairs, Government of India, since July 2026.

== Recognition ==
- Indian Police Medal for Meritorious Service in 2009.
- President's Police Medal for Distinguished Services in 2016.
- Union Home Minister's Asadharan Aasuchana Kushalata Padak 2021 for excellent intelligence service.
