= James Talboys Wheeler =

Bureaucrat-historian of the British Raj

James Talboys Wheeler (December 1824 in Oxford – 13 January 1897 in Ramsgate) was a bureaucrat-historian of the British Raj.

== Early life and career ==
James Talboys Wheeler was born in Oxford 22 or 23 December 1824. His parents were James Luft Wheeler; a bookseller, and Anne Ophelia; whose father was the publisher and translator David Alphonso Talboys and himself the son of a bookseller. James was privately educated and then attempted an unsuccessful career as a publisher and bookseller before venturing into authorship of student handbooks. He worked for Henry George Bohn as a sub-editor, between 1845 and 1847, and spent some time working as a clerk in the War Office during the Crimean War.

== Career abroad ==
In 1858, he determined to develop his literary talents by becoming editor of the Madras Spectator in India. Later in that year he was appointed professor of Moral and Mental Philosophy at Madras Presidency College, and during his four years in that position his interest in Hindu customs was piqued as a consequence of his contact with Indian students. He believed that the Europeans in India were largely ignorant of the Hindu perspective on family life.

Wheeler developed his interests to become, in the words of S. C. Mittal, a "bureaucrat-historian", of whom William Wilson Hunter and Alfred Comyn Lyall are other examples. In 1860, while still holding his chair at the college, he was employed by the Raj government in Madras, from which came his Madras in the Olden Time, a history based on government records that was published in 1861, and was based at least in part on columns previously published by the Indian Statesman. In the following year he moved to Calcutta as an Assistant Secretary in the Foreign Department, and in 1867 he was appointed Secretary to the Records Commission as an official appreciation of his works. While holding these two offices, he produced various summary reports relating to the history and politics of countries that bordered on British India for the government, and also some memoranda on topics such as vernacular literature and the amirs of Sindh that were well received. He also engaged himself, in his leisure time, with the compilation of his four-volume History of India, which was published between 1867 and 1881. This is sometimes described as a five-volume work: the last volume of the series was published in two parts.

In 1870 he moved to Rangoon in Burma, where he held office as Secretary to the Chief Commissioner of British Burma.

According to Oxford Dictionary of National Biography (ODNB), in an article originally written in 1899 by Stephen Wheeler and later revised by David Washbrook in 2004, he had a three-year furlough in England between 1873 and 1876 and then returned to Calcutta, where he produced further reports based on records held by government departments and also an official history of the Imperial Assemblage (the Delhi Durbar) that took place in 1877. He was given permission to publish these later works, which had not been the case with his earlier official reports, he was "one of the first historians of British India to rely primarily on documentary sources. Although his perspectives were unequivocally imperialist, his work continues to be consulted for its empirical strengths."

Mittal agrees with the ODNB, saying that Wheeler was

... not an original thinker or a genius professional historian but [...] a compiler, a record-keeper and a good editor. His History of India ... is a great contribution in the field of historical research and interpretation. His survey of the Sanskrit literature and ancient Hindu tradition throws some new light on the concerned aspects of the India history.

However, Mittal's description of his career post-1870 differs considerably, claiming that Wheeler was occupied in Burma until 1879. There he failed to win the approval that he had enjoyed in India, possibly because he lacked basic administrative experience and possibly because of failing health due to "intemperance". He was pensioned off early, in 1879, and his subsequent proposals to produce summaries of official records were disregarded. The government also denied his request in 1888 for financial recognition, in the form of a grant or pension, for his efforts in producing the History of India series.

== Death ==
In contradiction to Mittal, the ODNB says that Wheeler retired in 1891. He died in Ramsgate on 13 January 1897. He had married Emily Roe on 15 January 1852, in Cambridge, and the couple had several children.

== Bibliography ==
Aside from the works listed below, and his unpublished reports for the government, Wheeler wrote many articles. These appeared principally in the Asiatic Quarterly Review, the Calcutta Review, the Indian Statesman and the Saturday Evening Englishman.

- Wheeler, James Talboys (1852) [1848]. An Analysis and Summary of Herodotus (Second ed.). London: Henry G. Bohn.
- Wheeler, James Talboys (1852) [1849]. An Analysis and Summary of Old Testament History and the Laws of Moses (Third ed.). Oxford: J. L. Wheeler.
- Wheeler, James Talboys (1854). A Popular Abridgement of Old Testament History. London: Arthur Hall, Virtue, & Co.
- Wheeler, James Talboys (1854). The Geography of Herodotus. London: Longman, Brown, Green, and Longmans.
- Wheeler, James Talboys (1855) [1850]. An Analysis and Summary of Thucydides. London: Henry G. Bohn.
- Wheeler, James Talboys (1855). The Life and Travels of Herodotus in the Fifth Century Before Christ. Vol. I. London: Longman, Brown, Green, and Longmans.
- Wheeler, James Talboys (1855). The Life and Travels of Herodotus in the Fifth Century Before Christ. Vol. II. London: Longman, Brown, Green, and Longmans.
- Wheeler, James Talboys (1859) [1852]. An Analysis and Summary of New Testament History (Fifth ed.). London: Arthur Hall, Virtue, & Co.
- Wheeler, James Talboys (1861). Madras in the Olden Time. Vol. I: 1639–1702. Madras: J. Higginbotham.
- Wheeler, James Talboys (1861). Madras in the Olden Time. Vol. II: 1702–1727. Madras: J. Higginbotham.
- Wheeler, James Talboys (1862). Madras in the Olden Time. Vol. III: 1727–1748. Madras: J. Higginbotham.
- Wheeler, James Talboys (1862). Hand-book to the Cotton Cultivation in the Madras Presidency. Madras: J. Higginbotham.
- Wheeler, James Talboys (1866). Madras versus America: A Handbook to Cotton Cultivation. New York: Virtue and Yorston.
- Wheeler, James Talboys (1864). Early Travels in India: Being Reprints of Rare and Curious Narratives of Old Travellers in India in the Sixteenth and Seventeenth Centuries. Calcutta: R. Lepage & Co.
- Wheeler, James Talboys (1867). The History of India: The Vedic Period and the Maha Bharata. Vol. I. London: N. Trübner & Co.
- Wheeler, James Talboys (1868). Summary of Affairs of the Government of India in the Foreign Department from 1864 to 1869. Calcutta: Office of Superintendent of Government Printing.
- Wheeler, James Talboys (1869). The History of India: The Ramayana and the Brahmanic Period. Vol. II. London: Trübner & Co.
- Wheeler, James Talboys (1871). Journal of a Voyage up the Irrawaddy to Mandalay and Bhamo. London: Trübner & Co.
- Wheeler, James Talboys (1874). The History of India: Hindu, Buddhist, Brahmanical Revival. Vol. III. London: Trübner & Co.
- Wheeler, James Talboys (1876). The History of India: Mussulman Rule. Vol. IV, Part I. London: Trübner & Co.
- Wheeler, James Talboys (1877). History of the Imperial Assemblage at Delhi. London: Longmans, Green, Reader, and Dyer.
- Wheeler, James Talboys (1878). Early Records of British India: A History of the English Settlements in India. London: Trübner & Co.
- Wheeler, James Talboys (1881). The History of India: Moghul Empire — Aurangzer. Vol. IV, Part II. London: Trübner & Co.
- Wheeler, James Talboys (1881). Tales from Indian History: Being the Annals of India Retold in Narratives. London: W. Thacker & Co.
- Wheeler, James Talboys (1884). A Short History of India and of the Frontier States of Afghanistan, Nipal, and Burma. London: Macmillan & Co.
- Wheeler, James Talboys (1886). India under British Rule from the Foundation of the East India company. London: Macmillan & Co.
- Wheeler, James Talboys (1888). College History of India: Asiatic and European. London: Macmillan & Co.
