= Ian Hughes (footballer, born 1961) =

English footballer

Personal information
- Full name: Ian James Hughes
- Date of birth: 24 August 1961 (age 65)
- Place of birth: Sunderland, England
- Position: Defender

Senior career*
| Years | Team | Apps | (Gls) |
| 1979–1981 | Sunderland | 1 | (0) |
| 1981–1982 | Barnsley | 0 | (0) |
| 1982–198? | Seaham Colliery Welfare Red Star | | |
- * Club domestic league appearances and goals

Ian James Hughes (born 24 August 1961) is an English former professional footballer who played as a defender for Sunderland.
