= Rajnish Kumar (chemical engineer) =

Indian engineer (born 1977)

- Born: Madhya Pradesh, India
- Education: Indian Institute of Science; The University of British Columbia
- Known for: Studies on clathrate hydrates, clathrates and carbon capture and storage
- Awards: 2016 NASI-Scopus Young Scientist Award; 2018 Clarivate Highly Cited Researcher Award; 2022 Shanti Swarup Bhatnagar Prize
- Scientific career
- Fields: Chemical engineering
- Workplaces: National Chemical Laboratory; Indian Institute of Technology Madras

Rajnish Kumar is an Indian chemical engineer who specialises in clathrate hydrates and gas hydrates. He is a professor in the department of chemical engineering at the Indian Institute of Technology Madras. He received the Shanti Swarup Bhatnagar Prize for Science and Technology in 2022.

In 2018, Clarivate Analytics named him as one of the World's Most Influential Scientific Minds and a Highly Cited Researcher in the field of engineering. He received the NASI–Scopus Young Scientist Award for the year 2016.
