= David Berry Knapp =

American former businessman and disciple of Rajneesh

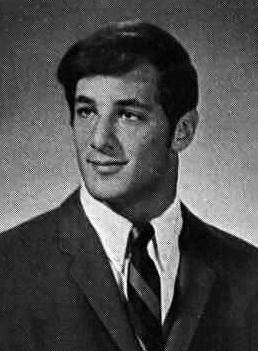
- High school yearbook portrait, 1967

Mayor of Rajneeshpuram
- In office August 11, 1982 – September 15, 1985
- Leader: Rajneesh
- Preceded by: Position established
- Succeeded by: Philip Toelkes

Personal details
- Born: 1948 (age 77–78)
- Education: University of Southern California (BS); Lone Mountain College (MS)

David Berry Knapp, also known as Krishna Deva (born 1948), is an American former disciple of Rajneesh and was mayor of Rajneeshpuram from August 11, 1982, to September 15, 1985.

== Early life and education ==
Knapp was raised in Chicago and Highland Park, Illinois. After graduating from Highland Park High School, he earned a bachelor's degree from the University of Southern California. Knapp began a Master of Science degree program in counseling psychology at USC and completed it at Lone Mountain College.

== Career ==
After earning his counseling degree, Knapp managed a mental health facility in Los Angeles called "The Family Home." Knapp also worked as a marriage counselor, drug and alcohol counselor, and academic counselor at Santa Monica College. Knapp earned a real estate broker's license in 1977.

Knapp was introduced to the Rajneesh teachings in 1976 and stayed at the Pune ashram between 1979 and 1981. Due to his background in the real estate industry, with knowledge of municipality law and related business, he became involved with what would develop into Rajneeshpuram, a commune built in rural Wasco County, Oregon. In late 1982 he became a city official and later was named mayor of the new city. In 1985, he became an FBI informant and provided what the Bureau described as "essential" information to uncovering the criminal activities of the religious group. Knapp admitted to being involved with the 1984 Rajneeshee bioterror attack.

In 1986, he was sentenced to two years in prison after admitting to filing a false petition with the Immigration and Naturalization Service and participating in a sham marriage. Knapp entered the Federal Witness Protection Program, and after serving his prison term, he relocated to El Segundo, California, and changed back to his pre-Sannyasin name. Knapp refused to be interviewed for the documentary Wild Wild Country.
