= Ian Hughes (Australian footballer) =

Australian rules footballer

Personal information
- Full name: Ian Hughes
- Born: 29 March 1939
- Died: 30 April 1976 (aged 37)
- Height: 177 cm (5 ft 10 in)
- Weight: 68 kg (150 lb)

Playing career^{1}
Years	Club	Games (Goals)
1961–62	North Melbourne	11 (7)
- ^{1} Playing statistics correct to the end of 1962.

Ian Hughes (29 March 1939 – 30 April 1976) was an Australian rules footballer who played with North Melbourne in the Victorian Football League (VFL).
