= Rajnish Kumar Mittal =

Indian politician

- Shanty

Municipal Council Nabha Government of Punjab
- Incumbent
- Assumed office 15 May 2017
- Deputy: Ashok Kumar, Jagwinder Kaur Dhindsa
- Preceded by: Gursewak Singh(WardNo.2)
- Constituency: Nabha

Personal details
- Born: 18 September 1974 (age 52) Nabha, Punjab
- Party: Indian National Congress
- Spouse: Mamta Mittal
- Children: Mayank Mittal, Aarushi

Rajnish Kumar Mittal (born 18 September 1974) is the President of Municipal Council Nabha and an Indian politician.

== Career ==
He served as President Of Municipal Council Nabha. He was elected as the Civic Body Chief on 11 May 2017. and giving a monthly allowance to The Gaushala to control the increasing numbers of stray animals.
