= Rajnish Kumar (peace activist) =

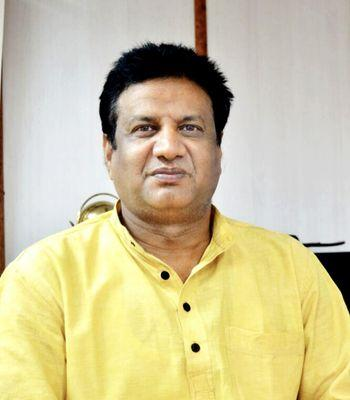
- Kumar (2015)
- Occupation: Raj Ghat and associated memorials
- Organization: All India Prohibition Council
- Known for: peace activist, gandhism

Rajnish Kumar (Devanagari: रजनीश कुमार) is President, All India Prohibition council.
