= Rajnish Kumar (politician) =

Indian politician (1960–2019)

MLA, Punjab
- In office 2012 – 2019
- Preceded by: Arunesh Kumar
- Constituency: Mukerian

Personal details
- Born: 17 August 1960
- Died: 27 August 2019 (aged 59)
- Party: Congress

Rajnish Kumar (17 August 1960 – 27 August 2019) was a politician in India. He was a member of Punjab Legislative Assembly and represented Mukerian. He was the son of former Punjab Assembly Speaker and finance minister Kewal Krishan.

== Family ==
He was the son of former Punjab Assembly Speaker and finance minister Kewal Krishan.

== Political career ==
Rajnish Kumar first unsuccessfully contested the Punjab Legislative Assembly elections in 2007 from Mukerian as a Congress candidate. During the 2012 Punjab assembly elections, Congress nominated Ajit Kumar Narang from Mukerian. Rajnish Kumar decided to contest as an independent candidate, for which he was expelled from Congress. He successfully contested and became a member of the Punjab Legislative assembly by defeating 2nd placed BJP candidate Arunesh Kumar by more than 12 thousand votes. The Congress nominee came 3rd.
