= Reactions to the occupation of the Malheur National Wildlife Refuge =

From January 2 to February 11, 2016, the headquarters of the Malheur National Wildlife Refuge (MNWR) in eastern Oregon were seized and occupied by an armed group, later called Citizens for Constitutional Freedom, affiliated with private U.S. militias and the sovereign citizen movement following an earlier peaceful march in protest of the prison sentences for ranchers Dwight Hammond and his son, Steven Hammond, who were convicted of arson on federal land, sentenced to five years' imprisonment, and sought clemency from the U.S. president. The occupation received widespread coverage from media outlets.

During the course of the occupation, statements were issued by anti-government activists and sympathetic residents, who criticized the militants' tactics. Other statements of condemnation were issued by legal scholars; federal, state, local, and tribal governments; and other organizations. In the first days, the takeover sparked a debate in the United States on the meaning of the word "terrorist" and on how the news media and law enforcement treat situations involving people of different ethnicities or religions.

== Response of authorities ==
On January 2, the Harney County Sheriff's Office reported the Oregon State Police (OSP) was "handling the incident." At the same time, a spokesperson for the Federal Bureau of Investigation (FBI) said the agency was "aware" of the situation. Later that same day, The Guardian observed that there was no visible law enforcement presence in the area. Authorities had not approached the refuge or blocked access to it.

On January 3, Harney County Sheriff David Ward issued a statement asking residents to avoid the scene and saying that the militants aimed to overthrow the government. The following day, Ward said at a press conference:

I want to directly address the people at the wildlife refuge: You said you were here to help the citizens of Harney County. That help ended when a peaceful protest became an armed and unlawful protest. The Hammonds have turned themselves in. It is time for you to leave our community. Go home, be with your own families and end this peacefully.

On the evening of January 3, Oregon State Police officials announced that a multi-agency command post would be established the following day to coordinate a response to the situation. The command post was ultimately set up at Lincoln Junior High School in Burns, Oregon, which had been closed as part of a district-wide school shutdown. U.S. Senator Ron Wyden of Oregon said that he had been briefed by the special agent in charge of the Portland, Oregon, FBI field office and added that federal, state, and local law enforcement agencies were monitoring the situation.

Also that same day, the FBI assumed the lead role in the investigation and announced that it was working with local and state authorities to seek "a peaceful resolution to the situation." The statement also read: "Due to safety considerations for both those inside the refuge as well as the law enforcement officers involved, we will not be releasing any specifics with regards to the law enforcement response." Ward later announced that the Harney County Court officially appealed for police reinforcements from the sheriffs of neighboring counties. Media outlets reported that the entrance gates to Burns Municipal Airport had been blocked by the Oregon State Police using patrol cars and armored vehicles. Despite the increased presence in and around Burns, by the end of the day on January 4, media noted that no overt police presence was visible in the 30 miles (48 km) between the town and refuge headquarters.

In taking a cautious approach, federal authorities were thought to "be mindful of prior clashes with people who did not recognize government authority," such as the Ruby Ridge incident in 1992 and the Waco siege in 1993. Those events "ended in bloodshed and became rallying cries for antigovernment militants," in contrast to similar standoffs which ended peacefully, such as the 1996 standoff with the Montana Freemen, which was resolved by extended negotiations leading to the group's surrender.

Sheriff Ward, meanwhile, told reporters that steps were underway to break the occupation and that the measures authorities were taking would "not be visible to the public." Ward also reported law enforcement personnel from nine Oregon counties had begun converging to Harney County in response to the Harney County Court's plea for help, but that they would be used to bolster courthouse security and increase the visible police presence in populated areas, rather than respond to the situation at the MNWR. Among the agencies to send personnel were the sheriffs of Wasco, Clackamas, Marion, Deschutes, Crook, Umatilla, Multnomah, Baker, and Linn Counties, along with the Burns Paiute tribal police. The sheriffs of Benton and Yamhill Counties both declined a request to deploy some of their deputies to Harney County due to what they described as existing manpower shortages. Ward assured residents on January 4 that deputies from outside the county would not "harass the good citizens of Harney County" and called on residents at a community meeting at the Harney County Fairgrounds on January 6 to form a "united front." In an interview with Oregon Public Broadcasting on January 5, he said that any resident providing supplies to the militants would only be "prolonging the situation."

== Media ==
Due to the presence of members with connections to right-wing groups such as the Three Percenters and the Oath Keepers, The Daily Beast dubbed the event "Wingnut Woodstock," referencing a militant, Dylan Anderson, who at the time would only identify himself as "Captain Moroni" (in an apparent reference to a leader in the Book of Mormon) who told media outlets, "I didn't come here to shoot I came here to die."

Pacific Standard magazine published a detailed analysis of many of the historical claims made by the militants in their public statements and in an "open letter" addressed to Harney County Sheriff David Ward. The magazine rates the claims as "libertarian fairy tales" and "revisionist" and noted "you can tell the story of Harney County as a morality tale about the evils of big government only if you leave most of it out. And so they do."

== Legal scholars ==
Lawyers and legal scholars said that the occupiers "are making demands that fly in the face of the U.S. Constitution." Erwin Chemerinsky, the dean and Distinguished Professor of Law at the University of California, Irvine School of Law, wrote:

Those who are occupying the Malheur National Wildlife Refuge in Oregon are making a legal argument that has no basis. ... Although the law on this is clear and has been for decades, the protestors continue to argue that the federal government does not have valid legal ownership of the land and must give it back to the states. It is similar to tax protestors who continue to argue that the federal income tax is unconstitutional, despite every court rightly rejecting this argument.

== Anti-government activists ==
Cliven D. Bundy, the father of Ammon and Ryan Bundy, said he was not involved in organizing the takeover of the Malheur National Wildlife Refuge headquarters and added that it was "not exactly what I thought should happen."

Asked about the incident, Mike Vanderboegh, a founder of the 3 Percenters, described the militants as "a collection of fruits and nuts," described Jon Ritzheimer as a "fool," and said Ammon Bundy had "a John Brown complex." This is a reference to the 19th century American abolitionist, who advocated the use of armed insurrection to overthrow the institution of slavery in the United States.

Stewart Rhodes, founder and leader of the Oath Keepers (of which Jon Ritzheimer was formerly a member) published an online statement one day prior to the seizure of the Malheur National Wildlife Refuge headquarters, saying, "We cannot force ourselves or our protection on people who do not want it. Dwight and Steven Hammond have made it clear, through their attorney, that they just want to turn themselves in and serve out their sentence. And that clear statement of their intent should be the end of the discussion on this." On January 15, Rhodes warned of a "bloody, brutal civil war" if the situation did not end peacefully.

== Residents ==
The New York Times reported that "Residents expressed sympathy with the underlying complaints, but elected officials criticized the armed protesters as an outsider militia group whose actions had thrown their community into a harsh national glare." Former Burns mayor Len Vohs said, "The majority of us support the Hammonds, but we don't need outsiders telling us what to do." He criticized the tactics used by the militiamen, saying that it was "anarchy" and "might is right" thinking. Harney County commissioner Dan Nichols, a neighbor of the Hammond family, made similar comments, saying that he shared frustrations about federal land policy but strongly disagreed with the involvement of armed outsiders.

In a meeting held on January 6, local residents nearly unanimously agreed they wanted the militants to leave in a show of hands to a question from Harney County Sheriff David Ward, although some expressed agreement with the concerns raised by the militia group over land use issues.

== Federal, state, local, and tribal governments ==
On January 4, White House Press Secretary Josh Earnest said, "Ultimately this is a local law enforcement matter and the FBI is monitoring the situation and offering support to local law enforcement officials." Earnest added that President Barack Obama was aware of the situation.

In a statement issued January 7, Oregon Governor Kate Brown said, "...I agree that what started as a peaceful and legal protest has become unlawful. It was instigated by outsiders whose tactics we Oregonians don't agree with. Those individuals illegally occupying the Malheur Wildlife Refuge need to decamp immediately and be held accountable."

In a January 4 press release, Harney County Judge Steven Grasty said that "[T]he Refuge is under federal jurisdiction. The County Court will stay engaged within the limits of our legal authority. ... The Hammond family is well respected in Harney County, [the] motivation of the militia groups that have descended on Harney County goes far beyond the troubles of the Hammond family as demonstrated by their actions at the Refuge." Harney County increased security at the county courthouse. Judge Grasty announced that the Bundy group would be billed the security costs incurred by the county as a result of the occupation, estimated at US$60,000 to US$70,000 per day.

The governing council of the Burns Paiute Tribe, an Indian nation in Harney County, declared the militants were endangering the tribe's history by their presence and called on them to leave. Tribal chair Charlotte Rodrique went on to explain that the United States Fish and Wildlife Service (USFWS) was the protector of traditional Burns Paiute religious and archaeological sites in the area and that the displacement of federal authorities put such locations at risk.

Oregon Representative Cliff Bentz, who represents the region in the Oregon House of Representatives, said that the outside groups do not represent Burns or Harney County, explaining, "They're trying to use the misfortune of the Hammonds to further the interests of the Bundys."

U.S. Representative Greg Walden from Oregon said in his speech on the floor of the House that "I am not condoning this takeover in any way. I want to make that clear. I don't think it is appropriate. There is a right to protest. I think they have gone too far. But I understand and hear their anger."

In a January 6 press release, the Western States Sheriffs' Association (WSSA), an organization representing 800 sheriffs in the Western United States, said its mission was to "promote the office of Sheriff and to assist our member Sheriffs on issues of mutual concern" and that it had offered Harney County Sheriff David Ward to organize out-of-state resources to send to Oregon if requested. The WSSA statement went on to note that it did not "support efforts of any individual or groups who utilize intimidation, threats or fear in order to further an agenda."

Following the end of the occupation, U.S. Representative Jason Chaffetz from Utah introduced a bill which would ban the Bureau of Land Management (BLM) and United States Forest Service (USFS) from law enforcement activities on federal lands and would transfer the responsibility to local sheriffs instead—a key demand of the militants.

== Other organizations ==
Immediately following the seizure of the refuge, the Harney County School District ordered all schools in the county to be closed for one week.

The Oregon Cattlemen's Association, while maintaining that it still supported the Hammonds, released a statement that declared it did "not support illegal activity taken against the government. This includes militia takeover of government property, such as the Malheur Wildlife Refuge."

In a January 4 statement released by the Church of Jesus Christ of Latter-day Saints, church leaders said they "strongly condemn the armed seizure of the facility and are deeply troubled by the reports that those who have seized the facility suggest that they are doing so based on scriptural principles. This armed occupation can in no way be justified on a scriptural basis."

The group People for the Ethical Treatment of Animals (PETA) launched a publicity stunt on January 5 by sending a delegation to the area to give vegan jerky to militia members.

The Audubon Society of Portland, in a written statement, said that the "occupation of Malheur by armed, out of state militia groups puts one of America's most important wildlife refuges at risk. It violates the most basic principles of the public trust doctrine and holds hostage public lands and public resources to serve the very narrow political agenda of the occupiers."

Beginning at the end of January, the Oregon Natural Desert Association (ONDA) and other Oregon-based conservation groups have begun efforts to mobilize volunteers who are interested in assisting environmental restoration at the refuge after the occupation ends. ONDA announced that more than 600 people from all over the Pacific Northwest responded to their calls.

== Other ==
On February 3, additional security officers were sent to national wildlife refuges in southern Oregon, northern California, and Nevada in response to the occupation.

=== Online response ===
The militants were mocked on social media, with commentators ridiculing the groups as "Y'all Qaeda" (in reference to American dialectical Y'all and the group al-Qaeda). Twitter hashtags such as "#OregonUnderAttack," "#VanillaISIS" (Vanilla Ice and ISIS), "#Yeehawdists" (Yeehaw and Jihadists), "#Yokelharam" (Yokel and Boko Haram), and "#Talibundy" (Taliban and the Bundy surname) were used.

After the militants asked their supporters for food and fuel donations to be sent to them, internet trolls mailed the militants numerous packages of glitter and sex paraphernalia.

=== ISIL-sympathizers ===
Some supporters of the Islamic State of Iraq and the Levant (ISIL) congratulated the takeover on social media and called for ISIL partisans in the U.S. to provide support to the militias. One self-identified ISIL supporter, using the nom de guerre Abu Adriatic Irhabi, wrote that "these rebels have military experience and are trained in warfare. They may be able to degrade and destroy their corrupt, evil, and oppressive government, or at the least severely damage its operations."

=== Ursula K. Le Guin's letter ===
Writer Ursula K. Le Guin, a resident of Oregon, wrote in a letter to the editor to The Oregonian that "Ammon Bundy and his bullyboys aren't trying to free federal lands, but to hold them hostage. I can't go to the Malheur refuge now, though as a citizen of the United States, I own it and have the freedom of it." Le Guin referred to the militants as "a flock of Right-Winged Loonybirds."

== Debates over the definition of terrorism ==
A Joint Intelligence Bulletin released by the United States Department of Homeland Security and the FBI on January 29 classified the militants as "domestic extremists," which they define as:

[I]ndividuals located in the United States who seek to advance political or social goals, wholly or in part through force or violence, in violation of federal law. Note: the mere advocacy of political or social positions, use of strong rhetoric, or generalized philosophic embrace of violent tactics may not constitute extremism and may be constitutionally protected.

The occupation sparked a public debate on whether the militants should be classified as "terrorists," and some commentators were critical of the government's decision to "wait out the occupiers rather than charge in with guns blazing." A number of commentators viewed the law enforcement response to the occupation as more lenient than the treatment accorded to Black Lives Matter protesters, with some terming this an example of white privilege. Others say that this is a case of the wealthy being granted special treatment, both in the media and by law enforcement, and that racial inequality is being used to distract from wider issues of social inequality.
