= Hammond arson case =

Court case in Oregon, US

- Date: 2012
- Location: Harney County, Oregon
- Cause: Arson
- Arrests: Dwight Lincoln Hammond Jr. Steven Dwight Hammond

United States v. Hammond was a court case in Oregon, United States, culminating from 20-year-long legal disputes between Harney County ranchers Dwight Lincoln Hammond Jr., 73, his son Steven Dwight Hammond, 46, and federal officials. In 2012, both Hammonds were charged with several counts in relation to two fires in 2001 and 2006, and eventually convicted of two counts of arson on federal land. Knowing they would face the statutory minimum of five years, the men waived their right to appeal these convictions in exchange for dismissal of several unresolved charges. After this mid-trial agreement was entered, the Hammonds were sentenced to a few months in jail, which they served. In 2015, the United States Court of Appeals for the Ninth Circuit vacated these sentences because they were shorter than the statutory mandatory minimum. The Ninth Circuit remanded to the district court for resentencing. The district court subsequently re-sentenced both Hammonds to the mandatory minimum of five years in prison, with credit for time served.

By late 2015, the Hammond case had attracted the attention of Nevada activists Ammon and Ryan Bundy, who planned a protest against the re-sentencing, though the Hammonds rejected their assistance. However, the protest still went into effect on January 2, 2016, and resulted in the Bundys and associates staging a 40-day armed occupation of the headquarters area of the Malheur National Wildlife Refuge.

On July 10, 2018, U.S. President Donald Trump issued full pardons to Dwight and Steven Hammond.

== Background ==
=== Location ===
Harney County is a rural county in eastern Oregon. The county seat is the city of Burns. Although it is one of the largest counties by area in the United States, its population is only about 7,700, and cattle outnumber people 14-to-1. About 75 percent of the county's area is federal land, variously managed by the United States Bureau of Reclamation (USBR), the Bureau of Land Management (BLM), the United States Fish and Wildlife Service (USFWS), and the United States Forest Service (USFS). Besides ranching and farming, forestry and manufacturing are important industries in the county.

The Malheur National Wildlife Refuge, located in Harney County, was established in 1908 by President Theodore Roosevelt, a conservationist. Located in the Pacific Flyway, and currently encompassing 187,757 acres (760 km^{2}), it is "one of the premiere sites for birds and birding in the U.S.," according to the Audubon Society of Portland. Tourism, especially birding, injects US$15 million into the local economy annually.

=== Cattle ranching tensions in Harney County ===
Cattle ranching in Harney County predates the 1908 establishment of the Malheur National Wildlife Refuge, with some cattle trails, including those used by the Hammond family, dating back to the 1870s. Disputes between cattle ranchers and the federal government over management of the Malheur National Wildlife Refuge have gone on for "generations" and the situation has regularly deteriorated to taunts and threats directed at federal officials from ranchers since at least the early 1970s.

In an effort to address concerns of neighboring landowners and interests, the completion of a 15-year management plan for the refuge heavily involved various stakeholders, including ranchers, in its development process. The plan was completed in 2013 and won praise from some area ranchers for its collaborative approach.

In June 1994, the Malheur National Wildlife Refuge manager, Forrest Cameron, notified Dwight Hammond that his permit to graze his cattle and grow hay on the refuge was revoked. Two months later, Hammond and his son Steven obstructed the completion of a refuge boundary fence intended to keep their cattle out of the refuge's protected marsh and wetland, prompting their arrest by federal agents. The fence was needed to stop the Hammonds' cattle from moving onto the refuge after the ranchers had repeatedly violated the terms of their special permit, which limited those times when they could move their cattle across refuge property. Officials also reported that Dwight had made death threats against refuge managers in 1986, 1988, 1991, and 1994, stating, "he was going to tear his head off and shit down his neck," and that Steven Hammond also made incendiary remarks against them, calling the employees and managers, "worthless cocksuckers" and "assholes." After the arrest, locals were given the names and phone numbers of refuge employees, and encouraged to harass them. One caller threatened to wrap the Camerons’ 12-year-old boy in a shroud of barbed wire and stuff him down a well. Other callers warned his mother that she ought to move out before something "bad" happened to her family. She gathered their four children, one unable to walk, and fled to Bend, 135 miles west. The families of three other refuge employees received telephone threats after a meeting held in support of the Hammonds, where the workers' phone numbers were circulated. Businesses in Burns displayed signs warning, "This establishment doesn’t serve federal employees." Voters recalled a pair of Harney County commissioners because they wouldn’t put the county "supremacy" ordinance on the ballot or intervene against the refuge managers. Oregon's then-Congressional District 2 U.S. Representative, Robert Freeman Smith, protested the arrests to President Bill Clinton's United States Secretary of the Interior, Bruce Babbitt. In 1999 Steven started a fire, intending to burn off juniper trees and sagebrush, but the fire escaped onto BLM land. The agency reminded him of the required burn permit and that if the fires continued, there would be legal consequences.

== Arson prosecutions ==
Both Dwight and Steven Hammond later set more fires, one in 2001 and one in 2006, that would lead to eventual convictions of arson on federal land: The 2001 Hardie-Hammond fire began after hunters in the area witnessed the Hammonds illegally slaughtering a herd of deer. Less than two hours later, a fire erupted, forcing the hunters to leave the area but also intending to conceal evidence of the deer herd slaughter. Steven's nephew Dusty Hammond testified his uncle told him to "light the whole countryside on fire," and that he was "almost burned up in the fire," having to flee for his life. The Hammonds claimed they started the fire to stop invasive plants from growing onto their grazing fields. The 2006 Krumbo Butte fire started out as a wildfire, but several illegal backburns were set by the Hammonds with an intent of protecting their winter feed. The backfires were set under the cover of night, without warning the firefighters they knew were camped on the slopes above. The fires threatened to trap four BLM firefighters. One of those later confronted Dwight Hammond at the fire scene after he had moved his crews to avoid the danger. Two days later, Steven Hammond threatened to frame a BLM employee with arson if he didn't terminate the investigation. Following their release from jail on their own recognizance, a rally attended by 500 other cattle ranchers was held in Burns, Oregon in support of the Hammonds. Some charges against the Hammonds were later dropped.

=== Mid-trial pre-sentencing agreement ===
In 2012, the Hammonds were tried in federal district court on multiple charges. During a break in jury deliberations, a partial verdict was rendered finding the Hammonds not guilty on two of the charges, but convicting them on two counts of arson on federal land. Striking a plea bargain, in order to have the four remaining charges dismissed and for sentences on the two convictions to run concurrently, the Hammonds waived their rights to appeal their convictions. This was with their knowledge that the trial would proceed to sentencing where the prosecution intended to seek imposition of the mandatory five-year minimum sentences.

=== Sentencing hearing, appeals of the sentence, and re-sentencing ===
At sentencing, the federal prosecutors requested the five-year mandatory minimum under the Antiterrorism and Effective Death Penalty Act of 1996 (AEDPA). U.S. District Judge Michael Robert Hogan independently decided that sentences of that length "would shock the conscience" and would violate the constitutional prohibition on cruel and unusual punishment. On his last day on the bench before retiring, October 31, 2012, Hogan instead sentenced Dwight Hammond to three months' imprisonment and Steven Hammond to a year and a day's imprisonment, which both men served. In what was described by one source as a "rare" action, the government (represented by the United States Attorney's Office for the District of Oregon, led by U.S. Attorney Amanda Marshall) successfully appealed the sentence to the United States Court of Appeals for the Ninth Circuit. It upheld the mandatory-minimum law, writing that "given the seriousness of arson, a five-year sentence is not grossly disproportionate to the offense." The appeals court vacated the original sentence and remanded the defendants for re-sentencing. The Hammonds filed petitions for certiorari with the U.S. Supreme Court, which the court denied in March 2015. In October 2015, Chief Judge Ann Aiken re-sentenced the pair to five years in prison (with credit for time served), ordering that they return to prison on January 4, 2016.

Both of the Hammonds reported to Federal Correctional Institution, Terminal Island in California on January 4, as ordered by the court. A few days earlier, the Hammonds also paid the federal government the remaining balance on a US$400,000 court order for restitution related to the arson fires.

On January 25, it became known that Susan Hammond, the wife of Dwight Hammond, signed a document for participation in a so-called "citizen grand jury" and claimed that the paper would clear her husband of wrongdoing. The author of the paper was Joaquin Mariano DeMoreta-Folch, a Tea Party activist. The self-styled "citizens grand jury" has no legal standing, but is rather linked to the fringe sovereign citizen movement, a movement based upon conspiracy theories about the American government which rejects federal authority.

== Aftermath of re-sentencing ==
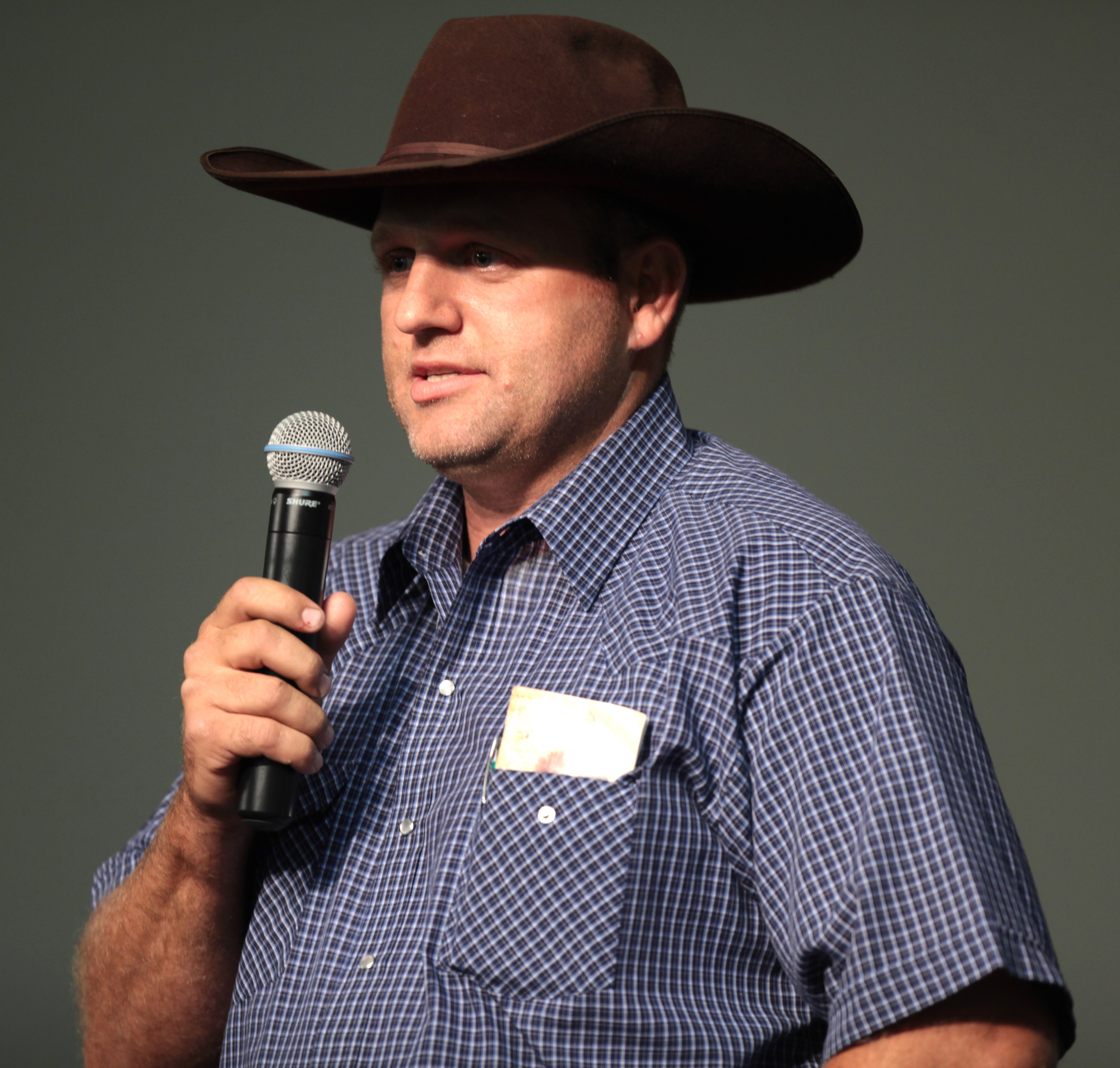
Bundy in 2014.

After the U.S. Supreme Court declined to hear the Hammonds' appeal in March 2015, the Hammonds' case returned to federal district court where they were re-sentenced to the statutory minimum of five years, with credit for time served. Meanwhile, the Oregon Farm Bureau circulated a petition seeking clemency from President Barack Obama; it had gathered more than 2,000 signatures by October 2015. Also, the Oregon Cattleman's Association, a trade group representing cattle ranchers in Oregon, established a fund to defray the Hammond's legal fees.

About this time, the Hammonds' case attracted the attention of Ammon Bundy—a former car fleet manager from Phoenix, Arizona; and the son of anti-government protester Cliven D. Bundy, the central figure of a standoff with the BLM in 2014—and Ryan Payne. In November 2015, Bundy and his associates began publicizing the Hammonds' case via social media.

Over the ensuing weeks, Bundy and Payne met for approximately eight hours with Harney County Sheriff David Ward to detail plans for what they described would be a peaceful protest in Burns, as well as also requesting the sheriff's office protect the Hammonds from being taken into custody by federal authorities. Though Ward said he sympathized with the Hammonds' plight, he declined Bundy and Payne's request. Ward then said that he subsequently received death threats by email. Unbeknownst to Ward, Bundy and Payne were simultaneously planning a takeover of the Malheur National Wildlife Refuge. By late fall, local, state, and federal law enforcement agencies had become aware that members of anti-government militias had started to relocate to Harney County, and the USFWS began circulating a photograph of Ammon Bundy with instructions for staff to "be on the lookout."

Despite several early meetings with Bundy and Payne, the Hammonds eventually rejected their offers of assistance, with Hammond attorney W. Alan Schroeder writing that "neither Ammon Bundy nor anyone within his group/organization speak for the Hammond family."

By early December 2015, Bundy and Payne had set up residence in Burns. The same month, they organized a meeting at the Harney County Fairgrounds to rally support for their efforts. At the meeting, a "committee of safety" was organized to orchestrate direct action against the Hammond sentences. According to that group's website, the Harney County Committee of Safety considers itself "a governmental body established by the people in the absence of the ability of the existing government to provide for the needs and protection of civilized society" (during the American Revolution, committees of safety were shadow governments organized to usurp authority from colonial administrators).

=== 2016 occupation of the Malheur National Wildlife Refuge ===
On January 2, 2016, an armed group affiliated with the private U.S. militia movement held a peaceful march in protest of the Hammonds' prison sentences. Afterwards, several members of the group, consisting of Bundy, Payne, Jon Ritzheimer, and armed associates separated from the protest crowd at some point during the day and proceeded to the Malheur National Wildlife Refuge, 30 miles (48 km) away. The militants settled into the refuge and set up defensive positions. On January 4, the Hammonds turned themselves in at a California federal prison facility after being convicted of arson on federal land, sentenced to five years' imprisonment, and sought clemency from the U.S. president.

Bundy said he began leading the occupation after receiving a divine message ordering him to do so. The militant group demanded that the federal government of the United States cede ownership of the refuge, and expressed willingness to engage in armed conflict. For a time, the government and police did not engage directly with the militia.

Dwight and Steven Hammond disavowed the occupation of the refuge. They voluntarily reported to begin serving the remainder of their respective prison sentences.

On January 26, Bundy and four other militants were arrested on U.S. Route 395 about 48 miles (77 km) north of the occupation. One militant was lightly wounded during the arrest, and another, Robert "LaVoy" Finicum, was shot and killed by law enforcement officers while he was reportedly reaching for his gun. Several other arrests followed, and on February 11, the occupation ended when the last four militants surrendered to police. A total of 26 people, including Bundy and Payne, were charged under federal law with a single count of felony conspiracy, though more charges may be brought in due course.

On October 27, 2016, Bundy and 6 other defendants were acquitted in Federal District Court of all charges of conspiracy and weapons violations. In August 2017, two other defendants were acquitted in Las Vegas district court on most charges, and deadlocked on the remaining charges. On January 8, 2018, a federal judge in Las Vegas dismissed all charges against Clive Bundy and his sons, Ammon and Ryan. Judge Gloria M. Navarro of Federal District Court, in a ruling from the bench, said that the government’s missteps in withholding evidence against the three Bundy family members and a supporter, Ryan W. Payne, were so grave that the indictment against them would be dismissed.

== Presidential pardons ==
2018 pardons for the Hammonds

On June 27, 2018, Oregon's 2nd Congressional District Representative Greg Walden spoke on the House floor, requesting presidential pardons for both Steven and Dwight Hammond. On July 1, 2018, he said he spoke to the president about the case. He remarked that the original trial's federal Judge Michael Robert Hogan said that conferring the mandatory sentence would, "...shock the conscience." The pair had pleaded guilty in a plea bargain after being convicted at trial on two charges, and acquitted on two others, with four charges remaining on which the jury had not come to a unanimous verdict. On July 1, Walden stated that President Donald Trump to whom he had spoken, was considering pardoning the Hammonds. Stephen had been scheduled to be released on June 29, 2019, and Dwight on February 13, 2020.

On July 10, 2018, Trump issued pardons for both men. A release from the White House press office stated, "The Hammonds are...imprisoned in connection with a fire that leaked onto a small portion of neighboring public grazing land," "The evidence at trial regarding the Hammonds’ responsibility for the fire was conflicting, and the jury acquitted them on most (sic) of the charges." According to his spokesperson Sarah Sanders, who read the statement, "The previous administration, however, filed an overzealous appeal that resulted in the Hammonds being sentenced to five years in prison."

Almost 4-1/2 years later, in early December 2022, during the Biden administration, members of the House Natural Resources Committee requested documents from the Secretary of the Interior regarding the pardons, citing "significant concerns” of a “potential case of bribery" by an Arizona real estate developer, who donated $10,000 to a Trump-associated PAC

== See also ==
- List of people granted executive clemency in the first Trump presidency
- List of people pardoned or granted clemency by the president of the United States
