= Glenn Palmer (sheriff) =

Sheriff of Grant County, Oregon
- Incumbent
- Assumed office November 2000
- Deputy: Zach Mobley

Personal details
- Born: 1961 (age 64–65)

Glenn E. Palmer (born 1961) is the former sheriff of Grant County, Oregon. Palmer was the only sheriff in Grant County history to be elected for five consecutive terms. He was first appointed in November 2000. Palmer lost his bid for reelection in 2020.

Palmer gained national attention with his controversial response during the armed occupation of the Malheur National Wildlife Refuge in 2016. He met with armed militants and insurrectionists who were holding the federal facility and called them "patriots".

== Career ==
Palmer began his law enforcement career in 1985, working as a corrections officer. He later served as a Deputy sheriff, and a patrolman in John Day. He was appointed sheriff in 2000 and elected the same year; and was reelected in 2004, 2008, 2012, and 2016.

=== Occupation of the Malheur National Wildlife Refuge ===
In early February 2016, LaVoy Finicum, Ammon Bundy, and others left the site of the occupation in Harney County in two trucks to drive to neighboring Grant County, where they expected to speak at a public meeting. Just before crossing into Grant County, their motorcade was stopped by police. The occupants of one truck surrendered at the initial traffic stop. Meanwhile, in the other truck, Finicum repeatedly yelled to police that they were going to speak in Grant County. Finicum then fled, speeding towards Grant County. A short way before the county line Finicum encountered a roadblock, where he was shot in the back and killed by the Oregon State Police. While this played out, Palmer was in uniform at the public meeting in Grant County, waiting for the meeting to start. It is assumed he did not know about the roadblock just south of the Grant County line because the FBI, and Oregon State Police considered Palmer to be a security leak. It is assumed that the roadblock was intentionally set in next door Harney County in order that Palmer would be kept in the dark about the operation.

Later that month, complaints were filed against Palmer by the chief of police for the city of John Day and also by the John Day dispatcher.

As of August 2016, Palmer was being investigated by the Oregon Department of Justice for tampering with public records. There were eleven complaints against him.

Palmer was reelected in 2016, with 51% of the vote.

Palmer lost his bid for reelection in 2020.

== Personal life ==
Palmer and his wife, RoseAnn, have three children and two grandchildren.
