= LaVoy Finicum =

American militia group spokesman (1961–2016)

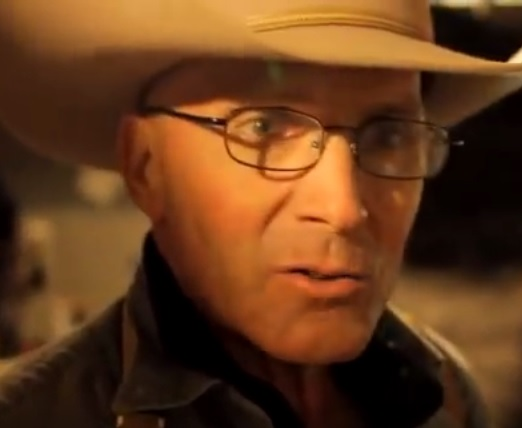
- Finicum at the Malheur National Wildlife Refuge in January 2016
- Born: Robert LaVoy Finicum; January 27, 1961; Kanab, Utah, U.S.
- Died: January 26, 2016 (aged 54); Harney County, Oregon, U.S.
- Cause of death: Gunshot wounds
- Resting place: Kanab, Utah
- Occupations: Main income as foster parent, also cattle rancher
- Spouses: Kelly Whatcott (m. 1983; div. 1989) Dorthea Jeannette (m. 1994)
- Children: 11
- Parent(s): David Finicum, Nelda Finicum

Robert LaVoy Finicum (January 27, 1961 – January 26, 2016) was one of the American militants who staged an armed occupation of the Malheur National Wildlife Refuge in January 2016. The occupying force organized itself as the Citizens for Constitutional Freedom, of which Finicum was a spokesman. Finicum was shot and killed by Oregon State Police during a stand-off on January 26, 2016. He was the only fatality of the occupation.

Before the occupation, Finicum lived in Arizona where he made a living as a foster parent and operated an unprofitable cattle ranch.

== Personal background ==
According to the High Country News, "the public record on Finicum is thin prior to 2014".

In 2002, he filed for bankruptcy while living in New Mexico and doing business as "Southwest Horse and Trails". By 2008, he operated a foster home for troubled boys near Chino Valley, Arizona. According to a 2010 tax filing, Catholic Charities Community Services in Arizona paid the family US$115,343 to foster children in 2009.

In January 2016, the state removed all of Finicum's foster children because of his involvement with the armed occupation of the Malheur National Wildlife Refuge. Finicum said this took away his main source of income. Although he also owned a cattle ranch, Finicum claimed it made little to no profit, as the "cows just cover the costs of the ranch."

== Initial protests ==
In August 2015, Finicum ceased complying with the terms of his grazing permit with the Bureau of Land Management (BLM). At the time, he released a YouTube video arguing that federal ownership of BLM lands was unconstitutional. In the video, he said he was inspired by Nevada rancher Cliven Bundy and the 2014 Bundy standoff. In less than six months, Finicum accrued more than US$12,000 in fees and fines, which he refused to pay.

In 2016, Finicum was mentioned in court filings in the government's felony case against fellow militant William Keebler, who planted a bomb at a BLM cabin near Finicum's ranch earlier that year. In the first complaint filed with the court, the government erroneously alleged Finicum had accompanied Keebler on a "reconnaissance" of the cabin in October 2015.

The government later filed a corrected complaint and an FBI agent testified that Finicum had not actually been there. His widow said Keebler had been at their ranch on other business that day, and said that her husband had no knowledge of Keebler's bombing plans.

== Refuge occupation and death ==
=== Participation in the occupation ===
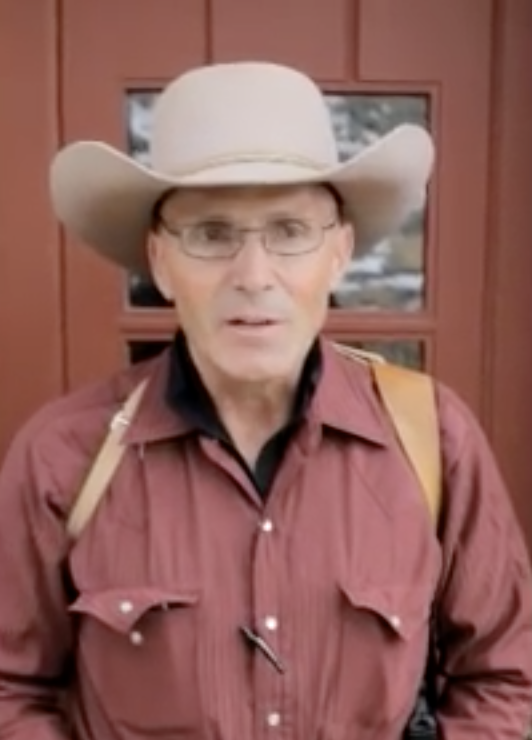
LaVoy Finicum speaking in a video posted to YouTube during the occupation

Finicum was a spokesman for the armed militants who occupied the Malheur National Wildlife Refuge in early 2016. He was dubbed "Tarp Man" by MSNBC for sitting outside at night in a rocking chair, holding a rifle on his lap, and sometimes covering himself completely with a blue tarpaulin for additional protection against the elements. When asked on January 6 if he would rather be killed than arrested if the occupation turned violent, Finicum replied, "I have no intention of spending any of my days in a concrete box."

=== First arrest attempt ===
On January 26, Finicum was one of several occupation leaders who left the refuge in Harney County in a two-truck convoy. The convoy also included the occupation leaders, Ammon Bundy, Ryan Bundy, Shawna Cox and Ryan Payne, and two supporters, Victoria Sharp and Brian Cavalier. Their intention was to speak at a senior center in John Day, Grant County. Finicum was driving his white Dodge pickup truck, followed by a dark-colored Jeep.

Oregon State Police unsuccessfully attempting to arrest two of Finicum's passengers, Ryan Bundy and Shawna Cox, during a traffic stop. Finicum fled.

State and federal authorities used the opportunity to intercept them with a two-phase operation involving a traffic stop and a roadblock about two miles further along the highway. Both were set up on an unpopulated stretch of U.S. Route 395 in Harney County. The operation had originally been planned for a location in adjacent Grant County, but was moved to Harney County—federal and state police considered Grant County Sheriff Glenn Palmer a security risk due to his pro-militia comments. Authorities feared a militia response, and a location was selected with poor cell phone service.

As the convoy entered the operation area, vehicles driven by the FBI and the OSP pulled in behind the Jeep. When the Jeep pulled over, Ammon Bundy and Cavalier were peacefully arrested. The driver of the Jeep, Mark McConnell, who was a government informant and the only occupant of the vehicle with a firearm, was not arrested or charged.

Driving the lead vehicle, Finicum initially kept going but eventually stopped as well. Police fired a 40 mm plastic-tipped round of pepper spray, which hit the top of his truck. At that point, Ryan Payne exited Finicum's truck and surrendered peacefully. Finicum's other passengers, Ryan Bundy, Shawna Cox and Victoria Sharp, remained in his truck.

After Payne's surrender, Cox and Bundy each started recording cell phone videos of the confrontation. The videos captured police identifying themselves as Oregon State Police and ordering Finicum to turn off his engine. Refusing their order, Finicum shouted back that he was going to meet Sheriff Palmer and that the only way officers could prevent that meeting was to shoot him. Finicum yelled at the troopers:

"You back down or you kill me now. Go ahead. Put the bullet through me. I don't care. I'm going to go meet the sheriff. You do as you damned well please."

=== Flight and death ===
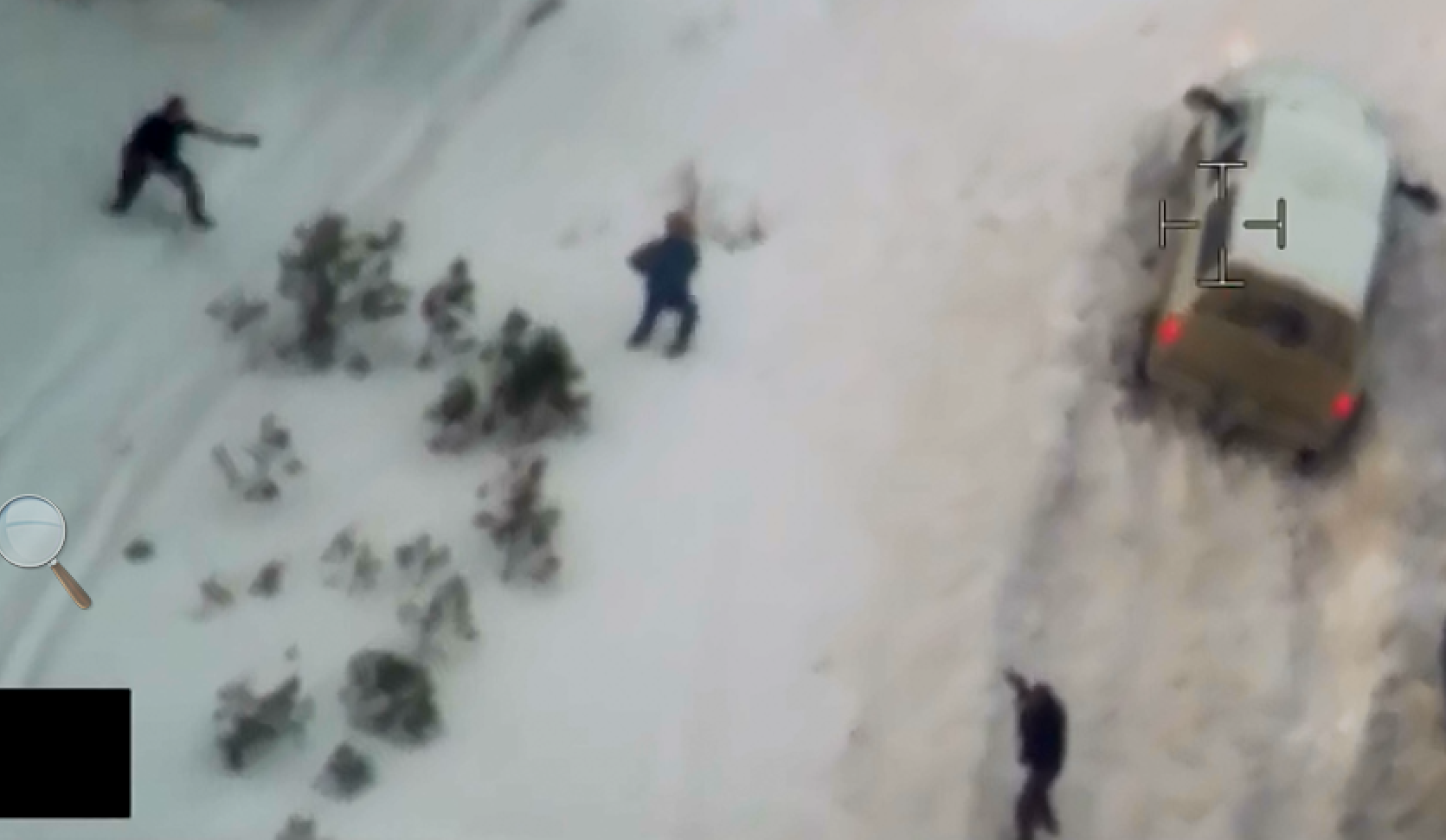
Finicum (center) reaching toward his side or pocket immediately before being shot by Oregon State Police.

About seven minutes after stopping his truck, Finicum drove away at high speed with his three remaining passengers. They were pursued by officers. About 1 mile (1,609 m) later, Finicum rounded a bend and spotted the roadblock. Trying to avoid a spike strip, Finicum braked and swerved. His truck plunged into deep snow, narrowly missing an FBI agent.

When Finicum's truck became stuck in the snow, he left the vehicle, with his hands raised and repeatedly shouted "go ahead and shoot me". Two shots were fired by an FBI agent as Finicum exited the truck. One shot struck the truck roof and the other went wide. These shots later became the subject of controversy because the FBI agents initially failed to disclose them.

Meanwhile, Finicum moved about in the snow, alternating between holding his hands above his head and seemingly reaching into his jacket, where officers later found a loaded semi-automatic weapon. OSP officers and FBI agents armed with rifles positioned themselves along the road, while an OSP officer, who had holstered his firearm and equipped himself with a non-lethal Taser X2, walked toward him from the treeline with the intention of subduing him.

As Finicum moved his hands down, he turned toward the approaching taser-holding officer and repeatedly yelled, "You're going to have to shoot me!" The troopers believed Finicum to be armed and considered his hand position to signal an imminent threat to the life of the taser-holding officer; Finicum was holding his jacket with his left hand and reaching for a pocket with his right. Two troopers fired a total of three times. A third who was about to fire held back, realizing a fourth shot was not needed. Medical assistance was given to Finicum approximately ten minutes after the shooting.

== Aftermath of death ==
=== Investigation ===
After Finicum's death, officials stated that he was reaching for a gun in his pocket when he was shot by a state trooper. The FBI also said that a loaded handgun was found in Finicum's pocket. It was later identified as a 9 mm Ruger SR9 handgun. Finicum received the handgun as a gift from his stepson. His public autopsy was performed on January 28, but officials withheld the autopsy report from the press until March 8. The cause of death was listed as three gunshot wounds to the back, abdomen and chest. All wounds were specified as gunshot entry from the back (posterior left shoulder, left upper back and right lower back).

Investigators with the Deschutes County Sheriff's Office, assigned to process the scene of Finicum's shooting, were accounting for the two known sets of shots fired by the OSP officers during the event (the shots that killed Finicum, and the earlier shots that struck his vehicle) when they discovered a bullet that struck the roof of the truck at a different trajectory. After ascertaining the bullet's existence with cell phone video taken by one of Finicum's passengers, investigators modeled the bullet's trajectory using computers, and determined that the bullet was fired from the direction where two FBI agents were standing. They later determined that an FBI Hostage Rescue Team member fired twice at Finicum, missed him but injured a second militant in the process. The agent, whose identity was withheld, was under investigation, along with four other FBI agents who were suspected of attempting to conceal evidence of the gunshots. They reportedly told investigators that none of them fired a shot during the incident.

During initial processing of the scene, the rifle cartridge casings purportedly fired by the FBI agent were reported not present. However, an OSP officer later described seeing two casings at the scene near where the FBI agents were positioned. FBI aerial surveillance video shows agents searching the area, then huddling together before breaking up moments later, with one agent bending over twice to pick up an unknown object. Law enforcement officials began the investigation into the gunshots after watching the full surveillance video and suspecting something was amiss. Two FBI pickup trucks were searched for casings, but none were found, while at least three OSP officers were interrogated about their initial processing of the scene.

On March 8, officials revealed their findings to the public. The U.S. Department of Justice launched an investigation into the conduct of the agents. Deschutes County Sheriff's Office investigators, along with the district attorneys of Malheur and Harney counties, declared that Finicum's shooting death was "justified and necessary".

On April 5, cellphone video footage shot by another of Finicum's passengers was released by authorities.

=== Prosecution and acquittal of FBI agent ===
An FBI agent, W. Joseph Astarita, was alleged to have fired two shots at Finicum's pickup, one of which penetrated the roof of the pickup and exited through a window. FBI agents were believed to have recovered the ejected empty cartridges. A five-count indictment for lying about the circumstances at the scene of Finicum's death and obstruction of justice was obtained in Portland against Astarita by the Department of Justice. He was represented by a public defender and his trial began in Portland in late July 2018. A federal jury found Astarita to be not guilty on all charges on August 10, 2018.

=== Accidental release of identity of one of the state troopers who shot Finicum ===
Authorities attempted to withhold the identities of the two state troopers who shot Finicum. Nonetheless, during Astarita's trial, one witness accidentally identified one of them as then-Lieutenant (and now Superintendent) Casey Codding.

=== Reactions ===
Before the video of the action was released, some of the militants and supporters had claimed that Finicum was co-operating with the police when he was shot. This included a claim by the Nevada legislator Michele Fiore (who was not present at the arrest) that "he was just murdered with his hands up". Cliven Bundy was quoted as saying that Finicum was "sacrificed for a good purpose". In a March 3 interview in jail, Ammon Bundy called the shooting "egregious" and said that the officers involved "should be ashamed of it".

At a news conference, officials had initially declined to comment on the Finicum shooting because the encounter was still under investigation, but they later released surveillance video of the incident, which officials said shows Finicum reaching for a handgun after feigning surrender. However, Finicum's family continued to dispute the nature of the shooting, claiming that he was shot in the back while his hands were in the air, and denied the FBI's assertion that Finicum was armed at the time of his death. The Finicum family commissioned a private autopsy, but declined to make the results public.

The Oregon State Police received death threats. On February 6, more than 1,000 attended Finicum's funeral in Kanab, Utah, while others rebuilt a razed memorial on U.S. Route 395. About another 100 people led by the 3 Percenters rallied at the Idaho State Capitol in the afternoon in honor of Finicum, who they believed was unarmed at the time of his death. On March 4, a group of about a dozen armed protesters surrounded a federal courthouse in Tucson, Arizona, demanding the state troopers who shot Finicum be indicted and fired. Another rally, led by Finicum's widow, was held at the Utah State Capitol on March 5 with 200–300 people in attendance. Several dozen rallies were held at locations throughout the U.S. on the following Saturday.

On May 12, more than a dozen Arizona politicians wrote a letter to Oregon Governor Kate Brown, in which they asked her to conduct another, more transparent investigation into Finicum's death.

On August 27, 2016, Finicum's widow, Jeanette, announced her plans to sue the OSP and the FBI for civil rights violations relating to his death. She retained a California-based attorney, who also represented Ryan Bundy, for the case.

On January 26, 2018, Finicum's family filed a wrongful death lawsuit in the United States district court in Pendleton, Oregon. Named as defendants were the United States, the Federal Bureau of Investigation, Oregon State Police, the Bureau of Land Management, the Oregon governor Kate Brown, Greg Bretzing, former FBI special agent in charge in Portland, acquitted FBI agent Astarita, U.S. Senator Ron Wyden of Oregon, former U.S. Senator Harry Reid of Nevada, Harney County Sheriff Dave Ward, Harney County commissioner Steven Grasty, the Center for Biological Diversity and unnamed officers. The lawsuit sought more than $5 million in damages for Finicum's wife and each of their 12 children and his estate. Kieran Suckling, the executive director of the Center for Biological Diversity, called the suit a "bizarre, incoherent, yet nonetheless dangerous, attack on free speech". On July 24, 2020, federal Magistrate Judge Patricia Sullivan dismissed claims against all defendants except the Oregon State Police. In August 2021, U.S. District Judge Michael W. Mosman dismissed the family's claims against the Oregon State Police, the former state police superintendent, the state troopers who fired at Finicum, all claims filed against the federal government, the FBI, Harney County and former Harney County Sheriff Dave Ward. Only a single civil rights claim against Gov. Kate Brown survived Mosman's ruling.
