= David Glerup =

Sheriff of Harney County, Oregon

Sheriff of Harney County, Oregon
- In office 1985 – January 1, 2015
- Succeeded by: David Ward

Personal details
- Born: 1951 (age 74–75)

David Glerup (born 1951) is the former sheriff of Harney County, Oregon. Born in Burns, Oregon, Glerup attended Burns High School and subsequently graduated from Southern Oregon College where he was a member of the wrestling team. In 1972 he joined the Oregon State Police (OSP) and was initially posted to Medford, Oregon. Glerup quit the OSP in the late 1970s and returned to Burns where he went into private business. In 1984 he was elected sheriff of Harney County, becoming the only law enforcement officer employed by the county (the other four employees of the sheriff's office at the time were jailors and process servers).

Glerup was re-elected two more times before losing the 1996 election. He successfully ran again for sheriff in 2000 and was reelected in 2004, 2008, and 2012. In 2012, Glerup, one of his deputies, and an FBI special agent, were involved in a deadly shootout with Philip Ferguson, a fugitive from Indiana wanted in connection with the embezzlement of $30 million. Ferguson, who had been featured on "America's Most Wanted", died in the exchange.

Glerup retired in 2015 prior to the conclusion of his sixth term as sheriff.
