= Occupation of the Malheur National Wildlife Refuge =

2016 militant action in Oregon, US

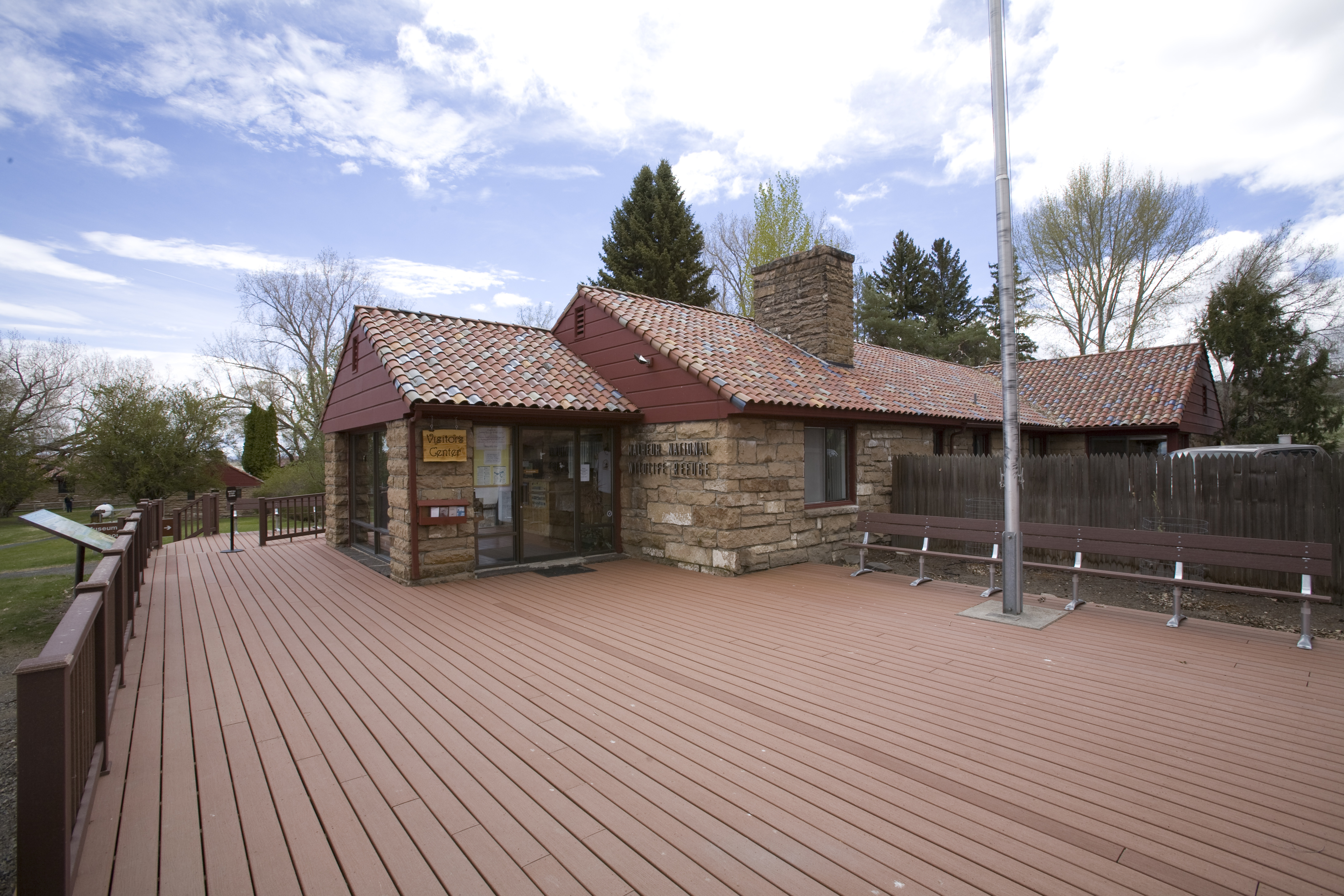
- The headquarters of the Malheur National Wildlife Refuge were occupied by armed militants in early 2016.
- Date: January 2, 2016 – February 11, 2016 (40 days)
- Location: Harney County, Oregon (30 mi (48 km) south of Burns, Oregon); 43°15′55″N 118°50′39″W
- Caused by: Return to prison of ranchers who pled guilty to arson on federal property and group's belief the federal government lacks authority to own and manage public lands in U.S. states; Leader's belief to be under the direction of a divine message
- Goals: Short-term: Disrupt the work of federal employees at the Malheur National Wildlife Refuge; Release of Dwight and Steven Hammond from custody and the establishment of an "independent evidentiary hearing board" by state and county representatives to re-examine the Hammonds' case; Long-term: Transfer of federal lands to private ownership or to state, county, or local government control
- Methods: Armed occupation of federal property; claim adverse possession of the "land, property and vacant buildings"; Convene a "citizens grand jury"; Encourage the formation of a "committee of safety"; Petition; Public meetings; Rallies and marches; Social media and press conferences
- Result: 26 militants were all indicted and arrested for federal felony conspiracy offenses and some other individual charges. A 27th militant was indicted and arrested for theft of federal property, but not for conspiracy.; Charges against one defendant, Peter Santilli, were dropped; Twelve pleaded guilty; Seven were acquitted by a federal jury on October 27, 2016; Four were convicted by a federal jury on March 20, 2017; A total of $78,000 in fines between $3,000 and $10,000 were assessed against thirteen defendants; Nine were sent to prison; One militant was killed while resisting arrest, and one militant was wounded before being arrested.

Parties
United States; Federal Bureau of Investigation (FBI); U.S. Fish and Wildlife Service (FWS); State of Oregon; Governor of Oregon; Oregon State Police (OSP); Grant County Sheriff's Office (GCSO); Harney County Sheriff's Office (HCSO); Burns Paiute Tribe; Burns Paiute Tribal Police	Anti-government militants; Pro-occupation: Citizens for Constitutional Freedom; Anti-occupation: Pacific Patriots Network (PPN); 3 Percenters of Idaho

Lead figures
Gregory T. Bretzing (FBI Special Agent in Charge); State of Oregon; Kate Brown (Oregon Governor); Steven E. Grasty (Harney County Judge); David M. Ward (Harney County Sheriff)	Ammon Bundy; Ryan Bundy; Brian Cavalier; Blaine Cooper; Robert LaVoy Finicum †; Ryan Payne; Jon Ritzheimer

Number
FBI – unknown; Oregon State Police – unknown; ~37 local police	40 (Los Angeles Times estimate) "Several dozen" (The Washington Post estimate) 20 to 25 (The Oregonian estimate)

One occupier dead, one wounded
- Deaths: Robert LaVoy Finicum
- Injuries: Ryan Bundy
- Arrested: 27
- Charged: 27
- Fined: 13
- Location in Oregon Occupation of the Malheur National Wildlife Refuge (the United States)

On January 2, 2016, an armed group of right-wing militants seized and occupied the headquarters of the Malheur National Wildlife Refuge in Harney County, Oregon, and continued to occupy it until law enforcement made a final arrest on February 11, 2016. Their leader was Ammon Bundy, who participated in the 2014 Bundy standoff at his father's Nevada ranch. Other members of the group were loosely affiliated with non-governmental militias and the sovereign citizen movement.

The organizers were seeking an opportunity to advance their view that the federal government is constitutionally required to turn over most of the federal public land they manage to the individual states, in particular land managed by the Bureau of Land Management (BLM), United States Fish and Wildlife Service (USFWS), United States Forest Service (USFS), and other agencies. In 2015, the militants believed they could do this by protesting the treatment of two area ranchers convicted of federal land arson, who they believed were wrongly convicted, even though the men in question, Dwight and Steven Dwight Hammond, father and son, did not want their assistance. The occupation began when Bundy led an armed party to the refuge headquarters following a peaceful public rally in the nearby city of Burns.

By February 11, all of the militants had surrendered or withdrawn from the occupation, with several leaders having been arrested after leaving the site; one of them, Robert LaVoy Finicum, was shot and killed during an attempt to arrest him after he reached toward a handgun concealed in his pocket after he tried to evade a roadblock; Ryan Bundy was wounded. More than two dozen of the militants were charged with federal offenses, including conspiracy to obstruct federal officers, firearms violations, theft, and depredation of federal property.

By August 2017, a dozen had pleaded guilty, and six of those had been sentenced to 1–2 years' probation, some including house arrest. Seven others, including Ammon and Ryan Bundy, were tried and acquitted of all federal charges. Five more had been found guilty and were sentenced months later. Seven of the militants saw prison time for their roles in the occupation. Jake Ryan and Duane Ehmer each received 366 days in prison, with Ryan additionally getting three years of supervised probation. Darryl Thorn received 18 months of prison time on November 21, 2017. Jason Patrick received 21 months on February 15, 2018. Ryan Payne was sentenced to 37 months in federal prison and 3 years of supervision on February 27, 2018. Jon Ritzheimer was sentenced to 366 days in federal prison and another 12 months in a residential re-entry program. Corey Lequieu was sentenced to 30 months in prison and three years of supervision. Two others, Joe O'Shaughnessy and Brian Cavalier, were detained for at least a year but released after time served, with three years of supervision each and fines.

== Background ==
=== Location ===
Harney County is a rural county in eastern Oregon. The county seat is the city of Burns. Though it is one of the largest counties by area in the United States, its population is only about 7,700, and cattle outnumber people 14 to 1. About 73 percent of the county's area is federal land, variously managed by the United States Bureau of Land Management (BLM), the United States Forest Service (USFS), and the United States Fish and Wildlife Service (USFWS).

The Malheur National Wildlife Refuge, located in Harney County, was established in 1908 by President Theodore Roosevelt, a conservationist. Located in the Pacific Flyway, and currently encompassing 187,757 acres (760 km^{2}), it is "one of the premiere sites for birds and birding in the U.S.", according to the Audubon Society of Portland. Tourism, especially birding, injects US$15 million into the local economy annually.

=== Leadership ===
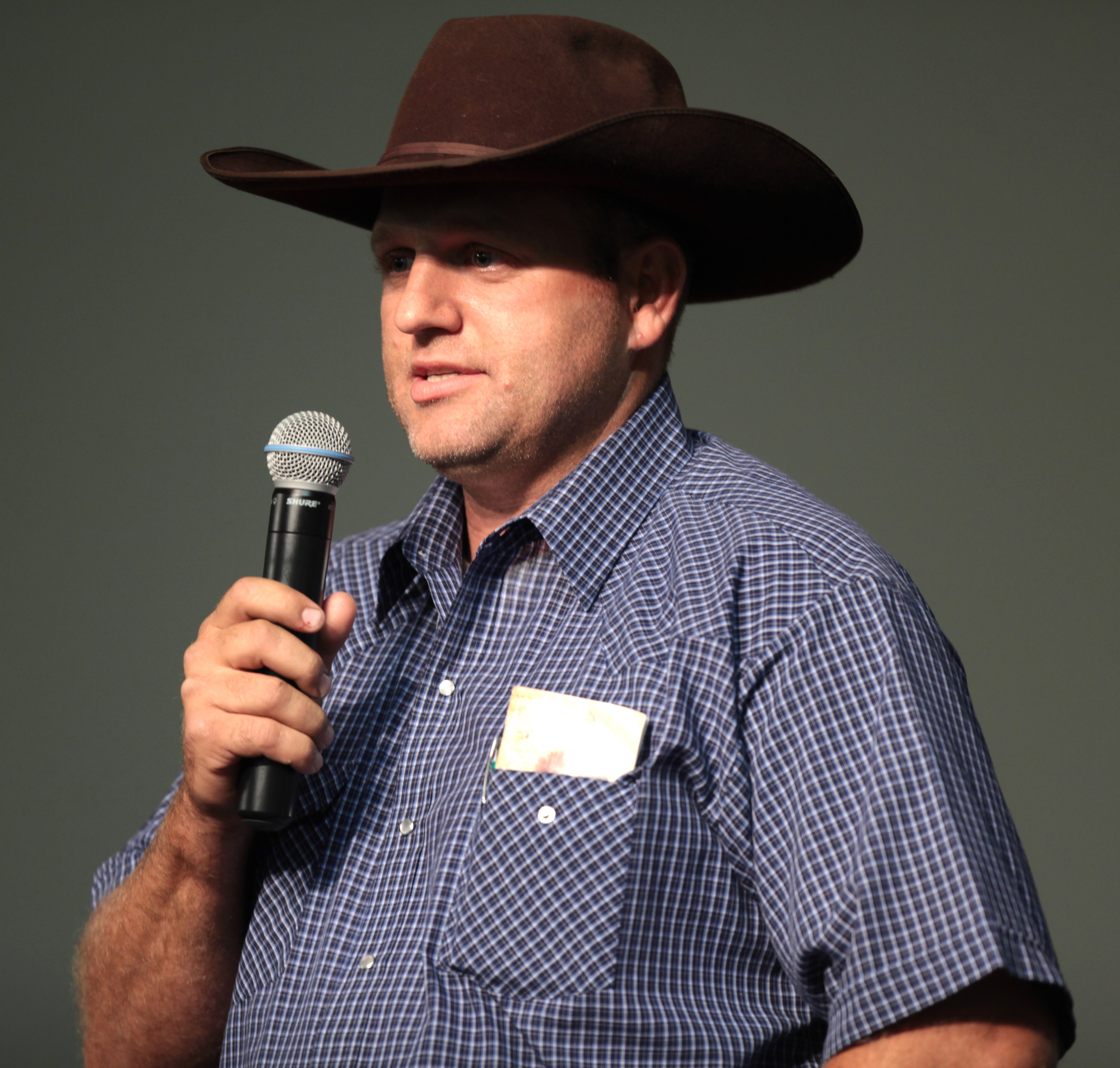
Ammon Bundy, son of Cliven Bundy, in Mesa, Arizona, July 2014

The leader of the occupation was Ammon Bundy—a native of Bunkerville, Nevada, owner of a car fleet management company in Phoenix, Arizona, and a recent resident of Emmett, Idaho. Ammon Bundy was also the leader of a group which he formed shortly before the occupation, which he later named the Citizens for Constitutional Freedom.

Ammon's father, Cliven D. Bundy, had organized and led a somewhat similar incident in March 2014, roughly two years earlier. Both Bundys are members of the Church of Jesus Christ of Latter-day Saints and claimed that their armed opposition to the federal government was ordained for them via divine messages ordering them to do so.

Also in a leadership position amongst the militants was the group's occasional spokesman LaVoy Finicum, another Mormon, who owned a ranch at Cane Beds, in the Arizona Strip, near the community of Colorado City, Arizona. He had recently authored a self-published post-apocalyptic novel. Ammon's brother, Ryan Bundy, was also amongst the militants present, and was later arrested for his role in the occupation.

On December 1, 2019, an investigation commissioned by the Washington House of Representatives reported then-Washington state legislator, theocrat, and white supremacist Matt Shea, had planned and participated in domestic terrorism on at least three occasions. This included his participation, organizing, planning, and promotion of the 2014 Bundy standoff in Nevada; the 2015 armed conflict in Priest River, Idaho; and the 2016 armed seizure of the Malheur Refuge. Shea led a delegation of right-wing legislators from Oregon, Washington, and Idaho that met with law enforcement on January 9, 2016, in Burns, Oregon, where they were apprised of confidential intended law enforcement strategies for dealing with the refuge occupiers. The state House district's Republican Representative, Cliff Bentz, attended the meeting, despite being warned by Harney County Judge Steven Grasty to decline the invitation. Bentz did, however, warn western Oregon state Representative Dallas Heard, from Roseburg, that it would be "inappropriate" for Heard to attend, though Heard ignored the advice. Shea then disclosed those details to the Bundys, according to the report.

=== Hammond arson case ===
In 2012, Dwight Lincoln Hammond Jr., 73, and Steven Dwight Hammond, 46, were both convicted of two counts of arson on federal land, in relation to two fires they set in 2001 and 2006. In a mid-trial settlement agreement, the Hammonds agreed not to appeal the arson convictions to have other charges dismissed by the government. The Hammonds were also told the prosecutor would seek the mandatory minimum sentence of five years. Ultimately, Dwight Hammond was sentenced to three months' imprisonment and his son Steven was sentenced to a year and a day's imprisonment, which both men served. In 2015, the sentences were, however, vacated by the United States Court of Appeals for the Ninth Circuit, which then remanded re-sentencing. In October 2015, a judge re-sentenced the Hammonds to five years in prison (with credit for time served), ordering that they return to prison on January 4, 2016. Stephen was scheduled to be released on June 29, 2019, and Dwight on February 13, 2020. They were pardoned by then-President Donald Trump on July 10, 2018.

In late 2015, the Hammonds' case attracted the attention of Ammon Bundy and Ryan Payne. In November 2015, Bundy and his associates began publicizing the Hammonds' case via social media. Over the ensuing weeks, Bundy and Payne attempted to set up plans for what they described as a peaceful protest with Harney County Sheriff, David M. Ward, as well as request that the sheriff's office protect the Hammonds from being taken into custody by federal authorities. A sympathetic Ward declined Bundy and Payne's request. He later said that he began receiving death threats by email.

Despite several early meetings with Bundy and Payne, the Hammonds eventually rejected their offers of assistance.

=== Prelude to the occupation ===
On November 5, 2015, Ammon Bundy called Harney County Sheriff David Ward and arranged a meeting later the same day. At the meeting, Ammon Bundy and Montana militiaman Ryan Payne insisted to Sheriff Ward that Ward must shield Dwight and Steven Hammond against re-imprisonment. Ward recalled that when he explained that he did not have the authority to shield the Hammonds from a lawful sentence, Bundy's and Payne's demeanor became threatening. Payne told Ward that if he did not shield the Hammonds from imprisonment, "thousands" of armed militiamen would come to the county to "do Ward's job" for him—and Payne pointedly noted that he might not be able to control what else the militia might do. By late fall, local, state, and federal law enforcement agencies noticed that members of anti-government militias had started to relocate to Harney County, and the USFWS began circulating a photograph of Ammon Bundy with instructions for staff to "be on the lookout".

By early December 2015, Bundy and Payne had moved to Burns. The same month, they organized a meeting at the Harney County Fairgrounds to rally support for their efforts. At the meeting, a "committee of safety" was organized by Bundy and Payne to orchestrate direct action against the Hammond sentences. According to that group's website, the Harney County Committee of Safety considers itself "a governmental body established by the people in the absence of the ability of the existing government to provide for the needs and protection of civilized society" (during the American Revolution, committees of safety were shadow governments organized to usurp authority from colonial administrators).

From mid-November to late December 2015, residents began to notice significant numbers of outsiders in the community, often dressed in military-style attire and openly carrying handguns and sometimes rifles. Some of these armed newcomers engaged in what local people considered threatening and harassing behavior, such as approaching shoppers in local stores and aggressively asking their opinions about the Hammond family. Many residents considered these actions deliberate intimidation, intended to sway the community to join the outsider's unspecified plan to "protect" the Hammonds from re-arrest. Contrary to local custom, some residents began carrying guns in public locations. Many lived in fear that some kind of violent event was about to take place.

On December 30, 2015, USFWS staff members at Malheur National Wildlife Refuge were dismissed early from work. With tensions rising in nearby Burns, supervisors left staff with the final instruction not to return to the refuge unless explicitly directed to do so. Meanwhile, some Burns residents reported harassment and intimidation by militia members. According to the spouses and children of several federal employees and local police, they had been followed home or to school by vehicles with out-of-state license plates.

On January 1, 2016, a forum held at the Harney County Fairgrounds drew about 60 residents and militia members. A Burns-area resident who organized the event described it as an opportunity to defuse tensions that had been simmering between locals and out-of-town militia in the preceding days. The event alternated between expressions of sympathy for the Hammonds and suggestions that a peaceful rally could be beneficial.

The Lord was not pleased with what was happening to the Hammonds. ... If we allowed the Hammonds to continue to be punished, there would be accountability.

— Ammon Bundy, speaking in a video posted on YouTube on January 1

On January 2, a rally of about 300 people gathered in a Safeway supermarket parking lot in Burns, organized by the Pacific Patriots Network (PPN), a militia umbrella organization that includes the 3 Percenters of Idaho. Members of the Pacific Patriots Network had been active in Harney County since November, drawn there by the Hammond arson case. Following speeches, the crowd marched to the home of Dwight and Steven Hammond, stopping briefly en route to protest outside the sheriff's office and the county courthouse. The crowd then returned to the Safeway parking lot and broke up. According to KOIN, the CBS-affiliated television station in Portland, Oregon, there was "no visible police presence at any point".

== Armed occupation ==
=== First week ===
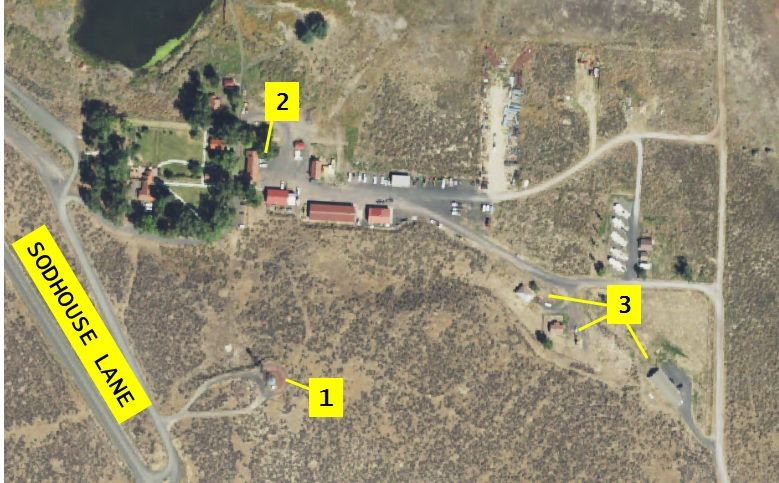
A USGS satellite image of the Malheur National Wildlife Refuge headquarters shows a fire lookout used as a watch tower (1), the main offices used as a headquarters (2), and buildings used as a canteen and barracks (3).

Before the protest crowd broke up, Ammon Bundy announced to the crowd his plan to occupy the Malheur National Wildlife Refuge, and he encouraged people to join him. His announcement surprised a PPN rally organizer, who later stated he felt betrayed. Ammon and Ryan Bundy—along with armed associates—separated from the crowd and proceeded to the refuge headquarters, located 30 miles (48 km) south of Burns. The militants settled into the refuge and set up defensive positions. Right before the occupation began, the militants notified the Harney County Sheriff's Office and also contacted a utility company with the intention of taking over the refuge's electric and other services, according to a motion to dismiss and memorandum filed by Ammon Bundy's lawyers on May 9.

Law enforcement kept away from the refuge, but various security measures were taken in surrounding areas. By the evening of January 4, no overt police presence was visible in the area between the town and the refuge headquarters. Upon hearing of the occupation at the wildlife refuge, the two ranchers on whose behalf the militants were ostensibly acting disavowed the action.

On January 2, the militia leaders claimed to have 150 armed members at the site, though one journalist reported that no more than a dozen armed militants were on the site, and another reported a claim that there were "between six and 12". On January 3, The Oregonian said there were roughly 20 to 25 people present and that the militants had deployed into defensive positions. On January 3, Ammon Bundy claimed that area residents were supplying them.

Other protest groups took varying positions. On January 2, the 3 Percenters of Idaho militia disclaimed involvement, calling the occupation a small splinter action.

Ryan Bundy stated that the militant group wanted the Hammonds to be released and for the federal government to relinquish control of the Malheur National Forest. On January 3, Ammon Bundy said the ultimate goal of the militants was to "get the economics here in the county revived" for logging and outdoor recreation. On January 4, the militants announced a formal name for their group, Citizens for Constitutional Freedom.

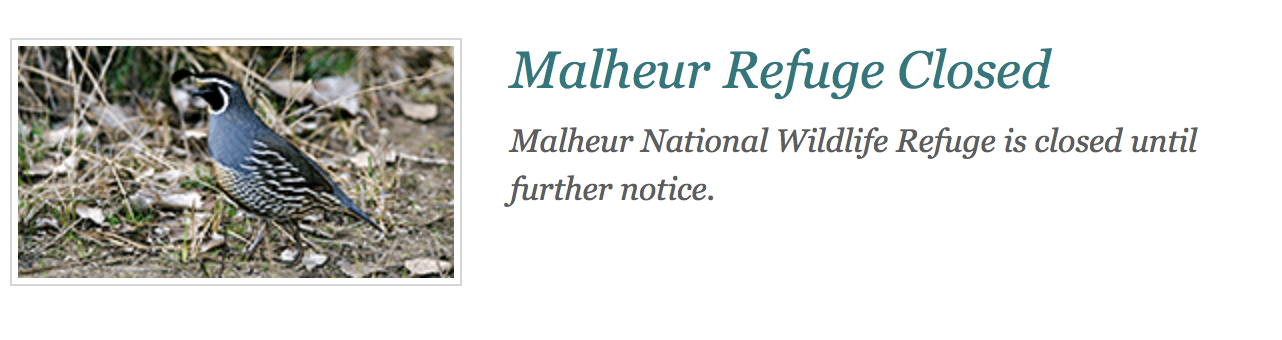
Notice posted on the Malheur National Wildlife Refuge's website stating its closure "until further notice"

On January 4, Steven E. Grasty, the judge-executive of Harney County, emailed Ammon Bundy requesting that he leave the refuge. Harney County Sheriff David Ward then requested that the Bundys and others leave. In response, Ryan Bundy said he wasn't convinced Ward spoke for all of the people in the county. Meanwhile, on January 4, Dwight and Steven Hammond voluntarily reported to begin serving the remainder of their respective prison sentences.

In a public meeting held on January 6 at the Harney County Fairgrounds, nearly everyone present, according to Oregon Public Broadcasting, raised their hands when Ward asked who thought the militants should leave. Ward then offered to escort the militants to the county line if they would depart voluntarily.

A fistfight erupted at the refuge on the evening of January 6 when three members of a group calling themselves Veterans on Patrol attempted to enter the headquarters and convince women, children, and Ryan Payne to leave. Instead, they were repelled by militants, leaving one member of the Veterans on Patrol with a black eye. Family members of some of the militants were present at the refuge during the occupation, including a minor son of Ammon Bundy, as well as the children of some of the visitors sympathetic to the militia.

On January 7, Sheriff Ward and other local sheriffs met with Ammon Bundy and Ryan Payne 20 miles (32 km) from the site of the occupation. Sheriff Ward repeated his earlier offer to escort the militants out of the county. Bundy rejected the offer, saying the occupation would continue until management of federal land in the county had been turned over to residents.

=== Second week ===
On January 8, members of other militias later met with the militants, asking them to establish a perimeter around the occupied area to avoid a "Waco-style situation". Several other militia and anti-government groups, some armed, arrived and received a mixed reception. The 3 Percenters of Idaho announced it was sending some of its members to "secure a perimeter" around the Malheur National Wildlife Refuge compound and prevent a repeat of the Waco siege. Ammon Bundy initially welcomed the arrival of the additional militants, but hours after they arrived at the refuge on the morning of January 9, the convoy of new militants from the Pacific Patriots Network, led by Brandon Curtiss, president of the 3 Percenters of Idaho, were asked to leave by Utah attorney Todd MacFarlane, who acted as a mediator. The new militants left the refuge that afternoon.

By January 10, an influx of armed groups and individuals was rotating through Burns, with some declaring they were there to support the occupation, others to try to convince the militants to quit, and still others with undefined purposes. Some militants, meanwhile, left the occupation completely.

On January 11, the militants removed a stretch of fence between the refuge and an adjacent ranch, apparently to give the adjacent ranch access to land that had been blocked for years. but the ranch owners did not want the fence taken down and subsequently repaired it. The militants began searching through government documents stored for proof of government wrongdoing toward local ranchers.

On January 12, the militants told KOIN reporter Chris Holmstrom that the refuge facilities were messy and unorganized when they arrived, and Jason Patrick asserted that they encountered rat feces two inches (51 mm) deep. KOIN recorded some of their cleaning efforts in a garage.

Bruce Doucette, the owner of a computer repair shop in Denver, Colorado, and a self-proclaimed judge, announced on January 12 that he would convene a "citizens grand jury" to charge government officials with various crimes. Doucette's claims to be a judge are consistent with legal frauds often practiced by the sovereign citizen movement and other anti-government movements.

On January 14, Ammon Bundy announced that the militants planned a longer stay and were reaching out to nearby county sheriffs for support. Michael Ray Emry, speaking for Bruce Doucette, threatened to hold "a trial with the redress of grievance" against the county and other government officials.

Harney County Judge Steven Grasty, Sheriff Ward, and other county officials were served false legal documents by the militants. On January 15, the Oregon State Police arrested a militant at the Safeway in Burns who had been driving a government vehicle stolen from the refuge headquarters.

Also on January 15, the Oath Keepers anti-government militia group warned of a prospective "conflagration so great, it cannot be stopped, leading to a bloody, brutal civil war" if the situation descended into violence.

=== Third and fourth weeks ===
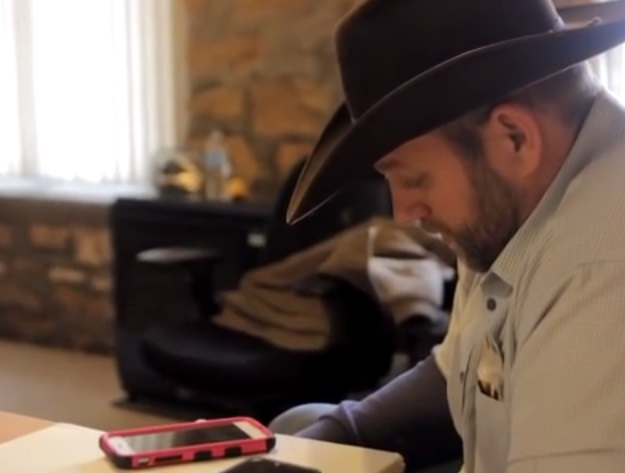
Ammon Bundy speaks to an FBI negotiator via speaker phone at the Malheur National Wildlife Refuge on January 21.

Militant numbers continued to grow to "several dozen" according to one report or about 40 in another.

On January 16, LaVoy Finicum told The Washington Post that "[i]t needs to be very clear that these buildings will never, ever return to the federal government", reiterating the group's demands for the federal government to cede ownership of the wildlife refuge.

The militants began to vandalize the property, which local community leaders characterized as an attempt to provoke violent confrontation. A video released by the militants showed them inspecting a locked storage room for archaeological artifacts held in agreement with the Burns Paiute Tribe, an Indian nation in Harney County, leading the tribe to ask the federal authorities to block the passage of occupiers to the site.

We also recognize that the Native Americans had the claim to the land, but they lost that claim. There are things to learn from cultures of the past, but the current culture is the most important.

— Ryan Bundy

On January 19, Ammon Bundy and several other militant occupiers appeared unannounced at a community meeting in Burns without addressing the crowd. Residents urged an end to the occupation, as did rallies held by opponents in Eugene, Portland, Oregon, and Idaho.

On January 21, Bundy met with the Federal Bureau of Investigation (FBI) and discussed with them about relinquishing federal government control of the refuge as well as the release of Dwight and Steven Hammond. He agreed to meet with the FBI again the next day, but at the meeting, Bundy left after the agent present declined to negotiate in front of the media.

On January 23, the militants hosted a news conference at the refuge, promising news reporters that an Oregon cattle rancher and one from New Mexico would be present to sign papers renouncing their federal grazing permits. Although the Oregon rancher did not show up, the one from New Mexico did. At the conference, Adrian C. Sewell, of Grant County, New Mexico, renounced his federal grazing permit. The Oregonian newspaper noted that "Sewell's all-American credentials are tarnished" by a conviction on eight counts of assault with a deadly weapon in Oklahoma in 2002.

== January 26 arrests and shooting ==
FBI surveillance footage shows Robert LaVoy Finicum's truck being pursued by police vehicles on U.S. Route 395. In this one-minute excerpt, Finicum encounters a police roadblock and drives into a roadside snowbank. Non-lethal weaponry, rubber bullets, and flash bang grenades were employed at the second roadblock. Ryan Payne is hit in the hand by a 40 mm sponge bullet through the open front passenger window as he hesitated, contemplating surrender. A bullet penetrates the roof of the truck, with shrapnel wounding Ryan Bundy in the shoulder. Finicum then quickly exits his vehicle, walks away from his truck, and an OSP officer, pointing a Taser, approaches from uphill to the left of Finicum, while OSP SWAT officers and FBI HRT agents with rifles position themselves to his left. Finicum repeatedly raises and lowers his hands, moving his hands from over his head to toward the inside of his jacket, then turns around slightly to the right to face the driver's side of his vehicle from which he had walked. He is then shot three times in the back by two OSP officers. (One-minute excerpt from 26-minute FBI aerial footage.)

During the first weeks, law enforcement allowed the militants to come and go from the refuge at will. On January 26, the main leaders attempted to drive two vehicles to adjacent Grant County, Oregon, where Ryan Payne was invited by a Canyon City, Oregon, logger to speak at a public meeting at the John Day Senior Center in John Day, Oregon. It was the first time in which the main leaders were traveling together away from the refuge headquarters. State and federal authorities used the opportunity to intercept them with a traffic stop on a stretch of U.S. Route 395, situated away from populated areas.

The militants' convoy consisted of a white 2015 Dodge Ram driven by LaVoy Finicum, followed by a dark-colored Jeep. Vehicles driven by the Federal Bureau of Investigation (FBI) and the Oregon State Police pulled in behind the Jeep. The driver of the Jeep pulled over, and he and his passengers, Ammon Bundy and Brian Cavalier, surrendered peacefully and were taken into custody. Finicum kept driving, followed by the authorities, but eventually stopped with police cars behind his truck. The police launched a round of 1.6-inch (40 mm) foam-nosed pepper spray at the vehicle. Ryan Payne exited Finicum's truck and surrendered peacefully, also surrendering a handgun holstered on his right hip. Shawna Cox, a passenger in Finicum's truck, recorded cell phone video of Finicum shouting to police that he intended to ignore their orders and drive away. Other cell phone video footage shot by Ryan Bundy, another passenger, also showed Finicum taunting officers and daring them to shoot and kill him.

About seven minutes after stopping his truck, Finicum resumed driving north at high speed. Cox, Ryan Bundy, and 18-year-old Victoria Sharp, were still in the rear seat of the truck at the time. They were subsequently pursued by officers and eventually encountered a roadblock about 1 mile (1.6 km) later. An Oregon State Police SWAT member, identified in the trial of FBI agent Astarita as "Officer 1", fired three shots with an AR-15 into Finicum's truck as it approached the roadblock. Finicum steered off the pavement to the left shoulder to evade the roadblock, embedding his truck in a roadside snowbank. Two OSP officers and four FBI agents were posted at the roadblock, with one of the FBI agents nearly being run over by Finicum's truck.

Finicum soon exited and began walking away from his truck, briefly raising and lowering his hands above his head. While Finicum was leaving his truck, an FBI Hostage Rescue Team member allegedly fired two shots one of which entered the truck and ricocheted, inflicting the minor shrapnel wound on Ryan Bundy. OSP officers and FBI agents armed with rifles positioned themselves to his left, while an OSP officer equipped with a non-lethal Taser X2 walked downhill from an embankment toward him. As the officer with the Taser attempted to move within 15 feet (4.6 m) to make the most effective use of the Taser, Finicum turned his body to the left, holding his jacket with his left hand and reaching for a pocket with his right hand. He was then shot twice in the back by an OSP SWA member from the roadblock identified as "Officer 1", and once by "Officer 2", from the pursuit vehicle.

=== Immediate aftermath ===
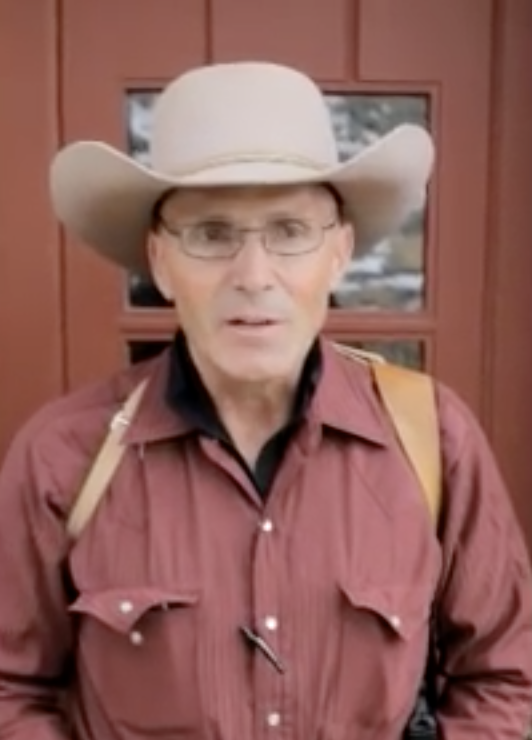
LaVoy Finicum

Immediately after the shooting and arrests, officials stated that Finicum was reaching for a handgun in his pocket when a state trooper shot him. The FBI found a loaded 9mm Ruger SR9, a gift from his stepson, in Finicum's left jacket pocket.

Both of the Bundy brothers and three other militants were arrested. They faced "federal felony charges of conspiracy to impede federal officers from discharging their official duties through the use of force, intimidation or threats" (Title 18, United States Code, Section 372). The driver of the Jeep and Victoria Sharp, a passenger in Finicum's truck, were released without charges. Medical assistance was given to Finicum approximately 10 minutes after the shooting.

Before the video of the action being released, some of the militants and supporters had claimed that Finicum was cooperating with the police when he was shot. This included a claim by Nevada Assemblywoman Michele Fiore (who was not present at the arrest) that "he was just murdered with his hands up". Cliven Bundy was quoted as saying that Finicum was "sacrificed for a good purpose". At a news conference, officials had initially declined to comment on the Finicum shooting because the encounter was still under investigation, but they later released surveillance video of the incident, which officials said shows Finicum reaching for a handgun after feigning surrender, but Finicum's family continued to dispute the nature of the shooting, claiming that he was shot in the back while his hands were in the air, and denied the FBI's assertion that Finicum was armed at the time of his death. Finicum's public autopsy was performed on January 28, but officials withheld the autopsy report from the press until March 8. The Finicum family commissioned a private autopsy, but declined to make the results public.

Three others were arrested in separate actions: Peter Santilli and Joseph O'Shaughnessy were arrested locally, while Jon Ritzheimer was arrested by the FBI in Peoria, Arizona, after he had voluntarily surrendered.

== Fifth and sixth weeks ==
Following the January 26 arrests, the occupation continued. In the early morning hours of January 27, militant Jason Patrick said that women and children had left the occupation, adding that five to six people met and then decided to continue the occupation. Many people reportedly left in a hurry. Hours later, federal and state police forces moved into the region, formed a perimeter around the refuge, and blocked access to it by setting up roadblocks. Only ranchers who owned land near the area were allowed to pass.

The remaining members debated on what to do next, with some angry about the recent events. Through his lawyer, Michael Arnold of Eugene, Oregon, Ammon Bundy on January 27 urged those remaining at the refuge to stand down and go home, statements that were echoed by his wife. Later, several vehicles were seen leaving the refuge before the police perimeter had been set up. Later that day, eight people left the refuge and were met by the FBI and the Oregon State Police at the perimeter. Three militants, including Patrick, surrendered and were arrested, while five other people were allowed to leave the refuge by authorities without incident. By the morning of January 28, four militants remained: David Fry, 27, of Blanchester, Ohio; husband and wife Sean, 48, and Sandra Lynn Anderson, 47, both of Riggins, Idaho; and Jeff Banta, 46, of Yerington, Nevada.

Fry reported that there was a warrant for the arrest of Sean Anderson; the Associated Press reported that Anderson was facing misdemeanor charges in Wisconsin for resisting arrest and drug possession. Fry also added that the others were free to go, but the four were reluctant to leave unless they were all allowed to go freely, and Sean Anderson was not arrested. The FBI reportedly offered a deal where Sean Anderson would be arrested and the others would go free; this was acceptable to Fry and Banta, but not Sandra Anderson, at which point all four made a pact to remain together.

By January 29, the four said they had ended negotiations with the FBI and were planning to remain at the refuge until their supplies ran out. On January 30, the FBI said negotiations were continuing. The militants also claimed that the FBI was shutting down their ability to communicate with the outside world, including locking down their ability to make or receive cell phone calls. The FBI later confirmed this action. The militants were able to maintain contact with Oregon Public Broadcasting from January 31 to February 3, at which point their line of communication was cut. About a week later, David Fry was able to reestablish online communications. On February 3, the remaining four militants, along with twelve of the arrested militants, were indicted for conspiracy to impede U.S. officers, though Kirkland and Stetson were not.

Signs were added at some roadblocks stating that unauthorized protesters or visitors would be subject to arrest if they passed said blocks.

=== Surrender of the last four militants involved ===
At about 4:30 p.m. on February 10, David Fry rode past the police barricades using an all-terrain vehicle before returning to the refuge at high speed. Federal authorities claimed that caused them to begin to surround the refuge at around 5:45 p.m.

Michael Arnold, Ammon Bundy's lawyer, learned of the escalation from a live feed where the remaining holdouts were talking of murder and asking to speak to Nevada Assemblywoman Michele Fiore. Fiore was informed of the request as her flight touched down at the Portland International Airport in Portland, Oregon. Meanwhile, Arnold sent text messages to an FBI negotiator saying: "Fiore is landing now. Can you get her on the phone with the people at the refuge? ... We can slow this down by offering Michele Fiore to talk to them." Fiore stated on a YouTube livestream with the militants that she would try to mediate the situation. While she talked to the four militants, Arnold worked on getting the FBI on the phone. At 7:38 p.m., an FBI agent told Arnold that Fiore was doing a good job and they should go to Burns.

Later that night, it was reported that the remaining militants would be turning themselves in to the FBI at 8:00 a.m. on the following morning. On the morning of February 11, Fiore and Arnold arrived in Burns. Fiore met with Reverend Franklin Graham at the Burns Municipal Airport, who had flown in there on his private airplane. Both were driven to the refuge in an FBI armored truck, with Arnold in a vehicle behind them. Fiore and Graham took turns addressing the militants over a loudspeaker on the truck, and Arnold provided Ammon Bundy's recorded message for Fry to the FBI. By 11:00 a.m., Sean and Sandra Anderson, Jeff Banta, and Fry surrendered to the FBI without incident. The previous night, Cliven Bundy had been arrested by the FBI after deplaning at the Portland International Airport on charges related to events that were alleged to have occurred during the 2014 Bundy standoff. He had flown to Portland to support Fry, Banta, and the Andersons. In February 2016, the elder Bundy was transported back from Portland, Oregon, to Las Vegas, Nevada, to be tried in the United States District Court for the District of Nevada on charges related to the standoff at his Nevada ranch. In the first trial there, two defendants who were not charged in Oregon were convicted of some counts, with the jury deadlocked on other charges against them and four others. The two who received guilty verdicts were sentenced on July 26 and 27. Retrials of the first six and the trials of the remaining eleven defendants were scheduled for June 26 by Judge Gloria Navarro.

== Aftermath ==
=== Further arrests ===
The final arrest of the 26 militants indicted for felony conspiracy was of Travis Cox, and took place on April 12 in Cedar City, Utah. At sentencing, on August 7, 2017, the 20-year-old Cox, the youngest of all those indicted, described his own behavior as "arrogant" and "ignorant". He had served 51 days in pre-trial custody before making bail. U.S. District Judge Anna J. Brown said about him: "I think it's important to note, if my memory is correct, you're the first person who's acknowledged this was a mistake." She sentenced him to two months of house arrest. By August 7, eleven occupiers had pleaded guilty to felony conspiracy to impede federal workers.

In the months preceding the sentencing of Cox, Sean, Sandra, and Dylan Anderson each received a year of probation for trespassing.

A 27th militant, Scott Alan Willingham, was arrested on March 16. Willingham pleaded guilty to one count of theft of government property on May 12. Michael Ray Emry, who had described himself as being an "embedded reporter" for the 3 Percenters of Idaho, was arrested by the FBI on May 6 in John Day, Oregon, on federal weapons charges relating to his possession of a stolen fully automatic .50-caliber M2 Browning heavy machine gun. Willingham told The Oregonian that Emry spent time at the refuge for media purposes and to share his expertise with weapons, and supplied another militant at the refuge with a semi-automatic AK-47 rifle.

=== Trials ===
A total of 27 people involved in the occupation were charged under federal law; of those, 26 have been indicted for a single federal felony count of conspiracy to impede officers of the U.S. from discharging their official duties through the use of force, intimidation, or threats. A number of those under indictment on the conspiracy charge are also charged with a variety of other counts, some of which incur sentences up to life imprisonment, including possession of firearms and dangerous weapons in federal facilities, use and carry of firearms in relation to a crime of violence, depredation of government property (relating to damaging the site "by means of excavation and the use of heavy equipment"), and theft of government property. In addition, several of those under indictment in Oregon have also been indicted separately for their roles in the 2014 Bundy standoff in Nevada.

In January 2016, a court denied bail to Ammon and Ryan Bundy, saying that they were "a flight risk and a danger to the community". The court also denied bail to Ryan Payne, Dylan Anderson, and Jason Patrick. In 2017, prosecutors said they would be asking for a 41-month prison sentence for Payne.

By August 2016, twelve militants pleaded guilty to charges against them, including four of nine militants who were part of Bundy's "inner circle". Of those four, two were reported to be negotiating a resolution to a federal indictment in regards to the Bundy standoff in Nevada. The trials for seven militants, including Ammon Bundy, were scheduled to start on September 7, 2016; while a further seven militants were set for trial beginning February 14, 2017. Charges against the remaining indicted militant, Peter Santilli, were dropped (but he still faces charges in Nevada related to the 2014 Bundy standoff). On August 3, 2016, about 1,500 potential jurors were summoned and asked to complete questionnaires that would be reviewed by the attorneys and parties involved in the September 7, 2016, trials. Judge Anna Brown previously said the case would require an unusually large jury pool.

On October 27, 2016, Ammon Bundy and six other defendants were found not guilty of conspiracy to impede federal officers and possession of firearms in a federal facility by a jury. One defendant was found not guilty of theft of a government-owned truck; the jury was hung on charges of theft of surveillance cameras by another defendant. The judge released five of the defendants, but returned Ammon and Ryan Bundy to federal custody because they also face trial related to the 2014 Bundy standoff in Nevada. At the end of the trial, Marcus Mumford, Ammon Bundy's lawyer, argued with the judge that Bundy should be released immediately on the grounds that the court did not have a detainer, and the United States Marshals Service had no document authorizing Bundy's detention. Both of the Bundy brothers had been ordered to be held without bail in January when they were charged. After the judge admonished Mumford for yelling at the bench, six U.S. Marshals surrounded the defense table. Mumford was tackled and tased when he resisted. A spokesman for the Marshals Service said Mumford was arrested because he "was resisting and preventing Marshals from taking Ammon Bundy out of the courtroom and back into custody". Other lawyers described the Marshals' actions as a sharp break from customary courtroom decorum. On March 13, 2017, federal prosecutors dropped the unusual charges brought against Mumford for his outburst at his client's verdict.

In the trial of the second group of defendants held in February 2017, four remaining defendants were being prosecuted for conspiring to impede federal employees from working at the refuge through intimidation, threats, or fear. Greg Bretzing, the recently retired FBI special agent in charge, testified that several agency informants had been sent into the refuge occupation to assess the situation. One, Mark McConnell, was Ammon Bundy's driver in the convoy to the city of John Day. Drones, fixed cameras, and aerial reconnaissance were used in the surveillance. Bretzing said no military had been involved. He said his top three goals were a peaceable end to the takeover, a return of the refuge to USFWS control, and holding accountable the occupiers who were involved. He said there were "maybe a couple of hundred" FBI agents in Harney County, plus dozens of state and local law enforcement officers, during the refuge takeover. Prosecutors indicated that nine informants had been engaged during the refuge occupation for periods ranging from 2 hours to 23 days, and that none were involved in the initial occupation. Some had carried weapons.

A California blogger, Gary Hunt, said he received a thumb drive and documents containing the names of the nine informants who had been at the Refuge and six others in the case who had not been there; he subsequently posted them online to aid the defense. Judge Brown ordered him to take down such information as to their identities that he had posted, holding him in contempt; he did so just before her deadline when she said she would levy what she termed "more coercive" sanctions.

A neighbor testified that he had heard "hundreds" of shots fired at the refuge's boat launch, and that an occupying tower sentry had aimed a rifle at him and another looked at him through a rifle scope. A video of an occupier meeting found on defendant Jason Patrick's seized camera that was played in the courtroom showed that chaos reigned amongst the occupiers after Finicum's death. "We already have our martyr", one said, and another suggested targeting federal officials, saying, "execute them, their families, and everyone". Defendant Blaine Cooper proposed leaving the refuge in a USFWS fire truck, with others trailing behind. "If they try to (expletive) with us, lay lead down." Both Cooper's father, Stanley Blaine Hicks, and stepmother, Lindalee Hicks, testified that he was not a truthful person. Refuge employees were set to testify that they had received death threats and feared for their lives, but the judge would not allow it, finding it was prejudicial.

In closing arguments, attorneys for Duane Ehmer, Jason Patrick, Darryl Thorn, and Jake Ryan maintained that no conspiracy existed. "It was never there", Michele Kohler, representing Ehmer, told the jury. "The thought was never given to the employees. [The occupiers] went there on a holiday weekend." The second jury brought split verdicts. All four defendants in it were found guilty of at least one charge, and Darrl Thorn of two. Jason Patrick and Thorn, who were on security details, were found guilty of conspiring to prevent federal workers from doing their refuge jobs. Duane Ehmer and Jake Ryan were found not guilty on that count. Ehmer and Ryan were found guilty of willfully damaging the refuge by using a refuge excavator to dig two deep trenches on January 27, 2016. Jurors also found Thorn guilty of possessing a firearm in a federal facility, while acquitting Patrick and Ryan of that same charge. While the jury was in deliberations on the felony cases, Judge Brown held a bench trial for the remaining misdemeanor charges on the last four defendants. The defense contended they did not know, nor were they given proper notice, that they were trespassing. Ehmer's misdemeanor charges were for tampering with vehicles and equipment, removal of property, and trespassing.

Noting that the defendant's guilty plea and low level of involvement in the occupation had mitigated the consequences of his actions, Judge Brown sentenced Geoffrey Stanek on June 26, 2017, to two years' probation and six months' house arrest. For similar reasons, on July 6, 2017, Brown sentenced 23-year-old Tulalip, Washington, tribal employee Eric Lee Flores, to twenty-four months' probation including five months' house arrest. As with Stanek and Flores, probation had been expected for "low-level defendants" Wesley Kjar and Jason Blomgren.

As of August 11, 2017, it was anticipated that Jason Patrick, Joseph O'Shaughnessy, Duane Ehmer, Darryl Thorn, Jake Ryan, Ryan Payne, Jon Ritzheimer, and Blaine Cooper would be sentenced later in 2017 for their felony and misdemeanor convictions related to the Malheur occupation. Thirteen convicted occupiers have agreed to pay a total of $78,000 (approximately $100,604 in 2025) in restitution. Ritzheimer and Payne, after pleading guilty to a federal conspiracy charge, and Patrick, convicted at trial of conspiracy plus several misdemeanor offenses, each agreed to pay $10,000. O'Shaughnessy, Cooper, Brian Cavalier, and Corey Lequieu, after their guilty pleas to conspiracy, agreed to pay $7,000 each. Thorn, tried and convicted of felonious conspiracy to impede federal workers from doing their jobs at the refuge, plus possession of a firearm in a federal facility, and misdemeanors including trespass, agreed to pay $5,000. The least serious offenders, Blomgren, Flores, Stanek, Kjar, and Travis Cox, all agreed to pay $3,000 each. As of the end of August, the final two defendants, Duane Ehmer and Jake Ryan, still awaited sentencing. They both had dug trenches at the refuge and received guilty verdicts for depredation of government property.

On November 16, 2017, Duane Ehmer was sentenced to 12 months and 1 day, with three years of supervised release. On November 21, 2017, Darryl Thorn was sentenced to 18 months in prison. On November 22, 2017, Wesley Kjar was sentenced to two years of probation with 250 hours of community service. On November 30, 2017, Jon Ritzheimer was sentenced to a year and a day in federal prison and must spend another 12 months in a residential re-entry program. On January 24, 2018, Jake Ryan was sentenced to 12 months and a day in federal prison for depredation of government property, trespass, and tampering with government vehicles and equipment. Ryan was also placed on 3 years' supervised release. On February 15, 2018, Jason Patrick was sentenced to 21 months in federal prison followed by three years of supervised release. On February 27, 2018, Ryan Payne was sentenced to 37 months in federal prison along with three years of supervision. On March 15, 2018, Joseph O'Shaughnessy was sentenced to time served and two years of supervised release. On June 12, 2018, Blaine Cooper was sentenced to time served and three years of supervised release. He was also ordered to pay $7,000 in restitution.

=== FBI investigation of scene and damage to refuge ===
Examples of damage caused by the militants
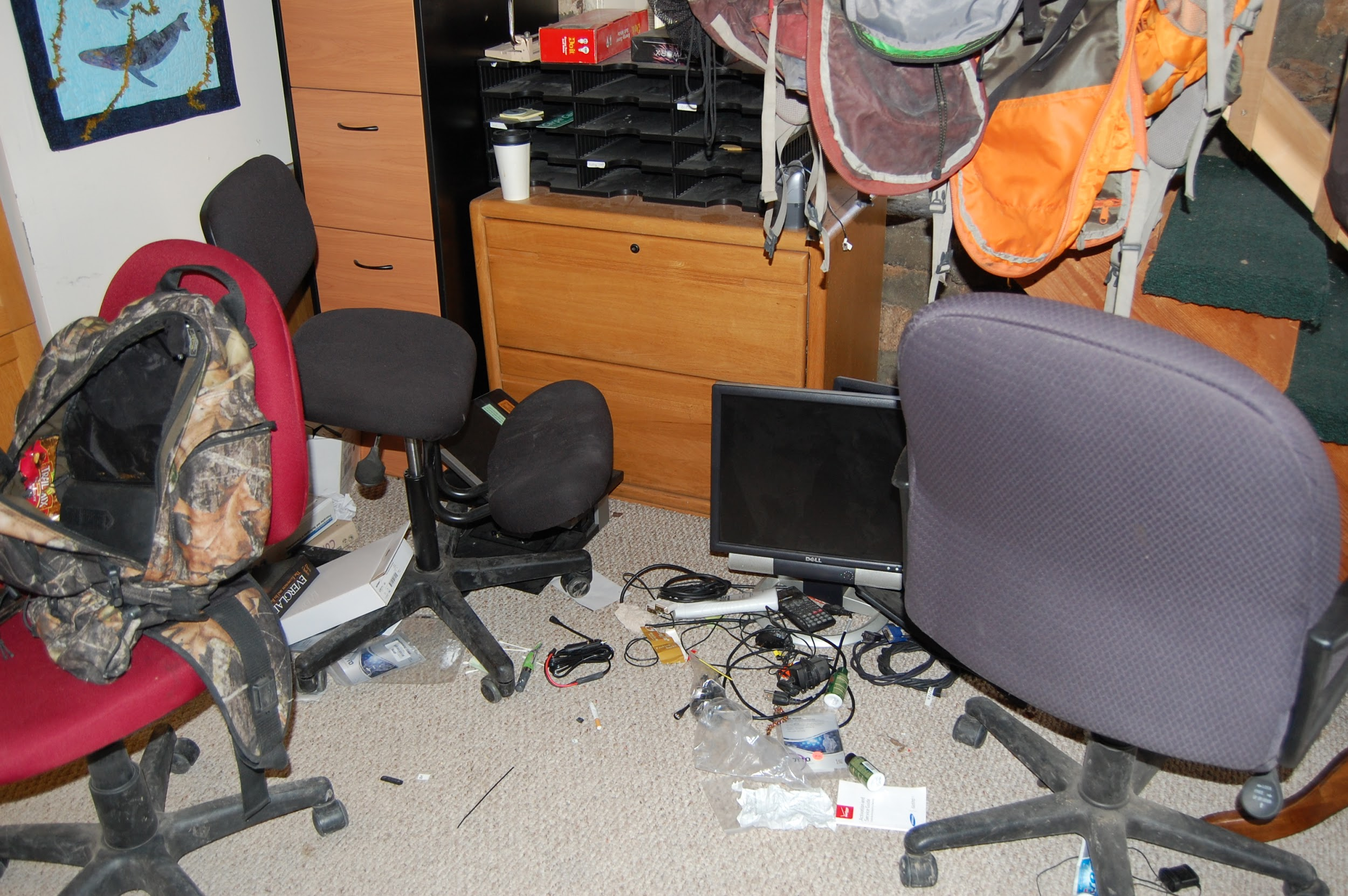
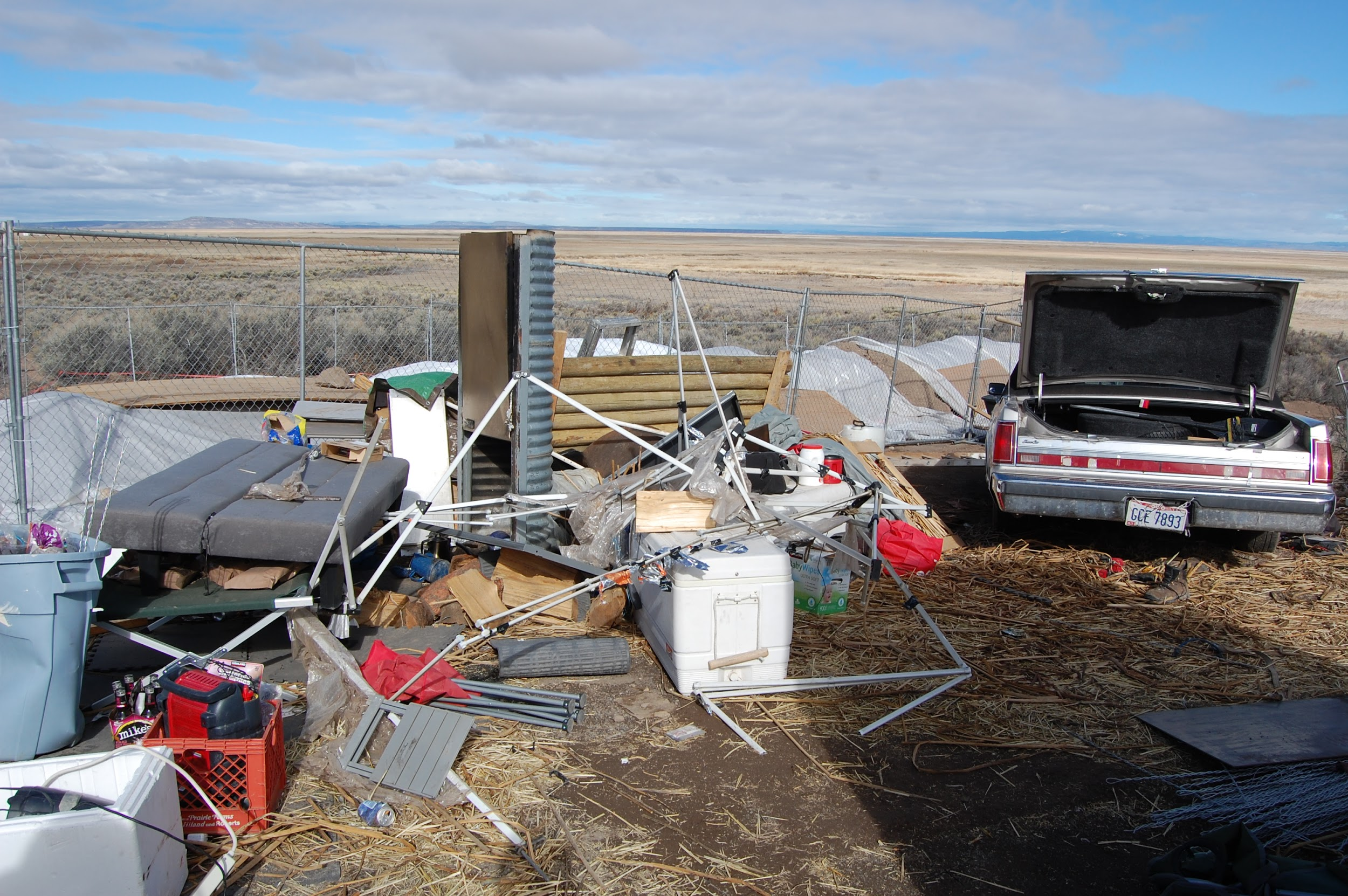
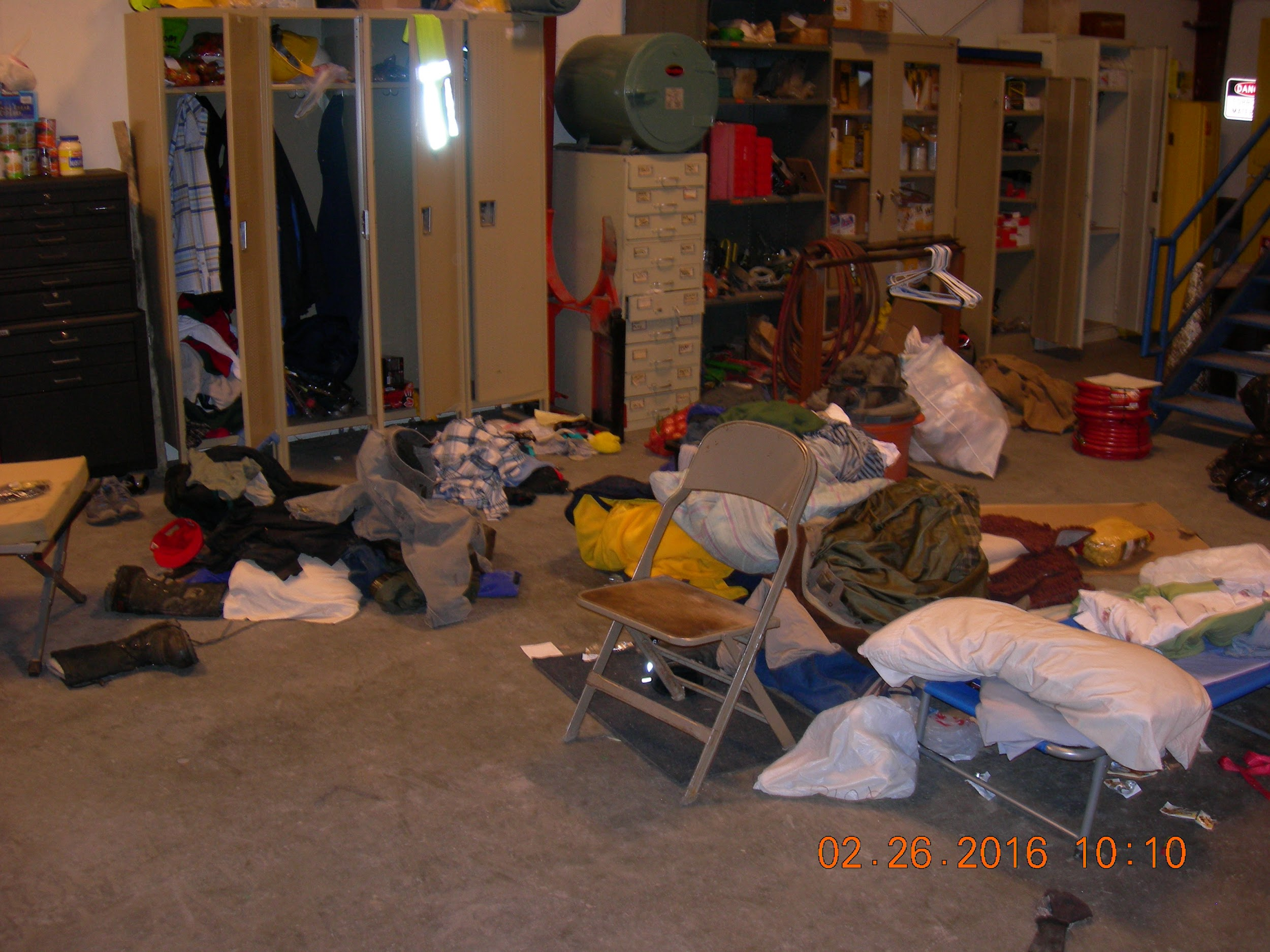

Following the surrender of the last militants, the FBI labeled the entire refuge a crime scene and canvassed the buildings in search of explosives and any previously existing hazardous materials. A collection of firearms and explosives were found inside the refuge. Safes were found to have been broken into, with money, cameras, and computers stolen by the militants. They were also found to have badly damaged tribal artifacts. The FBI's Art Crime Team conducted an archaeological field assessment to determine if the Native American Graves Protection and Repatriation Act or the Archaeological Resources Protection Act of 1979 were violated; additional charges may result if so.

During the occupation, the militants illegally dug a new road using a government-owned excavator, expanded a parking lot, dug trenches, destroyed part of a USFWS-owned fence, and removed security cameras. Some of the refuge's pipes broke, after which the militants, officials said, defecated "everywhere". Investigators found "significant amounts of human feces" at "two large trenches and an improvised road on or adjacent to grounds containing sensitive artifacts" of the Burns Paiute Tribe. A USFWS spokesperson said that the damage risked "the destruction and desecration of culturally significant Native American sites" and called it "disgusting, ghoulish behavior". The Burns Paiute Tribe condemned the damage; tribal council member Jarvis Kennedy described it as if "someone went to Arlington National Cemetery and went to the bathroom on the graves and rode a bulldozer over them". Two of the militants, Sean Larry Anderson and Jake Edward Ryan, were subsequently indicted for "depredation of government property", an offense that carries a potential ten-year jail sentence. A group of 600 volunteers signed up to restore the refuge, after the Oregon Natural Desert Association sought assistance. The FBI also found evidence that the militants used a boat launch area, about 1.5 miles (2.4 km) northeast of the refuge, for firearms training. At the boat launch area, investigators recovered about 1,685 spent shell casings.

The refuge remained closed after the FBI left the site in late February, with the entrance road blocked off from public access by armed officers from the USFWS. The refuge's manager described it as "one big mess" at the end of February. Although he and fifteen other employees at the refuge were able to return to their jobs at the end of February, they found that while there had not been much structural damage to the buildings, there had been a great deal of disruption to files, heavy equipment, and fittings, in addition to the problems caused by a lengthy break in the maintenance of the refuge's infrastructure. Efforts to reduce the population of invasive carp in Malheur Lake are thought to have been set back by three years. While the buildings remained closed for repairs, which are expected to take until the summer, the refuge's lands were reopened to the public in mid-March.

=== Prosecution of FBI agent ===
An FBI agent, W. Joseph Astarita, was alleged to have fired two shots at Finicum's pickup, one penetrating the roof and exiting through a window. Shrapnel from the shot lodged in the shoulder of Ryan Bundy. It was believed that FBI agents may have recovered ejected empty cartridges at the scene. A five-count indictment for alleged lying about the circumstances at the scene of Finicum's death, and for alleged obstruction of justice, was obtained in Portland against Astarita by the Department of Justice. A public defender and retained counsel represented him. He stated that his personal costs of defense had drained his finances. He entered a not-guilty plea. On July 16, 2018, U.S. District Judge Robert E. Jones struck one count of making a false statement and one count of obstruction of justice.

Astarita's trial began in late July 2018, and the prosecution presented its case. Investigators accounted for six of the eight shots taken at Finicum or his truck. Three bullets hit the front of the truck as it sped north at the highway roadblock. Two more shots from that roadblock SWAT member (identified as "Officer 1") in the Astarita trial, struck Finicum in the back as he walked uphill away from his vehicle, toward a third officer who was holding a Taser. Those latter shots were discharged as LaVoy was reaching inside his jacket, shouting, "Shoot me, shoot me." Detectives said they found Finicum's loaded automatic pistol, with a round chambered, in his jacket. A total of six bullets had been fired by two Oregon State Police (OSP) SWAT officers, the first three at the oncoming vehicle. According to investigators, the fatal volley included one round that hit Finicum's back, which was fired by "Officer 2", who had arrived in the chase vehicle. Non-lethal rounds had also been fired at the vehicle, and Ryan Payne was hit in the hand by a rubber bullet. The investigators and prosecutors believed someone else fired two additional shots. One of those two bullets hit the roof of Finicum's truck as he was exiting his vehicle with both hands raised, after he had swerved his truck into a deep snowbank alongside the southbound edge of the roadblock. A second shot missed. Both those interim shots, taken before the fatal volley, were attributed by prosecutors to Astarita, but he had denied firing at all. Extensive forensic evidence and analysis was presented in expert testimony. Deschutes County, Oregon, sheriff's Detective Ron Brown, who was the lead case agent in the Finicum shooting investigation, said he contacted Ryan Bundy, by email, phone and in person, attempting to convince him to have the "metal fragment or whatever it may be" removed from his shoulder, as a bullet fragment could have been "traced back [to] help determine where it came from"/ However, Bundy either refused to have the fragment extracted, or made "completely unreasonable demands", including desiring certain individuals to be criminally charged in the case.

The name of one of the officers who fired on Finicum was inadvertently revealed during the trial and circulated via social media by occupier supporters. The public release of that officer's name was objected to by Finicum's widow. On August 10, 2018, a federal jury which had deliberated for six hours, returned not guilty verdicts on all charges against Astarita.

=== Costs ===
According to an initial analysis by The Oregonian, the occupation "cost taxpayers at least $3.3 million to cover the massive police response, a week of shuttered schools and a long list of supplies ranging from food to flashlight batteries". Most of the cost was for around-the-clock police work: the Oregon State Police spent US$1.2 million on wages, overtime, lodging, and fuel; while an additional US$788,500 was paid for help from other police and government agencies from outside Harney County. The municipalities of Burns and Hines, Oregon, along with Harney County, spent US$521,800. The US$3.3 million figure also includes wages paid to employees who could not work because of the occupation, such as US$425,000 for about 120 BLM employees whose offices were closed. The figure of the costs does not include additional costs, such as lost time in the field, delayed or canceled BLM projects, or added demand for food and services at local nonprofits, such as the Harney County Senior Center. A subsequent estimate stated the cost as at least US$9 million, including US$2 million spent relocating employees who had been threatened by the militants, US$2.3 million on federal law enforcement, US$1.7 million to replace damaged or stolen property and over US$3 million spent by Oregon government agencies.

=== Reopening of refuge headquarters ===
In September 2016, the U.S. Fish and Wildlife Service (USFWS) said the headquarters area would remain closed while they installed security upgrades, which they anticipated could take until spring 2017. Roads and wetlands remained open to the public for birding. By May 8, 2017, the entire Visitor Center, including Center Patrol Road, had been reopened to visitors. Pacific Region USFWS spokesman Jason Holm encouraged during the trial: "Please continue to go there and check birds off your life list. And then, rather than heading into the visitor center, head into Burns, eat at a local restaurant, and provide some boost to their economy as well."

=== Reactions ===
Throughout the occupation, statements were issued by anti-government activists and sympathetic residents, who criticized the militants' tactics. Other statements of condemnation were issued by legal scholars; and federal, state, local, and tribal governments. In the first days, the takeover sparked a debate in the United States on the meaning of the word "terrorist" and on how the news media and law enforcement treat situations involving people of different ethnicities or religions.

Oregon government officeholders, such as Governor Kate Brown and Congressmen Peter DeFazio, Earl Blumenauer, and other top officials in Oregon who had hoped for a more rapid and rigorous federal response, urged criminal proceedings for the militants and expressed praise that the occupation ended without further bloodshed.

Congressman Greg Walden, whose district office is in Bend and incorporates the refuge, said: "We can all be grateful that today has ended peacefully, and that this situation is finally over. Now, life in Harney County can begin to return to normal and the community can begin the long process of healing." Walden complained about allegedly poor federal forest and land management policies during the occupation, and said he would like to see changes to those policies: "We need to foster a more cooperative spirit between the federal agencies and the people who call areas like Harney County home." On June 27, 2018, Walden pleaded for a pardon for the Hammonds on the floor of the House of Representatives, and in a statement issued July 1, Walden quoted Judge Michael Robert Hogan's opinion that sentencing the Hammonds even to the minimum mandatory sentence would "shock the conscious" [sic] and revealed that then-President Donald Trump was considering a pardon for the arsonists.

Harney County held a primary election in May 2016 at which voters turned out in large numbers. All of the winning candidates had opposed the occupation.

=== Civil lawsuits filed in federal court ===
Participants filed at least two civil suits.

A civil rights case filed by passengers of Finicum's truck was dismissed. On January 31, 2018, passengers in Finicum's truck, Ryan Bundy, Shawna Cox, and Victoria Sharp along with Ryan Payne filed their own civil rights lawsuit in United States district court in Portland, Oregon, against Astarita, Bretzing, and other officials. The plaintiffs allege they were the victims of an "armed ambush, excessive-force seizure, conspiracy, battery and assault and seeks a common law jury to award damages of up to $1 million (~$1.26 million in 2025) per count. On July 19, 2018, U.S. Magistrate Judge Patricia Sullivan granted a motion to dismiss Ryan Bundy and Shawna Cox as plaintiffs. On September 6, 2019, Chief United States District Judge Michael W. Mosman dismissed all counts in the lawsuit.

As of July 24, 2020, a wrongful death case brought by LaVoy Finicum's family remains pending. The case was filed on January 26, 2018, in United States district court in Pendleton, Oregon. Named as defendants were the United States, the Federal Bureau of Investigation, Oregon State Police, the Bureau of Land Management, Oregon governor Kate Brown, Greg Bretzing, former FBI special agent in charge in Portland, indicted FBI agent W. Joseph Astarita, U.S. Senator Ron Wyden of Oregon, former U.S. Senator Harry Reid of Nevada, Harney County Sheriff Dave Ward, Harney County commissioner Steven Grasty, the Center for Biological Diversity, and multiple unnamed officers. The lawsuit seeks more than $5 million in damages for Finicum's wife, Jeanette; each of their 12 children; and his estate. Kieran Suckling, executive director of the Center for Biological Diversity, called the suit a "bizarre, incoherent, yet nonetheless dangerous, attack on free speech", Disposition of the case and parties was reviewed by U.S. Magistrate Judge Patricia Sullivan, who, on July 24, 2020, made recommendations to the district court regarding each of the defendants. The judge recommended that all defendants be dismissed except the Oregon State Police. The family will have an opportunity to respond to the dismissal recommendations before a district judge makes a final decision on which, if any, of the defendants will remain parties to the lawsuit On August 5, 2021, U.S. District Judge Michael Mosman dismissed most of the civil claims brought in the suit.

== See also ==
- Occupation of Alcatraz
- Patriot movement
- Posse Comitatus
- Sagebrush Rebellion
- Taylor Grazing Act of 1934
- Utah Transfer of Public Lands Act
- W. Cleon Skousen
- Wise use movement
- Wounded Knee incident
