= Oregon Natural Desert Association =

American non-profit organization

Coordinates: 44.050964°N 121.315856°W

- Oregon Natural Desert Association Inc.
- Abbreviation: ONDA
- Formation: 1987; 39 years ago
- Type: Nonprofit
- Tax ID no.: 94-3098621
- Legal status: 501(c)(3)
- Headquarters: Bend, Oregon
- Executive Director: Ryan Houston
- Website: https://onda.org/

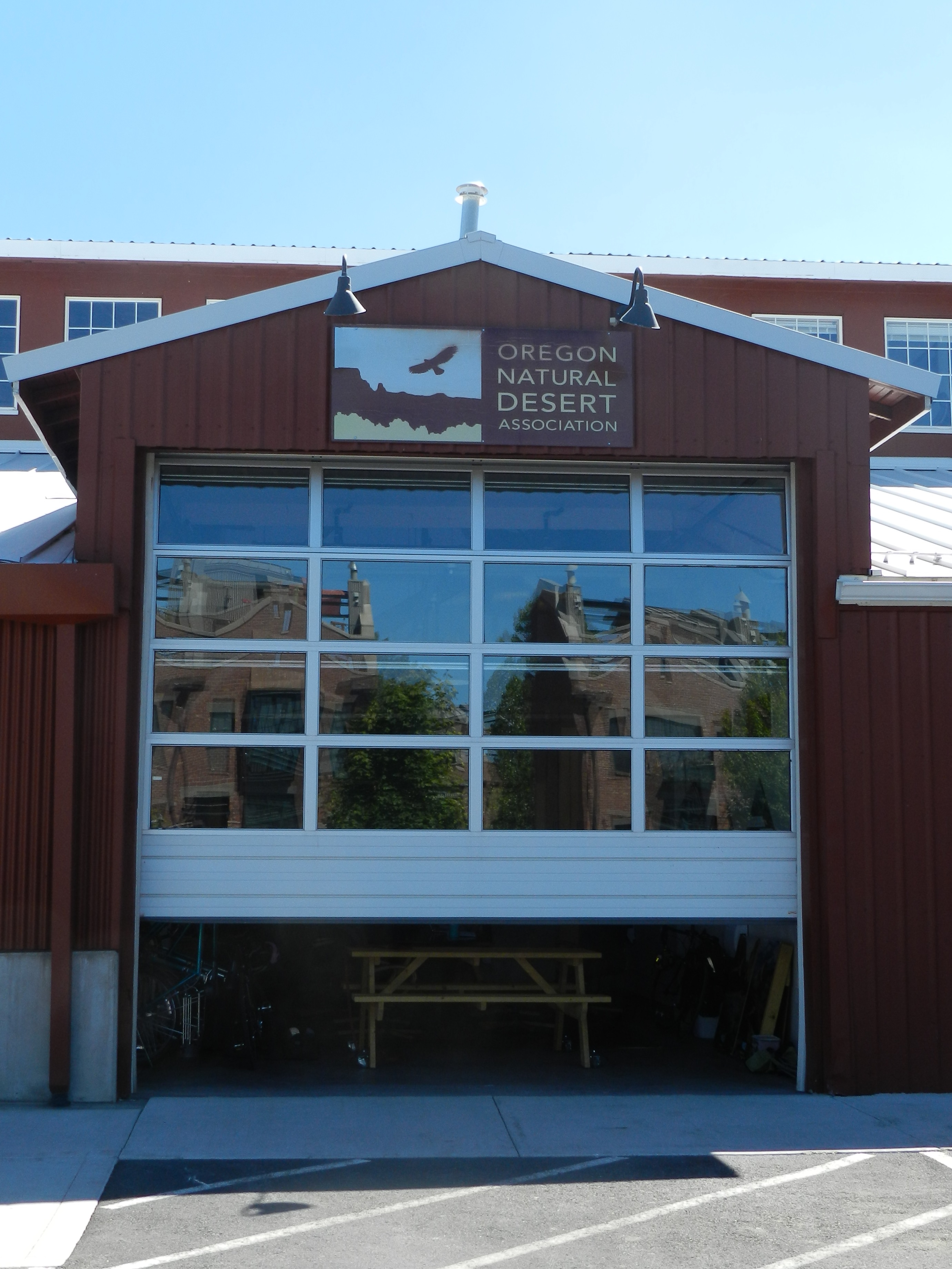
Facade of the Oregon Natural Desert Association in Bend, Oregon.

The Oregon Natural Desert Association (ONDA) is a tax-exempt 501(c)(3) organization with a mission to protect, defend, and restore the wild lands of eastern Oregon. It was founded in 1987.

== Campaigns ==
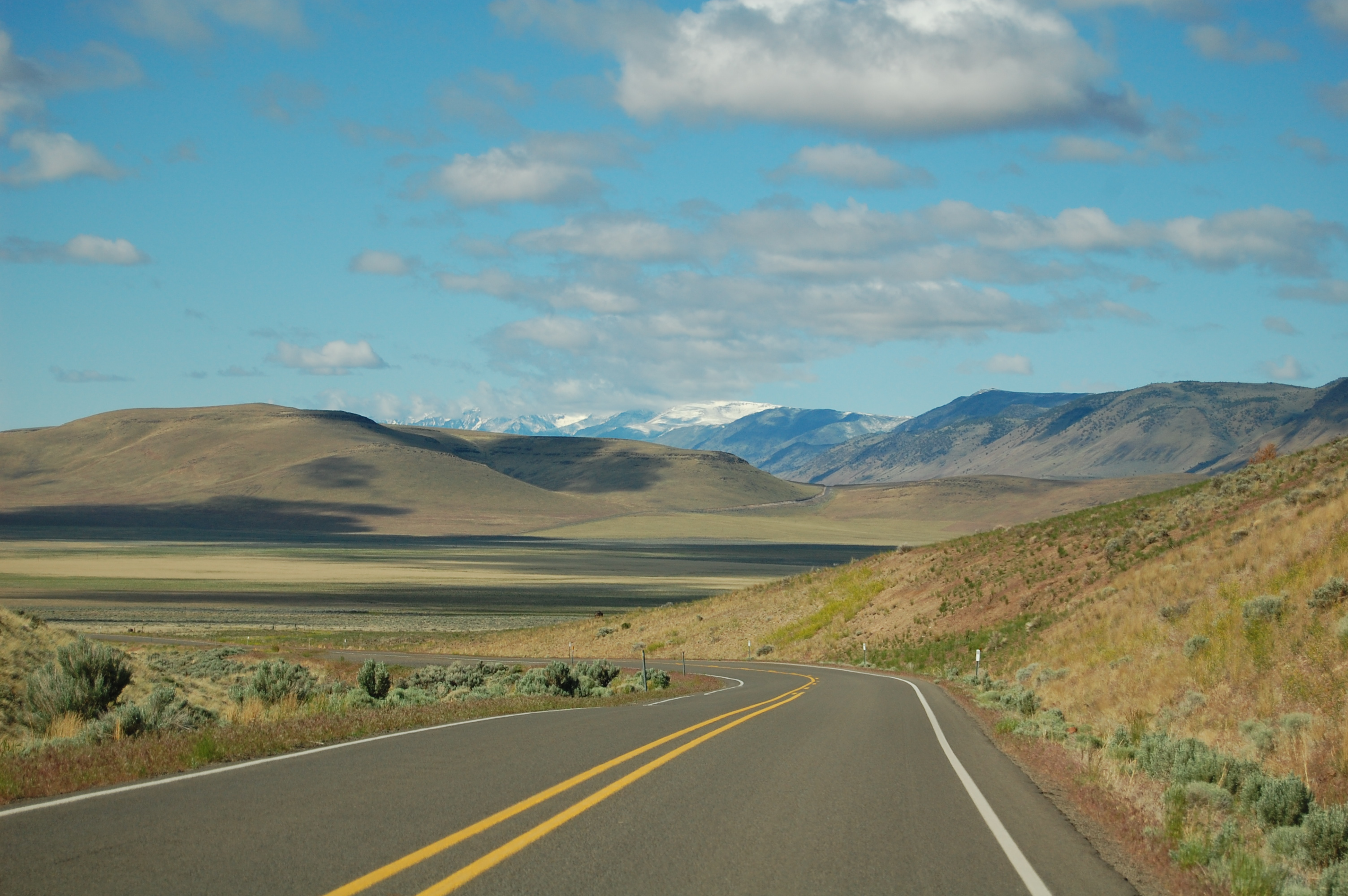
The north flank of Steens Mountain, seen from the Steens Highway

ONDA's efforts have included protecting habitat for wildlife at Hart Mountain National Antelope Refuge and on the Owyhee River. Recently the group has focused on the creation, mapping and marking of a wilderness hiking trail from Bend, Oregon to the Idaho border. This trail, now known as the Oregon Desert Trail, has won accolades from outdoor groups and publications.

Beginning at the end of January 2016, ONDA, along with other Oregon-based conservation groups, began efforts to mobilize volunteers who are interested in assisting environmental restoration at the Malheur National Wildlife Refuge after the militant occupation there ends. ONDA announced that more than 600 people from all over the Pacific Northwest responded to their calls.
