= Citizen grand jury =

Self-created committee bodies in the USA

In the United States, a citizen grand jury is a non-actionable, non-governmental organization that assumes a responsibility upon itself to accuse an individual or groups of individuals of having committed actionable crimes, in a similar aim as that of official grand juries. Such organizations have been organized by those who espouse conspiracy theories regarding certain events or the individuals who are accused by the citizen grand jury, and most citizen grand jury applications to official judiciary systems at the federal, state, or local and municipal level tend to be thrown out for lack of evidence.

Modern citizen grand juries were organized in the 2000s to accuse government officials of complicity in the September 11 attacks, and others were organized in the late 2000s and early 2010s regarding the accuracy of President Barack Obama's status as a natural-born citizen.

The states Kansas, New Mexico, North Dakota, Nebraska, Nevada and Oklahoma permit citizens to request—through signature collection—that a judge summon a grand jury to investigate alleged crimes. With the grand jury, however, the jury will determine whether criminal charges will be filed against suspects of the alleged crimes rather than the citizen who made the request.

== 9/11 citizen grand juries ==
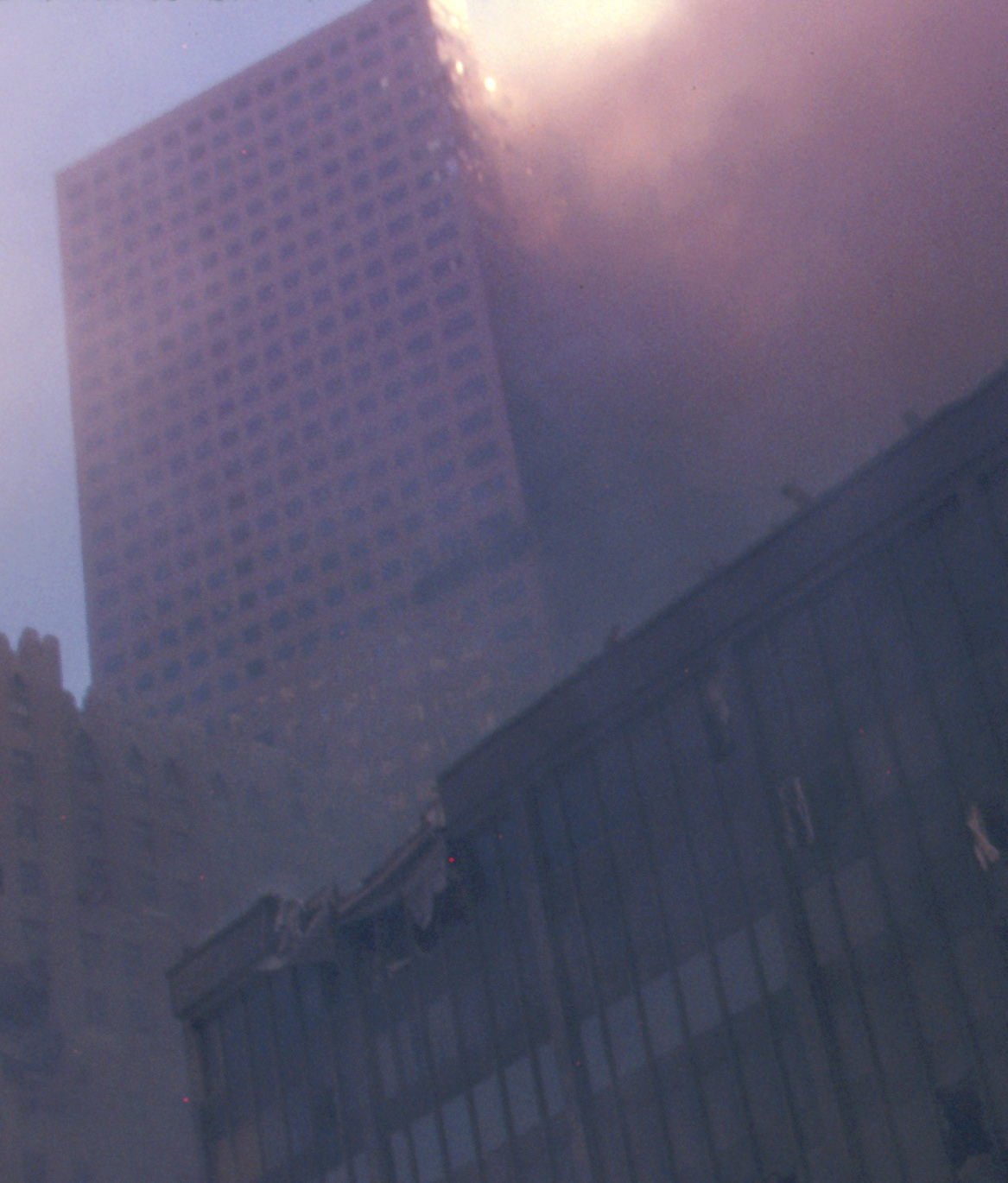
World Trade Center Building 7 on fire before its collapse on 9/11

The earliest so-called 9/11 citizen grand jury, the 23-member "Los Angeles Citizens' Grand Jury on the Crimes of 9/11/01", was organized in 2004 by activist Lynne Pentz. By October of that year it had launched an "indictment" accusing George W. Bush and other administration officials of complicity and foreknowledge of the attacks. Among those offering testimony at the event were Webster Tarpley, Barbara Honegger, Don Paul, Jim Hoffman and Christopher Bollyn. Similar citizen grand juries were organized in San Diego later in the 2000s.

== Obama citizenship citizen grand juries ==
Some campaigners, led by Georgia activist Carl Swensson, have sought to, "finally expose the conspiracy behind President Obama's birth certificate," by forming what they term "citizen grand juries" to indict Obama. The "citizen grand juries" are based on the Fifth Amendment's premise that "no person shall be held to answer for a capital, or otherwise infamous crime, unless on presentment or indictment of a Grand Jury."

Although the activists managed to hand out copies of "indictments" to Congressional staff, the courts have not regarded the "citizen grand juries" favorably. In June 2009, a group of 172 campaigners declared themselves to be a "Super American Grand Jury" and voted to charge Obama with treason and accused him of not being a U.S. citizen. Chief Judge Royce C. Lamberth of the United States District Court for the District of Columbia dismissed the "indictment" on July 2, 2009, and declared "[T]here is no authority under the Rules of Procedure or in the statutes of the United States for this court to accept [a presentment]... The individuals who have made this presentment were not convened by this court to sit as a grand jury nor have they been selected at random from a fair cross section of this district. Any self-styled indictment or presentment issued by such a group has no force under the Constitution or laws of the United States."

In 2013, a citizen grand jury formed by Larry Klayman "convicted" Obama of fraud.

== White supremacist citizen grand juries ==
In 2011, there was an influx of white supremacists to Montana's Flathead Valley region. Karl Gharst, a white supremacist active in the Flathead area, publicly announced plans to form a citizen grand jury in Kalispell to indict the Montana Human Rights Network, a local anti-racism organization. Gharst, previously active in the Aryan Nations and currently founder of a group called Kalispell Pioneer Little Europe, claimed that the MHRN was a "Jewish Defamation Organization" and part of a "Jewish terrorist network".

== Occupation of the Malheur National Wildlife Refuge ==
Members of Ammon Bundy's group calling themselves "Citizens for Constitutional Freedom" attempted to create citizen grand juries and threatened indictments against a number of officials, both federal and local, for "multiple constitutional crimes." The tactics included bringing in self-proclaimed "judges" who did not have legal authority under the court system. One of the self-proclaimed 'judges' threatened newsmedia with "the crime of felony" for attempting to report on the proceedings.

== Robert Mueller ==
In 2019, Klayman convened a citizen grand jury against special counsel Robert Mueller regarding the Justice Department's investigation into Russian interference in the 2016 United States elections.

== Joe Biden and his family ==
In 2019, Klayman vowed to convene a citizen grand jury to "indict" Obama's vice president Joe Biden, and his son Hunter Biden, for their involvement with Burisma Holdings.

In 2023, Klayman's citizen grand jury "convicted" President Biden, his son Hunter Biden, and President Biden's brother, James Biden.

== See also ==
- Kangaroo court
- Lawfare
- Show trial
