= Jon Ritzheimer =

American political activist and former naval officer

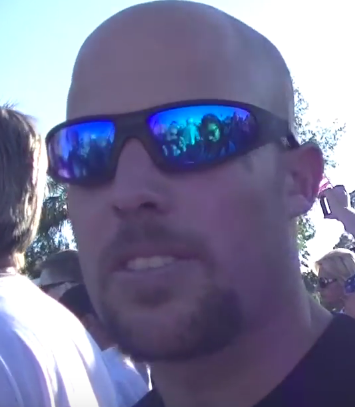
- Ritzheimer pictured in 2015
- Born: October 31, 1983 (age 43)
- Citizenship: United States
- Organization(s): 3 Percenters, Oath Keepers
- Known for: Occupation of the Malheur National Wildlife Refuge
- Children: 2

Jon Eric Ritzheimer (born October 31, 1983) is an American political activist. He is affiliated with the 3 Percenters and formerly associated with the Oath Keepers group, and has used social media to declare his opposition to Islam and the Bureau of Land Management.

== Early life ==
A former United States Marine and veteran of the Iraq War, Ritzheimer grew up in Lakeside, California. While serving in Iraq he received a certificate of commendation for engaging three suspected insurgents in 2005. According to Ritzheimer, he was discharged from the Marine Corps for violating its tattoo policy. (Note: The Corps' tattoo policy prohibits tattoos on arms below the elbow, on legs below the knee, on the head or neck, as well as any tattoo on any part of the body that is "sexist, racist, vulgar, anti-american, anti-social, gang related, or extremist group or organization related.")

== Activities ==
Ritzheimer first attracted national attention in May 2015 when he began pacing in front of a mosque near his residence in Phoenix, Arizona, wearing a T-shirt that had "Fuck Islam" imprinted on it. Later that month, he organized what media characterized as an "anti-Muslim protest" outside the mosque that drew 250 people. During an interview on CNN about the protest, Ritzheimer compared himself to the signers of the United States Declaration of Independence. He later started a GoFundMe campaign to raise $10 million which would be used, he said, to either finance his life in hiding (he had earlier alleged "they're calling for lone wolves to come and behead me") or to challenge John McCain for United States Senate.

In June 2015, Ritzheimer posted a video to his Facebook page. In the video, in which he appeared shirtless, Ritzheimer claimed "hackers have ruined my life", alleging that he was a victim of identity theft by persons who had publicly exposed his social security number and credit card information. He went on to explain that he was also suffering from malnutrition and that his earlier wearing of the "Fuck Islam" T-shirt was "distasteful" and "stupid".

By September, the group Oath Keepers reported they were in the process of expelling Ritzheimer from their organization after he suddenly announced detailed plans to "arrest" United States Senator Debbie Stabenow for treason. In response, Ritzheimer said he was withdrawing his membership from the group. The U.S. Capitol Police, which is responsible for the protection of members of Congress, meanwhile announced they had started coordinating with police in Michigan, Stabenow's home state, to monitor attempts by Ritzheimer or confederates to carry out the threat of "arrest".

The following month, the Federal Bureau of Investigation issued a warning to local law enforcement about Ritzheimer after he posted a YouTube video of himself brandishing a firearm and declaring his intent to confront staff at The Islamic Post, a small newspaper in Hancock, New York, in response to the paper's labeling him as "an American Taliban". According to Ritzheimer, he was contacted by the New York State Police, who admonished him not to attempt to cross the New York border.

In January 2016, Ritzheimer participated in the armed occupation of the Malheur National Wildlife Refuge. During the occupation, Ritzheimer complained about people sending him sex toys in the mail, observing that the senders "just hate, and hate, and hate, and hate." In what The Oregonian described as a "tantrum", a YouTube video shot by Ritzheimer showed him pushing boxes of sex toys off a table inside one of the occupied buildings. A Southern Poverty Law Center spokesperson described Ritzheimer's ascendance as very disturbing, saying "I think he's potentially very dangerous. He often comes across as literally unhinged. He's rabid about everything. If I was a member of federal law enforcement up there in Oregon, I would be very concerned."

Ritzheimer operated an ecommerce website called Rogue Infidel, which sold T-shirts and bumper stickers emblazoned with "Fuck Islam" and other slogans. He has said that he supported Donald Trump in the 2016 U.S. presidential election.

== Arrest and legal proceedings ==
Ritzheimer voluntarily surrendered on January 26, 2016, to local authorities in his hometown of Peoria, Arizona. He has been charged with a federal felony of conspiracy to impede officers of the U.S. from discharging their official duties through the use of force, intimidation, or threats—an offense attracting a sentence of up to ten years' imprisonment. On March 9, 2016, Ritzheimer was also charged with a variety of counts, including possession of firearms and dangerous weapons in federal facilities, use and carry of firearms in relation to a crime of violence—an offense that incurs a sentence of five years minimum to life, consecutive—and theft of government property.

On June 10, 2016, U.S. District Judge Anna J. Brown dismissed one of two firearms charges against Ritzheimer and seven other militants. She cited that the underlying conspiracy charge does not meet the legal definition of a "crime of violence" as defined by Ninth Circuit case law.

On August 15, 2016, Ritzheimer pleaded guilty to a federal conspiracy charge as part of a plea bargain deal. On November 30, 2017, Ritzheimer was sentenced to a year and a day in federal prison and must spend another 12 months in a residential re-entry program.

== Personal life ==
Ritzheimer is married and has two children. During the occupation he reportedly lived off of veterans disability checks and his wife's working income.
