= Timeline of the occupation of the Malheur National Wildlife Refuge =

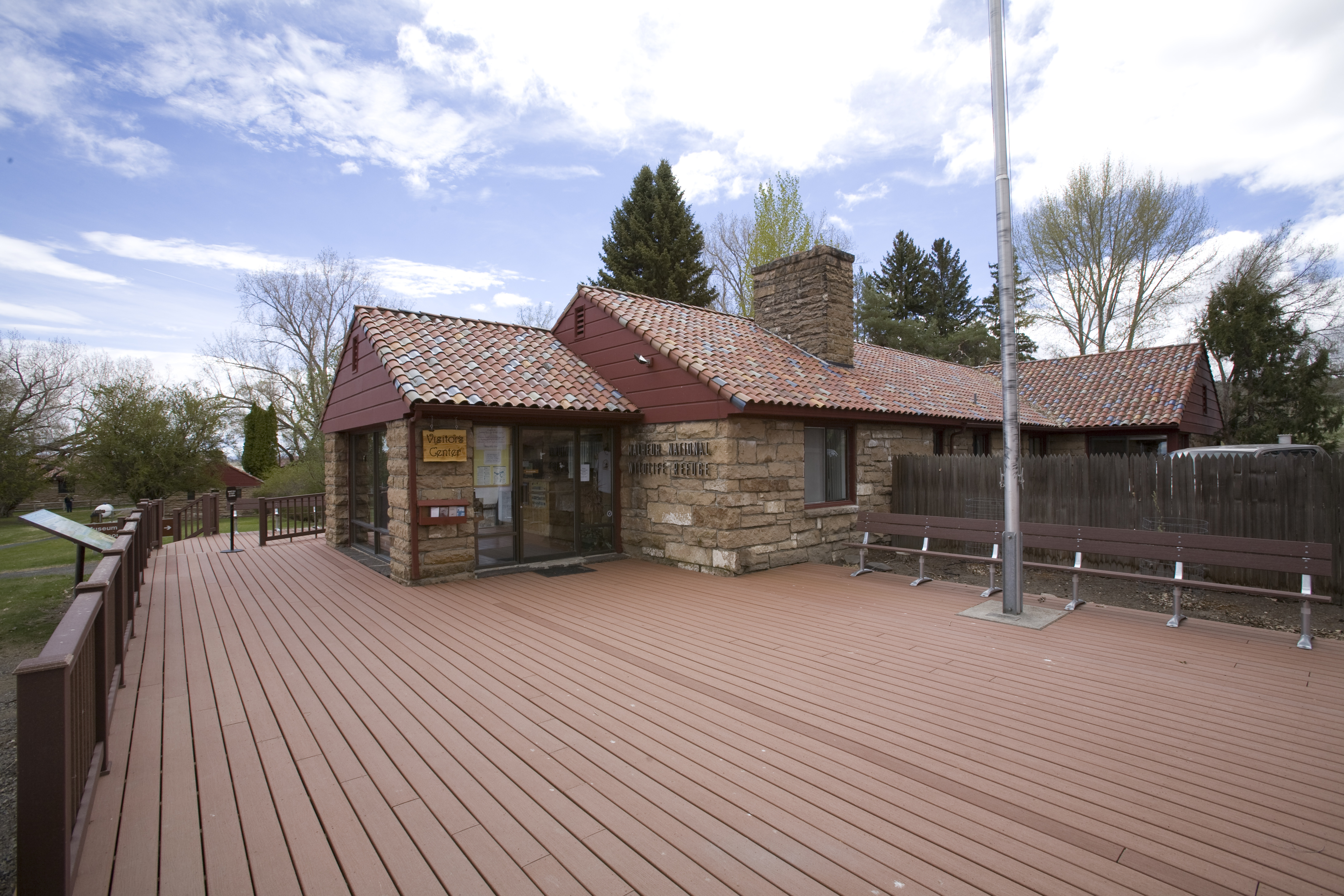
The headquarters of the Malheur National Wildlife Refuge (pictured here in 2008) were occupied by militants in early 2016.

This timeline of the occupation of the Malheur National Wildlife Refuge describes the progression of events leading up to, during, and after the occupation. The 2016 event played out over several weeks of public statements, occupying activity, and rallies.

== Prelude (December 2015 – January 2, 2016) ==
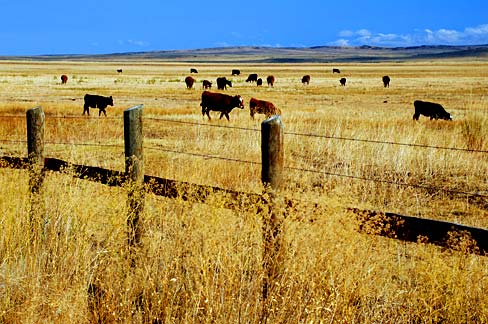
Cattle grazing in Harney County. Ranchers must pay fees for their cattle to graze on federal lands.

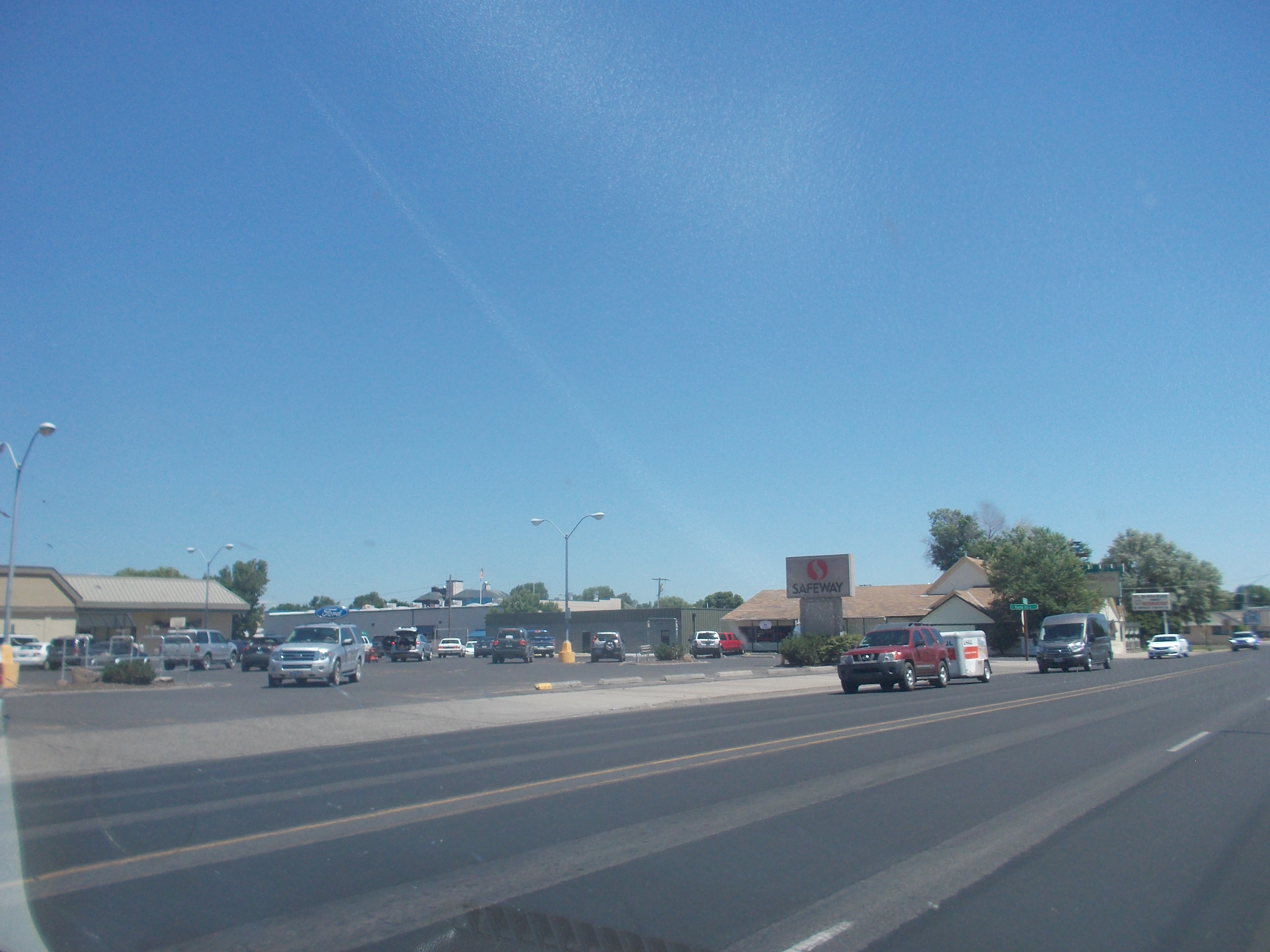
The Safeway parking lot in Burns, Oregon where participants gathered prior to the occupation.

Ammon Bundy, the leader of a group now calling themselves Citizens for Constitutional Freedom, said he began leading the occupation after receiving a divine message ordering him to do so.

By early December 2015, Ammon Bundy and Ryan Payne had set up residence in Burns, Oregon. The same month, they organized a meeting at the Harney County Fairgrounds to rally support for their efforts. At the meeting, a "committee of safety" was organized to orchestrate direct action against the sentences of Dwight and Steven Hammond, the central figures of a case of arson on federal land. According to that group's website, the Harney County Committee of Safety considers itself "a governmental body established by the people in the absence of the ability of the existing government to provide for the needs and protection of civilized society" (during the American Revolution, committees of safety were shadow governments organized to usurp authority from colonial administrators).

On December 30, 2015, U.S. Fish and Wildlife Service (USFWS) staff members at Malheur National Wildlife Refuge (MNWR) were dismissed early from work. With tensions rising in nearby Burns, supervisors left staff with the final instruction not to return to the refuge unless explicitly instructed. Meanwhile, some residents of Burns reported harassment and intimidation by private U.S. militia members. According to the spouses and children of several federal employees and local police, they had been followed home or to school by vehicles with out-of-state license plates.

On January 1, 2016, a privately organized public forum held at the Harney County Fairgrounds was attended by about 60 local residents and members of militias. A Burns-area resident who organized the event described it as an opportunity to defuse tensions that had been simmering between locals and out-of-town militia in the preceding days. According to press accounts, the event lasted about two hours and "shifted from sometimes profanity-laden declarations to agreements the Hammonds had been too harshly treated and that a peaceful rally might do some good."

At noon on January 2, a rally of about 300 gathered in the parking lot of a Safeway supermarket in Burns, organized by the Pacific Patriots Network (PPN), a militia umbrella organization that includes the 3 Percenters of Idaho. Following 40 minutes of speeches, the crowd marched one mile to the home of Dwight and Steven Hammond, stopping briefly en route to protest outside the sheriff's office. The crowd then returned to the same Safeway and broke up, the entire march lasting approximately ninety minutes. According to KOIN, the CBS-affiliated television station in Portland, Oregon, there was "no visible police presence at any point."

== First week ==
=== Initial occupation (January 2) ===
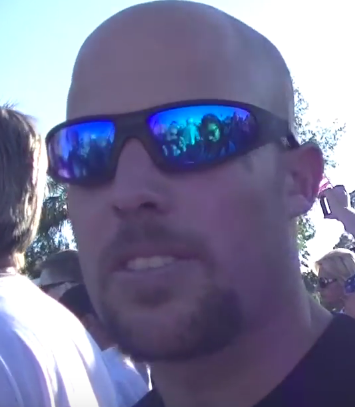
Jon Ritzheimer, pictured here in May 2015, was identified as one of the leaders of the militant occupation.

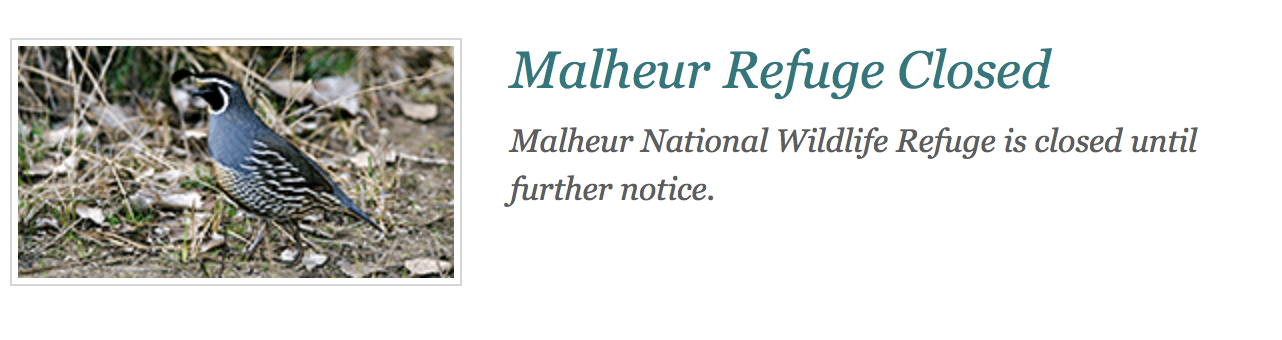
Notice posting on the MNWR's website stating its closure "until further notice."

Before the protest crowd broke up, Ammon Bundy announced to the crowd his plan to occupy the Malheur National Wildlife Refuge, and he encouraged people to join him. His announcement surprised a PPN rally organizer, who later stated he felt betrayed. Ammon and Ryan Bundy—along with armed associates—separated from the crowd and proceeded to the refuge headquarters, located 30 miles (48 km) south of Burns. The militants settled into the refuge and set up defensive positions. There, they began occupying unstaffed buildings on the property and set up a roadblock on an access road. In a video posted to his Facebook page, Ammon Bundy called on supporters to converge on the facility which he described as "the tool to do all the tyranny that has been placed upon the Hammonds." According to The Oregonian, Ryan Bundy stated that the militant group wants the Hammonds to be released and for the federal government of the United States to relinquish control of the 1.4 million acres (5,700 km^{2}) Malheur National Forest. Right before the occupation began, the militants notified the Harney County Sheriff's Office and also contacted a utility company with the intention of taking over the refuge's electric and other services, according to a motion to dismiss and memorandum filed by Ammon Bundy's lawyers on May 9.

At 4:02 p.m. on January 2, the official Facebook page of the Malheur National Wildlife Refuge posted an update that read: "The Refuge will be CLOSED until further notice." The U.S. Fish and Wildlife Service, which operates the MNWR, said that all of its staff were safe and the refuge was closed until further notice. The Bureau of Land Management announced that its office in Burns would be closed until further notice.

As of January 2, the militia leaders claimed to have 150 armed personnel available at the Malheur National Wildlife Refuge. A reporter personally witnessed "no more than a dozen" potential combatants. A separate report by public broadcasting network Oregon Public Broadcasting (OPB) put the number of the militants at the MNWR at "between six and 12." In a statement posted to the Facebook page of the 3 Percenters of Idaho (one of the militias identified by media as involved in the takeover), the group disclaimed involvement, stating that the seizure was "carried out by a small group of persons who chose to carry out this takeover after the rally."

The Harney County Sheriff's Office initially reported that the Oregon State Police (OSP) was "handling the incident." At the same time, a spokesperson for the Federal Bureau of Investigation (FBI) said the agency was "aware" of the situation. Later that same day, The Guardian observed that there was no visible law enforcement presence in the area. Authorities had not approached the refuge or blocked access to it.

Maureen Peltier, a soldier with the Washington Army National Guard who traveled to Burns to participate in the protest, reported to media on January 3 that the militias who had seized control of the MNWR were in high spirits and had "a good security team." Peltier also said that the militants were moving children onto the MNWR grounds and had called upon like-minded persons to join them.

The leader of the occupation, Ammon Bundy, and some other Oregon militants are members of the Church of Jesus Christ of Latter-day Saints (LDS Church) and have cited the Mormon scripture as justification for defying government authority. One member of the group told the media that his name is "Captain Moroni," a reference to a heroic warrior figure in the Book of Mormon. After the occupation began, the LDS Church issued a statement strongly condemning the seizure and stated that the armed occupation can in no way be justified on a scriptural basis. The event was connected with the lengthy and complex history of conflict between Mormons and the federal government; Alex Beam describes the Bundys as "Mormon religious fanatics."

=== January 3 ===
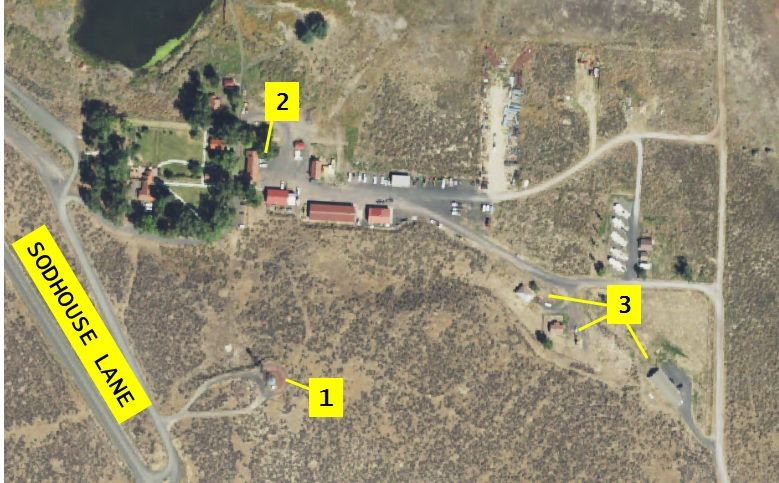
This USGS satellite image of the MNWR headquarters complex is labeled to show key locations referenced in news reports of the militia occupation: (1) fire lookout used by militants as watch tower, (2) MNWR offices used as headquarters building, (3) residential buildings used by militants as barracks and canteen.

At 11:00 a.m. on January 3, Ammon Bundy called a press conference at the MNWR headquarters building. During the conference, Bundy said the ultimate goal of the militants was to "get the economics here in the county revived" for logging and outdoor recreation, and claimed that they were being supplied by area residents. Despite the smaller estimates of militia at the refuge in early press reports, a reporter from The Oregonian who attended the press conference said he believed there were roughly 20 to 25 people present and that the militants had deployed into defensive positions with elements manning a roadblock, guarding the headquarters entry, and stationed in a fire lookout usually used to watch for forest fires. Additional militiamen occupied the facility's buildings.

Later that day, Harney County Sheriff David M. Ward issued a statement asking residents to avoid the scene and saying that the militants aimed to overthrow the government. He explained, "These men came to Harney County claiming to be part of militia groups supporting local ranchers, when in reality these men had alternative motives, to attempt to overthrow the county and federal government in hopes to spark a movement across the United States." The following day, Ward said at a press conference:

I want to directly address the people at the wildlife refuge: You said you were here to help the citizens of Harney County. That help ended when a peaceful protest became an armed and unlawful protest. The Hammonds have turned themselves in. It is time for you to leave our community. Go home, be with your own families and end this peacefully.

On the evening of January 3, Oregon State Police officials announced that a multi-agency command post would be established the following day to coordinate a response to the situation. The command post was ultimately set up at Lincoln Junior High School in Burns, which had been closed as part of a district-wide school shutdown. U.S. Senator Ron Wyden of Oregon said that he had been briefed by the special agent in charge of the Portland, Oregon, FBI field office and said that federal, state, and local law enforcement were monitoring the situation in detail.

=== January 4 ===
On January 4, the FBI assumed the lead role in the investigation and announced that it was working with local and state authorities to seek "a peaceful resolution to the situation." The statement also read: "Due to safety considerations for both those inside the refuge as well as the law enforcement officers involved, we will not be releasing any specifics with regards to the law enforcement response." It was later announced by Sheriff David Ward that the Harney County Court had officially appealed for police reinforcements from the sheriffs of neighboring counties. Meanwhile, media reported that the entrance gates to Burns Municipal Airport had been blocked by the Oregon State Police using patrol cars and armored vehicles. Despite the increased presence in and around Burns, by the end of the day on January 4, media noted that no overt police presence was visible in the 30 miles (48 km) between the town and Malheur National Wildlife Refuge headquarters, seemingly underscoring the cautious approach authorities sought to take.

In taking a cautious approach, federal authorities were thought to "be mindful of prior clashes with people who did not recognize government authority," such as the Ruby Ridge incident in 1992 and the Waco siege in 1993. These events "ended in bloodshed and became rallying cries for antigovernment militants," in contrast to similar incidents which ended peacefully, such as the 1996 standoff with the Montana Freemen, which was resolved by extended negotiations leading to the group's surrender.

Steven E. Grasty, the judge-executive of Harney County, emailed Ammon Bundy requesting that he leave Malheur National Wildlife Refuge. According to Grasty, he received "roughly 100 'F you'" emails in reply.

On January 4, the militants announced a formal name for their group, Citizens for Constitutional Freedom. At 1:37 p.m. the same day, Dwight and Steven Hammond voluntarily reported to Terminal Island FCI in California to begin serving the remaining four years of their prison sentences. In an interview with Oregon Public Broadcasting, Ammon Bundy's brother, Ryan, said that he and the other militants would leave the property "if the county people tell us to." Following the interview, Sheriff David Ward issued a statement requesting the Bundys and others to leave. In response, Ryan Bundy said he wasn't convinced Ward spoke for all of the people in the county. In a public meeting held on January 6 at the Harney County Fairgrounds, nearly every attending person, according to Oregon Public Broadcasting, raised their hands on a question asking if the militants should leave. Ward then announced he would be willing to provide passage to the militants to the county line if they would depart voluntarily.

All schools in Harney County closed on January 4 as a safety precaution taken by the local school district. On January 5, the county sheriff's office announced it would host a community meeting to "discuss safety concerns and the disruptions" on the next day.

=== January 5–7 ===
On January 5, The Guardian, quoting a confidential federal government source, reported that the U.S. Fish and Wildlife Service was preparing to cut power and telephone lines to the Malheur National Wildlife Refuge, while authorities would seal roads leading to the MNWR headquarters compound. Temperatures in Harney County at the time were well below freezing and the move would be designed to flush out the militants. Speaking of a potential police siege, Ammon Bundy said militants were "ready and waiting" and, in response to the reports, the group began making preparations to repel a potential attack, including moving logs and construction equipment across access roads to the refuge. An Oregon Public Broadcasting report later discredited The Guardian's story and the militants "stood down" from a higher state of readiness.

Sheriff David Ward, meanwhile, told reporters that steps were underway to break the occupation and that the measures authorities were taking would "not be visible to the public." Ward also reported law enforcement personnel from nine Oregon counties had begun converging to Harney County in response to the Harney County Court's plea for help, but that they would be used to bolster courthouse security and increase the visible police presence in populated areas, rather than respond to the situation at the MNWR. Among the agencies to send personnel were the sheriffs of Wasco, Clackamas, Marion, Deschutes, Crook, Umatilla, Multnomah, Baker, and Linn Counties, along with the Burns Paiute Tribal Police. The sheriffs of Benton and Yamhill Counties both declined a request to deploy some of their deputies to Harney County due to what they described as existing manpower shortages. Ward assured residents on January 4 that deputies from outside the county would not "harass the good citizens of Harney County" and called on residents at a community meeting at the Harney County Fairgrounds on January 6 to form a "united front." In an interview with Oregon Public Broadcasting on January 5, he said that any resident providing supplies to the militants would only be "prolonging the situation."

Two Reuters reporters spent the night of January 5 with the militants at the refuge headquarters. They found that Ammon and Ryan Bundy had moved into the office of a federal biologist. The brothers told the reporters that the biologist would be allowed access to the office, but only to retrieve her personal belongings. Regarding the biologist's work, Ryan Bundy said, "She's not here working for the people. She's not benefiting America. She's part of what's destroying America." At his Oregon trial, Ammon Bundy testified that he never intended to prevent federal employees from doing their work at the refuge. The next day, Kenneth Medenbach's "hybrid counsel," Matthew Schindler, asked Bundy how the biologist would be able to conduct her work at the refuge if he was using her office and sitting in her chair. Bundy replied, "I didn't really think of it."

A fistfight erupted at the MNWR on the evening of January 6 when three members of a group calling themselves Veterans on Patrol attempted to enter the headquarters compound. According to the group, they had arrived to convince women and children and Ryan Payne to leave. Instead, they were repelled by militants, leaving one member of the Veterans on Patrol with a black eye.

On January 7, the Harney Electric Cooperative began disconnecting power to the fire guard station in the MNWR in the community of Frenchglen. According to officials, the move was done to prevent militants from relocating to other sites within the refuge. Later that day, Sheriff David Ward, accompanied by the Sheriff of Malheur County, Oregon, and the Sheriff of Tillamook County, Oregon, met with Ammon Bundy and Ryan Payne. The meeting occurred in what was described as "one of the most remote spots in Oregon," at a location along Lava Bed Road, approximately 20 miles (32 km) from the site of the occupation. In the meeting, which lasted between five and ten minutes, Ward repeated his earlier offer to provide safe passage to the militants to the Harney County line. Bundy rejected the offer, saying he and his confederates would hold out until the federal government had surrendered all of its land holdings to local residents.

== Second week ==
=== January 8–11 ===
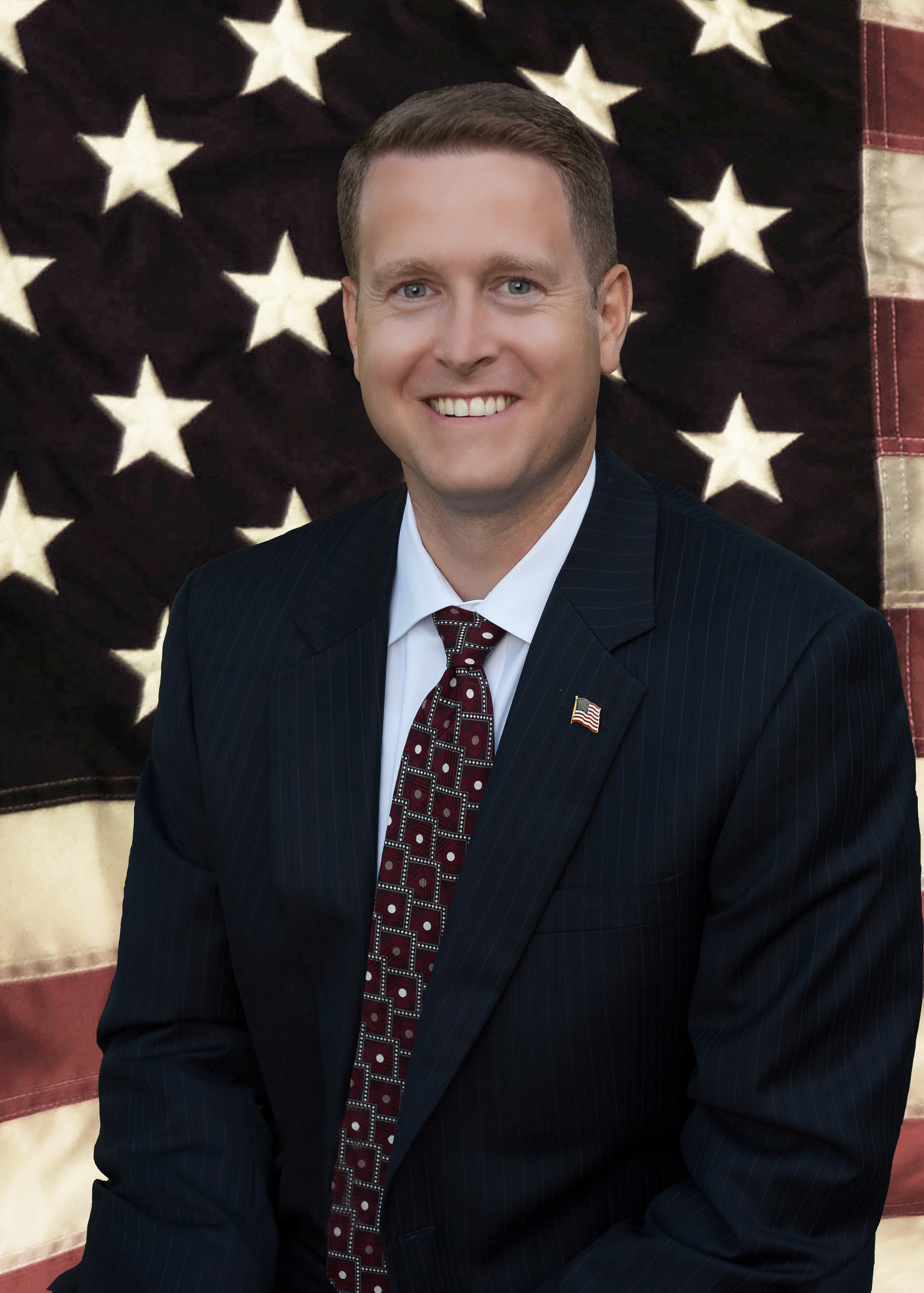
Matt Shea, a member of the Washington House of Representatives, was part of a coalition of five out-of-state politicians to meet with the militants on January 9 over objections expressed by local officials.

On the morning of January 8, in preparation for a rumored protest that was being organized in Burns, sheriff's deputies began fortifying the county courthouse, including ring-fencing it with concrete barriers. Oregon Public Broadcasting reported "heavily armed sheriff's deputies" patrolling in the immediate vicinity of the building. Later that day, members of other militias arrived in the area, met with the militants, and asked them to establish a perimeter around the occupied area to avoid a "Waco-style situation."

A number of other militia and anti-government groups, including multiple armed men, arrived in Burns, the nearest town, and at the refuge. The views of the militants to these new groups were mixed.

On January 8, the 3 Percenters of Idaho, an Idaho-based militia who had earlier disclaimed support for the occupation, announced it was sending some of its members to "secure a perimeter" around the MNWR compound and prevent a repeat of the Waco siege. Bundy welcomed the arrival of the additional militants, saying, "If they weren't here, I'd worry [about a law enforcement raid]." However, hours after their arrival at the refuge on the morning of January 9, the convoy of new militants from the Pacific Patriots Network, led by Brandon Curtiss, president of the 3 Percenters of Idaho, were asked to leave by Utah attorney Todd MacFarlane, who acted as a mediator. The new militants left the refuge that afternoon.

In what The Oregonian characterized as "the latest bizarre turn of events," Oregon Representative Dallas Heard traveled to the refuge on January 9 with a coalition of five out-of-state elected officials that included Judy Boyle, Heather Scott and Sage Dixon of Idaho, and Graham Hunt and Matt Shea of the State of Washington. The trip was described by Heard as a "fact-finding mission" and occurred over the objections of Oregon Representative Cliff Bentz and Harney County Judge Steven Grasty. The coalition returned to Burns after a brief meeting with the militants.

By January 10, to the apparent exasperation of local officials, an influx of armed groups and individuals was rotating through Burns, with some declaring they were there to support the armed occupation, others to try to convince the militants to quit, and still others with undefined purposes. At that point in the occupation, militants continued to come and go from the refuge without apparent hindrance, with a militia spokesman noting that the Bundys had left the refuge for a period of time that morning to attend church. Some militants, meanwhile, left the occupation completely.

On January 11, schools in the Harney County School District 3 were reopened, albeit with heightened security. Regional offices of the United States Forest Service (USFS) and Bureau of Land Management (BLM) remained closed, with employees remote working to the extent possible; officials said there was no schedule for reopening the offices. Meanwhile, the militants used a government-owned Caterpillar 257B tracked loader to take down an 80-foot (24 m) stretch of barbed-wire fence between the refuge and an adjacent ranch, apparently to give the adjacent ranch access to land that had been blocked for years. However, the ranch owners said the militants did not have their permission to take down the fence and have since repaired it. The militants began searching through government documents stored at the complex in order to find alleged proof of government wrongdoing toward local ranchers. The computers on site have also been used by David Fry to make a website for the occupation called Defend Your Base. Fry also claimed that his online comments appearing to sympathize with Adolf Hitler and the Salafi jihadism militant group Islamic State were "just a joke."

Sheriff David Ward also expressed concern that the militants were intimidating federal employees, including following individuals home and observing them there.

=== January 12–15 ===
On January 12, a militant announced that the group will hold a community meeting on January 15 to explain their motives and inform residents when they will leave; however, the group later stated that the meeting would no longer take place. The same day, Bruce Doucette, the owner of a computer repair shop in Denver, Colorado, and a self-proclaimed judge, announced that he would convene a "citizens grand jury" to charge government officials with various crimes. Present via cell phone during a previous militia rally in Colorado in 2015, Doucette, who has not attended law school nor ever held judicial office, referred The Denver Post to his Facebook page when asked for documentation of his magistracy. Doucette's claims to be a judge are consistent with legal frauds often practiced by the sovereign citizen movement and other anti-government movements. The Southern Poverty Law Center noted a similarity between Doucette's planned trials and the false trials held by the Montana Freemen group in the 1990s.

Oregon members of Backcountry Hunters & Anglers, a sportsmen's group, removed tarps the militants used to cover an official refuge sign. On January 12, members of the group also posted notices to social media that they viewed the occupation as "extremist attempts to grab our public lands" and predicted that public access to the lands would quickly cease to exist if the militants were successful in their goals.

On January 13, the Harney County fire chief, Chris Briels, announced his resignation and decision to take sides with the militants.

On January 14, Ammon Bundy announced that the militants planned a longer stay and were reaching out to nearby county sheriffs for support. Michael Ray Emry, speaking for Bruce Doucette, threaten to hold "a trial with the redress of grievance" against county and other government officials. Oregon Public Broadcasting's John Sepulvado described the threats as an intimidation tactic commonly used by sovereign citizen groups who "act in extralegal means. They'll harass those who have been indicted, they'll stalk them, they'll kidnap them in some cases."

Harney County Judge Steven Grasty, Sheriff David Ward, and other county officials were served false legal documents by the militants.

A man from Hamilton, Montana, was arrested on January 14 on charges of being a "felon in possession of a firearm."

On January 15, the Oregon State Police made the first arrest of a militant since the occupation began. 62-year-old Kenneth Medenbach, of Crescent, Oregon, was apprehended at the Safeway in Burns while driving a government vehicle stolen from the refuge headquarters; a second vehicle stolen from the refuge was also recovered at the scene. Both vehicles bore altered markings of "Harney County Resource Center" on the doors, the unofficial name the militants have used for the refuge since shortly after the takeover. Mendenbach previously had a history of troubles with the law, including a prior conviction for illegal occupation of government land that included setting up a makeshift shelter with booby traps and a stockpile of explosives, and was on bail awaiting trial for a similar charge from 2015. It was reported that Medenbach used many legal quirks and filed legal documents in a way consistent with the anti-government sovereign citizen movement ideology. Medenbach had previously told news reporters that "I feel the Lord's telling me to possess the land, and I can legally do it, because the U.S. Constitution says the government does not own the land."

On January 15, the Oath Keepers anti-government militia group warned of a prospective "conflagration so great, it cannot be stopped, leading to a bloody, brutal civil war" if the situation declined to violence.

Birders and other environmental and outdoors groups protested against the loss of access to the refuge caused by the occupation.

== Third week ==
=== January 16–18 ===
Militant numbers continued to grow to "several dozens" according to one report or about 40 in another.

On January 16, Robert "LaVoy" Finicum, an occasional spokesman for the militants, told The Washington Post that "[i]t needs to be very clear that these buildings will never, ever return to the federal government," reiterating the group's demands for the federal government to cede ownership of the wildlife refuge.

Also on that same day, a group of environmental protesters confronted the militant group. The shouting between the groups became heated after Peter Santilli used a megaphone to shout down the counter-protesters.

The militants began to vandalize the property, which local community leaders characterized as an attempt to provoke violent confrontation.

On January 17, brothers Jake and Zach Klonoski started a group known as "Getting Occupiers of the Historic Oregon Malheur Evicted," or "G.O.H.O.M.E.," aiming to restore federal control of the refuge. By the end of that day, they had received over US$13,000 in donations, which they stated will go to organizations such as the Burns Paiute Tribe and Southern Poverty Law Center.

=== January 19–22 ===
On January 19, Ammon Bundy and several other militant occupiers appeared unannounced at a community meeting in Burns without addressing the crowd. Attendees of the meeting were roughly split between supporters and opponents of the occupation, with some jeering Bundy to leave. Harney County Judge Steven Grasty directly addressed Bundy with the statement, "It is time for you to go home," provoking cheers from the crowd. Others expressed support for the occupation and its goals. An open letter from the staff of Malheur National Wildlife Refuge was read to the crowd, marking the first time the staff had broken their silence since the occupation began. The letter was posted to the refuge's official Facebook page; it expressed a reminder to the community that the staff members are part of said community too, that their silence was out of a desire not to make the situation more inflamed, and that the employees hoped to return to their homes and jobs within the community soon. The next morning, Ammon Bundy gave a 90-minute lecture at the refuge firehouse to his supporters describing his views on law and the United States Constitution, which he claims are justification for lending control over land rights from the federal level to the state level.

The Harney County Sheriff's Office released a detailed summation of the ongoing troubles with the militants. This included notations of the arrests and citations made to militant members, including a felon in criminal possession of a weapon, armed individuals wearing body armor present under false pretenses who have harassed law enforcement and the media, and a detailed timeline of the group's broken promises to leave when asked to. The statement concluded with a reminder that the group is "considered by law enforcement (local, state and federal) to be criminals -- and they need to vacate the refuge."

Writer Ursula K. Le Guin penned a letter to the editor condemning The Oregonian's apparent bias in covering the events as "inaccurate" and "irresponsible," and referred to the militants as "bullyboys" and "a flock of Right-Winged Loonybirds."

A video released by the militants showed them inspecting a locked storage room for archaeological artifacts held in agreement with the Burns Paiute Tribe, an Indian nation in Harney County. The Tribe subsequently delivered a letter demanding that the federal government prosecute the militants under the Archaeological Resources Protection Act of 1979 and a "protection against bad men" requirement of the tribe's treaty with the U.S. government dating back to 1868. Tribal statements referenced the stored artifacts as well as the group's indiscriminate bulldozing of areas where tribal artifacts may be buried.

Another heavily armed group of militants arrived at the compound on January 20, with one militant telling local news, "God wants us here."

Also on January 20, Oregon Governor Kate Brown appealed to President Barack Obama for a quick resolution to the occupation, writing, "I conveyed the harm that is being done to the citizens of Harney County by the occupation, and the necessity that this unlawful occupation end peacefully and without further delay from federal law enforcement."

On January 21, Ammon Bundy started negotiations with the FBI. Despite demanding to talk to an agent directly, he had a brief discussion with a negotiator on the phone after showing up unexpectedly at the local airport. He discussed about relinquishing federal government control of the refuge as well as the releases of Dwight and Steven Hammond. He proclaimed that he would not talk about or negotiate a resolution to the militant occupation until the demands were met. Bundy then agreed to meet with the FBI again on the next day. However, when the meeting occurred, Bundy left prematurely after the agent present declined to hold their negotiations in front of the media.

== Fourth week ==
=== January 23–25 ===
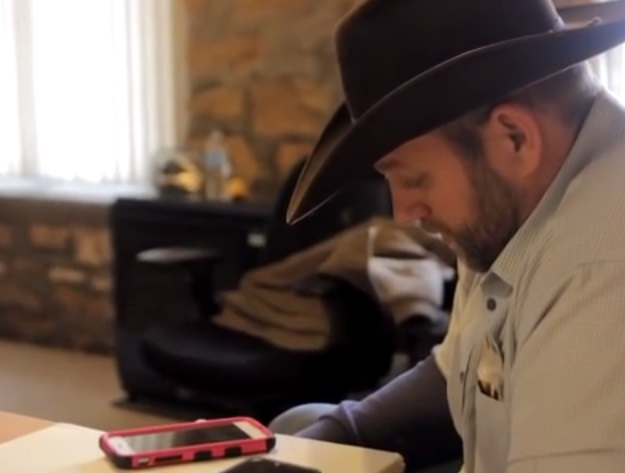
Ammon Bundy speaks to an FBI negotiator via speaker phone at the MNWR on January 21.

An online petition was started demanding the government arrest Ammon Bundy, and urged President Barack Obama to bring an end to the occupation. By January 23, over 17,000 signatures had been collected. That same day, about 40 people gathered to protest the occupation about 5 miles (8 km) from the refuge. Ongoing problems were reported in the local education system.

Also on January 23, the militants hosted a press conference at the refuge, promising news reporters that an Oregon rancher and one from New Mexico would be present to sign papers renouncing their federal grazing permits. Only one rancher, Adrian C. Sewell of Grant County, New Mexico, a convicted felon, renounced his federal grazing permit at the conference. The Oregon rancher was absent.

Surprising other law enforcement officials, Grant County Sheriff Glenn Palmer made a statement saying that freeing the Hammonds "would be a start" in ending the occupation.

On January 25, a man on his way to the occupation was arrested in Hines, Oregon, for driving under the influence of intoxicants and resisting arrest. Armed with a pellet gun, he claimed that he was planning on becoming a bodyguard for Ammon and Ryan Bundy, and also threatened to kill federal agents.

=== January 26 ===
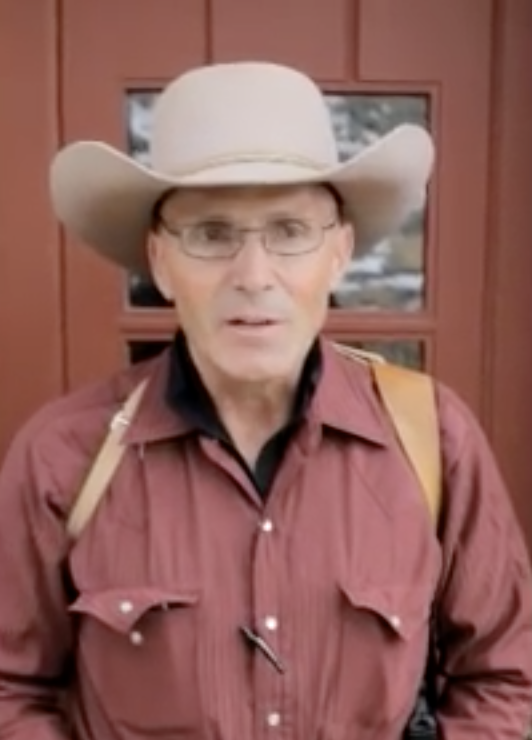
Robert "LaVoy" Finicum

FBI surveillance footage shows Robert "LaVoy" Finicum's truck being pursued by police vehicles on U.S. Route 395. In this one-minute excerpt, Finicum encounters a police roadblock and drives into a roadside snowbank. Finicum immediately walks away from his truck, and an OSP officer with a Taser approaches from his right, while OSP officers and FBI agents with rifles position themselves to his left. Finicum moves his hands from over his head to grab his jacket, then turns around to the left to face the way he had walked from. He is then shot three times in the back by two OSP officers. (One-minute excerpt from 26-minute FBI aerial footage.) The FBI report that they recovered a handgun from Finicum's jacket pocket.

Around 5:00 p.m. on January 26, state and federal authorities conducted a traffic stop on U.S. Route 395. George T. Bretzing, the special agent in charge of the FBI's Portland field office, later announced that the traffic stop was set up deliberately as an effort to arrest militants, having been set up far from residents to avoid collateral damage. At the traffic stop, Ammon and Ryan Bundy, along with four other militants (Brian Cavalier, Shawna Cox, Robert "LaVoy" Finicum, and Ryan Payne), were stopped while on their way to a community meeting in John Day, Oregon, where Payne was invited by a Canyon City, Oregon, logger to speak. A confrontation between the militants, OSP officers, and FBI agents ensued, leaving one militant, Finicum, dead and Ryan Bundy with a minor wound. Both of the Bundy brothers and the three other militants were arrested, and two other individuals were released without charges. They will face "federal felony charges of conspiracy to impede federal officers from discharging their official duties through the use of force, intimidation or threats." The charges are per Title 18, United States Code, Section 372, a statute originally created during the American Civil War to facilitate arrests of anti-government conspirators. Reports say that the group were pulled over and everyone present obeyed orders to surrender except Finicum and Ryan Bundy, with shots then being fired. Medical assistance was given to Finicum approximately 10 minutes after the shooting.

Prior to the video of the action being released, some of the militants and supporters had claimed that Finicum was cooperating with the police when he was shot. This included a claim by controversial Nevada Assemblywoman Michele Fiore who was not present at the arrest that "he was just murdered with his hands up." Cliven D. Bundy, father of Ammon and Ryan Bundy, was quoted as saying that Finicum was "sacrificed for a good purpose."

Three other militants were arrested in separate actions: Peter Santilli and Joseph O'Shaughnessy were arrested locally, while Jon Ritzheimer was arrested by the FBI in Arizona after handing himself in.

=== January 27–28 ===
All eight arrested militants faced a felony charge of conspiracy to impede officers from their official duties by force, intimidation, or threats. All but Ritzheimer were transferred to the Multnomah County jail.

Despite these arrests, the occupation at the refuge continued. Early on the morning of January 27, militant Jason Patrick said women and children had left the occupation. Various officials called for the remaining militants to end the occupation. Later in the day on January 27, federal and state police forces moved into the region, formed a perimeter around the refuge, and blocked access to it by setting up roadblocks. One militant still in the compound said that five or six remained inside the refuge. The remaining members debated on what to do next, with some angry about the recent events. They also continued recording a livestream that had been started at some point during the occupation. At one point, a militant proclaimed to viewers that the authorities were coming to kill the occupiers. In one video uploaded to YouTube, Sean Larry Anderson urged supporters to join them inside the refuge and to kill any police officers standing in their way.

On January 27, Ammon Bundy, through his lawyer, urged those remaining at the refuge to stand down and go home. Later, several vehicles were seen leaving the refuge before the police perimeter had been set up.

Three more militants, including Patrick, turned themselves in at the perimeter on January 27, while five other individuals were allowed to leave the refuge by authorities without incident. Reports stated that five to seven militants remained, though that number had dropped to four by the following morning, including one woman. One of the remaining militants reported that there is a warrant for the arrest of one of their own; the Associated Press reported that Sean Anderson was facing misdemeanor charges in Wisconsin for resisting arrest and drug possession. The militant added that the others are free to go. However, they refused to do so unless they are all allowed to go freely. They were identified as David Lee Fry of Blanchester, Ohio; husband and wife Sean Larry Anderson and Sandra Lynn Anderson of Riggins, Idaho; and Jeff Wayne Banta of Elko, Nevada.

At an initial court appearance, seven of the militants were denied bail as possible flight risks.

On January 28, the four remaining militants announced that they are ready to leave the refuge, but still fear arrest.

Also on January 28, Lisa Bundy, the wife of Ammon Bundy, reiterated her husband's statement in an audio-recording, urging the remaining militants to follow his wishes and return home to their families.

=== January 29–30 ===
As of January 29, the four remaining militants remain in contact with the FBI and reiterated their wish to leave despite their fears of being arrested. The FBI reportedly offered a deal where Sean Anderson, the militant with the arrest warrant placed on him, would be arrested and the others would go free; this was acceptable to Fry and Banta, but not Sandra Anderson, at which point all four made a pact to remain together. The FBI would not comment on possible arrests, but confirmed they are talking to the group.

By January 29, the four had ended negotiations with the FBI and were planning to remain at the refuge until their supplies run out.

Meanwhile, also on January 29, Ammon Bundy, Ryan Bundy, Ryan Payne, Jason Patrick, and another jailed militant named Dylan Anderson were all refused bail in a hearing, with Magistrate Judge Stacie Beckerman saying she would not release them while the occupation continues. Bundy's lawyer said that he is not aligned with those remaining in occupation and that he did not recognize Fry's name. The defendants will return to court in the week beginning February 1. Bundy and his wife separately continued to call for the occupation to end.

On January 29, the Pacific Patriots Network appealed for those supporting the occupation to come to Burns. They also organized a rally that went through Burns on the night on January 30.

Also on January 29, Shawna Cox was bailed.

A detention hearing was held on January 30 for seven of the militants arrested on January 26.

Also on January 30, the FBI stated that they were continuing negotiations with the four remaining militants.

== Fifth week ==
=== January 31–February 2 ===
By January 31, FBI agents have scrutinized social media postings, interviews, and online talk shows that have been made during the occupation since its beginning. The four remaining militants claimed that federal authorities have shut down their ability to communicate with the outside world, including by locking down their ability to make or receive mobile phone calls, an action later confirmed by the FBI. Ammon Bundy repeated his calls for them to surrender. However, the militants were still able to maintain contact with Oregon Public Broadcasting using David Fry's personal cell phone.

The 3 Percenters of Idaho planned a protest rally at the Harney County Courthouse on February 1 in support of the remaining militants. The rally saw around 200 demonstrators in Burns, some from out of town, in support of the occupation, but also a counter-demonstration of about 300 against the occupation.

In Bunkerville, Nevada, Cliven Bundy reacted to his son Ammon's call for the remaining militants to stand down and return home by sending a letter to Sheriff David Ward, dated February 1. Governor Kate Brown and President Barack Obama each received a carbon copy, and another copy was posted on his Facebook page. The letter informed Ward that the militants will retain possession of the refuge. Bundy writes, "This is notice that We the People of Harney County and also We the People of the citizens of the United States DO GIVE NOTICE THAT WE WILL RETAIN POSSESSION OF THE HARNEY COUNTY RESOURCE CENTER." Bundy also demanded that federal and state police leave Harney County and that a Harney County sheriff guard post be placed at the entrance road leading to the refuge to stop anyone from entering or exiting for the time being. On February 2, through his lawyers, Ammon repeated his call for the four remaining militants at the refuge to return home, saying, "Because of the restrictions of solitary confinement for 23 hours per day, I have not been able to speak to my father. I am requesting that the four remaining protesters go home now so their lives are not taken...."

=== February 3–6 ===
On February 3, the militants' line of communication with OPB was cut. At 2:15 p.m. that same day, the network received a call from a blocked number, informing them about the situation and saying that the four militants were safe. The caller turned down multiple requests of identification, explaining that doing so would "compromise ongoing negotiations between the FBI and the remaining militants."

On February 6, police added a lighted sign on the roadblock, warning that anyone passing it would be subjected to an arrest.

Also on February 6, more than 1,000 supporters attended the funeral of Robert "LaVoy" Finicum in Kanab, Utah, while others rebuilt a razed memorial on U.S. Route 395. About another 100 people led by the 3 Percenters of Idaho rallied at the Idaho Statehouse in the afternoon in honor of Finicum, who they believed was unarmed at the time of his death.

== Sixth week ==
=== February 7–9 ===
After a week without communication, David Fry was able to reestablish online communications, posting several videos on YouTube and claiming that he managed to find a way around the FBI's lockdown of their communication to the outside world. In one video, he showed a large collection of empty water and soda bottles, which he claimed to be "booby traps" to protect the remaining militants from the FBI if they breached the refuge.

=== February 10–11 ===
At about 4:30 p.m. on February 10, one of the remaining militants rode past the police barricades on an all-terrain vehicle before returning to the refuge at a high speed. As a result, federal authorities began to surround the refuge at around 5:45 p.m. Mike Arnold, Ammon Bundy's lawyer, learned of the escalation from a live feed where the remaining holdouts were talking of murder and asking to speak to Nevada Assemblywoman Michele Fiore. Fiore was informed of the request as she touched down at the Portland International Airport. Meanwhile, Arnold sent text messages to an FBI negotiator saying, "Fiore is landing now. Can you get her on the phone with the people at the refuge? ... We can slow this down by offering Michele Fiore to talk to them." Fiore stated on a YouTube livestream with the militants that she would try to mediate the situation. While she talked to the four militants, Arnold worked on getting the FBI on the phone. At 7:38 p.m., an FBI agent told Arnold that Fiore was doing a good job and they should go to Burns.

Later that night, it was reported that the remaining members would be turning themselves in to the FBI at 8:00 a.m. the following morning. On February 11, Sean Anderson, Sandra Anderson, Jeff Banta, and David Fry surrendered without incident to the FBI. Fry was the last militant to remain at the refuge before his arrest.

The previous night, Cliven Bundy was arrested for events during the 2014 Bundy standoff, after he flew into Portland to support Fry, Banta, and the Andersons.

== Post-occupation ==
The Oregon State Police received death threats following Robert "LaVoy" Finicum's shooting by one of its officers.

=== Further arrests ===
The final arrest of the 26 militants indicted for felony conspiracy, was of Travis Cox, and took place on April 12 in Cedar City, Utah. A 27th militant, Scott Alan Willingham, was also arrested on March 16. Willingham pleaded guilty to one count of theft of government property on May 12. Michael Ray Emry, who had described himself as being an "embedded reporter" for the 3 Percenters of Idaho, was arrested by the FBI on May 6 in John Day, Oregon, on federal weapons charges relating to his possession of a stolen fully automatic .50-caliber M2 Browning heavy machine gun. Willingham told The Oregonian that Emry spent time at the refuge for media purposes and to share his expertise with weapons, and supplied another militant at the refuge with a semi-automatic AK-47 rifle.

=== FBI investigation of scene and damage to refuge ===
Examples of damage caused by the militants
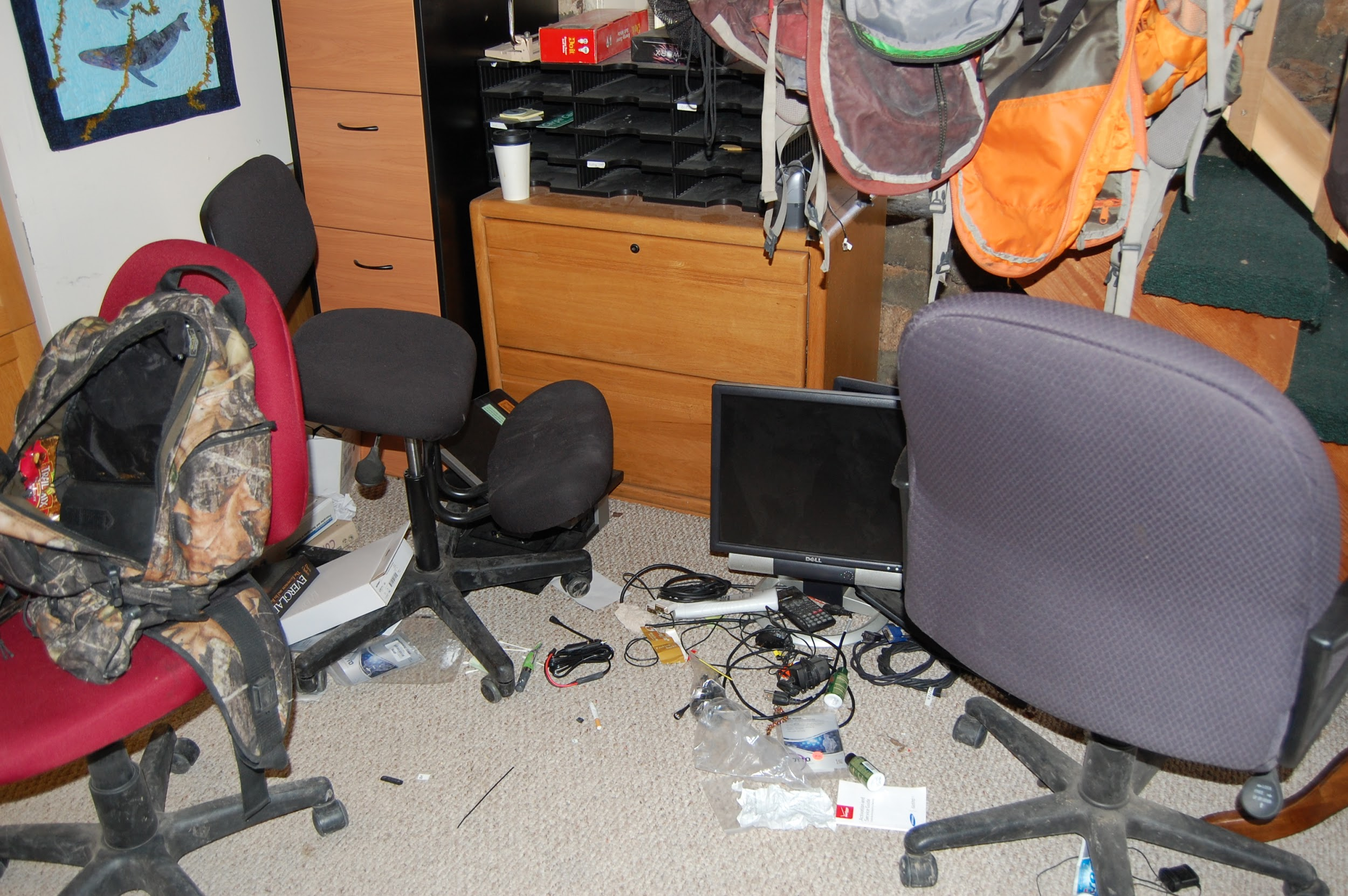
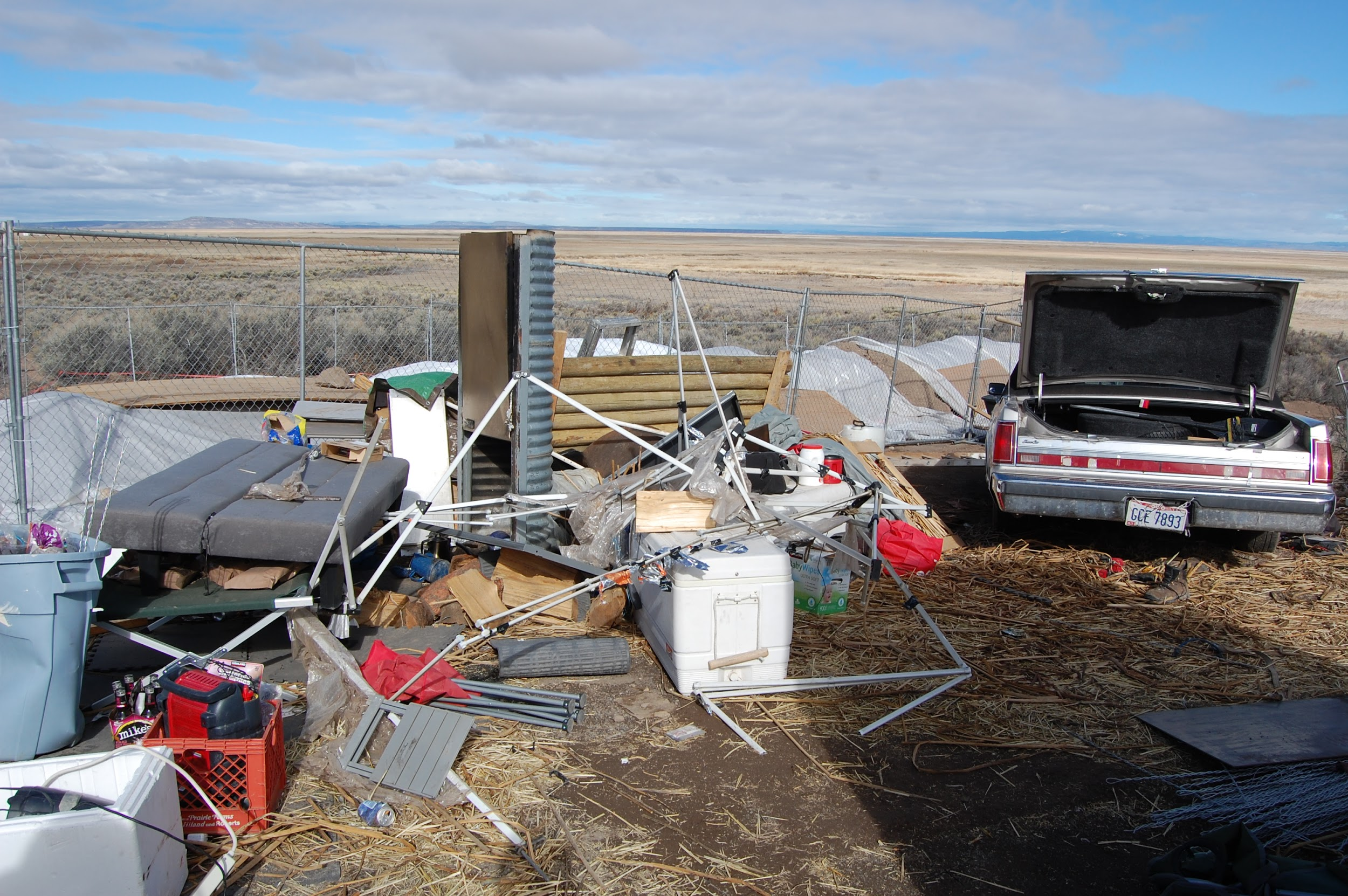
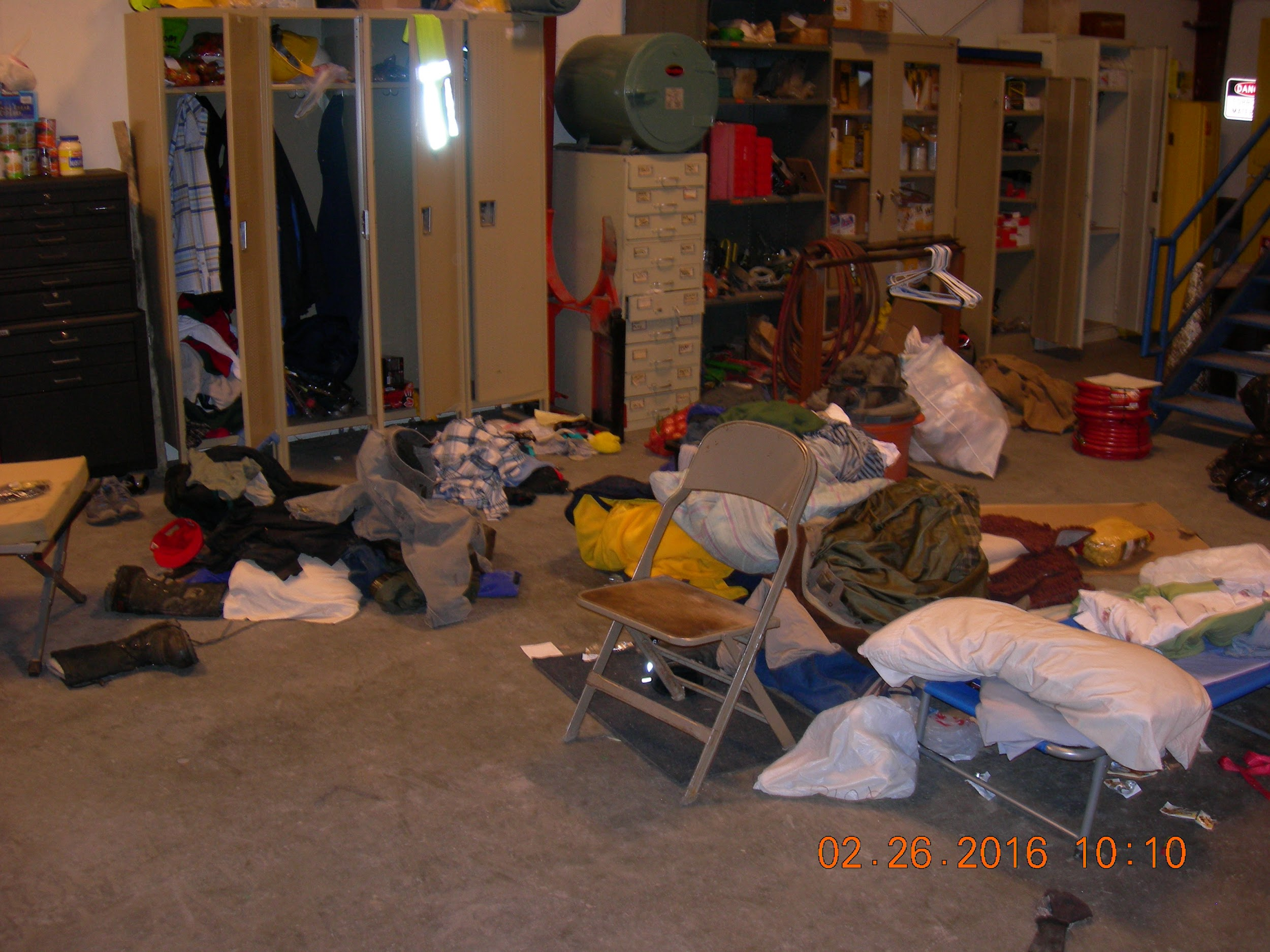

During the occupation the militants illegally dug a new road using a government-owned excavator, expanded a parking lot, dug trenches, destroyed part of a USFWS-owned fence, and removed security cameras; the full extent of the damage is not yet known. In a court filing in February 2016, federal prosecutors said that the FBI had discovered "significant amounts of human feces" at "two large trenches and an improvised road on or adjacent to grounds containing sensitive artifacts" of the Burns Paiute Tribe. A USFWS spokesperson said that the damage risked "the destruction and desecration of culturally significant Native American sites" and called it "disgusting, ghoulish behavior." The Burns Paiute Tribe condemned the damage. Two of the militants, Sean Larry Anderson and Jake Edward Ryan, were subsequently indicted for "depredation of government property," an offense that carries a potential ten-year jail sentence. A group of 600 volunteers signed up to restore the refuge, after the Oregon Natural Desert Association sought assistance. The FBI's Art Crime Team has conducted an archaeological field assessment to determine if the Native American Graves Protection and Repatriation Act or the Archaeological Resources Protection Act of 1979 were violated; additional charges may result if so.

Following the surrender of the last militants, the FBI labeled the entire refuge a crime scene and canvassed the buildings in search of explosives and any previously existing hazardous materials. A collection of firearms and explosives were found inside the refuge. The FBI also found evidence that the militants used a boat launch area, about 1.5 miles (2 km) northeast of the refuge, for firearms training. At the boat launch area, investigators recovered about 1,685 spent shell casings.

The refuge remained closed after the FBI left the site in late February, with the entrance road blocked off from public access by armed officers from the U.S. Fish and Wildlife Service. The refuge's manager described it as "one big mess" at the end of February. Although he and 15 other employees at the refuge were able to return to their jobs at the end of February, they found that while there had not been much structural damage to the buildings, there had been a great deal of disruption to files, heavy equipment and fittings, in addition to the problems caused by a lengthy break in the maintenance of the refuge's infrastructure. There was no contingency funding for the repairs and rehabilitation needed, and it was not thought likely that the refuge would be able to reopen to the public for several months.

=== Costs ===
According to an analysis by The Oregonian, the occupation "cost taxpayers at least $3.3 million to cover the massive police response, a week of shuttered schools and a long list of supplies ranging from food to flashlight batteries," and that number is almost certainly an underestimate.

Most of the costs was for around-the-clock police work: the Oregon State Police spent US$1.2 million on wages, overtime, lodging, and fuel; while an additional US$788,500 was paid for help from other police and government agencies from outside Harney County. Harney County, its schools, and the municipalities of Burns and Hines spent US$521,800. The US$3.3 million figure also includes wages paid to employees who could not work because of the occupation, such as US$425,000 for about 120 BLM employees whose offices were closed. The figure of the costs does not include additional costs, such as lost time in the field, delayed or canceled BLM projects, or added demand for food and services at local nonprofits, such as the Harney County Senior Center.

=== Investigation of FBI shots fired during Finicum's death ===
Investigators with the Deschutes County Sheriff's Office, assigned to process the scene of Robert "LaVoy" Finicum's shooting, were accounting for the two known sets of shots fired by the OSP officers during the event (the shots that killed Finicum, and the earlier shots that struck his vehicle) when they discovered a bullet that struck the roof of the truck at a different trajectory. After ascertaining the bullet's existence with cell phone video taken by Shawna Cox, investigators modeled the bullet's trajectory using computers, and determined that the bullet was fired from the direction where two FBI agents were standing. They later determined that an operator with an FBI Hostage Rescue Team fired twice at Finicum, missing and injuring militant Ryan Bundy in the process. The agent, whose identity was withheld, was under investigation, along with four other FBI agents who were suspected of attempting to conceal evidence of the gunshots. They reportedly told investigators that none of them fired a shot during the incident.

During initial processing of the scene, rifle casings ejected from the weapon fired by the FBI agent were reported not present. However, an OSP officer later described seeing two rifle casings at the scene near where the FBI agents were positioned. FBI aerial surveillance video shows agents searching the area, then huddling together before breaking up moments later, with one agent bending over twice to pick up an unknown object. Law enforcement officials began the investigation into the gunshots after watching the full surveillance video and suspecting something was amiss. Two FBI pickup trucks were searched for rifle casings, but none were found, while at least three OSP officers were interrogated about their initial processing of the scene.

On March 8, officials revealed their findings to the public. The U.S. Department of Justice launched an investigation into the conduct of the agents.
