= Iron Bar Holdings, LLC v. Cape =

2025 property law case in United States

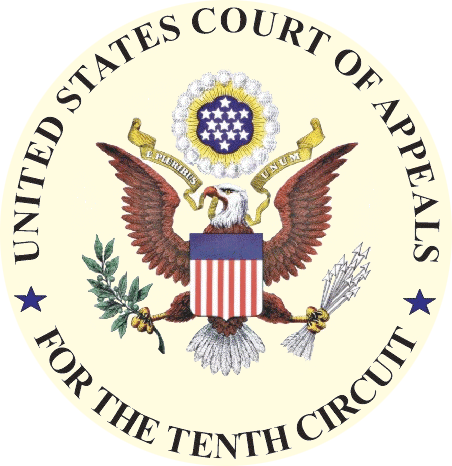
- Court: United States Court of Appeals for the Tenth Circuit
- Full case name: Iron Bar Holdings, LLC v. Cape et al.
- Decided: October 20, 2025
- Citation: 131 F.4th 1153

Court membership
- Judges sitting: David Ebel, Nancy Moritz, Timothy Tymkovich

Case opinions
- Majority: Tymkovich, joined by Ebel, Moritz

Laws applied
- USC 43 § 1061, 1063

Iron Bar Holdings, LLC v. Cape was an October 2025 legal case involving property law and public access to federal lands in Wyoming. At issue was whether corner crossing on foot without physically contacting private land and without causing damage to private property constituted an unlawful trespass. The case's outcome has potentially opened up over 3,000,000 acres (12,000 km^{2}) of public land for public access in the United States.

== Historical background ==
A checkerboard-like pattern of government land and private land was created in the American West during the construction of the Transcontinental Railroad in the 1800s. Recognizing the potential for these government parcels to be "unlawfully appropriated" and "to prevent the absorption and ownership of vast tracts of our public domain", and as a reaction to range wars, the United States Congress passed the Unlawful Inclosures Act (UIA) of 1885 (43 U.S.C. § 1061-1066), making it unlawful to exclude the public from public lands by means of inclosure.

== Case background ==
In 2020, three hunters, Bradley Cape, Zachary Smith, and Phillip Yeomans, traveled to Wyoming to hunt on checkerboarded BLM land on Elk Mountain, southwest of the town of Elk Mountain. During their hunt, they crossed between BLM parcels by corner crossing, passing through the airspace over private land held by Iron Bar Holdings, LLC (IBH), owned by Fred Eshelman, founder of PPD, Inc.

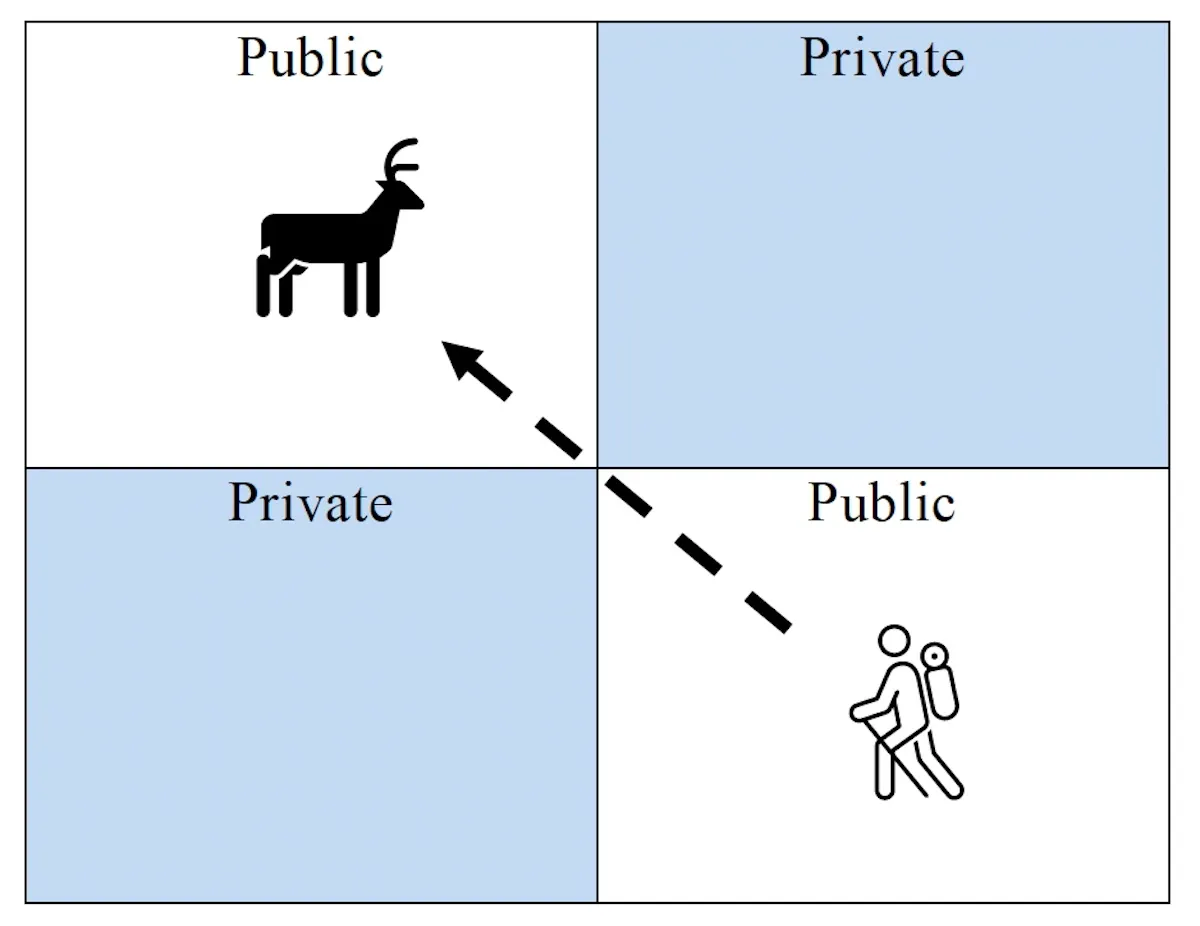
Corner crossing conceptualization

At one of these corners, IBH had run a locked chain between two private property signposts fixed on parcels owned by IBH, requiring the hunters to grab the signposts and swing around them to get to BLM land.

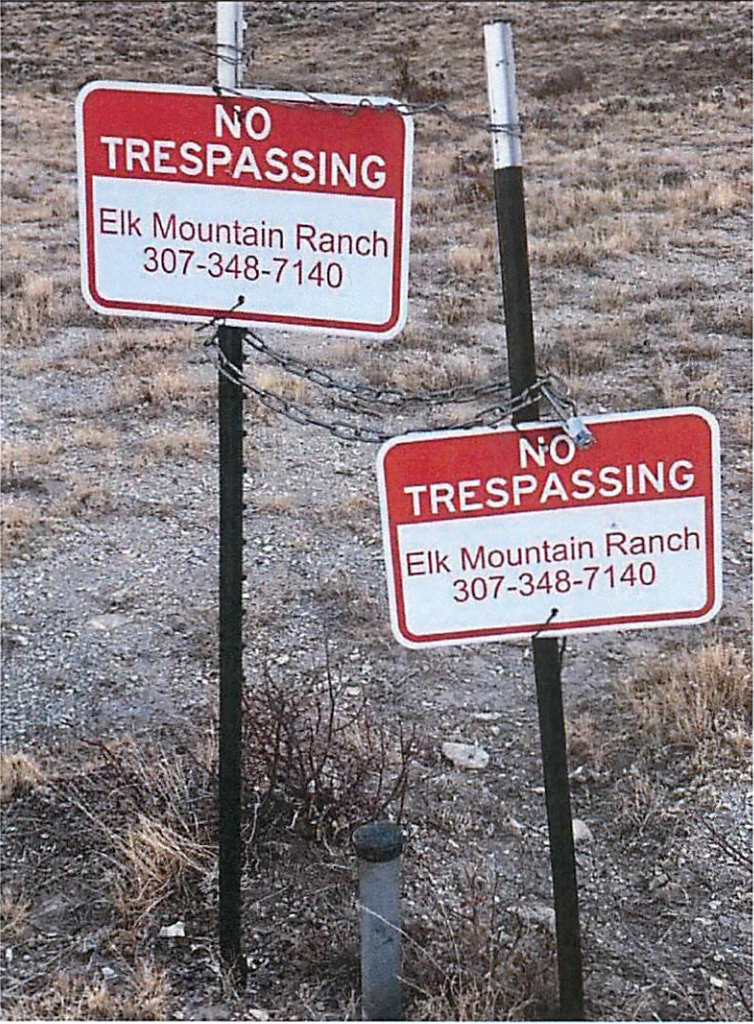
No Trespassing signs on the corners of IBH's land

IBH's property manager, Steven Grende, discovered the hunters on public land that he believed was only accessible by trespassing, and demanded that the hunters leave the area. In a later deposition, Eshelman stated IBH had a company policy for employees to confront individuals found either on public land near IBH property or on IBH property. The hunters refused to leave the area, so the property manager contacted local law enforcement. The responding sheriff took no action after the hunters explained how they had accessed the public land, and the hunters returned home without further legal escalation. No evidence was presented in later cases brought against the hunters that the hunters had touched the surface of IBH's property while corner crossing or had caused any private property damage.

In 2021, the three hunters returned, along with a fourth hunter, John Slowensky, and used a step ladder to travel between BLM parcels, thereby avoiding contact with IBH’s signposts.

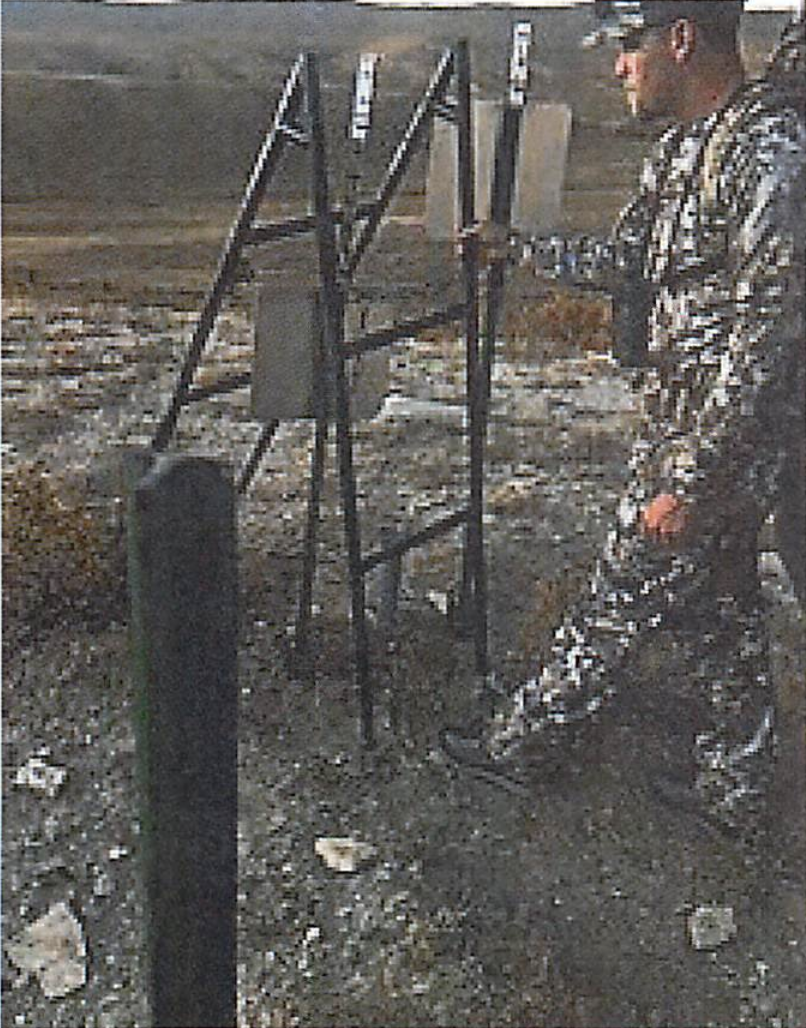
One of the hunters using a step-ladder to access public land

Grende confronted the hunters again, but when the hunters refused to leave the public land, Grende contacted the Wyoming Game and Fish Department (WGFD), which did not take action against the hunters. Grende then contacted the Carbon County sheriff's department, which initially declined to take action against the hunters. Grende finally contacted the Carbon County District Attorney office, and the DA advised the county sheriff to issue the hunters criminal trespass citations and told the WGFD to order the hunters to leave the area and not return. The hunters were later acquitted of the criminal trespassing charges by a jury.

== Wyoming District Court decision ==
IBH also served the hunters in Wyoming District Court, seeking a summary judgment against the hunters. During disclosure, IBH alleged the hunters had caused between $7–9 million in damages from property diminution. The large value sought for damages was interpreted as an intimidation tactic by Backcountry Hunters & Anglers, which had filed an amicus curiae brief in support of the hunters:

[This disclosure] says things that have been unsaid for a long time. What they are saying is that they have the sole right to that public land and that if we the people have access to it, that diminishes the value of their ranch. That has not been said publicly, really ever.

— Land Tawney, former president and CEO of Backcountry Hunters & Anglers

The court found in favor of the hunters, granting a summary judgement in regards to the corner crossing in 2020 and 2021:

[...]where a person corner crosses on foot within the checkerboard from public land to public land without touching the surface of private land and without damaging property, there is no liability for trespass.

— Wyoming District Court Chief Judge Skavdahl

Summary judgment was denied concerning an OnX GPS waypoint placed by one of the hunters on IBH property not near a corner, as there was a "genuine dispute of material facts" regarding whether the hunters had trespassed at this location.

IBH's motion for partial summary judgment was denied, despite Wyoming state law indicating the hunters had likely trespassed under statute § 10-4-302, which states: The ownership of the space above the lands and waters of this state is declared to be vested in the several owners. Judge Skavdahl denied IBH's judgment, citing 43 U.S.C. § 1063: the lock and chain IBH had strung between its land corners constituted an unlawful inclosure as it obstructed the hunters from peaceably entering public land.

== 10th Circuit Court appeal ==
IBH appealed the District Court’s ruling to the 10th Circuit Court; IBH disputed the District Court’s determination that IBH had violated the UIA, arguing that it had not inclosed public property because it had not constructed a fence. The Circuit Court unanimously upheld the lower court's decision, using a textualist approach to interpret the UIA, asserting that fencing and inclosing are not coextensive as terms, and that IBH did not need to construct a fence to have unlawfully inclosed public land:

[...]a purely legal barrier erected by “no trespassing” signs–like a virtual wall–could be considered an inclosure under the UIA.

— Judge Tymkovich

States under the 10th Circuit's jurisdiction

== Supreme Court appeal ==
IBH attempted to appeal the 10th Circuit Court's affirmation to the Supreme Court of the United States, and on July 17, 2025, submitted its petition for a writ of certiorari to the court, with the United Property Owners of Montana, Inc., Wyoming Stock Growers Association, Wyoming Woolgrowers Association, Montana Stockgrowers Association, and the Claremont Institute Center for Constitutional Jurisprudence filing amicus curiae briefs in support. On October 20, Iron Bar Holdings' petition was denied by Justice Gorsuch, upholding the 10th Circuit Court's prior determination.

== Public access ramifications ==
According to OnX, over 8,300,000 acres (34,000 km^{2}) of public land would become accessible in the western United States if corner crossing were legalized nationwide; the 10th Circuit's ruling has potentially opened to the public 2,440,000 acres (9,900 km^{2}) of public land in Wyoming, 515,000 acres (2,080 km^{2}) acres in New Mexico, 249,000 acres (1,010 km^{2}) acres in Utah, and 101,000 acres (410 km^{2}) acres in Colorado.
