= Sepulvado =

Sepulvado is a surname of Spanish origin, derived from a Spanish locality named Sepulveda. Notable people with the surname include:

- Christopher Sepulvado (1943–2025), American convicted murderer
- John Sepulvado (born 1979), American former public radio journalist
