= Melissa Cooper =

Melissa Cooper may refer to:

- Melissa Cooper, a member of Citizens for Constitutional Freedom
- Melissa "Missy" Cooper, a character in The Big Bang Theory and Young Sheldon
