= Elk Mountain (Carbon County, Wyoming) =

Mountain in Carbon County, Wyoming, United States

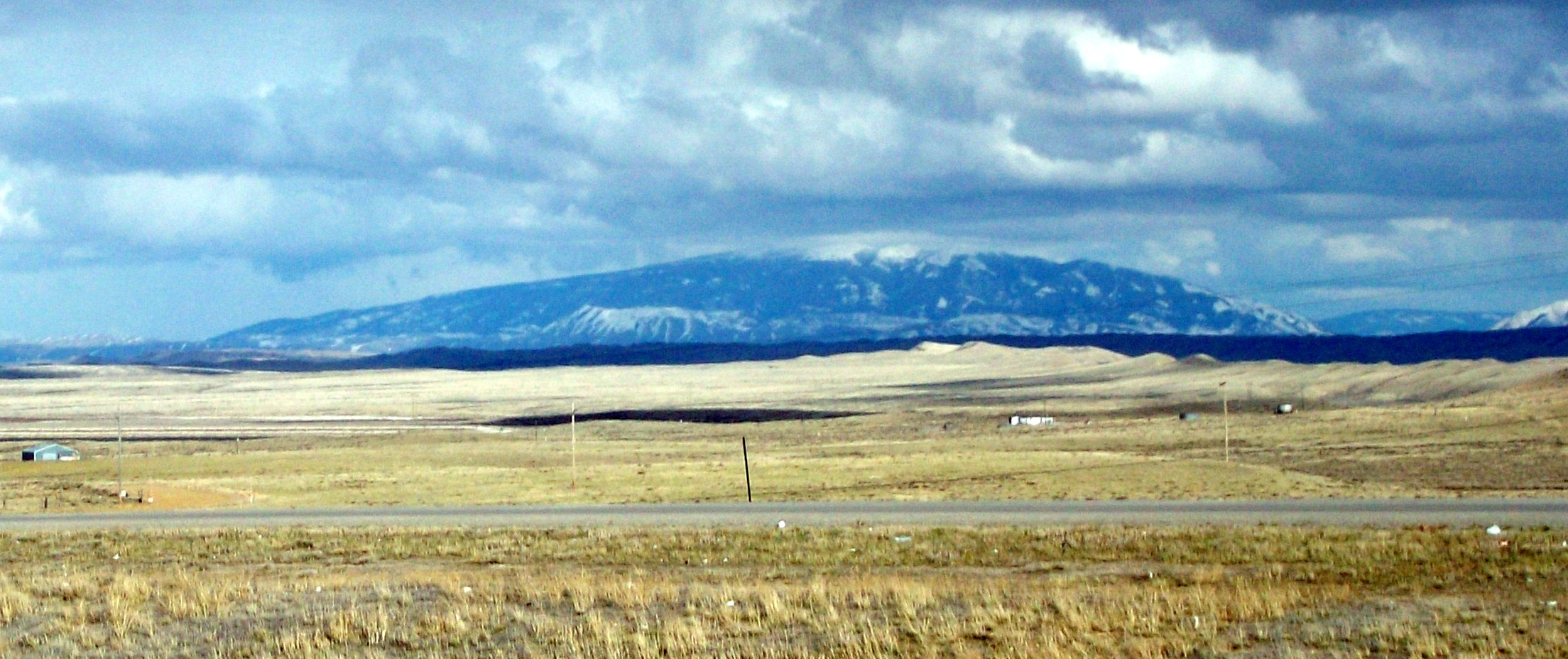
- Elk Mountain, as seen from Rawlins, April 2011

Highest point
- Elevation: 11,162 ft (3,402 m) NAVD 88
- Prominence: 3,296 ft (1,005 m)
- Coordinates: 41°38′00″N 106°31′34″W

Geography
- Location within Wyoming
- Location: Carbon County, Wyoming, U.S.
- Parent range: Medicine Bow Mountains

Climbing
- Easiest route: Private road, hike.

Elk Mountain is a peak at the northern end of the Medicine Bow Mountains in Carbon County, Wyoming, United States.

== Description ==
The mountain is located 7 miles (11 km) southwest of the town of Elk Mountain and roughly 38 miles (61 km) from Rawlins. The mountain is the area's most visible feature. It is located south of Interstate 80 in Carbon County. Elk Mountain is the 8th most prominent summit in the state of Wyoming.

Radio station KBDY broadcasts from a tower on the summit. This allows the station to be received over a significant area with only 630 watts of effective radiated power. Wyoming Public Radio also has a transmitter on the mountain, KAIW 88.9, which carries their classical format. It broadcasts with 580 watts effective radiated power. The peak is also used for other radio transmissions.

== Access issues ==
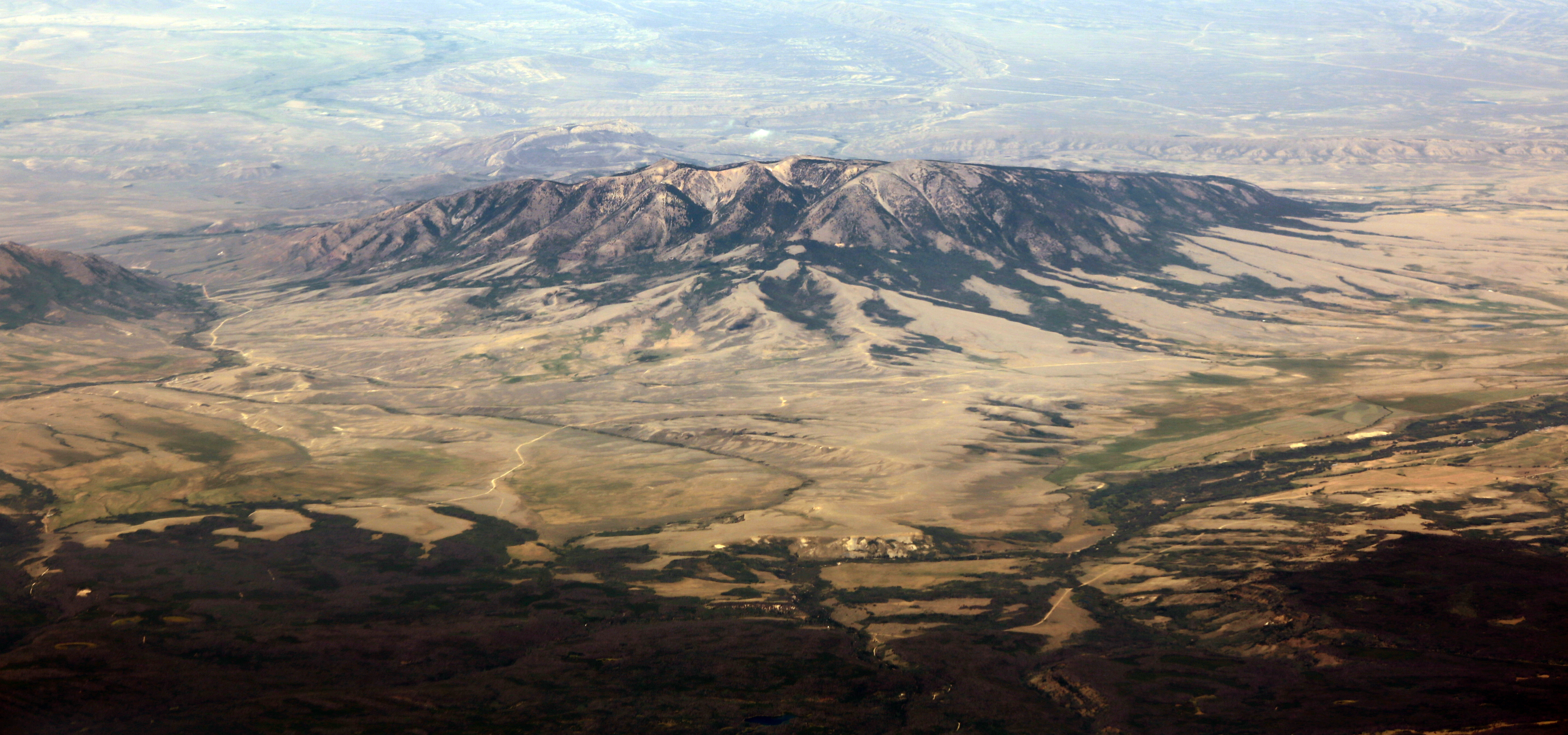
Northeast at Elk Mountain, August 2012

Elk Mountain is located in a public landlocked parcel which became the center of federal lawsuit against four hunters from Missouri in 2022. In 2020 and 2021, the hunters used a step ladder and onX, an application that maps public lands, to "corner cross" their way over the 22,000-acre ranch (8,900 ha) owned by Fred Eshelman, an entrepreneur and resident of North Carolina. Corner crossing is a method of traveling through alternating public and private land without stepping foot on the privately owned parcels by crossing over the corners, which are shared ownership between the government and private owners. Eshelman pressed criminal trespassing charges against the hunters for "crossing into his airspace." They were found not guilty following a jury trial. The ensuing civil case set precedent that corner crossing is legal. There are 2.44 million acres of landlocked public land in Wyoming, and 8.3 million acres across the entire Western United States. The hunters raised $118,000 to cover their legal defense from 1,200 individual donors. The landowner signaled intent to take the case to the Supreme Court, and later filed a petition which was declined.

== See also ==
- List of mountain peaks of Wyoming
