= OnX Maps =

Outdoor recreation mapping company

- Founded: 2009
- Headquarters: Missoula, Montana
- Number of employees: 400
- Website: onxmaps.com

onX is a private American technology company that develops digital mapping applications for outdoor recreation. It was founded in Missoula, Montana in 2009 as a hardware company, developing chips that extended Garmin GPS devices with land ownership data for the purpose of hunting. In 2013 it pivoted to the development of mobile applications, and in 2024 announced a $87 million dollar Series B venture round from Summit Partners.

== Products ==
onX develops four products: onX Hunt, onX Offroad, onX Backcountry, and onX Fish.

=== onX Hunt ===
onX Hunt was onX's first application. While it has received praise for expanding access to outdoor recreation and raising awareness of landlocked public lands, it has also received numerous criticisms regarding user privacy and the erasure of 'secret spots.'

In 2023, the owners of Elk Mountain Ranch filed a lawsuit against four Wyoming corner crossers, alleging that their activities devalued the ranch by $7.75 million dollars. As part of the lawsuit, the owners subpoenaed onX and discovered a point named 'Waypoint 6' on the property, and attempted to use the point as evidence of trespassing. A spokesperson for onX stated that “One could drop a waypoint for any reason at all and one has not necessarily been to the places where he or she has dropped a waypoint.”

When asked if it would consider selling the data users provide to the service, onX explained that it believes the users creating the points retain ownership of them.

=== onX Backcountry ===
onX Backcountry is a mapping application for backcountry ski touring, hiking, climbing, and mountain biking.

In 2021, onX acquired the rock climbing database Mountain Project for its expansion into climbing. onX promised to continue operating the site without a paywall, however later shut down its API and filed a DMCA takedown against competitor Open Beta, despite claiming in its terms that users own the data.

=== onX Fish ===
To develop onX Fish, onX purchased TroutRoutes.

== Access Initiatives ==
onX has funded a number of environmental stewardship projects.

- $5,000 microgrants for trail maintenance in collaboration with Toyota
- "secure[ing] or improve[ing] public access to 154,000 acres, and support[ing] the maintenance and building of 255 miles of trails"
- A program to enroll 10,000 acres of South Dakota land for walk-in access for $25 per acre.
