= Mountain Project =

Online database of climbing routes

- Screenshot Mountain Project Homepage – April 2018
- Founded: 2005; 21 years ago
- Headquarters: Boulder, Colorado, United States
- Founders: Nick Wilder and Andy Laakmann
- President: Mike Ahnemann
- CEO: Nick Wilder
- Employees: 7 (in 2015)
- Parent: Adventure Projects Inc. and onX
- Website: www.mountainproject.com
- Users: 3M (unique visitors in 2014)

Mountain Project is a website that serves as a guidebook to more than 350,000 climbing routes across the world. The website is operated by Adventure Projects Inc., a Boulder, Colorado-based company, founded by Nick Wilder and Andy Laakmann in 2005, and purchased on June 11, 2015 by REI. Adventure Projects, Inc. subsequently became independent and has since been acquired by onX.

Adventure Projects Inc. has expanded from its initial focus by creating MTBProject.com, a website for mountain bike trail maps, HikingProject.com for hiking trails, PowderProject.com for backcountry skiing trails, and TrailRunProject.com for cross-country running trails.
