= Corner crossing =

Diagonally crossing from one public land to another

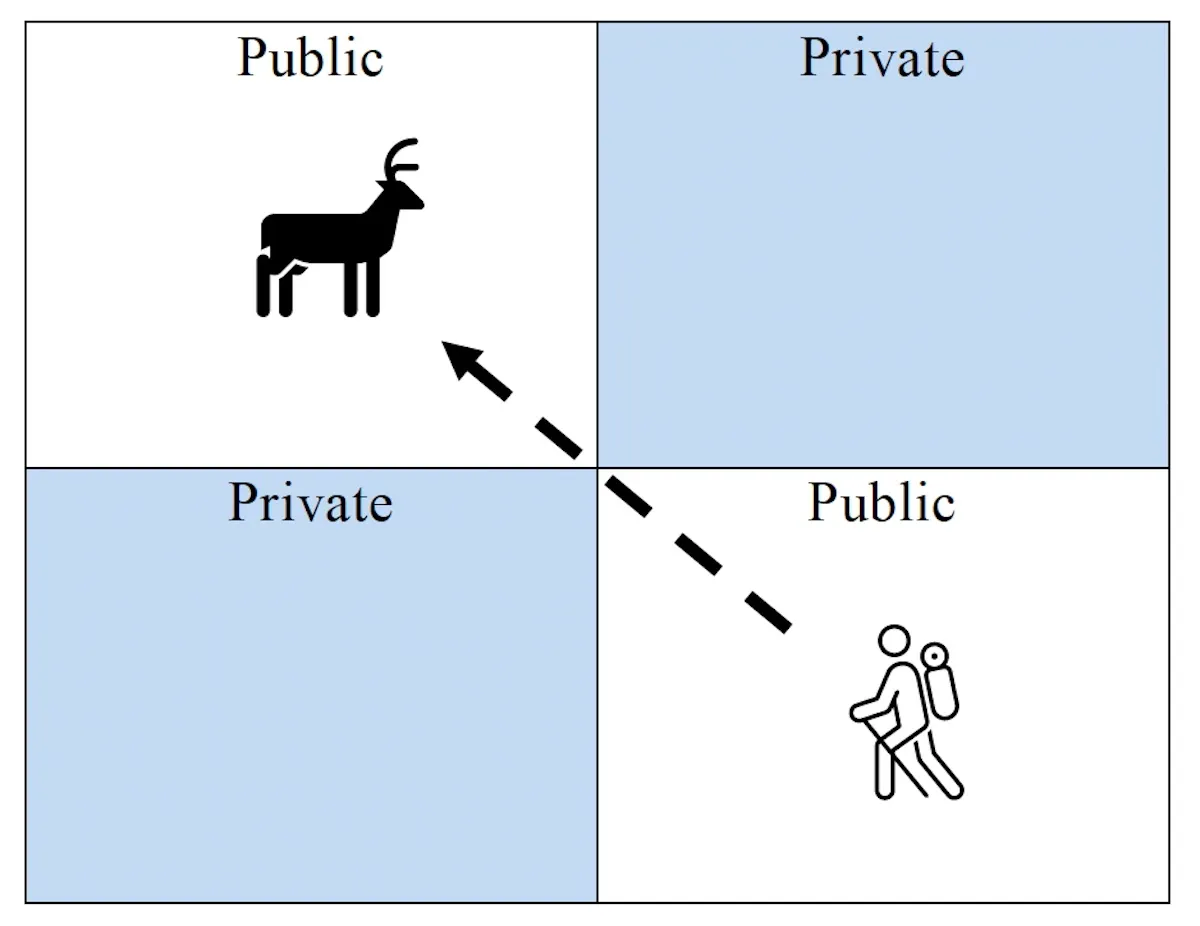
A graphic depicting corner crossing

A map of the legality of corner crossing by US state.

Corner crossing is the act of stepping from one parcel of public land to another at the intersection (or "corner") of two public parcels that are diagonally adjacent, without setting foot on the private land that borders them. This situation frequently arises in checkerboarded land. While no private land is physically touched, the legality is disputed in the U.S. because it may involve crossing private airspace.

If corner crossing is illegal, some public lands are necessarily landlocked and hence inaccessible. There are 8.3 million acres of public land across 11 states that would be inaccessible without corner crossing.

== Legality ==
In 2017, a Montana house bill to criminalize corner crossing failed.

In 2021, hunters in Wyoming were charged with trespassing on private land they never actually set foot on when they crossed between two parcels of public land at the corner where they touched. The landowners alleged that their airspace was violated. A jury found the hunters not guilty, but a civil lawsuit was also filed by the landowners, Iron Bar Holdings, LLC v. Cape et al. This civil lawsuit was escalated U.S. Court of Appeals for the Tenth Circuit, and in 2025, the court sided unanimously against the land owners. As a result, precedent was set deeming corner crossing to be legal in the circuit's 6 states: Wyoming, Colorado, New Mexico, Utah, Oklahoma and Kansas. The ruling has nuance: the court interpreted federal law "to allow corner-crossing if access to public lands is otherwise restricted", meaning that corner crossing when there is another path to the public land still exists in a legal grey area.

Following the ruling, legislation titled "Corner crossing clarification" was proposed in Wyoming, which seeks to define corner crossing as not trespassing. It has been criticised for not being presented as an affirmative right, with hunters pointing to failed legislation in 2011 as a better model.

The landowner signaled intent to take the case to the Supreme Court, and in July 16th 2025 filed a petition which was obtained by WyoFile. The petition received support from conservative lawyer John Eastman and the Montana Stockgrowers Association. The court declined to hear the case.
