= Citizens for Constitutional Freedom =

Armed private U.S. militia

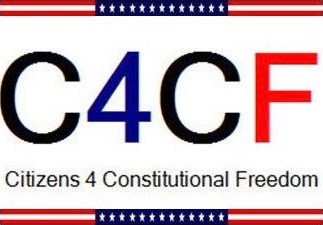
- Citizens for Constitutional Freedom logo
- Owner: Ammon Bundy
- Website: People for Constitutional Freedom: c4cf.com; citizens4constitutionalfreedom.com; p4cf.com
- Current status: Offline

Citizens for Constitutional Freedom (C4CF), later also known as People for Constitutional Freedom (P4CF), was the name taken on January 4, 2016, by an armed private U.S. militia that occupied the U.S. Fish and Wildlife Service's Malheur National Wildlife Refuge headquarters in the U.S. state of Oregon from January 2 to February 11, 2016. The leader of the organization was Ammon Bundy, son of Cliven D. Bundy, who engaged in a standoff with the federal government over grazing rights on federal land.

Eight of its members, including Ammon Bundy, were arrested on January 26, 2016 while a ninth member, Robert "LaVoy" Finicum, was shot and killed by law enforcement officers. This was followed by a number of other arrests that eventually culminated in the end of the occupation. A total of 27 people were charged under federal law with a variety of offenses, including a single count of felony conspiracy. Their trials were scheduled to start on September 7, 2016, and February 14, 2017.

During the occupation, the militia group claimed that the United States Constitution allows the federal government of the United States to own only a small amount of land, and that the government can acquire land in states only with the state's consent. Such claims have been repeatedly rejected by federal courts, including the United States Supreme Court; the property clause of the United States Constitution grants plenary authority to Congress to manage federal property, including land.

== Known members ==
A total of at least 34 people from 13 states are known to have served roles in the group during the occupation. Some have had a history of criminal activity and prior involvement in right-wing activism. They are:

=== Indicted ===
- Dylan Wade Anderson, 34, of Provo, Utah, identified himself as "Captain Moroni" in reference to a figure in the Book of Mormon who rescues his people by raising a flag called a "title of liberty" against an evil force. He was arrested by the Federal Bureau of Investigation (FBI) on January 27 at a checkpoint outside the refuge.
- Sandra Lynn Anderson, 48, of Riggins, Idaho, surrendered to the FBI on February 11 and was arrested. She was a former barber and cosmetologist who recently moved from Wisconsin to Idaho.
- Sean Larry Anderson, 47, of Riggins, Idaho (husband of Sandra Anderson), surrendered to the FBI on February 11 and was arrested. Prior to the occupation, he owned an outdoor supplies store in Riggins. Anderson had an outstanding bench warrant related to an August 2014 arrest and had been charged with resisting an officer, possession of THC, and drug paraphernalia, all misdemeanors. He was previously convicted of misdemeanor disorderly conduct in 1998, 2008, and 2009, and of criminal trespassing in 2002, all in Wisconsin. He was one of the last four remaining holdouts and unsuccessfully tried to bargain to get the warrant dropped prior to his arrest. He and Jake Ryan were responsible for digging a large trench on an archaeological site at the refuge, which was considered sacred to the Burns Paiute Tribe.
- Jeff Wayne Banta, 46, of Yerington, Nevada, surrendered to the FBI on February 11 and was arrested. He was a carpenter who reportedly went to the refuge to assist in the occupation after seeing an online video about the Bureau of Land Management (BLM).
- Jason Charles Blomgren, also known as "Joker J," 41, of Murphy, North Carolina, was arrested on February 11 in Bunkerville, Nevada, after being named in an indictment.
- Ammon Edward Bundy, 40, of Emmett, Idaho, is a car fleet manager and was the leader of the occupation until his arrest on January 26 during a traffic stop on U.S. Route 395 in Harney County, Oregon. On April 10, 2014, he was videotaped being tasered by federal agents when protesters surrounded a civilian driving a BLM-owned truck. According to Bundy, he began leading the occupation after receiving a divine message ordering him to do so.
- Ryan C. Bundy, 43, of Mesquite, Nevada, is the brother of Ammon Bundy. As he was being arrested in January 2015 in Cedar City, Utah, on a warrant for interfering with an animal control officer, Bundy allegedly resisted arrest and was given additional charges. In 2014, Ryan organized and conducted an illegal ATV ride to protest ATV restrictions on federal property which were meant to protect the archaeological sites there. In March 2015, Ryan harassed and threatened BLM employees during a city hall presentation regarding a BLM Land Management Plan related to Gold Butte, Nevada. Ryan was lightly wounded while being arrested on January 26 during a traffic stop on U.S. Route 395 in Harney County, Oregon. Ryan is believed to have planned and organized actions taken during the occupation, and recruited other supporters. Awaiting trial on charges stemming from the occupation, Ryan, who is representing himself, filed a motion with the court claiming he was incompetent. According to Oregon Public Broadcasting, Bundy wrote to the court: "I, ryan c, man, am an idiot of the ‘Legal Society’; and; am an idiot (layman, outsider) of the ‘Bar Association’; and; i am incompetent; and; am not required by any law to be competent. [sic]" His motion was denied.
- Brian D. Cavalier, also known as "Booda" or "Booda Bear," 44, of Bunkerville, Nevada, was involved in the 2014 Bundy standoff in Nevada and had described himself as a "personal bodyguard" to Cliven Bundy during that time. After leaving the refuge on January 5, Cavalier was arrested in Maricopa County, Arizona, on an outstanding warrant and later released. According to prosecutors, his access to firearms is restricted due to his criminal record, but he has nonetheless consistently possessed weapons. Cavalier was convicted in Arizona of misdemeanor theft in 2014, and misdemeanor extreme DUI in 2005. Cavalier has claimed to have served in the U.S. Marine Corps, but the Corps has stated it has no record of Cavalier. He was arrested on January 26 during a traffic stop on U.S. Route 395 in Harney County, Oregon.

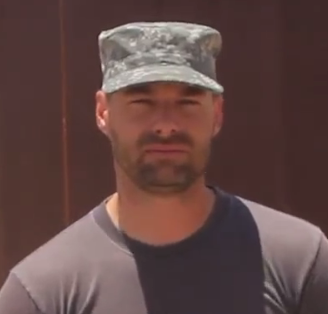
Blaine Cooper, 2014

- Blaine Cooper, also known as Stanley Blaine Hicks, 36, of Dewey-Humboldt, Arizona, was arrested in Utah on February 11 for his role in the occupation, after traveling there in an "armed convoy" to attend a memorial for fellow militant LaVoy Finicum. He enlisted in the U.S. Marine Corps through the Delayed Entry Program, but according to service records, he never reported for Marine recruit training. He had been convicted in Arizona of felony aggravated assault in 2009. In 2013, during a town hall meeting hosted by U.S. Senator John McCain, Cooper called for McCain to be arrested for treason.
- Shawna Cox, 59, of Kanab, Utah, was arrested on January 26 during a traffic stop on U.S. Route 395 in Harney County, Oregon. A friend of the Bundy family, she, along with her husband, owned and operated small, local businesses and rental properties.
- Travis Levi Cox, 21, of Redmond, Oregon, the youngest of the militants, was on the run from federal authorities after being named in an indictment. He was arrested in Utah on April 12 and held in a county jail in Cedar City, Utah.
- Duane Leo Ehmer, 45, of Irrigon, Oregon, was arrested by the FBI at a checkpoint outside the refuge on January 27. He was frequently photographed with his horse at the refuge. He is a convicted felon banned from possessing firearms, but he, too, was carrying a pistol when he was arrested in January, according to the records. Prosecutors said he also recently posted a photo on Facebook with the threatening caption: "The only way to win a war is to kill enough of the enemy that they do not want to fight anymore."
- Eric Lee Flores, 22, of Tulalip Bay, Washington, was arrested in his hometown on February 11 after being named in an indictment. A member of the Tulalip Tribes, he had been living on the reservation with his fiancée and their six-month-old daughter before the occupation, and also had plans of joining the U.S. Army. During the occupation, Flores traveled back and forth between Burns, Oregon, and Tulalip Bay, Washington, and intermittently served as part of the group's "security detail."
- David Lee Fry, 27, of Blanchester, Ohio, was the last militant to be arrested at the refuge, surrendering to the FBI on February 11. Prior to the occupation, he maintained a social media account and made posts mentioning ISIS and Adolf Hitler, and calling for U.S. President Barack Obama to be found guilty of treason and executed. He had a criminal record that included convictions for possession of drugs and related paraphernalia.
- Wesley Kjar, 32, of Manti, Utah, was arrested on February 11 after being named in an indictment. At the time of his arrest, he had been hauling a trailer containing firearms and magazines. During the occupation, Kjar was quoted in news reports as saying he "wouldn't hesitate to stand between a bullet and Ammon Bundy."
- Corey Lequieu, 44, of Fallon, Nevada, left the refuge immediately after Finicum's death on January 26, though he was arrested on February 11 after being named in an indictment. He served six years in the U.S. Army and had been working for a Fallon trash-haul company prior to the occupation. According to prosecutors, Lequieu made violent threats against the BLM and the FBI, and had been openly declaring his intentions to kill police officers in Harney County, Oregon.
- Kenneth Medenbach, 62, of Crescent, Oregon, was apprehended by the Oregon State Police in Burns on January 15, while driving a government vehicle stolen from the refuge facility; a second vehicle stolen from the wildlife refuge was also recovered at the scene. Both vehicles bore altered markings of "Harney County Resource Center" on the doors, the unofficial name the militants have used for the refuge since shortly after the takeover. Medenbach previously had a history of troubles with the law, including a prior conviction for illegal occupation of government land that included setting up a makeshift shelter with booby traps and a stockpile of explosives, and was on bail awaiting trial for a similar charge from 2015. Medenbach reportedly used many legal quirks and filed legal documents in a way consistent with the anti-government sovereign citizen movement. Medenbach had previously told news reporters that "the Lord's telling me to possess the land, and I can legally do it, because the U.S. Constitution says the government does not own the land."
- Joseph Donald O'Shaughnessy, 43, of Cottonwood, Arizona, was arrested by the FBI on January 26 in Burns. He has previously been arrested for disorderly conduct, domestic violence and drug offenses, according to court records. O'Shaughnessy has argued that he was not a member of the group, being a member of an unrelated militia, but was trying to keep the peace at the refuge.
- Jason Patrick, 43, of Bonaire, Georgia, a roofing contractor, was arrested by the FBI on January 27 at a checkpoint outside the refuge. Patrick, one of the last holdouts at the refuge, faced charges in August 2014 of "making terrorist threats" after he "threatened to kill everyone" inside a Georgia municipal court building, according to prosecutors. Patrick posted bond in that case and was released, but agreed not to possess weapons—a condition that he has since violated. He was photographed with guns during the occupation, prosecutors noted. Initially offering guided tours for journalists during the start of the occupation, Patrick seemed to become the group's new leader following Ammon Bundy's arrest on January 26.
- Ryan Waylen Payne, 32, of Anaconda, Montana, is an electrician and a U.S. Army veteran who served in Iraq. He is a founding member of the West Mountain Rangers, a militia group from Montana. During the Bundy standoff in 2014, Payne claimed to have organized a team of militia sharpshooters. During the occupation, Payne commented that they would "be here for as long as it takes." However, he further remarked that his group was not violent, but it was possible that the standoff could turn violent. Payne was arrested and taken into custody on January 26 during a traffic stop on U.S. Route 395 in Harney County, Oregon. He helped coordinate community meetings outside the refuge during the occupation.

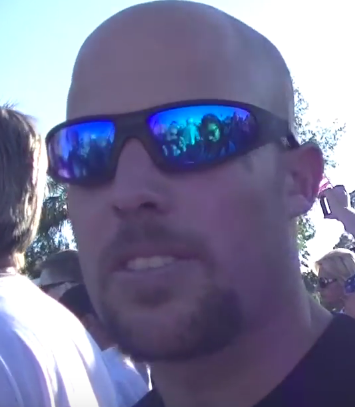
Jon Ritzheimer, pictured here in May 2015, was identified as one of the leaders of the militant occupation.

- Jon Eric Ritzheimer, 32, of Peoria, Arizona, is an anti-government and anti-Islam militant affiliated with the 3 Percenters and formerly associated with the controversial Oath Keepers group. He voluntarily surrendered to the FBI on January 26 in his hometown of Peoria, Arizona.
- Jake Edward Ryan, 27, of Plains, Montana, was named in an indictment on February 11. He was arrested on April 6 after spending two weeks on the run from authorities. Ryan was found hiding in a shed armed with a loaded .45-caliber handgun and several knives. He and Sean Anderson were responsible for digging a large trench on an archaeological site at the refuge, which was considered sacred to the Burns Paiute Tribe.
- Peter Santilli, 50, of Cincinnati, Ohio, is a conservative media host who live-streamed the occupation until his arrest by the FBI on January 26 in Burns. He was the first person to report Finicum's shooting and the arrests on U.S. Route 395. Santilli previously bragged on YouTube about refusing to turn in his guns in violation of a restraining order filed against him. Santilli, who is a vocal supporter of the Bundys, argued that he was a journalist covering the protests. He has also been charged with 16 federal felonies, each attracting sentences of between 5 and 20 years and fines of up to US$250,000 per count, relating to the earlier standoff in Nevada. His arrest prompted an outcry from civil liberties advocates, including the American Civil Liberties Union, who stood by his assertion that he was simply covering the occupation.
- Geoffrey Alan Stanek, 26, of Lafayette, Oregon, was arrested in Forest Grove, Oregon, on February 11 after being named in an indictment the previous day. He served in the U.S. Army for three years before being honorably discharged.
- Darryl William Thorn, 31, of Marysville, Washington, was arrested in Bend, Oregon, on February 11 after being named in an indictment. A worker in Bremerton, Washington, he was a friend of fellow militant Eric Lee Flores, who he met in their shared association with the 3 Percenters.
- Neil Sigurd Wampler, 68, of Los Osos, California, is a camp cook and a retired woodworker. He was convicted in 1977 of second-degree murder for killing his father and as a result is prohibited from possessing firearms, which Wampler has frequently protested. He was arrested on February 11 after being named in an indictment.
- Scott Alan Willingham, 49, an unemployed musician who had been part of a "security detail" during the occupation, was arrested on March 17 by a Grant County, Oregon, sheriff's deputy in Mount Vernon, Oregon, and charged with weapons offenses after threatening to shoot federal law enforcement officers unless he was arrested for his role in the occupation. On March 23, he was transferred into federal custody after being indicted on two federal charges of stealing government property in relation to his stealing of a camera and related equipment worth more than US$1,000 from a utility pole at a transformer station.

=== Others ===
The following militants were reported as avoiding arrest and prosecution related to the occupation:

- Melvin D. Bundy, 41, of Round Mountain, Nevada, is the brother of Ammon and Ryan Bundy. Like his brothers, he opposed the BLM, signing a Change.org petition that opposed restrictions imposed on public lands located in St. George, Utah. He reportedly left the refuge early on in the occupation and is currently not charged for his role. However, he was arrested by federal agents on March 3 following his indictment in connection with the 2014 Bundy standoff in Nevada.
- Melissa Cooper of Dewey-Humboldt, Arizona, is the wife of Blaine Cooper and an employee of a warehouse. She was a cook at the refuge during the occupation.
- Gerald A. DeLemus, 61, of Rochester, New Hampshire, the co-chair of Veterans for Trump in New Hampshire, made headlines in January when he traveled to Malheur to meet with the militants. DeLemus said at the time he was acting on his own and not as a representative of the Donald Trump presidential campaign. He was arrested on March 3 following his indictment in connection with the 2014 Bundy standoff in Nevada. DeLemus is facing nine federal charges based on an indictment brought in Nevada, including conspiracy to commit an offense against the United States, threatening a federal law enforcement officer, assault on a federal officer, obstruction of justice, attempting to impede or injure a federal law enforcement officer, interference with interstate commerce by extortion, and several firearms charges, according to court records.
- Brandon Dowd, 31, of Pine Bluff, Arkansas, one of only two known militants of non-Caucasian heritage, was observed by The Guardian conducting armed security duty at the refuge during the occupation. He encouraged people to visit the refuge and be educated about constitutional rights, and stated that he had been inspired by the 2014 Bundy standoff. Dowd was not among those named in an indictment. He was, however, arrested on February 8 in Harney County, Oregon, for an unrelated May 2015 firearm theft case in Kansas.
- Michael Ray Emry, 54, of Boise, Idaho, was taken into custody by the FBI on May 6 in John Day, Oregon, on federal weapons charges, though he was not charged for his activities at the refuge. He had been found to be in possession of a stolen fully automatic .50-caliber M2 Browning heavy machine gun. The serial number on the weapon was found to have been removed. Before the occupation, Emry had a history of bomb-making and assisted people in airing their anti-government views. According to fellow militant Scott Alan Willingham, Emry spent time at the refuge for media purposes and to share his expertise with weapons, and supplied another militant at the refuge with a semi-automatic AK-47 rifle.
- Robert "LaVoy" Finicum (January 27, 1961 – January 26, 2016), was a Northern Arizona rancher whose cattle grazed on BLM land, maintained that he owned grazing rights on that land through natural law as his friend Cliven Bundy had also maintained. He was shot dead by Oregon State Police officers on January 26 while resisting arrest on U.S. Route 395 in Harney County, Oregon.
- Debra Carter Pope, also known as Debra Bass, 61, of Fallon, Nevada, is the fiancée of Corey Lequieu. She was a former sheriff's deputy and is a U.S. Air Force veteran. Alongside Melissa Cooper, she was a cook at the refuge.

== Motives for the occupation ==
The motivation for the occupation was the control and use of federal lands, which the militants wanted transferred to private ownership or to Harney County, Oregon, control. There is a long history of conflicting interests between different citizens on federal lands, specifically in this case between ranchers and environmentalists. Ranchers have a long history of using federal lands to graze livestock, which was unregulated until the enactment of the Taylor Grazing Act of 1934. Overgrazing can damage or destroy habitats for the livestock themselves and for wildlife. Environmental restrictions like the National Environmental Policy Act of 1969 and the Endangered Species Act of 1973, intended to protect wildlife and the environment, have been increasing over time, placing a burden on ranchers or even putting them out of business. A specific, relevant example was the case of Cliven Bundy, the father of militant Ammon Bundy. In that case, the government determined that Bundy's cattle were damaging the habitat of the desert tortoise, an endangered species. He was subsequently ordered to greatly reduce the number of cattle on federal rangeland on which he had grazing rights, but Bundy refused and also stopped paying grazing fees. The government began removing the trespass cattle, resulting in the 2014 Bundy standoff. Similarities were drawn between the occupation and the Sagebrush Rebellion and wise use movements.

Ammon and Ryan Bundy are members of the Church of Jesus Christ of Latter-day Saints (LDS Church). They and some of the other militants have cited the Mormon scripture as justification for defying government authority. After the occupation began, the LDS Church issued a statement, strongly condemning the seizure and that the armed occupation can in no way be justified on a scriptural basis. Alex Beam describes the Bundys as "Mormon religious fanatics."

Cliven Bundy has frequently made references to the Book of Mormon in his conflicts with the United States government for years. According to Oregon Public Broadcasting (OPB), during the family's 2014 standoff, Bundy used banners quoting Captain Moroni: "In memory of our God, our religion, and freedom, and our peace, our wives, and our children." Ammon Bundy used much of the same language as his father, "mixing Mormon religious symbolism with a disgust of the federal government," according to OPB reporter John Sepulvado. One member of Ammon's militant group refused to give any other name to the press than "Captain Moroni, from Utah" and was quoted as saying, "I didn't come here to shoot I came here to die."

In an op-ed, Chris Zinda of The Independent, published in St. George, Utah, references a relevant work:

Many people do not know that Cliven Bundy, along with his former neighbor Keith Nay, self-published a book titled 'Nay Book' that is a combination of LDS theology and Skousen constitutional theory. Written in the late 1990s, it is the revelatory playbook that Cliven used in 2014 in Bunkerville and that his sons used in Malheur in 2016. It is a vivid example of how his 1950s–80s John Birch Society/Skousen indoctrination formulated his adulthood opinions that have since been passed on to his posterity and beyond.

Before, during, or after the occupation, several militants and a few reported visitors to the refuge espoused connections or used language commonly used by the sovereign citizen movement. Also during the occupation, one visitor, a self-proclaimed judge from Colorado named Bruce Doucette, announced that a "citizens grand jury" would be convened, a common tactic of sovereign citizen groups. Ryan Bundy's court filings have been noted to contain sovereign citizen rhetoric, while Shawna Cox explicitly claimed to be a "sovereign citizen" in a filed countersuit.

== Criminal charges against militants ==
As of March 23, 2016, 27 people involved in the occupation have been charged under federal law; of those, 26 have been indicted for a single federal felony count of conspiracy to impede officers of the U.S. from discharging their official duties through the use of force, intimidation, or threats. A number of those under indictment on the conspiracy charge are also charged with a variety of other counts, some of which incur sentences up to life imprisonment, including possession of firearms and dangerous weapons in federal facilities, use and carry of firearms in relation to a crime of violence, depredation of government property (relating to damaging the site "by means of excavation and the use of heavy equipment"), and theft of government property. In addition, several of those under indictment in Oregon have also been indicted separately for their roles in the 2014 Bundy standoff in Nevada.

The indictees and their initial charges were:

Name	Trial date (Oregon)	Sentence (prison in years / probation or supervised release in years / restitution in US$)	Conspiracy to impede officers of the U.S.	Possession of firearms and dangerous weapons in federal facilities	Use and carry of firearm in relation to a crime of violence	Depredation of government property	Theft of government property	Separate charges related to Bundy standoff
Dylan Wade Anderson	2/14/17	1 year probation	X	X				
Sandra Lynn Anderson	2/14/17	1 year probation	X	X				
Sean Larry Anderson	2/14/17	1 year probation	X	X	X^{(1)}	X		
Jeff Wayne Banta	9/7/16		X^{(9)}	X^{(9)}				
Jason Charles Blomgren	PG	TBD	X	X^{(3)}				
Ammon Edward Bundy	9/7/16		X^{(9)}	X^{(9)}	X^{(1)}			X
Ryan C. Bundy	9/7/16		X^{(9)}	X^{(9)}	X^{(1)}		X^{(10)}	X
Brian D. Cavalier	PG	TS (9 months) / 3 / TBD	X	X	X^{(1)}			X
Blaine Cooper	PG	TBD	X					X
Shawna Cox	9/7/16		X^{(9)}	X^{(8)}				
Travis Levi Cox	PG	2 years probation.	X	X^{(4)}				
Duane Ehmer	2/14/17	366 days	X^{(11)}					
Eric Lee Flores	PG	2 years probation	X	X^{(4)}				
David Lee Fry	9/7/16		X^{(9)}	X^{(9)}	X^{(1)}			
Wesley Kjar	PG	TBD	X	X^{(3)}				
Corey Lequieu	PG	2½ / 3 / TBD	X	X^{(2)}	X^{(2)}			
Kenneth Medenbach	9/7/16		X^{(9)}				X^{(9)}	
Joseph Donald O'Shaughnessy	PG	TBD	X					X
Jason Patrick	2/14/17		X	X	X^{(1)}			
Ryan Waylen Payne	PG	TBD	X	X^{(5)}	X^{(1)}			X
Jon Eric Ritzheimer	PG	TBD	X	X^{(6)}	X^{(1)}		X^{(6)}	
Jake Edward Ryan	2/14/17	366 days plus 60 days	X	X		X		
Peter Santilli	9/7/16		X^{(7)}					X
Geoffrey Alan Stanek	PG	Two years probation	X	X^{(3)}				
Darryl William Thorn	2/14/17	1.5 years n/a $5000	X	X				
Neil Sigurd Wampler	9/7/16		X^{(9)}					
Scott Alan Willingham	PG	TS (190 days) / 2 / TBD					X	

Notes:

- (1). Charge dismissed on June 10.
- (2). Charge will be dismissed at August sentencing.
- (3). Charge will be dismissed at October sentencing.
- (4). Charge will be dismissed at December sentencing.
- (5). Charge will be dismissed at February 2017 sentencing.
- (6). Charge will be dismissed at May 2017 sentencing.
- (7). Charge dismissed on September 6; no Oregon trial.
- (8). Charge dismissed on October 3.
- (9). Not guilty verdict declared for charge on October 27.
- (10). Hung jury declared for charge on October 27.
- (11). Acquitted of the initial conspiracy charge, but found guilty of digging ditches.
- PG. Pleaded guilty.
- TBD. To be determined.
- TS. Time served.

Penalties for the offenses are as follows:

- Conspiracy to impede or injure officer of the U.S.—fine or up to six years' imprisonment
- Possession of firearms and dangerous weapons in federal facilities—fine or up to five years' imprisonment if used in the commission of a crime
- Use and carry of firearm in relation to a crime of violence—imprisonment for minimum five years to life (dependent on type of firearm used), consecutive to any other sentences passed
- Depredation of government property of value greater than US$1,000—fine or up to ten years' imprisonment
- Theft of government property of value greater than US$1,000—fine or up to ten years' imprisonment

=== Other arrests and charges ===
- Cliven D. Bundy, 74, of Bunkerville, Nevada, was arrested on the night of February 10 by the FBI at the Portland International Airport while he was on his way to support the standoff at the refuge. He faces federal charges related to his own standoff with the BLM in 2014.
- Joseph Stetson, 54, of Woodburn, Oregon, was arrested on January 25 by the Oregon State Police in Burns for driving under the influence while en route to the refuge. He was drunk and threatened to kill police as he was being arrested.

== Legal proceedings ==
=== Pretrial court appearances ===
==== January–February 2016 ====
Ammon Bundy, Ryan Bundy, Ryan Payne, Dylan Anderson, and Jason Patrick all appeared in court on January 29. Ammon Bundy stood in court and explained the motives of the occupation to U.S. Magistrate Judge Stacie F. Beckerman, saying that "[his] only goal from the beginning was to protect freedom for the people." However, he and the other militants were denied bail, with the judge saying she would not release them while the occupation continues.

Shawna Cox was released on bail on January 29 and ordered to home detention with extensive conditions. Nineteen days later, she filed a countersuit against the U.S. government in the U.S. District Court for the District of Oregon. In it, she claimed to be a "sovereign citizen" instead of "a subject of corporate United States of America" and accused any judge who is a member of a state bar association or the Federal Bar Association of being "Foreign Agents operating subversively within United States." Her suit demanded "damages from the works of the devil in excess $666,666,666,666.66." The document was quickly dismissed by a judge, saying that her claims were "not cognizable in this criminal proceeding and will not be addressed in this case." During her home detention, she made online statements about the case and urged people to travel to Montana and provide shelter for militant Jake Edward Ryan, who had been on the run from federal authorities at the time.

Duane Ehmer was released on home detention on February 4 and is being monitored via GPS. He was released from jail on February 5 after it was ruled that his connections to Irrigon were strong and that he did not pose a flight risk.

David Fry, Sean and Sandra Anderson, and Jeff Banta, the last four militants to surrender in the occupation, appeared in court on February 12, a day after their surrender. Also appearing were militants Darryl William Thorn and Geoffrey Stanek. They were all charged with several offenses, with all six pleading not guilty. Stanek claimed that he had gone to the refuge to act as a medic and that he had been cooperating with the investigation, though U.S. District Judge John V. Acosta expressed concerns about him being armed during the occupation and the fact that he had been armed during his arrest.

Also on February 12, Wesley Kjar appeared in federal court in Salt Lake City, Utah, while Blaine Cooper made a separate court appearance in St. George, Utah. Kjar was denied release from jail with conditions on February 16 after being judged as a flight risk and a danger to the community.

Sandra Anderson was released from jail on February 19 under the conditions that she remain in her home state of Idaho unless she needed to make court appearances in Oregon; would not make any contact with the other militants, including her husband; and not possess any firearms. She was also ordered to undergo a mental health evaluation. She was released after U.S. Magistrate Judge Janice M. Stewart ruled that she is not a flight risk because she has no criminal history and has held a steady job.

Ten of the jailed militants, including Ammon Bundy, appeared in court on February 24, when U.S. District Judge Anna J. Brown stated that she would push to try them on the federal conspiracy charges as soon as possible. During the hearing, several of the militants challenged her assertions; and two of them, Ryan Bundy and Kenneth Medenbach, expressed their wishes to represent themselves. Bundy and Medenbach's requests were later granted by Judge Brown.

Jeff Banta was released from jail on February 26 under the conditions that he would not make any contact with the other militants and not make any statements in support of illegal activity.

==== March–May 2016 ====
On March 29, a federal judge lifted Shawna Cox's home detention and replaced it with a curfew under the condition that she not make any public comments regarding the case.

On April 19, Kenneth Medenbach was convicted by a federal court in Eugene, Oregon, of unlawfully occupying and camping on federal public land managed by the BLM in Josephine County, Oregon, in 2015.

On April 28, some of the lawyers of the militants began urging the court to dismiss certain counts specified in the February indictment. They claimed that the federal conspiracy charge was "unconstitutionally vague" and that the firearm charge is inadmissible because a violent crime wasn't committed during the course of the occupation.

The militants' lawyers began expressing concerns about an impartial jury during the actual trial on May 4. One lawyer "suggested the possibility of change of venue, and asked a federal judge to approve funding for an analysis of the media attention the case received and, possibly, a survey of community attitudes." U.S. District Judge Anna J. Brown did not respond to the suggestion, but it was reported that she was "more agreeable" to have jurors originate from different areas throughout Oregon rather than just Portland, which was the original plan.

On May 11, Jason Patrick was allowed by Judge Brown to represent himself in his case, though his request to not have standby counsel was denied.

On May 12, Scott Willingham pleaded guilty to one of two counts of theft of government property filed against him, being the first of the militants to submit a guilty plea. Under a plea bargain, Willingham will face six months in prison, followed by two years of supervised release, and he also agreed to undergo a mental health evaluation and pay an unspecified amount of restitution to the U.S. government.

On May 19, Corey Lequieu pleaded guilty to conspiracy to impede federal officers as part of a plea bargain deal reached by his attorneys and federal prosecutors, being the first militant to do so. His sentencing was set for August 25, with prosecutors intending to recommend a sentence of two and a half years in prison along with a required payment of restitution to the government. In exchange for the guilty plea, prosecutors agreed to drop the weapons charges as well as charges relating to the 2014 Bundy standoff.

On May 25, Ammon Bundy's defense team filed a "notice of substitution of counsel" in the U.S. District Court for the District of Oregon, replacing attorneys Lissa Casey and Michael Arnold for Utah attorney J. Morgan Philpot.

==== June–August 2016 ====
On June 2, Jake Ryan and Travis Cox were released on bail to family members pending trial. Both men were released under the conditions that their parents report any bail violations; and that the men find employment, obey curfews and travel restrictions, and refrain from contact with militias or participation in other protests or public comment on the case. Prosecutors opposed the motion on the basis of previous attempts by the men to avoid arrest, and commented on the recent ejection of Darryl Thorn from a Donald Trump rally while on similar terms of release.

On June 7, Ammon Bundy's lawyer J. Morgan Philpot filed a pro hac vice special admission in the U.S. District Court for the District of Oregon to allow Utah attorney Marcus Mumford to assist him.

On June 9, Eric Lee Flores pleaded guilty to a federal conspiracy charge as part of a plea bargain deal.

On June 10, U.S. District Judge Anna J. Brown dismissed one of two firearms charges against the Bundy brothers, David Fry, Jon Ritzheimer, Ryan Payne, Brian Cavalier, Jason Patrick, and Sean Anderson. She cited that the underlying conspiracy charge does not meet the legal definition of a "crime of violence" as defined by Ninth Circuit case law.

From June 14 to June 23, Geoffrey Alan Stanek, Jason Blomgren, and Wesley Kjar all pleaded guilty to a federal conspiracy charge as part of plea bargain deals. On June 29, Brian Cavalier also pleaded guilty to a federal conspiracy charge, as well as a firearms possession charge, as part of a plea bargain deal. Cavalier's plea deal does not affect federal charges pending against him in Nevada.

On June 30, Ammon Bundy's defense team filed a motion asking for a delay for their client's September 7 trial, explaining they needed more time to prepare for the defense. In the motion, the defense team argued that several pretrial motions were not resolved and Bundy's detention "has rendered it virtually impossible for him to participate meaningfully in his defense." The lawyers also asked the court to "allow Bundy another two months to argue for his release pending trial and to help prepare his defense to challenge the federal charges." This latest action prompted Bundy's brother Ryan and other militants, on July 1, to file similar motions asking for delays in their trials. On July 6, U.S. District Judge Anna J. Brown denied Ammon Bundy's defense request for a delay in trial.

On July 7, Blaine Cooper pleaded guilty to a federal conspiracy charge.

On July 19, Ryan Payne pleaded guilty to a federal conspiracy charge for his role in the occupation, as well as three federal charges related to the 2014 Bundy standoff, as part of a plea bargain deal.

On July 20, Travis Cox pleaded guilty to a federal conspiracy charge as part of a plea bargain deal.

On August 1, Joseph O'Shaughnessy pleaded guilty to a federal conspiracy charge and is expected to do the same to federal charges related to the Bundy standoff. That same day, Kenneth Medenbach was sentenced to five years' probation for unlawfully occupying and camping on federal public land in Josephine County, Oregon, in 2015.

On August 15, Jon Ritzheimer pleaded guilty to a federal conspiracy charge as part of a plea bargain deal.

On August 22, U.S. District Judge Robert E. Jones admonished Duane Ehmer for writing a threatening post against liberal Democrats on Facebook, which has since been deleted. As a result, Jones added a new condition for Ehmer's release, to "not engage in conduct or speech that will incite others to trespass on or destroy federal property, or engage in violence."

On August 30, Judge Brown granted Ryan Bundy and Kenneth Medenbach the right to represent themselves, despite Bundy and Medenbach's repeated defiance of her rulings and willingness to violate court orders. Medenbach subsequently agreed to follow Brown's rulings and instructions in exchange. Bundy remained more defiant with this requirement and asserted he would follow rulings only as long as "they are in accordance with the law"; Brown later said she believed that he was "reserving" his right to follow rulings based on his own interpretation of the law, but decided to give him "the benefit of the doubt".

Also on August 30, David Fry's lawyer announced his intention to argue that his client has schizotypal personality disorder, claiming that he had been quiet and mostly kept to himself at the refuge during the occupation until the shooting death of LaVoy Finicum. Fry's lawyer also claimed that after Finicum's shooting, Fry became paranoid that federal agents were going to come after him and escalated his actions as a result.

==== September 2016 ====
On September 6, Judge Brown approved federal prosecutors' request to dismiss the federal conspiracy charge against Peter Santilli, the only charge he faced for his role in the occupation. He later said that he was not angry over his eight-month ordeal.

On September 7, Ammon and Ryan Bundy (through Ammon's lawyers, Philpot and Marcus Mumford), filed a motion seeking to permit his client to wear "cowboy" attire in court. The U.S. Marshals Service has barred the defendants from wearing ties, boots, and belts, citing safety concerns. Denying the motion on grounds that the Bundys not showing their attire would prejudice their case, Judge Brown said Ammon was "dressed better than most people in the building, period."

== Trials ==
=== Preparation ===
The trials for Bundy and six other co-defendants was scheduled to start on September 7, 2016; while a further seven co-defendants were set for trial beginning February 14, 2017. On August 3, about 1,500 potential jurors were summoned and asked to complete questionnaires that would be reviewed by the attorneys and parties involved in the September 7, 2016, trials. Judge Brown previously said the case would require an unusually large jury pool.

=== September 2016 ===
Jury selection for the first set of trials began on September 7, 2016. On that day, eleven of 31 potential jurors were excused for a variety of reasons, such as opinions regarding the occupation and also personal hardships. By September 9, 2016, 62 people were identified as potential jurors. Twelve jurors (consisting of eight women and four men) and eight alternates were selected by the end of the day. Opening statements were scheduled for September 13, 2016.

On September 12, Jeff Banta, one of the defendants for the first set of trials, had to correct Judge Brown's accidental error in leaving out firearms charges while recounting the charges against him. He also said he traveled to the refuge on January 25 to help bring attention to the Hammond arson case, an issue raised by the militants during the occupation's first days. He added that he also wanted to work on the Hammond ranch while Dwight and Steven Hammond were still imprisoned.

On September 13, opening statements were given, with a line of about a dozen people present outside the courthouse. The prosecution argued that Ammon Bundy and the other militants were leading an armed occupation of the refuge and not a political protest. The defense argued that the militants were not intending to interfere with refuge activities, but to restore local control of lands in the Western United States, as they were frustrated by the federal government's grazing and water rights restrictions on public land.

On September 14, Sheriff David Ward, who was the lead local law enforcement official during the occupation, was the first to testify against the militants.

=== Sentencing ===
On August 16, Corey Lequieu became the first defendant to be sentenced in the federal conspiracy case against the militants. Judge Brown sentenced him to two-and-a-half years in prison, followed by three years of supervised release, and also ordered him to pay restitution. Though the conspiracy charge carried a maximum of six years' imprisonment, his sentencing was recommended by prosecutors as part of the plea bargain deal he reached, and decided after the government considered the fact that Lequieu was the first militant to take responsibility.
