= John Sepulvado =

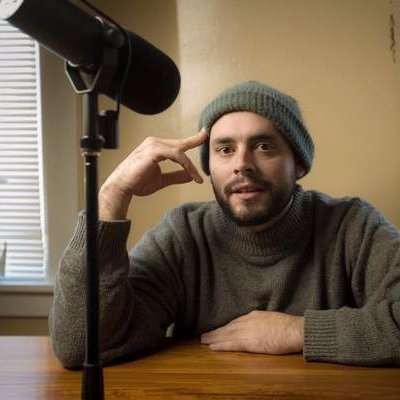
- Sepulvado, an American public radio journalist and host of KQED's California Morning Report
- Born: February 26, 1979 (age 47)
- Organization: KQED

John Sepulvado (born February 26, 1979) is a former U.S. public radio journalist and is former host of the California Morning Report on KQED.

He was the first journalist subpoenaed by the Trump administration. Sepulvado covered the occupation of the Malheur National Wildlife Refuge and the 2017 Las Vegas shooting for NPR. He previously reported for CNN as radio national correspondent, He won an Online Journalism Award for leading breaking news reporting of the Bundy standoff for Oregon Public Broadcasting.

== Career ==
In the early 2010s, Sepulvado was news director of XRAY.FM, a low-power community radio station in Portland, Oregon. He also worked for or at CNN, Public Radio International, and KNPR, and was weekend morning host for Oregon Public Broadcasting.

On February 16, 2017, Sepulvado received a subpoena from federal prosecutors to testify about an interview he conducted with Ryan Bundy, one of the leaders of the group that occupied the Malheur National Wildlife Refuge. When Sepulvado was initially asked to voluntarily testify under the Obama Administration in 2016, the Justice Department did not issue a subpoena that would force him to comply. But under the Trump Administration, one week after Attorney General Jeff Sessions was sworn in, Sessions personally approved a subpoena for Sepulvado, who subsequently filed a motion to fight the order in federal court. Sepulvado argued that complying with the court order would “chill future sources, even nonconfidential ones” for himself and other Oregon Public Broadcasting reporters. On February 24, 2017, a federal judge ruled in Sepulvado's favor against the Justice Department and quashed the subpoena.

Sepulvado covered rallies organized by alt-right and white nationalist groups in the San Francisco Bay Area in 2017, including coverage of Identity Evropa founder Nathan Damigo. In 2011, he covered the London Riot for CNN, establishing that the violent riots in and around the Tottenham area of London were stoked by crime bosses that directed drug dealers to loot local businesses. He also reported on the violent Belfast City Hall flag protests in 2013, when Protestant rioters attacked Catholics after the Belfast City Council voted to limit the days it flew the Union Flag. Sepulvado covered the prison riots in Northern Ireland organized by jailed provisional Irish Republican Army members in 2011 for the German news outlet Deutsche Welle.

On January 29, 2019, Sepulvado announced on Twitter that he was leaving journalism for good. The next day, he told Politico that he had signed a deal with Turner Broadcasting to produce podcasts, and would be doing humanitarian work along the United States-Mexico border.

It was announced on the California report on February 8, 2019, that Sepulvado had "moved on." It's unclear what led to his sudden departure.

== Personal life ==
Sepulvado is of Irish, Scottish, and Mexican descent. His great-great-grandfather was governor of the Mexican Republic departamento of California and secessionist Juan Bautista Alvarado. Sepulvado grew up in Lemon Grove in eastern San Diego County, and spent his high school years in foster care. After dropping out of high school, Sepulvado traveled the United States, living in several cities. He attended Florida A&M University on a journalism scholarship. Sepulvado has two children. He is also a recovering drug addict who speaks openly about his experience treating addiction.
