= Crescent, Oregon =

Unincorporated community in the state of Oregon, United States

- Unincorporated community
- Location within Oregon Location within the United States
- Coordinates: 43°27′18″N 121°42′04″W
- Country: United States
- State: Oregon
- County: Klamath

Area
  - Total: 1.17 sq mi (3.04 km^{2})
  - Land: 1.17 sq mi (3.02 km^{2})
  - Water: 0.0077 sq mi (0.02 km^{2})
- Elevation: 4,462 ft (1,360 m)

Population (2020)
  - Total: 412
  - Density: 353.4/sq mi (136.43/km^{2})
- Time zone: UTC-8 (Pacific (PST))
  - Summer (DST): UTC-7 (PDT)
- ZIP code: 97733
- Area code: 541
- GNIS feature ID: 2805449

Crescent is an unincorporated community in Klamath County, Oregon, United States. As of the 2020 census, Crescent had a population of 412. Crescent is along U.S. Route 97 about 47 miles (76 km) south-southwest of Bend. Crescent has a post office with ZIP code 97733.

== Climate ==
This region experiences warm (but not hot) and dry summers, with no average monthly temperatures above 71.6 °F (22.0 °C). According to the Köppen Climate Classification system, Crescent has a warm-summer Mediterranean climate, abbreviated "Csb" on climate maps.

== Demographics ==
Historical population
Census	Pop.	Note	%±
2020	412		—
U.S. Decennial Census

== Education ==
It is within the Klamath County School District.

It is in the territory of Central Oregon Community College.
