= Backcountry Hunters & Anglers =

Non-profit sportsmen's organization

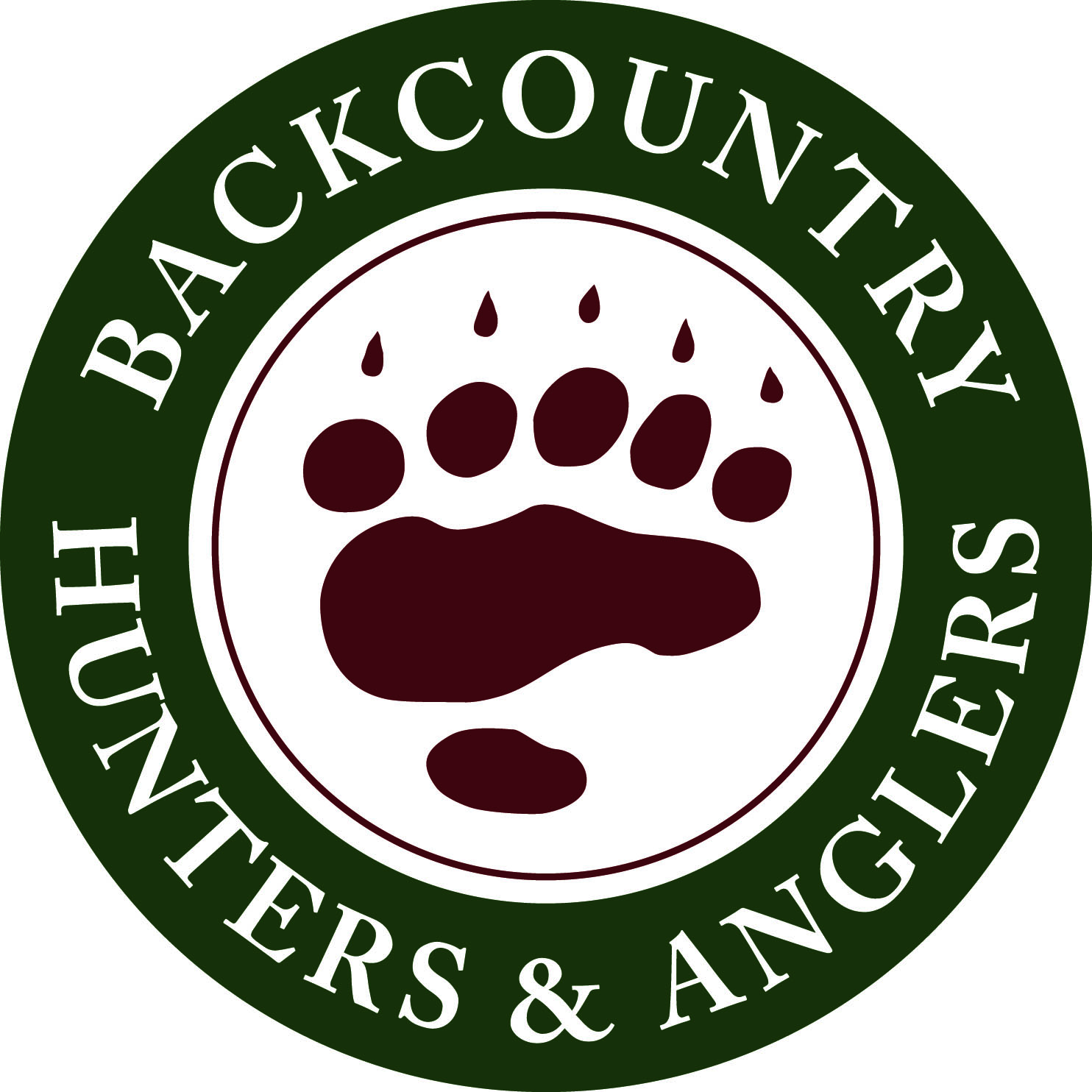

Backcountry Hunters & Anglers (BHA) is a non-profit sportsmen's organization that is based in Montana, USA. The group looks to preserve North America's outdoor heritage of hunting and fishing through public education and advocacy. Backcountry Hunters & Anglers works to prevent the development of wild land in North America and follows the North American Model of Wildlife Conservation as a basis for its positions.

The organization was "born around an Oregon campfire in 2004" and has chapters in 48 states, as well as the Canadian provinces of Alberta and British Columbia, and the Yukon Territory. The organization has 40,000 members in North America.

Ryan Callaghan is the group's president/CEO.

== Issues ==
Backcountry Hunters & Anglers main issues are:

- Preventing excessive off-road vehicle traffic on wild land
- Educating the public on hunting and fishing
- Preserving natural forests and public lands from development

The group supports federal ownership of federal public lands and is opposed to legislation that would transfer ownership of these lands to states or private interests. The organization supports legislation to ban the use of drones while hunting, calling the technique unethical.

== Local BHA Chapters ==
=== Provinces with chapters in Canada ===
- Alberta
- British Columbia
- Yukon Territory

=== States with chapters in the United States ===
- Alaska
- Kentucky
- Washington
- Montana
- Idaho
- Oregon
- Wyoming
- California
- Nevada
- Texas
- Utah
- Colorado
- South Dakota
- Minnesota
- Wisconsin
- Michigan
- Maine
- Vermont
- New Hampshire
- New York
- New Mexico
- North Dakota
- Massachusetts
- Rhode Island
- Connecticut
- Maryland
- Tennessee
- Mississippi
- Arkansas
- Louisiana
- Georgia
- Florida
- Virginia
- Arizona
