= Landlocked parcel =

A landlocked parcel is a real estate plot that has no legal access to a public right of way. Generally, a landlocked parcel has less value than a parcel that is not landlocked. Often, the owner of a landlocked parcel can obtain access to a public roadway by easement.

== See also ==
- Landlocked country
