= Bundy standoff =

2014 armed confrontation in Nevada, US

- Date: Legal process: 1993 – January 8, 2018; Confrontation: April 5, 2014 – May 2014
- Location: Bunkerville, Clark County, Nevada, United States; 36°43′00″N 114°14′19″W
- Caused by: Protest over Bureau of Land Management roundup of trespass cattle pursuant to court order and shooting of cattle; Unpaid cattle grazing fees on public domain lands
- Goals: The BLM seeks to round up and remove from the range trespass cattle owned by Bundy; ATF to oversee operations to prevent the roundup of his cattle and have his claim of grazing rights recognized
- Result: The BLM suspends the roundup of trespassing cattle and Bundys cattle is returned; Protesters disperse; Incident defused; Cliven Bundy and 18 others indicted for federal felonies; All charges against Cliven Bundy, two sons, and a co-defendant dismissed with prejudice

Parties
United States; Bureau of Alcohol, Tobacco, Firearms and Explosives (ATF); Bureau of Land Management (BLM); Federal Bureau of Investigation (FBI); Nevada; Nevada Highway Patrol (NHP); Clark County; Clark County Sheriff; Las Vegas Metropolitan Police Department (LVMPD); Las Vegas Tribe of Paiute Indians of the Las Vegas Indian Colony; Moapa Band of Paiute Indians of the Moapa River Indian Reservation	3 Percenters; Constitutional Sheriffs and Peace Officers Association (CSPOA); Oath Keepers; Praetorian Guard; White Mountain Militia; Missouri Citizens Militia (MCM); Armed and unarmed protesters that were able to communicate through online chats including CalGuns.Net (MK) and various unarmed protesters

Lead figures
Neil Kornze (Director of the Bureau of Land Management): (Nevada) Brian Sandoval (former Governor); (Nevada) Brian Krolicki (former Lieutenant Governor); (Nevada) Mark Hutchison (former Lieutenant Governor and former state senator); Douglas C. Gillespie (former Clark County Sheriff); Joe Lombardo (former Clark County Under Sheriff, later Clark County Sheriff, and current Nevada Governor); Kevin C. McMahill (current Clark County Under Sheriff)	Chuck Baldwin: LaVoy Finicum; Ammon Bundy; Cliven Bundy; Cliven Lance Bundy; Ryan Bundy; Brian Cavalier; Blaine Cooper; Thomas Lacovara; Richard Mack; Gordon Martines; Ryan Payne; Stewart Rhodes; Jon Ritzheimer; Pete Santilli; David Lory VanDerBeek; Joseph Davis; Wesley Kajar; Neil Wampler
- Approximate location of Bunkerville Bundy standoff (the United States)

Cliven Bundy speaking at a forum hosted by the American Academy for Constitutional Education

The 2014 Bundy standoff was an armed confrontation between supporters of cattle rancher Cliven Bundy and law enforcement following a 21-year legal dispute in which the United States Bureau of Land Management (BLM) obtained court orders directing Bundy to pay over $1 million in withheld grazing fees for Bundy's use of federally owned land adjacent to Bundy's ranch in southeastern Nevada.

On March 27, 2014, 145,604 acres (589 km^{2}) of federal land in Clark County were temporarily closed for the "capture, impound, and removal of trespass cattle." BLM officials and law enforcement rangers began a roundup of such livestock on April 5, and Cliven Bundy's son, Dave, was arrested. On April 12, 2014, a group of protesters, some of them armed, approached the BLM "cattle gather." Sheriff Doug Gillespie negotiated with Bundy and newly confirmed BLM director, Neil Kornze, who elected to release the cattle and de-escalate the situation. The standoff drew support from some conservative and libertarian groups opposed to federal land policies, while the BLM faced criticism for its handling of the dispute, including the use of armed agents. As of the end of 2024, Cliven Bundy continued to graze his cattle on federal land with BLM refusing to comment or interfere.

The ongoing dispute started in 1993, when, in defiance to the legitimacy of nationally accepted federal jurisdictional authority, and to protest against changes in grazing rules, Bundy declined to renew his permit for cattle grazing on BLM-administered public lands near Bunkerville, Nevada. According to Bundy's commonly described anti-government ideological position, the federal government lacks the constitutional authority to own vast tracts of lands, an argument repeatedly rejected by federal courts. According to the BLM, Bundy continued to graze his cattle on public lands without a permit. In 1998, Bundy was prohibited by the United States District Court for the District of Nevada from grazing his cattle on an area of land later called the Bunkerville Allotment. In July 2013, federal judge Lloyd D. George ordered Bundy to refrain from trespassing on federally administered land in the Gold Butte area of Clark County, Nevada.

Cliven and his son Ammon Bundy, and their supporters, have claimed that the federal government lacks the authority to manage public lands. These arguments have been repeatedly rejected by legal scholars and federal courts, including the U.S. Supreme Court; the property clause of the United States Constitution grants plenary authority to Congress to manage federal property, including land.

== Background ==
=== History ===
Map of all federally owned land in the United States. The area in yellow represents land managed by the Bureau of Land Management

In 1848, as part of the Treaty of Guadalupe Hidalgo, which officially ended the American-Mexican War of 1846-1848, land that is now the southwestern region of the United States was acquired from Mexico. Since then, the government has continuously owned land in what is now Nevada, including the Bunkerville Allotment. The Nevada Territory was partitioned in 1861 from the Utah Territory, and became a state in 1864. The original settlers in the 1840s and 1850s were Mormons from Utah and southern small-time farmers and ranchers from Louisiana, Arkansas, and Mississippi. After the end of the American Civil War, much of the land was settled by rural farmers, squatters and small-time cattle ranchers from Oklahoma, Texas, Arkansas, Louisiana, Missouri and Kansas, escaping from the post–Civil War Reconstruction and the associated violence and displacement. Since 1934 federal rangelands in Nevada have been managed principally by either the Bureau of Land Management or its predecessor, the United States Grazing Service, or the United States Forest Service. As of 2010, 47.8 million acres (more than two-thirds of Nevada's 70.3 million acres) were managed by the BLM. Throughout the nation, the BLM manages nearly 18,000 grazing permits and leases, of which about 700 are in Nevada. The season of use and the details of forage are stipulated in permits and leases; thus federal control can be exerted on the land used for grazing.

=== Permits ===
Under BLM permits first issued in 1954, Bundy grazed his cattle legally and paid his grazing fees on the Bunkerville Allotment until 1993. In 1989, the federal government declared the desert tortoise an endangered species and began negotiating a habitat conservation plan in Clark County, Nevada, to meet the needs of both the tortoise and the people, such as Bundy, who were using the land. In mid-1991, the United States Fish and Wildlife Service approved a short-term conservation plan that allowed for development of about 22,000 acres of tortoise habitat in and around Las Vegas in exchange for strict conservation measures on 400,000 acres of federal BLM land south of the city. This included the elimination of livestock grazing and strict limits on off-road vehicle use in the protected tortoise habitat. In 1993, a permanent conservation plan was put into place that more than doubled the conservation area, and included the Bunkerville Allotment.

Unlike many ranchers, Bundy refused to sell his grazing privileges back to the federal government. Instead, as a protest, Bundy did not pay his renewal fees in 1993. His permit was canceled in 1994. Although the agency made several attempts to have Bundy renew the permit, he declared that he no longer recognized the BLM's authority to regulate grazing, and asserted that he had "vested rights" to graze cattle on the land. Federal courts have consistently ruled against Bundy on grazing rights, ruling him a trespasser with no right to graze on federal land. The courts authorized the BLM to remove Bundy's cattle and to levy damages for his unauthorized use.

Bundy accumulated more than $1 million in unpaid grazing fees and court-ordered fines. The Portland Oregonian newspaper reported in May 2014 that the amount that Bundy owed stood in "stark contrast" to the situation in Oregon, where just 45 of the state's roughly 1,100 grazing permit holders collectively owed $18,759 (~$25,512 in 2025) in past-due payments to the BLM, and only two ranchers had unpaid fees more than 60 days past due. Excluding Bundy's unpaid fees, the total of all late grazing fees owed nationwide to the BLM was only $237,000.

=== Bundy's worldview ===
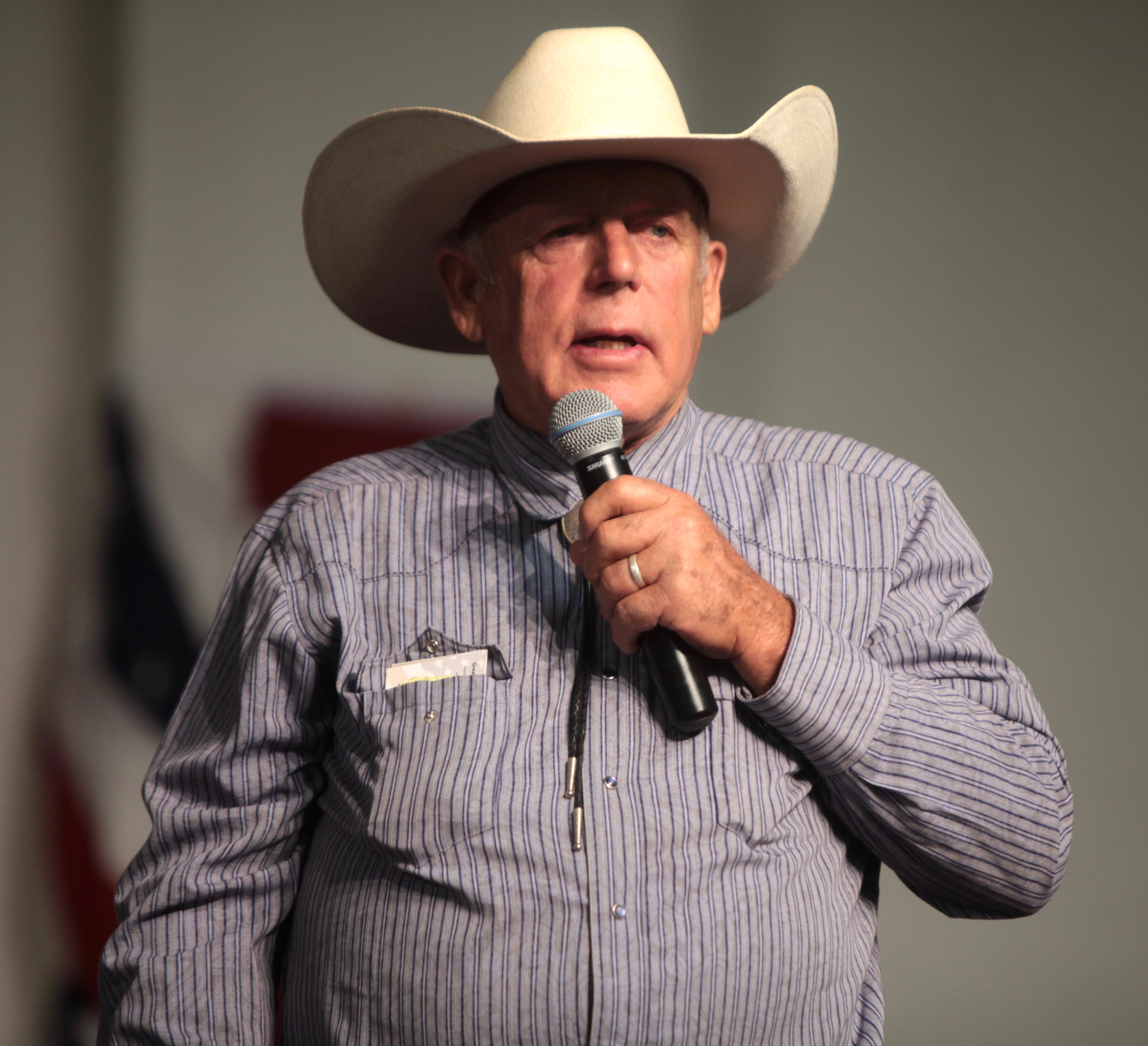
Cliven Bundy in 2014

Bundy has said that he does not recognize federal police power over land that he believes belongs to the "sovereign state of Nevada." He also denies the jurisdiction of the federal court system over Nevada land and he filed an unsuccessful motion to dismiss the BLM case against him, saying that the federal courts have no jurisdiction because he is a "citizen of Nevada, not the territory of Nevada." and that federally owned land in Nevada actually belongs to the state. According to The Guardian, Bundy told his supporters that "We definitely don't recognize [the BLM director's] jurisdiction or authority, his arresting power or policing power in any way," and in interviews he used the language of the sovereign citizen movement, thereby gaining the support of members of the Oath Keepers, the White Mountain Militia and the Praetorian Guard militias. The FBI considers sovereign citizen extremism a domestic terrorism threat.

J. J. MacNab, who writes for Forbes about anti-government extremism, described Bundy's views as inspired by the sovereign citizen movement, whose adherents believe that the county sheriff is the most powerful law-enforcement officer in the country, with authority superior to that of any federal agent, local law-enforcement agency or any other elected official. On April 12, 2014, Bundy "ordered" Clark County Sheriff Doug Gillespie to confront the federal agents, disarm them and deliver their arms to Bundy within an hour of his demand, and later expressed disappointment that Gillespie did not comply.

The Southern Poverty Law Center has described Bundy's views as closely aligned with those of the Posse Comitatus organization, and says that such views focus on secession, nullification, state sovereignty and the principles of the Tenther movement.

Bundy was at first praised by some Republican politicians and conservative personalities. On April 19, 2014, Bundy said that "the negroes" "were basically on government subsidy, so now what do they do?" Bundy said. "They abort their young children, they put their young men in jail, because they never learned how to pick cotton. And I've often wondered, are they better off as slaves, picking cotton and having a family life and doing things, or are they better off under government subsidy? They didn't get no more freedom. They got less freedom." After his comments, Bundy was repudiated by some conservative politicians and talk-show hosts who had previously supported him. Many condemned his remarks as racist.

In May 2014, Bundy changed his political affiliation from the Republican Party to the Independent American Party.

=== Cancellation of 1996 cattle removal ===
Alan O'Neill, superintendent of the Lake Mead National Recreation Area from 1987 through 2000, is a retired National Park Service official whose tenure at Lake Mead included the early years of the Bundy dispute. He wrote that he was "told to back off at one point because of concern for violence." In 1996, the National Park Service made plans to remove cattle that were illegally trespassing in Lake Mead NRA. O'Neill recalls veiled threats similar to those made against government workers during the 2014 round-up. Against this background, he says, "the U.S. attorney's office told us to back off," and the operation was canceled.

=== Grazing on federal rangeland in Nevada ===
The Taylor Grazing Act of 1934 (TGA) regulates grazing on public lands (excluding Alaska) to improve rangeland conditions. The Bureau of Land Management (BLM) manages about 167 million acres (676,000 km^{2}) of publicly owned rangeland in the United States, with the United States Forest Service managing approximately 95 million acres (380,000 km^{2}) more. Permittees on federal rangelands are required to pay a fee, and the permit cannot exceed ten years but is renewable.

== United States v. Bundy ==
United States v. Bundy
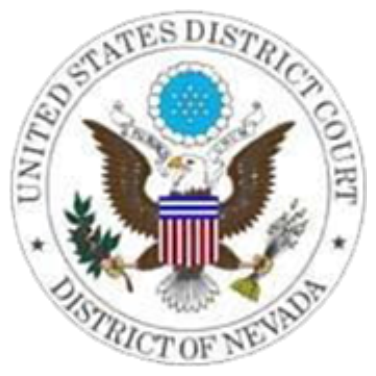
- Court: United States District Court for the District of Nevada
- Full case name: United States of America, Plaintiff, v. Cliven Bundy, Defendant.
- Decided: July 9, 2013 and October 8, 2013
- Defendants: Cliven Bundy, pro se
- Prosecution: 1. Ignacia S. Moreno; 2. Daniel G. Bogden
- Transcripts: May 2012 – Complaint; June 2012 – Answer by Defendant; Dec 2012 – Plaintiff's Motion for Summary Judgment; January 2013 – Defendant's Opposition to Plaintiff's Motion for Summary Judgment and Defendant's Cross-Motion to Dismiss; February 2013 – Plaintiff's Reply in Further Support of its Summary Judgment Motion and in Opposition to Defendant's Cross-Motion to Dismiss; February 2013 – Defendant's Reply in Further Support of His Cross-Motion to Dismiss; Evidentiary Hearing Requested; February 2013 – Plaintiff's Opposition to Defendant's Request for Evidentiary Hearing; February 2013 – Defendant's Reply in Further Support of Request for Evidentiary Hearing; July 2013 – Court Order Granting Plaintiff's Motion for Summary Judgment and Denying Defendant's Motion to Dismiss as Moot; Oct 2013 Court Order

Case history
- Prior action: 1998, order by the same court

Holding
- Bundy is permanently enjoined from trespass, Bundy shall remove livestock within 45 days, The United States is entitled to seize and impound cattle.

Court membership
- Judges sitting: 1. Lloyd D. George; 2. Larry R. Hicks

The case of United States v. Bundy played out over many years in the United States District Court for the District of Nevada. It involved court orders, injunctions, and notices. Bundy argued pro se (without a lawyer) that the land belongs to the state. The Bureau of Land Management was represented by the U.S. Attorney's Office for Nevada and the United States Department of Justice. District Judge Larry R. Hicks ruled that the land on which Bundy was grazing his cattle was indeed owned by the federal government, that Bundy had not been paying to use it as he should have been, that Bundy was trespassing, and that the government had the right to enforce the injunctions against trespass. Hicks found that Bundy had repeatedly violated court orders.

=== 1998–2012: Legal actions ===
United States v. Bundy "arose out of Bundy's unauthorized grazing of his livestock on property owned by the United States and administered by the Department of the Interior through the BLM and the National Park Service." On November 3, 1998, United States District Judge Johnnie B. Rawlinson "permanently enjoined (Bundy) from grazing his livestock within the Bunkerville Allotment ("The Allotment"), and shall remove his livestock from this allotment on or before November 30, 1998 ... (and) ordered that Plaintiff shall be entitled to trespass damages from Bundy in the amount of $200.00 per day per head for any livestock belonging to Bundy remaining on the Bunkerville Allotment after November 30, 1998." Rawlinson wrote that "[t]he government has shown commendable restraint in allowing this trespass to continue for so long without impounding Bundy's livestock." This sentence was restated on October 8, 2013, by District Judge Larry R. Hicks. On September 17, 1999, after Bundy failed to comply with the court's earlier order(s), the court issued another order directing Bundy to comply with the 1998 permanent injunction and modifying the trespass damages owed.

=== 2012–2015: Legal actions ===
Bundy's cattle expanded into additional public land over the years. A planned April 2012 roundup of his cattle was called off when Bundy made violent threats against the Bureau of Land Management. The bureau's requests for assistance from the Las Vegas Metropolitan Police Department were met by a demand of Sheriff Doug Gillespie that the bureau seek a new warrant because, he said, the original 1998 order had become "stale."

Because of Gillespie's demand, in May 2012 the government filed a second United States v. Bundy case, (Note: Case No. 2:12-cv-0804-LDG-GWF) seeking renewed enforcement authority for the original court orders along with relief for Bundy's trespassing on a new set of additional lands not covered by the original 1998 ruling: "including public lands within the Gold Butte area that are administered by the BLM, and National Park System land within the Overton Arm and Gold Butte areas of the Lake Mead National Recreation Area." On December 21, 2012, the United States moved for summary judgment in this new case, and this motion was granted in an order signed by Senior District Judge Lloyd D. George on July 9, 2013. The ruling permanently enjoined Bundy and his cattle from trespassing on the New Trespass Lands. Another order was issued by Judge Larry R. Hicks on October 8, 2013, which stemmed from the earlier 1998 civil action against Bundy. The order allows the United States to "protect the ... Bunkerville Allotment against ... trespass" by Bundy and "to seize and remove to impound" any of his cattle that remain in those areas.

== Court judgments against Bundy's claims ==
The Cliven Bundy family owns a 160-acre farm southwest of Bunkerville, which serves as headquarters and base property for the family's ranching operation on nearby public lands. The farm property was purchased by the Bundy family in 1948, after they moved from Bundyville, Arizona, and Bundy has claimed that he inherited "pre-emptive grazing rights" on public domain land because some of his maternal grandmother's ancestors had kept cattle in the Virgin Valley beginning in 1877. Bundy alternatively argued in legal cases that federal grazing rules infringe on Nevada's rights.

=== Claim of inherited grazing rights ===
There are no legally recognized inherited grazing rights, preemptive rights, special rights, or grandfathered public-domain land-use rights held by the Bundy family or Bundy's ancestors. Bundy lost his special-rights arguments in the United States v. Bundy cases. Bundy had only base property and normal AUM grazing-allotment permits, like the permits of thousands of other ranchers throughout the western United States. The court found that Bundy and his father actually first began grazing their cattle on the Bunkerville Allotment in 1954 and used it for several years. They paid for cattle grazing again from 1973 until 1993, when Bundy paid the last fees for his final grazing application for the period from December 1, 1992, through February 28, 1993. On January 24, 1994, the Bureau of Land Management delivered a Proposed Decision Order to Remove and Demand for Payment to Bundy by placing it on the dashboard of Bundy's vehicle while he was in the vehicle. BLM officials allege that Bundy became agitated, descended from his truck and accused the BLM of harassing him. He then returned to his truck, threw the proposed order out of the window and drove away. One of Bundy's sons then picked up the document, tore it to pieces and threw it on the ground. On February 17, 1994, the BLM issued a final decision canceling Bundy's range-grazing permit. Bundy subsequently informed the BLM in several administrative notices that he intended to graze cattle "pursuant to my vested grazing rights." Bundy failed to demonstrate the existence of any such special rights when given an opportunity to do so in court.

=== Claim of lack of federal jurisdiction ===
Bundy lost in U.S. District Court on all his arguments regarding states' rights and jurisdiction in the United States v. Bundy cases. He had argued that the U.S. District Court for Nevada lacked jurisdiction because the U.S. did not own the public lands in question. The court ruled that "the public lands in Nevada are the property of the United States because the United States has held title to those public lands since 1848, when Mexico ceded the land to the United States." Bundy had argued that the Disclaimer Clause of the Nevada Constitution carries no legal force.

Bundy also argued that the United States' exercise of ownership over public-domain lands violated the Equal Footing Doctrine, that Article Four of the United States Constitution (the Property Clause) applied only to federal lands outside the borders of states, that the government had based its authority to sanction him on the Endangered Species Act (as opposed to an action for trespass) and that Nevada's open-range statute excused Bundy's trespass. These arguments were rejected by the court.

Lawmakers in about a half-dozen states have adopted resolutions which assert that states have sovereignty over federal land within states. Legal scholar Rob Natelson, formerly of the University of Montana, has argued that the federal government is required to dispose of public land within states, with few exceptions. However, these claims have been repeatedly rejected by federal courts, citing the Property Clause's clear grant of power to Congress to manage federal property, including land. Citing the 1840 Supreme Court case, United States v. Gratiot, which ruled that "the power over the public lands is vested in Congress by the Constitution, without limitation," Yale University legal scholar Raph Graybill wrote that "the Constitution grants the United States exclusive legal control over American public lands." University of Utah law professor Robert Keiter argued that legal efforts to demand transfer of federal public lands were not only futile as a matter of law, but counterproductive as well—by declaring federal agencies to be the enemy, "the Transfer Movement does more harm than good to the federal-state relationship needed for effective public land management."

In the Fort Leavenworth Railroad Co. v. Lowe Supreme Court decision (1885), Justice Stephen J. Field wrote that the authority of the federal government over territories is "necessarily paramount", but that once a territory is organized as a state and admitted to the union on equal footing with other states, the state government assumes concurrent jurisdiction over federal lands, and the federal government then has the rights of an "individual proprietor" over lands it owns, unless there has been a formal cession of jurisdiction over a given area by the state under the Enclave Clause. The power of proprietary rights are those of a property owner, and in Utah Power & Light Co. v. United States, a unanimous Supreme Court ruled in 1917 that as regards federal public lands, "the power of Congress is exclusive, and that only through its exercise in some form can rights in lands belonging to the United States be acquired." This was further reinforced in 1920 when the Court ruled in Cameron v. United States that the president's use of the Antiquities Act to set aside national monuments was constitutional and in 1922 in McKelvey v. United States, where the Court ruled that "It is firmly settled that Congress may prescribe rules respecting the use of the public lands. It may sanction some uses and prohibit others, and may forbid interference with such as are sanctioned" and that "states may prescribe police regulations applicable to public land areas, so long as the regulations are not arbitrary or inconsistent with applicable congressional enactments."

== Bureau of Land Management actions ==
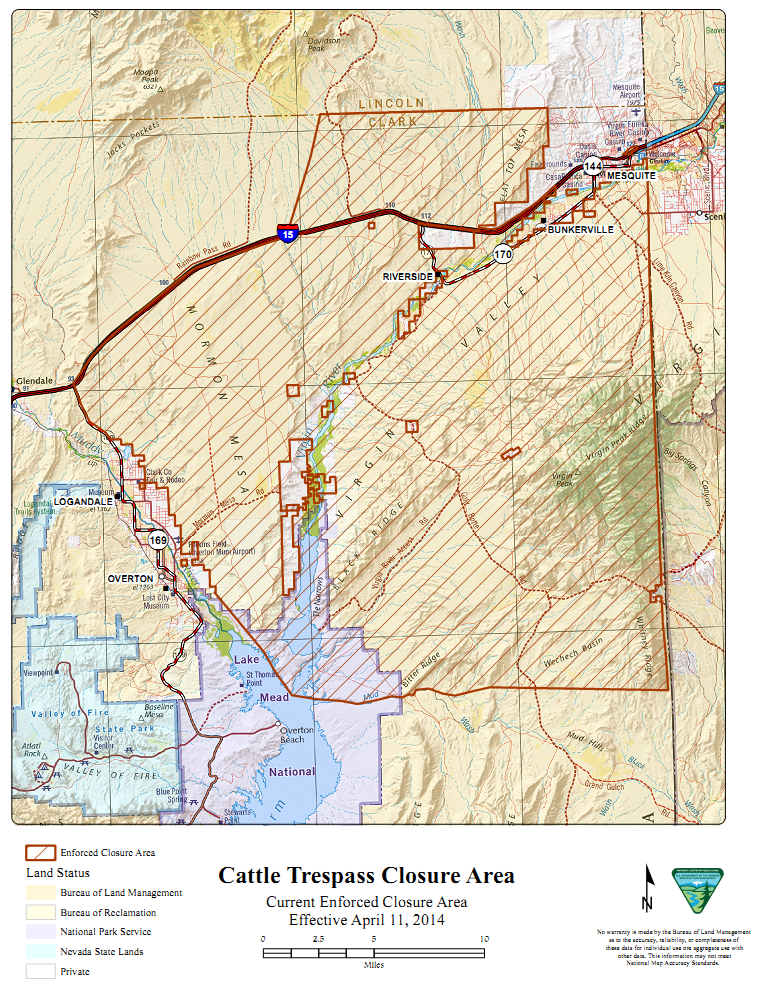
BLM Trespass Cattle Closure Map Apr 11, 2014

The BLM was tasked with environmental assessment and various enforcement issues regarding the cattle-trespass injunctions. During March and April 2014, it closed some areas of government lands during the planning for roundup of the trespass cattle owned by Bundy. In early April, "just before the roundup got underway, a survey conducted by helicopter counted 908 head of cattle scattered across roughly 1,200 square miles of remote mountains and desert managed by the Bureau of Land Management and the National Park Service." The BLM stated on its website:

Cattle have been in trespass on public lands in southern Nevada for more than two decades. This is unfair to the thousands of other ranchers who graze livestock in compliance with federal laws and regulations throughout the West. The Bureau of Land Management and the National Park Service have made repeated attempts to resolve this matter administratively and judicially. An impoundment of cattle illegally grazing on public lands is now being conducted as a last resort.

A page on the BLM website, since removed, listed the impacts of Bundy's trespass cattle. Among these were risks to people driving on roadways, destruction of crops on private property, damage to community property in the city of Mesquite, negative impacts on city facilities in Bunkerville, destruction of archaeological artifacts and unauthorized reservoir construction. The regional off-site mitigation strategies of non-governmental organizations were also delayed for the Dry Lake Solar Energy Zone, and a matching $400,000 grant from the Walton Family Foundation to restore habitat for the southwest willow flycatcher along the Virgin River was delayed on the condition that Bundy remove the trespass cattle.

=== BLM preparations and execution ===
A closure of the public lands known as Gold Butte, Mormon Mesa, and Bunkerville Flats Areas was approved by the Department of the Interior on March 24, 2014, and was to be effective March 27 to May 12, 2014. Additionally, the Federal Register stated that: "This temporary closure is necessary to limit public access, use, and occupancy during an impoundment of illegally grazing cattle to ensure the safety and welfare of the public, contractors, and government employees."

The project area consisted of 802,571 acres, primarily composed of the Bunkerville Allotment (145,604 acres) and the New Trespass Lands (451,775 acres). Portions of the project area are managed under the Bureau of Land Management, the Bureau of Reclamation, and the National Park Service. Not all of the public areas would be closed at the same time if operations were moved to another location.

No 30-day comment period or public scoping was conducted due to the confidential nature of law enforcement actions.

==== Involvement of state and local authorities; attempts to negotiate ====
Before the round-up, the Bureau of Land Management contacted state and local authorities. The bureau advised Nevada Governor Brian Sandoval and Nevada Attorney General Catherine Cortez Masto of the agency's proposed actions. Clark County sheriff Doug Gillespie relayed information from the BLM and helped negotiate an end to the standoff. In 2012 and again during the 2014 roundup, the BLM had reportedly offered to buy Bundy's cattle and give him proceeds from their eventual sale. According to Cliven Bundy's son, Ammon Bundy, Gillespie also delivered an offer for the bureau to leave the area and keep the cattle.

==== First Amendment zones ====
The Bureau of Land Management designated two First Amendment zones "for members of the public to express their First Amendment rights: Interstate 15 and Exit 112 for Riverside and State Route 170 and White Rock Road" with just one of the two First Amendment zones open at any one time at the daily discretion of the "Incident Command staff". A third area, Interstate 15 and Toquap Wash (between mile marker 114 and 115), was designated as a media area and "BLM/NPS credentialed media" could request tours by appointment inside the enclosure area to obtain b-roll video, no live feed and satellite trucks allowed.

==== Roundup yield ====
Government contractors using horses and a small helicopter succeeded in penning almost 400 trespass cattle from April 5 to 9, 2014. "According to state brand inspectors, almost 90 percent of the cattle rounded up by midweek bore Bundy's brand. Of the remaining animals, five belonged to a neighboring rancher, four were marked with brands that couldn't be read, and the rest were slicks, a ranching term for unmarked livestock." Six animals died, four of which were euthanized. One, a bull "posed a significant threat," while another ran into a fence, injuring its spine. The circumstances for the other two were not explained. A state brand inspector said the bull "might have got frightened, but that's no reason to shoot a bull." Another said that bulls sometimes charge at people, adding that it takes "a pretty good-size weapon" to kill Bundy's breed of bull.

After the roundup was suspended because of safety concerns, BLM spokesman Craig Leff said the agency would try to resolve the matter "administratively and judicially." Leff said: "The door isn't closed. We'll figure out how to move forward with this." He added: "The BLM and National Park Service did not cut any deal and negotiate anything."

== Confrontations and protests in April 2014 ==
In late March, Bundy sent letters entitled "Range War Emergency Notice and Demand for Protection" to county, state, and federal officials. In media interviews, Bundy used the language of the sovereign citizen movement as a rallying call, beckoning support from members of the Oath Keepers, the White Mountain Militia, and the Praetorian Guard.

At a March 27 meeting of the Bunkerville Town Advisory Board, Cliven Bundy's son, Ryan Bundy, spoke on state sovereignty and land-ownership matters: "This is an issue of state sovereignty ... These large tracts of land that Bureau of Land Management, Forest Service, monuments, parks and, you know, National Parks, et cetera, et cetera, there is no constitutionality to them at all." He also described his family's position:

If they are going to be out in the hills stealing our property, we will put measures of defense. And they have always asked us, "What will you do, what will you do?" and our stance has always been we will do whatever it takes. Open-ended. And because of that, that's why they are scared, because they don't know to what level we will go to protect, but we will protect.

In early April, armed people and private militia members from across the United States joined peaceful protesters against the trespass-cattle roundup in what has become known as the Battle of Bunkerville (evoking an association with the Battle of Bunker Hill). BLM enforcement agents were dispatched in response to what were seen as threatening statements by Bundy, such as calling the events a "range war."

With many roads closed to ensure safety during the cattle removal, controversial designated First Amendment zones where protesters could safely congregate or exercise their First Amendment right to peaceably assemble were marked with signs and orange plastic fences adjacent to the road. On April 8, 2014, Nevada Governor Brian Sandoval issued a statement calling for the removal of the First Amendment restrictions he described as offensive. After stating that peaceful protests had crossed into illegal activity, the federal agencies allowed protesters to go anywhere on the public land as long as they were peaceful.

=== April 10 confrontations and protests ===
On April 10, protesters blocked a BLM truck and demanded to know why a backhoe and dump truck were being used in the operation. The BLM's director in Nevada later said that the equipment was being used for field restoration. According to a statement from the BLM, the blocked truck "was struck by a protester on an ATV". Officers protecting the truck driver had Tasers and police dogs. The protesters angrily confronted the rangers. According to CNN, "Federal officials say a police dog was kicked and officers were assaulted. Bundy family members say they were thrown to the ground or jolted with a Taser."

=== April 12 confrontations and suspension of roundup ===
On the morning of April 12, an armed crowd rallied under a banner that read "Liberty Freedom For God We Stand." Most had signs, many of which chided "government thugs." Addressing the protesters, Bundy said, "We definitely don't recognize [the BLM director's] jurisdiction or authority, his arresting power or policing power in any way" and "We're about ready to take the country over with force!" After the BLM announced a suspension of the roundup, Bundy suggested blocking a highway. Armed protesters blocked a portion of Interstate 15 for more than two hours, causing traffic backups for three miles in both directions. Protesters also converged at the mouth of Gold Butte, the preserve where the cattle were corralled, and a tense, hour-long standoff ensued. BLM rangers warned over loudspeakers that they were prepared to use tear gas. Former Arizona Sheriff Richard Mack, who was with the protesters, said that they were "strategizing to put all the women up at the front. If they are going to start shooting, it's going to be women that are going to be televised all across the world getting shot by these rogue federal officers." Protesters with rifles took positions on a highway overpass, offering cover as horse-mounted wranglers led protesters to face off against BLM rangers and snipers. Utah Lt. Gov. Spencer Cox, who officially traveled to the Bundy standoff to convey that Utah did not want the cattle, put the number of federal agents present at over 200. According to Las Vegas assistant sheriff Joe Lombardo, there were 24 BLM rangers and Las Vegas deputy sheriffs present at the standoff. Las Vegas police were not allowed to wear protective gear because of fear that it would be seen as a provocation. Clark County Sheriff Gillespie blames the escalation of the situation on the BLM, stating to the Las Vegas Review-Journal that the BLM has lied to him about having a place to take the cattle and the BLM did not attend town-hall meetings and disregarded his advice as County Sheriff.

The Las Vegas Review-Journal reported that tensions reached a "critical level" during the standoff, "with rifles pointing toward each side." Las Vegas station KLAS-TV also reported that guns were pointed at officers. Assistant Sheriff Lombardo recounted that "they were in my face yelling profanities and pointing weapons," and said, "We were outgunned, outmanned, and there would not have been a good result from it."

A photojournalist for Reuters wrote that armed supporters had "taken up tactical positions on government officers," and that one man pointing a rifle in the direction of BLM employees said, "I've got a clear shot at four of them." Another man said, "I'm ready to pull the trigger if fired upon."

Las Vegas Metro Deputy Chief Tom Roberts defused the situation by announcing that Bundy's cattle would be returned within 30 minutes. The BLM announced that it would suspend the mass roundup, citing safety reasons. Clark County Sheriff Gillespie mediated the agreement between the Bundy family and the BLM, saying, "[W]hen a group of protesters threaten civil unrest or violence in this county -- it is my job to step in and ensure the safety of citizens." BLM Director Neil Kornze said that "Based on information about conditions on the ground, and in consultation with law enforcement, we have made a decision to conclude the cattle gather because of our serious concern about the safety of employees and members of the public."

BLM spokesman Craig Leff stated on April 14 in an email that "The gather is over" but that the agency planned to seek a solution "administratively and judicially" and intended to pursue court action to collect more than $1 million in back grazing fees owed by Bundy.

Las Vegas police stated that business owners in Mesquite had received threats because of the conflict. Militiamen were reportedly seen carrying rifles, keeping a round-the-clock security detail on Bundy, and setting up checkpoints.

=== Unmet demands to disarm federal agents and destroy entrance stations ===
After the BLM announced that it would release the gathered cattle, Bundy demanded that the county sheriff disarm the National Park Service "at Lake Mead and Red Rock park and all other parks where the federal government claims they have jurisdiction over." He requested that the arms be delivered within one hour. Bundy further demanded that county bulldozers or loaders be used to "tear down that entrance places where they ticket us and where they injure us and make us citizens pay their fees." The demands, which he described as a "mandate from we the people", were not met.

Bundy made similar statements two days later when he appeared on Glenn Beck's radio show and the Fox News program Hannity. He reiterated the demands on Sean Hannity's program: "The demand on the sheriff was de-arm the Park Service rangers, and de-arm Red Rock rangers — that's two parks very close to the Lake Mead area. And then the demand was, tear down the toll booth shacks." After expressing disappointment that the demands had not been met, he requested to "every county sheriff across the United States" that they "disarm the federal bureaucrats."

Bundy is reported to have described these demands as "a revelation that I received." According to Esquire, Bundy told a crowd, "The good Lord said, 'Bundy, it's not your job, it's their job.'...This morning, I said a prayer, and this is what I received. I heard a voice say, 'Sheriff Gillespie, your work is not done. Every sheriff across the United States, take the guns away from the United States bureaucrats."

== Events following April 2014 cattle gather ==
=== BLM attempts to communicate with Bundy ===
After the roundup was suspended, Cliven Bundy received several certified letters from the BLM that he refused to open. A BLM spokesperson said that the letters included notices that "provide Mr. Bundy the opportunity to buy back the gathered cattle." The spokesperson did not explain why the agency had sent Bundy notices regarding cattle that had been released to him.

=== Cliven Bundy statements and actions ===
Bundy alleged that the federal government wants to kill him for challenging its authority. During a press conference, he made controversial racial statements that were widely repudiated.

On May 2, 2014, Bundy and his family filed a complaint with the Las Vegas Metropolitan Police Department alleging crimes committed by federal agents, including illegally blocking roads, harassing photographers, using attack dogs, pointing weapons and threatening people.

During a June 3, 2014, radio program Cliven Bundy spoke with a small group of candidates for Clark County sheriff. He did not endorse any candidate, but he said that he did not want a peacemaker in that position. "You gonna be a peacemaker," said Bundy, "you're gonna be on the BLM's side."

=== Continued presence of Bundy supporters ===
At a "Patriot Party" after the standoff, supporters were treated to music from Ron Keel, a singer who worked with Black Sabbath for a short while in 1984.

In late April, Nevada Congressman Steven Horsford contacted Clark County sheriff Doug Gillespie regarding complaints from community members. The reported complaints alleged that Bundy militia supporters had established a persistent presence along roads, that they had set up checkpoints for citizens to prove residence, and that they had established an armed presence around churches, a school, and other community locations. One local resident said that neighbors on their way to an Easter Sunday church service were greeted by armed militia members, causing some of them not to enter "for fear and disgust of having their church basically held captive." According to the Associated Press, Cliven Bundy acknowledged "creating a stir", saying that there may have been weapons in the parking lot, but there were none in the church.

Las Vegas station KLAS-TV reported that armed protesters had blocked a county road and attempted to prevent a news crew from passing. The station also reported that "some poured lighter fluid around our news vehicle while others got physical." Bundy says that armed guards screen visitors at his ranch, but says that militia have not set up checkpoints on public property.

Mike Vanderboegh, a militia leader who remained in Nevada after the standoff, accused Senator Harry Reid of provoking a "civil war" and said not to "poke the wolverine with a sharp stick, Harry, unless you want your balls ripped off." Vanderboegh is the author of a novel that allegedly inspired a domestic terror plot and the leader of the Three Percenters Group, which the Anti-Defamation League characterizes as "part of an anti-government extremist movement."

Media outlets reported on conflict between different factions of Bundy supporters. A "wild, paranoid rumor" that Attorney General Eric Holder was preparing a drone strike against them caused Oath Keepers founder Stewart Rhodes to remove his men from the supposed "kill zone." In a recorded video, other Bundy supporters talked openly of shooting Rhodes for what they viewed as "desertion" and "cowardice." Rhodes later described one situation as "this close from being a gunfight." He recounted another situation in which he said a man drew a gun on a member of another militia.

Militia members have attempted to crowdfund their continued stay at the Bundy ranch. The site GoFundMe took down campaigns by Blaine Cooper and Christopher E. Ferrell. According to Nevada representative Steven Horsford, only about 15 armed militia remained as of early June 2014.

=== FBI and U.S. Capitol Police investigations ===
On May 8, Clark County sheriff's officials said that they were interviewed by the FBI as part of an investigation into armed Bundy supporters who confronted federal officers during the standoff. The investigation was confirmed by Clark County Sheriff Doug Gillespie, who stated "I've said all along there has to be accountability for what took place on April 12."

Joe Lombardo, who was in charge of police officers at the scene and who was interviewed on May 1, said the FBI agents were primarily interested in who was pointing weapons at federal agents, and that he expected the FBI to be poring over videotapes and photos taken during the standoff in order to identify people making threats.

After Senator Harry Reid criticized Bundy supporters, Politico reported that sources said the Senator had been the subject of threats and consequently had increased his security detail. A spokesman for the US Capitol Police, without commenting on the nature of any threats against Harry Reid, said, "We are currently looking into threatening statements made against Sen. Reid as part of an ongoing investigation."

=== 2014 Las Vegas shootings ===
Two people who were briefly at the ranch during the standoff were later involved in a shootout in Las Vegas. Cliven Bundy said that the couple, Jerad and Amanda Miller, had been asked to leave the ranch after a few days because they were "very radical" and did not align themselves with the protest's main issues. According to the Southern Poverty Law Center, Jerad and Amanda Miller were two of "perhaps hundreds of thousands" who saw the outcome of the Bundy standoff as "a huge victory against the federal government," which "may have pushed them over the edge." This shooting occurred on June 8, 2014, when Jerad and Amanda Miller killed two Las Vegas police officers and an armed civilian before Amanda Miller took her life. Jerad Miller was fatally wounded and died during a shootout with police. Interior Secretary Sally Jewell reacted to the shootings, saying, "It's very important to bring lawbreakers to justice. ... [Bundy] put our people in grave danger by calling in armed civilians from around the country, and that's not okay." Carol Bundy said, "I have not seen or heard anything from the militia and others who have came to our ranch that would, in any way, make me think they had an intent to kill or harm anyone."

=== 2016 Burns, Oregon standoff ===
In January 2016, armed men led by Ryan and Ammon Bundy seized control of the headquarters of the Malheur National Wildlife Refuge near Burns, Oregon. The occupation ended 40 days later on February 11, when the final occupier willingly went into custody. On February 10, 2016, Cliven Bundy posted to his Facebook page that he was on his way to the refuge, in part saying "Wake up patriots! Wake up militia! It's time!!!!" He was arrested a few hours later at Portland International Airport.

On December 1, 2019, an investigation commissioned by the Washington House of Representatives reported Washington state legislator, far-right activist Matt Shea had planned and participated in domestic terrorism, for his involvement with both the 2014 standoff in Nevada and the 2016 Malheur seizure. According to the report, Shea had led a delegation of right-wing legislators from Oregon, Washington and Idaho that met with law enforcement on January 9, 2016, in Burns, Oregon, where they were appraised of confidential intended law enforcement strategies for dealing with the refuge occupiers. Shea had then disclosed those details to the Bundys.

== Aftermath ==
=== Reactions by public officials ===
==== Senators ====
Republican Senator Dean Heller of Nevada said of the Bundy supporters, "These people are patriots." Heller made that statement during the same television interview in which Senator Harry Reid described the Bundy supporters as "domestic terrorists." Heller also complained of federal actions during the standoff, saying, "I told him [BLM Director Neil Kornze] very clearly that law-abiding Nevadans must not be penalized by an over-reaching BLM." After the resolution he stated, "emotions and tensions are still near the boiling point." Later on he said that Bundy should pay the BLM the more than $1 million in grazing fees owed to the agency.

After the BLM left the area for safety concerns, Nevada's senior US Senator and then Senate Majority Leader Harry Reid stated, "We can't have an American people that violate the law and then just walk away from it. So it's not over."

==== Congressional representatives ====
Republican Representative Chris Stewart (R-Utah) decried the BLM and other agencies for staffing their departments with what he called "paramilitary units" and "SWAT team[s]." However, the BLM does not have a SWAT team, according to The Salt Lake Tribune, which editorialized that Stewart's views "may be one of the worst ideas in the history of bad ideas." In response, a BLM agency's spokeswoman said that the BLM doesn't have any SWAT or tactical teams. An Interior Department representative said that the BLM "had law enforcement personnel present to provide safety for their employees and the public."

On April 19, 2014, Texas Republican Steve Stockman sent a letter to President Barack Obama, Department of the Interior Secretary Sally Jewell, and BLM Director Neil Kornze, stating that the BLM was overreaching its law enforcement authority with what he called a "paramilitary raid."

In a July 20, 2014, column in The Salt Lake Tribune and The Washington Post, then-Representative Steven Horsford (D-Nevada) described recent incidents of violence in his district and nearby states, and he criticized the "nonstop attention and demagoguery from media and politicians alike," saying: "There can be reasonable disagreements about the Bundy Ranch. But we can disagree without offering refuge to dangerous individuals on the fringe."

==== Nevada governor and state lawmakers ====
Nevada Governor Brian Sandoval sided with Bundy, saying, "No cow justifies the atmosphere of intimidation which currently exists nor the limitation of constitutional rights that are sacred to all Nevadans. The BLM needs to reconsider its approach to this matter and act accordingly."

Nevada Assemblywoman Michele Fiore, who supported Bundy, aiding him with his returned calves, said, "It's time for Nevada to stand up to the federal government and demand the return of the BLM lands to the people of Nevada."

==== Arizona lawmakers ====
On April 15, 2014, a group of Republican state legislators from Arizona, including Representatives Bob Thorpe (R-Flagstaff), David Livingston (R-Peoria), Kelly Townsend (R-Mesa), Senators Judy Burges (R-Sun City West), and Kelli Ward (R-Lake Havasu City) traveled to Mesquite, Nevada, to support Bundy in his standoff with the BLM. Arizona Representative Kelly Townsend said that the scenes at the ranch amid the dispute gave her a "visceral reaction ... It sounds dramatic, but it reminded me of Tiananmen Square. I don't recognize my country at this point." Her colleague, Bob Thorpe of Flagstaff, said that he was one of about three dozen state legislators who had sent a letter about the standoff to Nevada and federal officials. Congressman Paul Gosar also joined the group.

=== Reactions from media ===
Media personalities have weighed in on the confrontations. During the standoff, Bundy was interviewed (via remote link) by television host Sean Hannity. Hannity stated that some fear events could wind up mirroring the Waco siege and Ruby Ridge and said, "This is public land, and it's not being used, in my mind, and I'm not a rancher, (but) I would think the federal government might be thankful because you're cutting the lawn for free, and they're charging huge amounts of money, right, to let your cattle graze there with these fees." In contrast, a comparison of BLM grazing fees with private land market prices demonstrated the Bundy's are getting a 93% discount by grazing on BLM land.

Joy Reid and others mocked Cliven Bundy calling him a welfare cowboy as a derogatory term inspired by Welfare queen.

Editorial responses from newspapers have been mixed. The Las Vegas Review-Journal wrote that the BLM was right to defuse the situation, but that the confrontation showed the problems of federal land ownership in the state and called for the federal government to sell off the land in question. The Las Vegas Sun wrote that "Bundy hit a trifecta of sorts: He violated the laws Congress made, ignored the judicial branch's orders, and defied the executive branch's efforts to enforce those laws and orders ... In the end, Bundy isn't the victor; anarchy is. The rule of law, and society as a whole, lost." The Casper Star-Tribune wrote that Bundy was cheating taxpayers, an "embarrassment to ranchers in Wyoming and across the West who work hard, pay their taxes and maintain good relationships with managers of federal land on which their cattle graze."

In response to Bundy supporter Mike Vanderboegh's comment, "Don't poke the wolverine with a sharp stick, Harry [Reid], unless you want your balls ripped off", a writer for The Nation framed the remark as part of a larger, right-wing obsession with castration. Gawker lampooned militia crowdfunding attempts as a "welfare drive" to "sit around doing nothing."

=== Reactions by Bundy and supporters ===
About 1,500 Bundy supporters attended a celebration on April 18, where they ate Bundy beef, read cowboy poetry, and wore "domestic terrorist" name tags, referencing a comment made by Nevada Senator Harry Reid. Bundy said he would continue holding a daily news conference.

Some protesters termed the standoff as the Battle of Bunkerville, although there was actually no battle.

Some Tea Party Movement supporters expressed solidarity with the Bundys, including three Southern Nevada Tea Party groups that organized a protest outside Las Vegas police headquarters on April 11, 2014, claiming that Sheriff Doug Gillespie had failed in his duty to protect Nevadans from abuse by the federal government.

The Bundy family claimed victory on having its cattle returned. In an interview after the BLM's withdrawal, Sean Hannity asked Bundy if he had a reply to Senator Harry Reid's comment that the situation was not over. Bundy said, "I don't have a response for Harry Reid, but I have a response for every county sheriff across the United States. Disarm the federal bureaucrats."

An Oklahoma militia with members present in Nevada stated their support for Cliven Bundy. During an appearance on The O'Reilly Factor, host Bill O'Reilly asked Scott Shaw, a co-founder of the Oklahoma Volunteer Militia, what made Cliven Bundy different from Occupy Wall Street supporters. Shaw replied that Cliven Bundy is "providing the country with beef" and that the two groups have different methods of dissent.

In Texas, Michael Joseph Kearns, a convicted felon with alleged ties to the sovereign citizen movement who describes himself as a "self-taught paralegal", filed a motion seeking to overturn a 2013 ruling allowing the BLM to seize Bundy's cattle. After the judge ruled that Kearns had no standing, Kearns filed another motion. He wrote that the judge's "orders, judgments and mandates, have no rightful or lawful force and effect upon the people of the United States." Describing Kearns as an "abusive filer", the judge directed the federal clerk to return, "without docketing," any future documents Kearns tries to file. Kearns, who has denied that he is part of the sovereign citizen movement, was convicted in 1996 of one count conspiracy to defraud the United States and seven counts of aiding and abetting mail fraud. Kearns was released from federal prison on May 3, 2006.

During an interview with a journalist following the standoff, Bundy cited Article 1, Section 8, Clause 17 of the Constitution to assert the federal government is limited to owning ten square miles of land, though the clause actually limits the District of Columbia to "ten Miles square."

=== Commentator reactions on legality and rule of law ===
The Atlantic reporter Matt Ford pointed out that Bundy's claim, "I abide by all of Nevada state laws. But I don't recognize the United States government as even existing," is at odds with Nevada's law, specifically the state's constitution. Framed during the Civil War, Nevada's constitution specifically mentions the rights of the federal government, stating in Article 1, Section 2:

The Paramount Allegiance of every citizen is due to the Federal Government in the exercise of all its Constitutional powers as the same have been or may be defined by the Supreme Court of the United States ... whensoever any portion of the States, or people thereof attempt to secede from the Federal Union, or forcibly resist the Execution of its laws, the Federal Government may, by warrant of the Constitution, employ armed force in compelling obedience to its Authority."

An editorial published in The Salt Lake City Tribune on April 15, 2014, stated, "Don't let him get away with it" and "The only winner in this was a scofflaw who has twice lost in the courts for running cattle where they don't belong and skipping out on grazing fees. Some 20,000 ranchers in Western states abide by BLM regulations, so what makes Bundy special?" In summary, it concluded, "When some manage to avoid justice by extralegal means, the rule of law is weakened for all Americans."

Dallas Hyland, in his column in Utah's St. George News, wrote, "The stand-down was necessary to prevent bloodshed, but it must be recognized that if Bundy and a multitude of his supporters, militia friends, and even family members who broke the law, are allowed to go unpunished, anarchy will follow. In the case of Bundy and the Gold Butte designations, the government did it right. They continued to do it right in the face of the lawless behavior of a rancher and his militia henchmen."

=== Reactions related to American Indian history ===
Indian Country Today Media Network wrote that government treatment of Cliven Bundy "stands in stark contrast to what was done to the Dann Sisters and other Indigenous Peoples on Shoshone territory" and that "United Nations Committee on the Elimination of Racial Discrimination found "credible information alleging that the Western Shoshone indigenous people are being denied their traditional rights to land." An editorial in the Las Vegas Review-Journal also contrasted Bundy's dispute with that of the Dann Sisters.

The Las Vegas news at KLAS-TV reported that the Moapa Band of Paiute Indians had provided them with a map indicating that a federal treaty had promised them the land on which the Bundy ranch is situated."

=== Political commentary reactions ===
David Damore, a political science professor at the University of Nevada, Las Vegas, said that there is "a great ability on the part of these folks to overlook the reality of how much the federal government subsidized Nevada in terms of big projects – the Hoover Dam, the mining subsidies. It's a welfare cowboy mindset."

Elaine Hurd, a resident of nearby Mesquite Nevada, told local television station KLAS "I feel that the rule of law supersedes armed militias coming in from all over the country to stand with a law-breaking rancher, which is what he is."

Brad Knickerbocker of the Christian Science Monitor saw the events as echoing the Sagebrush Rebellion, a 1970s movement to transfer control of public domain lands to the states.

=== Environmentalist reactions ===
The nonprofit Center for Biological Diversity stated, "Despite having no legal right to do so, cattle from Bundy's ranch have continued to graze throughout the Gold Butte area, competing with tortoises for food, hindering the ability of plants to recover from extensive wildfires, trampling rare plants, damaging ancient American Indian cultural sites and threatening the safety of recreationists."

Rob Mrowka, also with the Center for Biological Diversity, said that the BLM "is allowing a freeloading rancher and armed thugs to seize hundreds of thousands of acres of the people's land as their own. It's backing down in the face of threats and posturing of armed sovereignists."

Environmentalists held that the BLM's withdrawal sent the wrong message to law-abiding ranchers who do secure grazing permits and operate within the law.

=== Aftermath from Bureau of Land Management ===
Twenty months after the incident, Bundy had not paid the fees and continued to graze cattle on Federal land. A spokesperson for the Bureau of Land Management wrote in response to a reporter's inquiry: "Our primary goal remains to resolve this matter safely and according to the rule of the law." The response added "The Bureau of Land Management remains resolute in addressing issues involved in efforts to gather Mr. Bundy's cattle and we are pursuing the matter through the legal system." The BLM spokesperson also said "The Department of Justice has the lead on any investigation of federal crimes that may have been committed." The US Attorney's Office in Las Vegas would neither confirm or deny that there was a criminal investigation.

Roger Taylor, a retired BLM district manager in Arizona, said the agency's decision to release the cattle would have repercussions. "The (agency) is going to be in a worse situation where they will have a much more difficult time getting those cattle off the land and getting Bundy in compliance with regulations," he said.

== 2016 standoff ==
On February 10, 2016, Cliven Bundy traveled to Portland, Oregon, in response to federal law enforcement moving to end a standoff led by his sons Ammon and Ryan at the Malheur National Wildlife Refuge. He was arrested at the airport by the FBI and was incarcerated at the Multnomah County Jail. He was indicted for 16 federal felonies on February 17, along with Ammon and Ryan Bundy, militia leader Ryan Payne, and broadcaster Peter Santilli, who were already under arrest for their role in the Malheur standoff. Another 14 individuals were charged on March 3, 2016. Santilli subsequently pled guilty to felony conspiracy to injure or impede a federal officer.

On January 8, 2018, U.S. District Judge Gloria Navarro in Las Vegas dismissed with prejudice the criminal charges against Cliven Bundy, his sons Ammon and Ryan, and co-defendant Ryan Payne regarding the standoff.

== Prosecutions of some standoff participants ==
The first criminal case resulting from the standoff, against six Bundy supporters, was declared a mistrial by U.S. District Judge Gloria Navarro on April 24, 2017. Six men had been charged with conspiring with Cliven Bundy to prevent a court-ordered cattle seizure. The mistrial was declared hours after the jury convicted two men of some of the 10 counts in the indictment. The jurors reported to the court they were "hopelessly deadlocked" on the remaining counts and defendants, despite the judge having sent them back to deliberate further but they were unable to reach any unanimous verdicts for four defendants, described by prosecutors as the "least culpable" of the 17 who were charged, and on the remaining counts for the two who were convicted. Over 50 prosecution witnesses testified in the two-month trial. Former militia group member, Gregory Burleson, of Arizona, who has also been a paid FBI informant, was convicted of assault upon and threatening of a federal officer, aiding extortion via both interstate commerce and travel, obstruction of justice, plus multiple gun counts. He faces a 57-year mandatory minimum sentence. Idaho activist Todd Engel was found guilty of obstruction of justice and interstate travel in aid of extortion. Representing himself at trial, he may be sentenced to as much as 30 years in federal prison on the first two charges. At his July 26 sentencing, Burleson was given 68 years for recruiting others in Arizona to join the standoff, and posting "alcohol fueled' rants encouraging others to do the same. Engel was to be sentenced on the following day with Cliven, Ammon and Ryan Bundy and two others expected to be tried later in 2017. Retrials of the first six and the trials of the remaining eleven defendants were originally scheduled for June 26th by Judge Navarro.

The retrial for the four defendants for whom no verdict was reached in April began on July 11, 2017, in Las Vegas. The Jury began deliberations on August 15, 2017. On August 22nd, they found two of the defendants not guilty on all charges and cleared the other two of most charges, but they could not reach verdicts on four charges against Eric Parker and two charges against Scott Drexler.

The first defendant to be sentenced is Gerald "Jerry" DeLemus of Rochester, New Hampshire, who tried to change his guilty plea to "not guilty." He received a little more than seven years from Judge Navarro, for conspiracy and interstate travel in aid of extortion, with credit for the 16 months he has already served.

A verdict of not guilty was returned on two defendants August 22, 2017, by the jury after 3 days of deliberation. Two others were found not guilty of several of the charges and unable to come to a decision on other charges. Ricky Lovelien and Steven Stewart were acquitted of all 10 charges and ordered released. There were not-guilty findings on most charges against Scott Drexler and Eric Parker. On August 23, 2017, the court scheduled a retrial for September 25, 2017, on both Drexler and Parker and ordered them released to return to Idaho, pending retrial. On August 31, 2017, the court scheduled a trial date for October 10, 2017, for Cliven Bundy, Ammon Bundy, Ryan Bundy, Ryan Payne and Peter Santilli. Included with this group will be the retrial of Scott Drexler and Eric Parker. On October 6, 2017, the court rescheduled to October 30, 2017, the trial for 6 of the 7 defendants. Peter Santilli pled guilty to conspiracy to injure or impede federal officers by blocking BLM law enforcement officers in with his car, and was released pending sentencing in January 2018. On October 23, 2017, Scott Drexler and Eric Parker each pled guilty to a single count of obstruction of a court order, a misdemeanor charge. Both men will be sentenced on February 2, 2018. On November 14, 2017, Micah McGuire pled guilty to a single charge of conspiracy to impede federal officers, and was released pending sentencing on February 14, 2018

During a sealed court hearing on November 29, 2017, judge Gloria M. Navarro considered multiple defense motions seeking dismissal of the case due to alleged withholding of exculpatory evidence by the federal government. After the sealed hearing, judge Navarro granted pretrial release to Cliven Bundy, his son Ammon Bundy, and co-defendant Ryan Payne.

On December 4, 2017, U.S. Magistrate Judge Peggy Leen ordered the pretrial release of the remaining defendants.

On December 20, 2017, Judge Navarro declared a mistrial, stating that federal prosecutors had willfully violated evidence rules and failed to turn over pertinent documents to the defense. Both sides were instructed to submit legal briefs by December 29 on whether the government should be allowed to pursue a new trial with a hearing to be held on January 8, 2018. A new tentative trial date was set for February 26, 2018.

On December 21, 2017, United States Attorney General Jeff Sessions ordered an examination into the federal prosecution's mishandling of the Bundy case.

On January 8, 2018, U.S. District Court Judge Gloria Navarro dismissed with prejudice the criminal charges against Cliven Bundy, his sons Ammon and Ryan, and co-defendant Ryan Payne regarding the standoff. At that time she also scheduled a February 26, 2018, trial date for "Tier 3" defendants Melvin Bundy, Dave Bundy, Jason Woods and Joseph O'Shaughnessy. On February 7, 2018, the federal government moved to dismiss with prejudice the indictments against the remaining defendants "in the interests of justice." On July 19, 2018, Todd Engel was sentenced to 14 years in federal prison after being convicted on charges of obstruction of justice and interstate travel in aid of extortion. On August 9, 2018, Scott Drexler was sentenced to time served while Eric Parker received one year of supervised release. On September 11, 2018, Pete Santilli was sentenced to time served plus two years of supervised release. On September 27, 2018, Blaine Cooper was sentenced to 20 months already spent in custody and faces a combined three years of supervised release. On January 15, 2019, Brian Cavalier was sentenced to the 20 months he already served in custody.

On May 29, 2020, the Justice Department began motions to start a retrial of the Bundys and others. On August 6, 2020, the United States Court of Appeals for the Ninth Circuit upheld the decision to dismiss felony conspiracy and weapon charges against Cliven, Ammon and Ryan Bundy along with Ryan Payne. The court also vacated the 2018 conviction of Todd Engel and ordered a new trial.

=== United States Appeal to the US 9th Circuit Court of Appeals ===
On August 6, 2020, the 9th United States Circuit Court of Appeals in San Francisco denied an appeal by United States prosecutors to reinstate the criminal prosecution of the Bundys related to the 2014 armed standoff in Nevada and the 2016 armed protest and occupation of the Malheur National Wildlife Refuge in Oregon. The appeals court ruled that the dismissal of the case against the Bundys due to the prosecution withholding documents and other materials requested by the defense attorneys was proper and supported by the record of the case. The appeals court stopped short of affirming that prosecutorial misconduct had occurred and stated that "misjudgments" by prosecutors did not rise to professional misconduct in the case.

== Federal lawsuits ==
On August 9, 2018, Rick Lovelien and Steven Stewart filed a $60 million lawsuit in United States district court in Washington, D.C. Named as defendants are Las Vegas prosecutors Steven Myhre, Daniel Schiess and Nadia Ahmed along with former FBI Director James Comey, former Director of the BLM Neil Kornze and the agencies of the FBI and BLM. On October 31, 2018, Ryan Bundy filed a federal civil rights lawsuit in US district court in Washington, DC. Named as defendants are the former Attorney General Jeff Sessions, former Attorney Generals Eric Holder and Loretta Lynch, former FBI Director James Comey and former BLM Director Neil Kornze.

== See also ==
- Militia organizations in the United States
- Recapture Canyon
- Sagebrush Rebellion
- Tenther movement
- Food sovereignty (United States)
