= Keiter =

Keiter is a surname. Notable people with the surname include:

- Hans Keiter (1910–2005), German handball player
- Les Keiter (1919–2009), American sports announcer
- Robert Keiter (born 1946), American lawyer

== See also ==
- Keiter Mound, a Native American mound in Ohio, United States
