= Kelly Townsend =

American politician (born 1968)

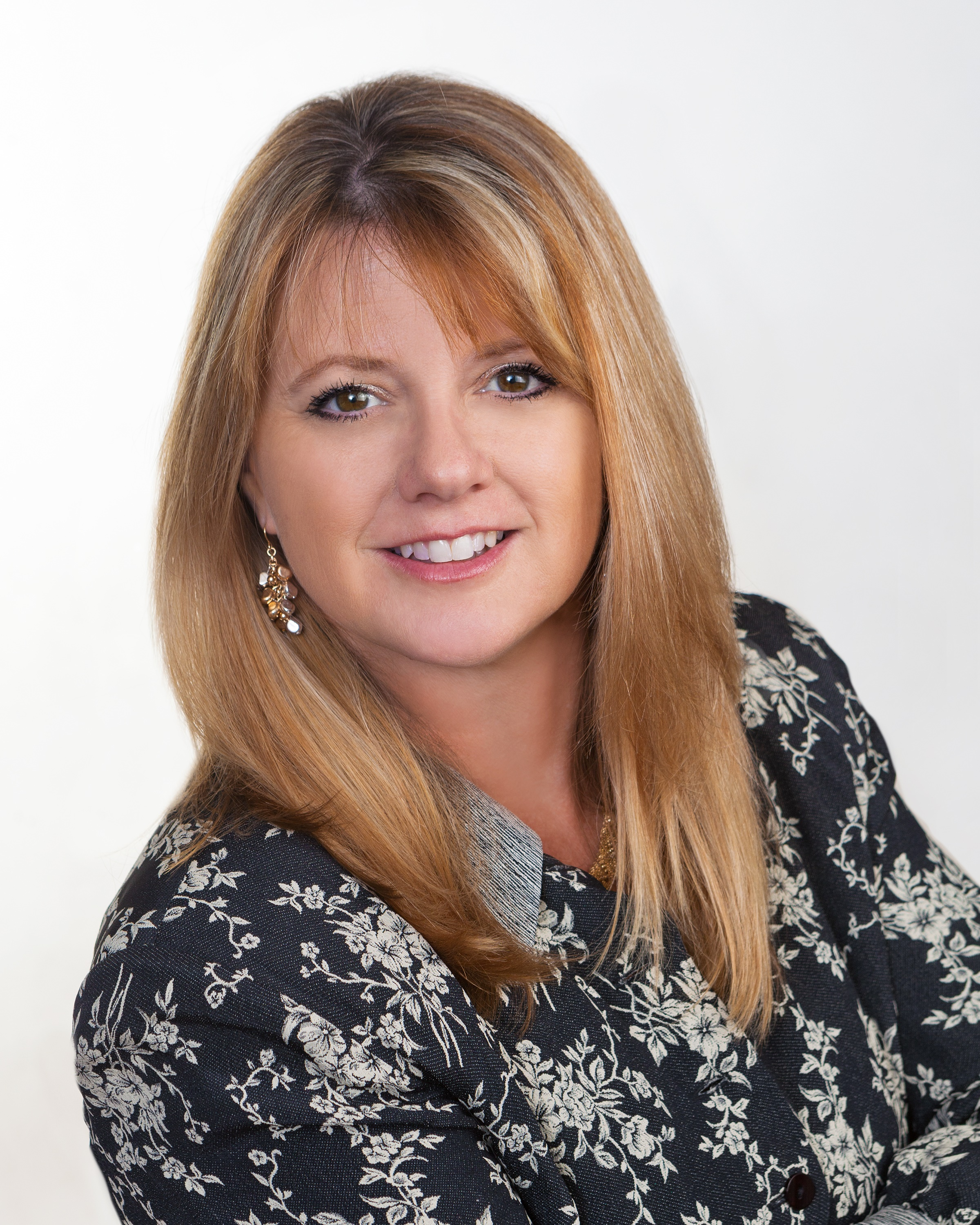
- Townsend in 2014

Member of the Arizona Senate from the 16th district
- In office January 11, 2021 – January 9, 2023
- Preceded by: Dave Farnsworth
- Succeeded by: T. J. Shope

Member of the Arizona House of Representatives from the 16th district
- In office January 14, 2013 – January 11, 2021
- Preceded by: redistricted
- Succeeded by: Jacqueline Parker

Personal details
- Born: September 27, 1968 (age 58) United States
- Party: Republican
- Education: Southern Oregon University (BS)
- Website: www.kellytownsend.com

Kelly Townsend (born September 27, 1968) is an American author, childbirth educator, birth doula, and former Republican politician. She was a member of the Arizona Senate representing District 16 from 2021 to 2023, and previously was a member of the Arizona House of Representatives from 2013 to 2021, acting as Majority Whip from 2017 to 2018.

== Early life and education ==
Townsend grew up in Oregon and served in the United States Navy as an aircraft mechanic from 1988 to 1992, stationed at Point Mugu, California. She received a Bachelor of Science degree in psychology and small business from Arizona State University.

== Career ==
Townsend was trained as a birth doula in 1992 and a childbirth educator in 1993. She is the author of Christ Centered Childbirth, a guide to help young parents draw upon their faith to help bring their child into the world. The book has been published in the United States, in Croatia under the title Duhovni pristup rađanju and in Slovenia under the title, Skozi nosečnost z Jezusom.

== Political career and electoral history ==
According to the official Congressional Record and other news reporting, in late 2009, Townsend co-founded the Greater Phoenix Tea Party with a man named Les White. She first ran for the Arizona House of Representatives in a six-way Republican primary in District 22, placing fourth with 5,446 votes. The next year she campaigned for legislation requiring proof of citizenship as a prerequisite for ballot access. The legislation was passed by the Arizona State Legislature but vetoed by Governor Jan Brewer. In 2012 she was one of four candidates in District 16 for the Republican House of Representatives primary, placing first with 9,298 votes. She won the second seat with 40,720 votes in the five-way general election against Democratic nominee Matthew Cerra, Arizona Green Party candidate Bill Maher, and Democratic write-in candidate Cara Prior. Townsend identified as the Founder of the Greater Phoenix Tea Party in her Arizona Capitol Times questionnaire when she first ran for her seat in 2012.

Townsend has been a longstanding member of the Oath Keepers. In 2014, she joined a caravan of fellow lawmakers to Bundy Ranch and held a press conference condemning Federal overreach while attending the standoff between the FBI and Cliven Bundy in a fight over land rights, However, while she supported the group at the Bundy Ranch protest, Townsend condemned the Bundy sons' occupation of the Oregon building by protesters that resulted in the death of LaVoy Finicum, which Townsend described as suicide by cop "just as he wanted," claiming that "discredited our cause," then linked to a video posted online by a relative of Finicum who said she was present at the scene when he was shot by FBI agents.

In June 2020, Townsend posted a QAnon video with a flaming "Q" to her social media and followed high-profile QAnon accounts.

=== Election activism ===
In 2010, Townsend attended a presentation at which Russian-born attorney Orly Taitz spoke about "rigged" voting machines and voter fraud, as well as her doubts about Obama's eligibility for the presidency, and Townsend discussed the Asch conformity experiments in the context of Obama birther theories.

In February 2019, Townsend introduced legislation that would have made it a criminal offense for individuals to be paid to register voters unless employed by a recognized political party. Following criticism, Townsend announced plans to amend the bill, and it did not advance in its original form. Critics raised concerns that the measure could suppress voter turnout, while supporters, including Townsend, said it was aimed at preventing fraud. The bill passed out of committee but faced significant opposition. A revised version was proposed amid widespread criticism—grassroots groups and legislators flagged concerns over its impact on democratic participation calling it an "anti-democracy" bill. Ultimately, HB 2616 failed to pass the House Floor, falling short in a 32–28 vote.

In April 2019, a video of Townsend's visit to the Mexico-United States border was posted by right-wing group, AZ Patriot. In the video, Townsend said her main concern was that migrants arriving were registering to vote in federal elections.

The day after Trump attorney Rudy Giuliani presented allegations of election fraud, Townsend requested the Attorney General's office election integrity unit investigate all allegations presented by Giuliani.

In February 2020, Townsend sponsored a bill which she said would combat voter fraud. Opponents claimed that the bill would, among other things, restrict anyone from voting with the assistance of a translator unless the person had a disability. During a hearing before the House Elections Committee, Townsend removed the leader of an activist group from the hearing and shut down public commentary. The same month, Townsend proposed legislation for a voter fraud hotline predicting possible foreign interference or meddling in the then upcoming 2020 election. Her bill also expanded law enforcement powers allowing law enforcement or agents of the Attorney General's office election integrity unit to enter a polling place during the vote count to investigate voter fraud.

Following the 2020 election, Townsend was a vocal supporter of election fraud theories, speaking at "Stop the Steal" movement rallies, advocating the independent state legislature theory and petitioning the United States Congress to accept 11 "alternate" presidential electors pledged to vote for Donald Trump or to nullify Arizona's electoral votes pending an audit.

Townsend led her supporters in criticism of House Speaker Rusty Bowers for his refusal to allow her and her colleagues to call a formal legislative session to recall the State's electors. Townsend wanted a hearing to exercise her subpoena power as House Elections Chair to access voting machines.

On November 4, 2020, after a video was published of a woman claiming her vote was not counted due to the voting center requiring the use of Sharpies, Townsend took to her social media asking others with Sharpie experiences to come forward. After the Trump team's Sharpie lawsuit was dismissed as meritless, Townsend introduced legislation to restrict the use of Sharpie brand markers to mark ballots.

In December 2020, Townsend reportedly expressed concern to Giuliani that unless they had a pending legal case, their attempts to promote the alternate elector scheme might appear treasonous. Townsend proposed legislation to establish criminal penalties for election workers who misplace ballots, and contractors that fail to meet the terms of the contract. She also made public demands for law enforcement investigations of election workers, including for simple mistakes. She supported legislation that would require voters in Arizona who vote by mail to include identification paperwork along with their ballots. Maricopa County Republican Party chair, Rae Chornenky, resigned December 10, after coming under fire from Townsend for failing to attend the county's logic & accuracy test session of election equipment, and alleging her inaction “contributed to the collapse of Arizona voter confidence.”

The day before the attack on the U.S. Capitol, Townsend sponsored a bill to recall Arizona's electors that had been allocated to Biden and replace them with Trump electors.

After the Capitol was breached, Townsend publicly alleged the rioters learned their behavior from the left, who were the real culprits. Adding, to her now deleted tweet "[a] year of violence from the Left. Heck, maybe it is the Left in disguise..." On January 7, 2021, in a since deleted tweet, Townsend blamed Arizona Governor Doug Ducey for the attack on the U.S. Capitol alleging he refused to bring the legislature into session along with House Speaker Rusty Bowers to conduct a full forensic audit.

Two months following her defeat of the election reform packages, Townsend leveraged her power with her budget vote to stall finalizing a budget as part of an effort to pressure GOP colleagues into creating a special legislative panel to review the results of the audit being conducted by the Senate of the 2020 election results in Maricopa County that she had championed. The following month, Townsend threatened the Maricopa County Board of Supervisors in a video interview with Jordan Conradson from the Gateway Pundit, that it was their "come to Jesus moment," and that if they did not come forward to work with her and her associates on election integrity issues, they could be indicted or recalled.

In February 2022, Townsend proposed legislation requiring monthly reviews of the electoral roll and the prompt removal of felons from them, as well as prohibition of same-day voter registrations. Also in February 2022, Townsend said as part of a failed attempt to ban voting machines, that a return to the voting practices of "our parents" would improve the system. In March 2022 she issued a subpoena to Maricopa County to produce election data previously subpoenaed by the Arizona Attorney General.

In March 2022, Townsend issued additional subpoenas to the Maricopa County Board of Supervisors and publicly accused them of obstruction due to their non-compliance. In May 2022, after a Senate presentation by True the Vote, Townsend called on supporters to monitor ballot drop boxes used for early voting in the 2022 elections for indications of electoral fraud. In June 2022, Townsend received an FBI subpoena for emails and text messages relating to the Arizona Senate's examination of electoral fraud issues.

In July 2022, Townsend told the Washington Post in an interview that she had one or two phone calls with Giuliani in December 2020 but no longer has the phone on which those calls were made. She said she has described the nature of the calls to the FBI.

On August 4, 2022, Townsend led a group that protested the election at the Pinal County Supervisors meeting criticizing Pinal County Attorney Kent Volkmer for his stance and threatening to go to court to stop the County from certifying the results of the 2022 primary election. It was found that multiple polling locations did not have enough ballots ready for voters, and that many left the polling station without voting. At the meeting, Townsend told the Board of Supervisors they needed to halt certification and re-run the 2022 primary election citing continued claims of election malfeasance and chain of custody issues. Alternatively, the board opted to fire and replace the Pinal County elections director with Geraldine Roll, who resigned in June 2023 alleging she was not protected from political attacks led by Townsend and her associates.

Townsend filed a lawsuit for an injunction to halt the Pinal County ballot count which was denied on August 12, 2022. In November 2022, Townsend issued a subpoena for midterm election administration records in Maricopa County which the County rejected.

=== Opposition toward Rusty Bowers ===
In 2019, Townsend recognized the effect of inciting a crowd toward a fellow lawmaker, "When someone of authority incites mental warfare or otherwise, those out in the community who may or may not be stable will take that to heart and do it, and maybe take it to another level," she said."

Beginning in November 2020, Townsend actively called for the removal of Rusty Bowers from office after he refused to bring the legislature into session to vote to send Trump electors to Congress for the 2020 election. In December 2020, Townsend tweeted the home address and phone number of Rusty Bowers, which prompted her support groups to protest outside his home. The tweet was later deleted. Townsend stated she had a donor willing to pay $500K to support the recall. America Restored, a group Townsend is closely allied with, funded the attempted recall. When the recall effort failed, Townsend solicited David Farnsworth, with whom she had worked with on DCS and child sex trafficking issues, to run against Bowers in the 2022 midterms, reporting that she could not stand serving with Bowers any further.

On December 4, 2020, when Townsend insisted the State send alternate electors as part of a bid to overturn the election, Bowers rejected such a proposal. Townsend alleged Bowers did not understand constitutional law, and was quoted as tweeting, "It is imperative that Arizona's legislators use our Article 2 power and choose the electors after everything we have seen here," Townsend wrote on Twitter in the afternoon. "I do not want to go down in history as doing nothing about it."

=== Ballot drop box monitoring and voter intimidation allegations ===
Townsend drew national attention in 2022 for her comments encouraging citizens to monitor outdoor ballot drop-boxes, which led to allegations of voter intimidation and subsequent federal court challenges.

In May 2022, following a presentation by the election denial group True the Vote, Townsend encouraged citizens to stake out ballot drop-boxes. Speaking at a legislative hearing, she stated, "I have been so pleased to hear of all of you vigilantes out there that want to camp out at these drop boxes, right? So do it."

Her remarks prompted concerns of potential voter intimidation. Election officials reported voters being photographed, filmed, and in some cases followed by vehicles after depositing ballots. At least six complaints of possible voter intimidation around drop-boxes were referred to law enforcement by Arizona Secretary of State Katie Hobbs.

A federal lawsuit was filed in October 2022 seeking to block such monitoring. U.S. District Judge Michael Liburdi declined to issue an injunction, ruling that the activity did not meet the legal threshold for voter intimidation and was protected by the First Amendment. Days later, however, the same court issued a temporary restraining order in a related case, barring members of Clean Elections USA and associated groups from photographing, filming, or following voters within 75 feet of a ballot drop-box or its entrance.

=== Child welfare system activism and judicial conflict ===
In 2015, Townsend led a group of parents aggrieved by the child welfare system which they allege wrongfully removed their children from the home. In 2017, Townsend sponsored a bill to prohibit child welfare workers from lying in hearings or withholding exculpatory evidence. Townsend spoke out defending anti-vax parents whose child with a fever was removed based on allegations of medical neglect.

In 2019, Judge Timothy Ryan ordered Townsend removed from his court as she publicly criticized the Court's decision regarding a child welfare case and rules surrounding the confidentiality of CPS hearings designed to protect the child. While challenging the Judge's decision to remove her, Townsend insisted Judge Ryan put in writing why he was ordering her removal from his courtroom and he informed her he would note it in the record. After being removed for violating the courts order not to discuss confidential hearings with the press, Townsend spoke out publicly against Judge Ryan, accusing him publicly of targeting her.

=== School related activism ===
In 2018, Townsend supported protesters at a rally outside a school for a student who stated he was bullied for wearing Trump attire. The following year, she sponsored legislation to stop what she described as potential political influence efforts in the classroom.

In early 2022, she sponsored a bill defunding the Arizona School Boards Association, alleging the association engages in partisan lobbying and did not renounce its National Association when it took sides in political debate.

In December 2018, Townsend introduced House Bill 2017, which sought to prohibit district and charter schools from closing on regularly scheduled instructional days except during pre-approved breaks, holidays, or specific emergencies, and to expand restrictions on the use of school resources to coordinate closures. She described the proposal as a response to the previous spring's Red for Ed walkouts.

The introduced text of HB 2017 authorized civil penalties and allowed actions to be brought in superior court by the attorney general, county attorneys, or private parties. It also amended Arizona Revised Statutes § 15-511 concerning political activities by school personnel. Local outlets covered the measure as an effort to curb future teacher walkouts, and broadcast reports highlighted that HB 2017 aimed to limit school closures in the wake of Red for Ed.

Related proposals by Townsend in the 2019 session to restrict political activity by teachers drew renewed attention later in the spring; coverage noted possible fines and discussed revisions shifting penalties from individual educators to school districts. HB 2017 was pre-filed on December 21, 2018, introduced on April 25, 2019, and assigned to the House Rules Committee; no further action is recorded and the bill did not become law.

=== Citizen alleged retaliation for social media criticism ===
Citizen Patrick Mannion reported to the Arizona Attorney General that when he criticized Townsend on social media, she contacted his employer and attempted to get him fired.

=== ALEC and Article V Convention activism ===
Townsend served as a chairperson for ALEC's Article V agenda and has been a staunch supporter of holding a constitutional convention to amend the constitution to mandate a balanced budget amendment. In June 2021, Townsend withheld her vote as a "holdout" approving then Governor Ducey's budget to leverage her fellow legislators to organize a national Convention of States and sought to pass a so-called "skinny budget," with enough funding to keep the government running past the end of the fiscal year on June 30, while remaining in the legislative session long enough to complete the audit that at the time was being carried out by the Cyber Ninjas owned by Doug Logan, who like Townsend, had a history of promoting QAnon content on social media.

=== COVID-19 ===
Townsend opposed mask mandates and vowed not to wear a mask while working at the Arizona Capitol. Townsend also opposed mask use in schools and led anti-mask protests at school board meetings.

Townsend and Trickovic led an organized effort in opposition to the COVID-19 lockdown orders issued by Arizona Governor Ducey.

=== Ivermectin Controversy ===
When Governor Ducey sought to implement restrictions surrounding the use of Ivermectin as an off label COVID treatment and some pharmacies were refusing to fill prescriptions, departing from legislative precedent, Townsend sought to pass a bill requiring pharmacists to dispense Ivermectin prescriptions regardless of their professional judgment.

=== Arizona House of Representatives ===
In 2014, Townsend along with fellow Arizona lawmakers attended the Bundy standoff. Townsend characterized the Federal government's response as reminiscent of Tiananmen Square. She subsequently won both the Republican Party primary and the general election, both with 39 percent of the vote.

In 2018 Townsend criticized semi-nude female women's rights activists, abortion and the "culture of death", the Arizona child welfare system, the furry community and opposed increased funding for education. That year she won the general election with 35.72 percent of the vote.

In 2019 she compared mandatory vaccination to Communism and the Holocaust, supported high school students who alleged they had been prevented from wearing "Make America Great Again" clothing and was accused of retaliation by a Facebook user who posted content critical of her.

Also in 2019, Townsend was caught on a hot mic in a closed GOP caucus meeting suggesting using "leverage" of a "Chairman's revolt" refusing to allow any of their bills to be heard in committee's to penalize fellow legislators Paul Boyer and Heather Carter for their refusal to concede a budget vote. Boyer responded this was junior high behavior and only hurt his constituents.

=== Arizona Senate ===
During her Senate tenure Townsend renewed her criticism of COVID-19 vaccines, comparing public service announcements on state highways to Communist Chinese propaganda and comparing those that complain about the unvaccinated to Nazis. She supported parents protesting against local school boards, arguing that the National School Board Association and Federal Bureau of Investigation were attacking parents' rights. In 2022 she sponsored bills that would prohibit school districts from using tax dollars to pay their School Board Association membership dues and that would allow parents to use criminal and civil process for a teacher's violation of a parent's right to direct the education of his or her child. Townsend also supported legislation that would prohibit the teaching of critical race theory in schools. According to the Institute for Research and Education on Human Rights she participates in social media groups that identify with sovereign citizen ideology as well as other far-right ideologies.

=== Antisemitism controversy ===
The Anti-Defamation League urged Townsend to retract a post of a Nazi symbol she posted to social media as a political statement regarding mask use.

=== Public comment on Trump and Stormy Daniels controversy ===
Townsend, who introduced current President Donald Trump to Arizona politics before he ran for office, faced a recall effort by a local resident after she defended Trump as the allegations that Trump had an affair with porn star Stormy Daniels became public, saying, "women who are acting in 'moral defiance' have 'no defense' if they are sexually harassed or raped."

=== McCain history and Agenda 21 ===
Townsend is an anti-Agenda 21 activist who demanded an apology from former Congressman John McCain after he called Tea Partiers and anti-agenda 21 activists "hobbits."

=== Patriot Party Movement of Arizona ===
By 2018, Townsend's activism with the Arizona Tea Party later merged into collaboration with the Patriot Movement of Arizona in which Townsend led and promoted the group speaking at protests, events, and rallies, while encouraging members to stand up and fight for their rights and Country.

=== Anti abortion activism ===
In 2005, Townsend wrote a book Christ Centered Childbirth, and has been a longstanding anti-abortion activist.

In 2009, three years before taking office, Townsend was an activist in the Walk for Life marches whose primary goal was to overturn Roe v. Wade. In 2019, Townsend made headlines posting a photo of herself with a teardrop symbol in support of an anti-abortion bill alleging that allowing aborted babies to die after an abortion is infanticide.

=== Failed congressional bid and defeat in 2022 state senate primary ===
In 2022, Townsend said she gave up the Congress race and a much coveted Trump endorsement to fight Wendy Rogers for an Arizona Senate seat. Townsend lost the August 2022 District 7 State Senate primary to Rogers by a 59.7% to 40.3% margin.

== Personal life ==
Townsend was married to pilot Daniel Townsend, who died in a helicopter crash in 2009. She has three adult children.
