= Food sovereignty (United States) =

US movement for community food control

Bison graze at the Lakota Tribal Park on the Cheyenne River Indian Reservation.

The Food sovereignty movement in the United States is a web of systems, formal and informal organizations focused on minimizing or circumventing corporate profiteering and government regulation in the food industry. While food security focuses on the ability of people to obtain sufficient caloric intake, food sovereignty focuses on the network and ownership of the food itself. There is an emphasis on people's right and ability to shape the policy surrounding the food they consume.

Food sovereignty takes many forms in rural and indigenous communities that have sustained systems of producing their own food. In some cases this involves small-scale animal and plant raising or the sharing of livestock amongst a community. It also involves larger macro policy such as the returning of bison lands to native tribes, protecting fish hatcheries, and legalizing the distribution of raw milk.

The Declaration of Nyéléni at the World Forum for Food Sovereignty in 2007 defined food sovereignty using six principles:

1. Focus on Food for People: At its foundation, this principle treats food as a basic human right rather than a commodity traded primarily for profit, prioritizing nourishment over exports or corporate gain.
2. Value Food Providers: Farmers, fishers, and herders aren’t replaceable links in a supply chain. Their knowledge and labor are treated as essential contributions deserving of protection and respect.
3. Localize Food Systems: Keep producers and consumers close together so communities can directly influence how their food is grown and distributed, rather than depending on long-distance trade networks.
4. Make Decisions Locally: The people who manage land, water, seeds, livestock, and how they do so, should be decided by the communities and territories closest to them, not by distant governments or corporations.
5. Build Knowledge and Skill: Traditional knowledge and skills, passed down through generations of farmers and Indigenous communities, are treated as valuable resources worth preserving and building on, alongside newer agricultural research and innovation.
6. Work with Nature: Rather than relying on practices that deplete soil, water, and biodiversity, food sovereignty emphasizes ecological methods that support long-term environmental health, such as diversified farming and reduced reliance on synthetic inputs.

In the United States food, sovereignty has taken a multitude of avenues including challenges to prevailing regulatory, governmental, and economic structures. For native tribes, this is fighting to preserve seeds and having access to suitable hunting and arable land. Meanwhile, for farmers and homesteaders this takes the form of fighting regulations on raising and processing of animals or even their ability to pasture animals on contested land. Some prominent examples include Herrera v. Wyoming in 2019 and McGirt v. Oklahoma in 2020. While rancher standoffs with the federal government have also played a prominent role and include the Sagebrush Rebellion of the late 1970s and early 1980s and the County Supremacy Movement of the 1990s, as well as the Bundy family standoffs in 2014 and 2016.

== History ==
The idea of food sovereignty, independence and agriculture advocacy can be traced back to the era of Reconstruction. In 1867, Oliver Kelley, William Saunders and six others founded the National Grange. Part of the idea was to create a national secret order of farmers to help restore progress and spur the reconstruction of the south. The Grange, in part thanks to the interstate railroad system and the Panic of 1873, grew massively during reconstruction across the Plains. Membership across the country peaked at 860,000 before falling to 124,000 in 1880 due to declining rail service and a lack of political impetus.

Farmers across the south on their own organized to create the Farmers' Alliance in 1875. They attempted to solve growing financial problems for the region's farmers and helped organize the Populist Party in 1892. Black farmers established the Colored Farmers' National Alliance and Cooperative Union in 1886, and it would end up reaching as far as Georgia. The Farmers' Alliance fell apart after its failed foray into politics and blacklisting by political operatives. The fight for this sovereignty continued across ethnic and political lines into the 20th century. African Americans lost 90% of their land between 1910 and 1970. Fannie Lou Hamer founded the Freedom Farm Cooperative in the 1960s in rural Mississippi. This organization, along with the Federation of Southern Cooperatives, helped connect landless and underserved farmers with resources.

Meanwhile, in cities the Black Panther Party began organizing free breakfast programs across America's largest cities. The modern organization and movement around food sovereignty was introduced on the world stage in 1996 at the World Food Summit in Rome by La Via Campesina. Its introduction was an attempt to expand and build on the narrow goal of tackling food security.

== Indigenous food sovereignty ==
The food sovereignty movement in indigenous communities has a long history of fighting for the right and ability to grow their own food. Reservations and conflict with the U.S. government and settlers forced Native Americans off their land into unfamiliar and less arable land. The Dawes Act in 1887 parceled communally held land into the hands of individual tribe members. From 1887 to the Indian Reorganization Act in 1934, Native Americans lost 90 million acres of land.

The U.S. government often signed treaties granting natives access to land for hunting purposes and sometimes handed out rations instead to nominally keep their end of the deal, if they kept it at all. From 1953 to 1970 federal aid was ended to certain tribes along with recognition of their sovereign status in an effort to promote integration. Ultimately, this led to further erosion of any independence these communities had. Despite these setbacks, indigenous communities, more recently with the help of the Bureau of Indian Affairs, have asserted sovereignty over food.

The Navajo Nation Tribal Council established an agricultural program in 1970 called the Navajo Agricultural Products Industry ("NAPI") which is now supported by the Indian Self-Determination and Education Assistance Act of 1975. In 1993, the American Indian Agricultural Resources Management Act ("AIARMA") was passed to help the BIA facilitate agricultural programs in 46 million acres of native land.

More recently, the 2018 Farm Bill allows native tribes the right to self-determination in how they procure their food and the vendors they buy from. The InterTribal Buffalo Council (ITBC) has worked to help reintroduce bison to tribal lands and now manages 20,000 bison across a million acres of tribal land in conjunction with the National Park Service. The ITBC along with the USDA has allocated $92 million in grants to help foster regenerative and sustainable ranching practices for tribes managing the bison.

Treaty rights and their impact on indigenous sovereignty have been tested in court in recent years. In 2019, the Supreme Court ruled in Herrera v. Wyoming that the Crow Tribe's 1868 treaty right to hunt on unoccupied federal land survived Wyoming's statehood and that the Bighorn National Forest was not "occupied" land under the treaty, in a case brought by Crow member Clayvin Herrera, who was convicted of hunting elk out of season. A year later, in 2020, in McGirt v. Oklahoma, the Court ruled that the Muscogee (Creek) Nation's reservation was never dissolved. While the case concerned criminal jurisdiction rather than food rights, it reaffirmed tribal sovereignty over much of eastern Oklahoma.

== Regulatory conflict ==
Regulatory conflict over food sovereignty has been a longstanding and intersectional issue across the political spectrum. The regulatory agencies of the federal government often serve as the enforcement of federal rules and regulations with mixed success. Some standoffs, while not directly tied to food rights, have a common theme of fighting for more local control of land in their immediate area.

=== Public lands ===
One prominent example is the Sagebrush Rebellion of the late 1970s and early 1980s. It started when miners and loggers across the west opposed what they perceived as "federal colonialism" and absentee landlord policy through legislation ranging from the Wilderness Act to the Endangered Species Act of 1973. These same concerns also intersected significantly with ranchers who faced regulatory limits and pressure on where their cattle could graze. The effort was organized through the League for the Advancement of States Equal Rights (LASER), led by Senators Orrin Hatch, Ted Stevens, and Barry Goldwater among others. There were large pushes to transfer millions of acres into state hands. President Ronald Reagan seized on much of this energy on the way to his election victory in 1980. Reagan's Department of the Interior set up a "good neighbor policy" that allowed surplus lands to be transferred to state hands and exploratory frameworks were set to sell millions of acres. Ultimately, sales and demand for the federal land were limited.

In the 1990s, counties, especially across New Mexico and Nevada launched a county supremacy movement to assert local control over federal lands. Notably, Catron County, New Mexico, known for violent grazing protests in the 1890s, passed a resolution prohibiting federal employees from managing national forest and other federal lands within the county. Catron subsequently passed a rule requiring every head of household to own a firearm to fortify their rights as citizens. 16 of 17 counties in Nevada passed resolutions asserting similar supremacy over federal land and in total over 100 counties across the United States followed suit.

Nye County, Nevada got into indirect confrontation when they passed similar legislation and used bulldozers to reopen a previously closed roadway. County Commissioner Richard Carver went further and filed criminal affidavits against federal officials in an attempt to keep them off the disputed land. A U.S. District Court in Las Vegas nullified Nye County's claims and its subsequent ordinance. Similar legal assertions of county supremacy failed to gain traction in court.

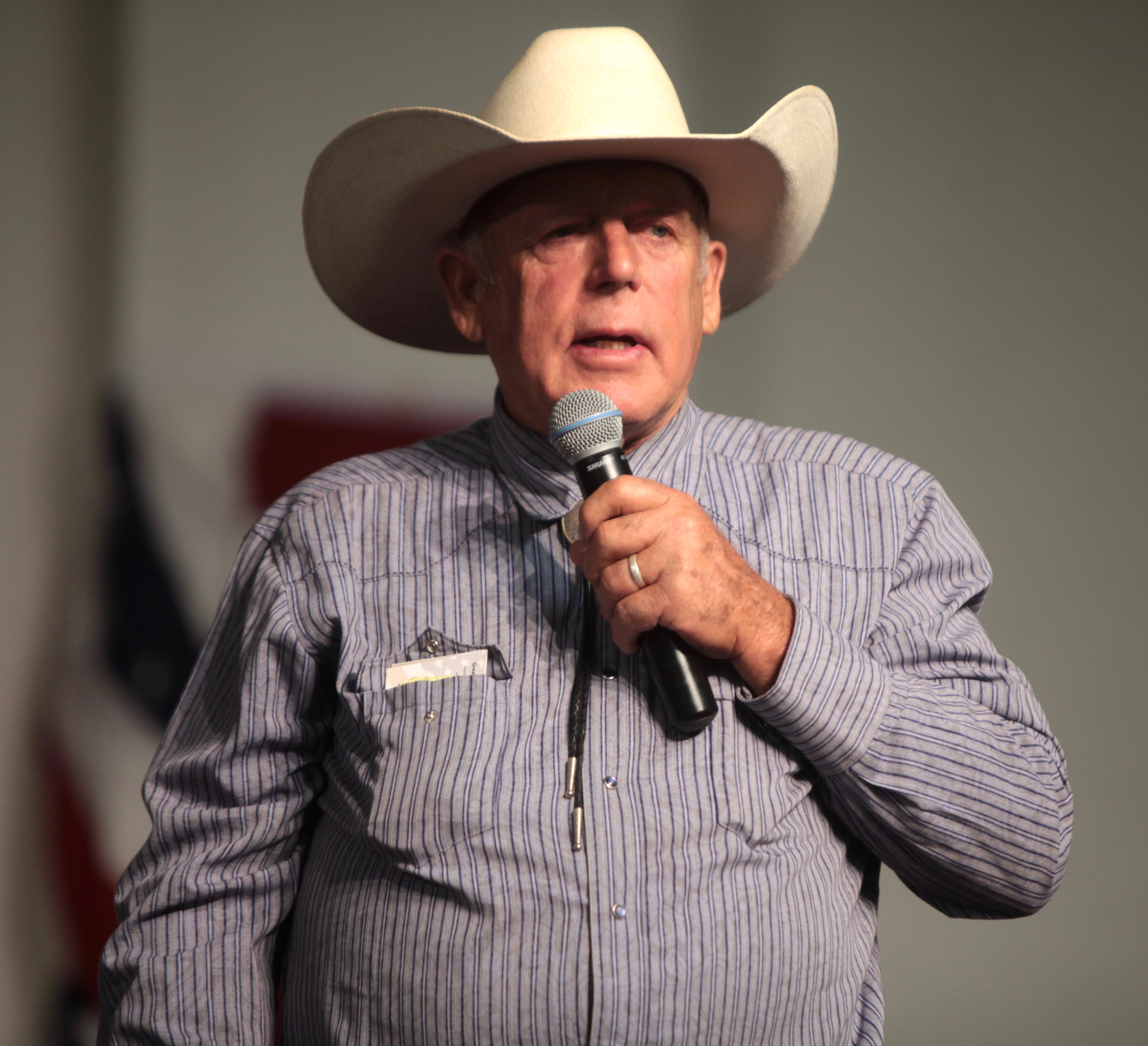
Cliven Bundy

The most famous ranch standoff centers around the Bundy family. In 1989, the U.S. government declared the Mojave desert tortoise an endangered species. This effectively was the beginning of the end of ranching in Clark County, Nevada. After losing legal battles, Cliven Bundy refused in 1993 to recognize federal authority over the land altogether and stopped paying grazing fees. Bundy was ordered to relocate his cattle from the Bunkerville allotment in 1998 and was cited numerous times up to 2014 for refusing to do so. In 2014, BLM began trying to seize Bundy's cattle and auctioning them off, prompting protests from Bundy's family and supporters. Armed militias arrived and vastly outgunned federal authorities, forcing their retreat. U.S. District Judge Gloria Navarro declared a mistrial and then dismissed the charges entirely with prejudice in 2018. Bundy's cattle still reportedly graze on the land without any comment or interference from BLM.

In January 2016, Cliven Bundy's sons Ammon and Ryan Bundy led an armed occupation of the Malheur National Wildlife Refuge in Oregon. The occupation was sparked by the resentencing of ranchers Dwight and Steven Hammond to five years in prison for arson on federal land, and by broader demands to turn federal land over to local control. Ammon and Ryan Bundy and five others were acquitted of federal conspiracy charges in October 2016. The Hammonds were pardoned by President Donald Trump in 2018.

=== Raw milk and food regulation ===
One of the most contentious food sovereignty issues in the United States is the consumption, distribution, and selling of raw milk. In 1973, the FDA published a final rule banning the interstate commerce of raw milk, leaving an exception for "certified raw milk" products. In 1984, the case Public Citizen v. Heckler was brought against the FDA to force a full raw milk ban. In 1987, after a court order, the FDA passed a final rule mandating pasteurization for all milk and dairy products, closing the loophole and banning the products from interstate commerce. Beginning in 1988 states began loosening rules or allowing loopholes to allow residents to access raw milk. Kentucky was the first; in 1988, they allowed raw goat milk sales provided the buyer had a recommendation from a physician. 44 out of 51 states allow some legal access with 12 states legalizing access since 2004.

In June 2010, Vernon Hershberger of Grazin' Acres Farm in Loganville, Wisconsin was raided for operating a dairy plant without a license. The state accused him of violating court orders in 2012, as he used a herdshare program to continue sales and was subsequently brought to trial. Like many other farmers, he operated a private membership association (PMA) to give willing customers access to produce for an annual fee. His defenders called it an attack on food freedom. He was found not guilty on three of the four charges brought against him.

In 2011, Daniel Allgyer of Kinzers, Pennsylvania and owner of Rainbow Acres farm was the target of a year-long FDA sting into his operation, and in February 2012, a federal court issued a permanent injunction barring him from selling raw milk across state lines. While Allgyer did not deny he was selling raw milk across state lines, he said his private membership group precluded the FDA from enjoining his activities. While the FDA tried to shut him down completely a federal judge ruled Allgyer was permitted to sell raw milk within state lines.

On 26 July 2012, 65-year-old James Stewart, the founder of California-based Rawesome Foods (a fresh-food herdshare of 1,600 members), was arrested for illegally selling raw milk. Stewart was charged with 6 felonies and 13 total counts including conspiracy to distribute unpasteurized milk. Co-defendants Sharon Ann Palmer and Eugenie Victoria Bloch pleaded guilty to misdemeanor charges.

== Parallel infrastructure ==
In an effort to increase access to fresh food or agriculture with more stringent regulations, farmers and neighbors often set up private membership organizations, such as herdshares or co-ops to provide voluntary and communal access to members of a community. For example, in Hershberger's case, he leased his animals to the private member group and he was designated as their caretaker and deliverer of animal products, essentially exploiting a loophole by not engaging in commerce. Every state has different regulations. For example, in Oregon herdshares are allowed to operate without a license but any products or samples are not allowed to be given to the general public.

Co-ops have seen a resurgence in the United States with national and regional cooperatives receiving increased interest and participation. Community-supported agriculture or CSAs first emerged in the 1970s before making a recent resurgence. Indian Line Farm in Massachusetts and Temple-Wilton Community Farm in New Hampshire, both founded in 1986, are two longtime examples of CSAs. They are owned by land trusts and focus on organic and biodynamic farming. In a CSA, members pay upfront membership costs to help offset the costs of farmer production and also claim their stake to produce when it's ready to be sold. In 2022, producers sold $17.5 billion in food through direct-sales and CSA type programs, a 25% increase from 2017. However, the number of farm operations (116,617) selling direct to consumer declined 10% in the same period. The Local Inland Northwest Cooperative (LINC Foods) near Spokane, Washington allows individuals, schools, hospitals and restaurants to order directly from farmers through an online marketplace. After starting with $30,000 in sales in 2014, they had expanded to a million dollars in sales by 2020.

In 2015 Wyoming enacted the Food Freedom Act, followed by an expansion in 2017. As of 2019, Wyoming had 50 farmers' markets which represents growth of 70% since the initial legislation passed. The legislation and similar laws in Utah, North Dakota, and Idaho among others explicitly allow direct-to-consumer sales of dairy, meat, and produce without a registration or license. Wyoming is the only state to get an A ranking in its food freedom laws from the libertarian think tank Institute for Justice.

== Conflict with corporations ==
One of the larger conflicts, and an area where food sovereignty has seen setbacks, is its conflict with corporations. Monsanto sued Indiana farmer Vernon Hugh Bowman over using second-generation Monsanto seeds. In 2013, the Supreme Court unanimously ruled in Monsanto's favor citing patent infringement. Despite the seeds not being labeled and being allowed for animal feed, the planting of the seeds was enough to find Bowman guilty of infringement. The case followed a similar pattern to that of Percy Schmeiser, a Saskatchewan farmer, who was sued by Monsanto in 1998 for planting Monsanto seeds without proper licensing. The Supreme Court of Canada ruled in favor of Monsanto although unlike the U.S. the decision was not unanimous.

Transcend Media Service argues that Monsanto bullies farmers who use their products without authorization or even accidentally. By the early 2000s Monsanto had dozens of employees and tens of millions of dollars specifically allocated for patent infringement. Farmers and ranchers have alleged that they are being victimized by large corporate meatpackers such as Tyson. In the current system, Tyson, Perdue, and others supply the chicks, the feed, the medicine, and of course the processing. Processors can on a whim require upgrades and pay more or less for chickens through a tournament system that pits farmers against each other based on the quality of bird they've raised. In 2025, the National Farmers Union (NFU) secured an $83.5 million dollar settlement on behalf of ranchers against beef processor JBS for collusion and price-fixing, stemming from a 2019 lawsuit. On 7 November 2025, President Donald Trump called for an investigation into meatpackers over alleged price fixing.
