= Privatization of public land (United States) =

In the United States, land owned and managed by governmental organizations is referred to as public land. As of 2020, the federal government owns roughly 640 million acres of land, the majority of which is concentrated in the Western US and Alaska. Privatization of public land involves the selling or auctioning of public lands to the private sector. The private sector can refer to private individuals, industry, or corporations.

== History ==
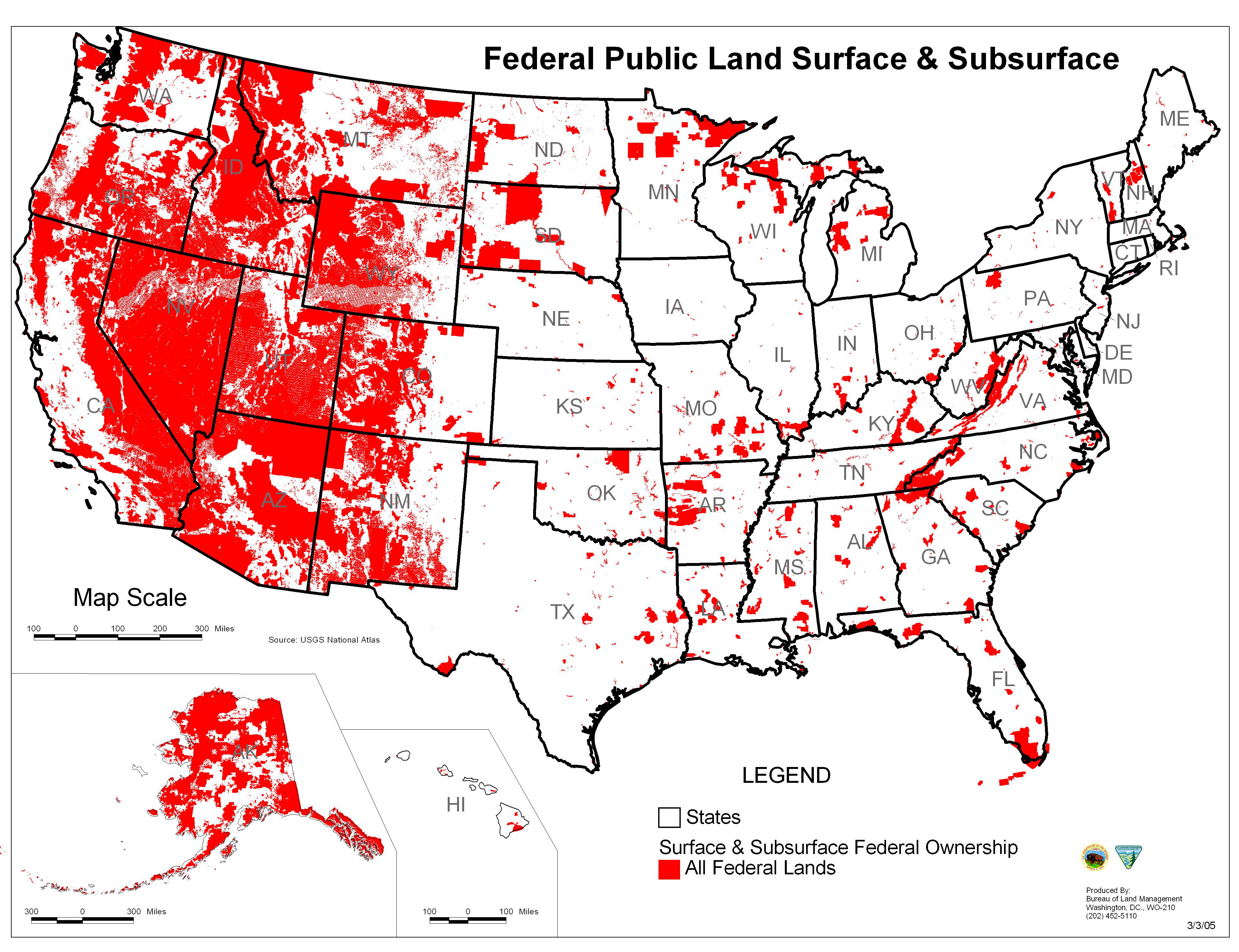
Map of all federally owned land in the United States

=== The Homestead Act ===
On May 20, 1862 President Lincoln signed the Homestead Act into law. This legislation allowed settlers to acquire 160 acres of federal land in the west, provided that they pay a filing fee and maintain residence on the parcel for five continuous years. This was intended to encourage western expansion and settlement into the interior. Between its passage in 1862 and 1900, 80 million acres of federal land had been claimed through the Homestead Act.

=== The Sagebrush Rebellion ===
In much of the west, public land is leased to ranchers as rangeland. Throughout the mid-1900s, federal land managers reduced the number of livestock allowed to graze these lands in order to prevent ecological degradation through overgrazing. These reductions led to building tension between federal land managers and ranchers, who were economically impacted by these grazing reductions. These tensions gave way to a period known as the Sagebrush Rebellion in the 1970s, where ranchers argued for state control over the federal grazing lands. During his presidential campaign in 1980, Ronald Reagan during a speech in Utah declared himself part of the rebellion stating, "I happen to be one who cheers on and supports the 'Sagebrush Rebellion' ". After winning the election, Regan's secretary of the interior James Watts advocated for privatization of these grazing lands in order to appease ranchers and reduce the national deficit through their sale. This advocacy failed after lawsuits from environmental advocates blocked the sale of the land.

== Recent Privatization Initiatives and Proposals ==
- In 2006, President Bush's proposed budget included the auctioning of 300 thousand acres of national forests, 500 million acres of land managed by the Department of the Interior, and 125 thousand acres managed by the Bureau of Land Management in order to reduce the national deficit
- In 2017, President Trump decreased the size of the Bear Ears and Grand Staircase-Escalante National Monuments by over 2 million acres. This allowed the land to be leased by oil, gas and mining companies
