= Neil Kornze =

American government official

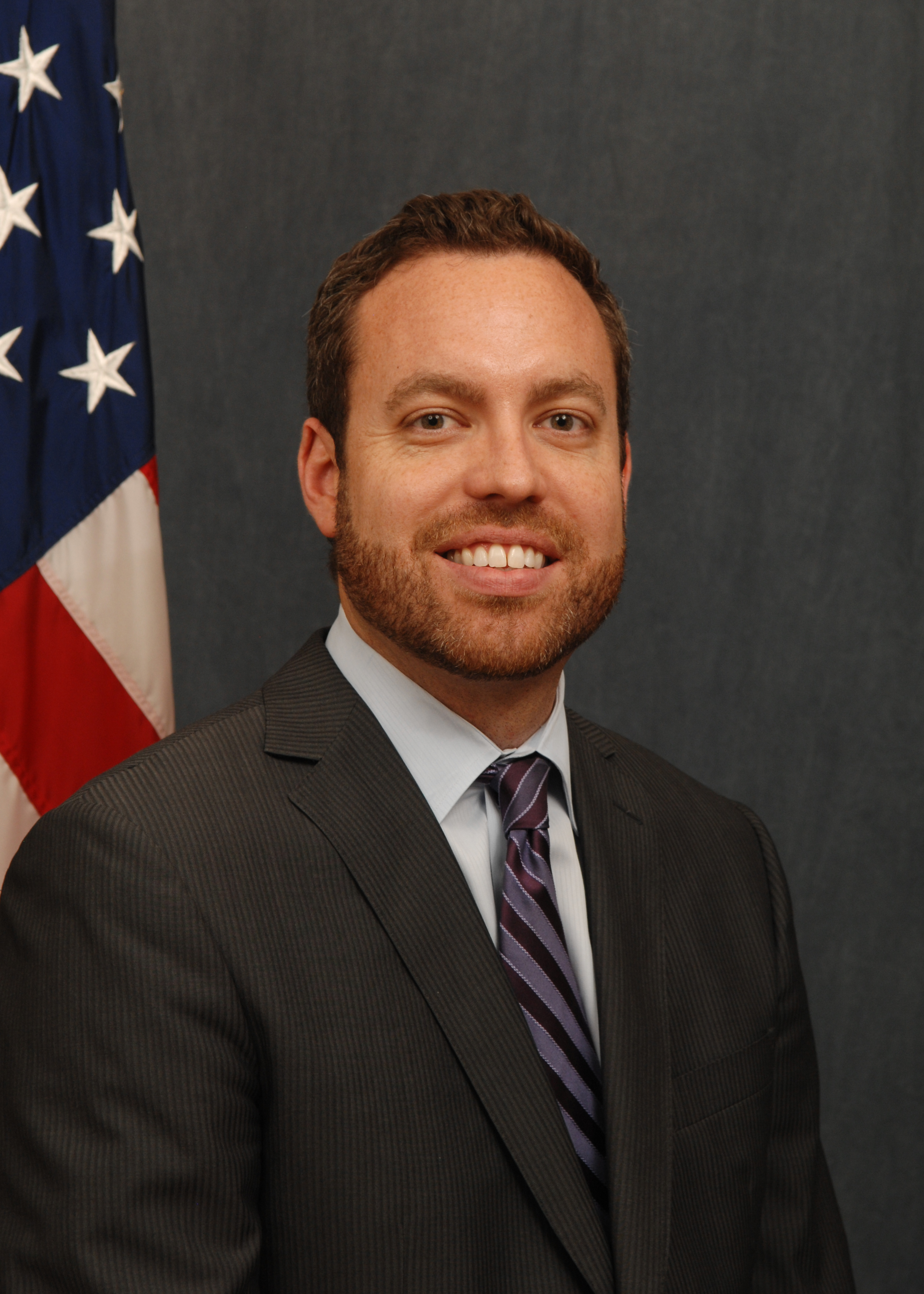

Director of the Bureau of Land Management
- In office April 8, 2014 – January 20, 2017; Acting: March 1, 2013 – April 8, 2014
- President: Barack Obama
- Preceded by: Mike Pool (acting)
- Succeeded by: Kristin Bail (acting)

Personal details
- Born: Elko, Nevada, U.S.
- Education: Whitman College (BA); London School of Economics (MA)

Neil Kornze is an American government official who served as director of the Bureau of Land Management from March 2013 to January 2017 under President Barack Obama.

== Early life and education ==
Kornze was born and raised in Elko, Nevada. He attended Elko High School. He graduated from Whitman College in Walla Walla, Washington, with a bachelor's degree in politics, and then earned a Master of Arts degree in international relations from the London School of Economics.

== Career ==
=== U.S. Senate ===
Kornze served in the office of Nevada Senator Harry Reid from 2003 until 2011, where he worked on a variety of public lands issues, including renewable energy development, mining, water, outdoor recreation, rural development, and wildlife. During his tenure, Kornze participated in the design of the Omnibus Public Land Management Act of 2009, which designated 2 million acres of wilderness, codified the National Landscape Conservation System, and added 1,000 river-miles to the National Wild and Scenic Rivers System.

=== Bureau of Land Management ===
Kornze was the BLM's acting deputy director for policy and programs from October 2011 through March 2013, when he became the Principal Deputy Director and Acting Director, where he worked on renewable and conventional energy, transmission siting, and conservation policy. In November 2013, Kornze was nominated to be the bureau's director and in April 2014, that nomination was confirmed by the U.S. Senate by a vote of 71–28.

Only a few days after his confirmation, Kornze was pulled into the national spotlight due to events related to the Bundy standoff in northeastern Clark County, Nevada.

=== Later career ===
Since 2019, Kornze has worked as the CEO of the Campion Foundation and Campion Advocacy Fund.
