= Scofflaw =

One who flouts a law

Scofflaw is a noun coined during the Prohibition era which originally denoted a person who drinks illegally, or otherwise ignored anti-drinking laws. It is a compound of the words scoff and law. Its use has been extended to mean one who flouts any law, especially those difficult to enforce, and particularly traffic laws.

== Etymology ==
"Scofflaw" was the winning entry of a nationwide competition to create a new word for "the lawless drinker," with a prize of $200 in gold, sponsored by Delcevare King, a banker and enthusiastic supporter of Prohibition, in 1923. Two separate entrants, Henry Irving Dale and Kate L. Butler, submitted the word, and split the $200 prize equally. Scofflaw was deemed the best and most suitable out of over 25,000 entries. The word was from the outset frequently used until the eventual repeal of Prohibition in 1933. It experienced a revival in the 1950s, as a term for anyone who displays disdain for laws difficult to enforce. The word itself remains a symbol of the Prohibition era.
