= Sagebrush Rebellion =

Political movement for local control of U.S. government land

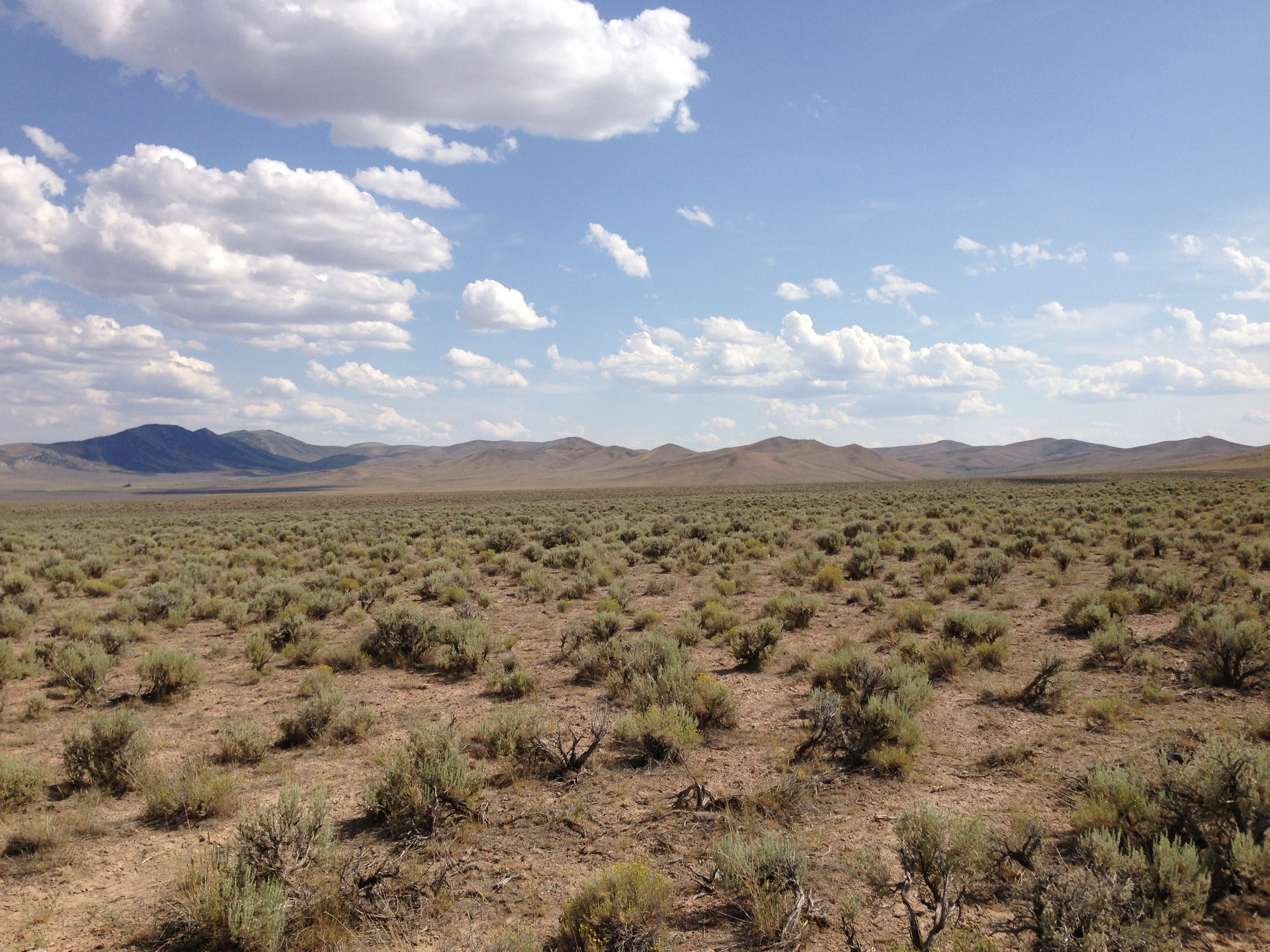
A sagebrush steppe in northeastern Nevada.

The Sagebrush Rebellion was a movement in the Western United States in the 1970s and the 1980s that sought major changes to federal land control, use, and disposal policy in 13 western states in which federal land holdings include between 20% and 85% of a state's area. Supporters of the movement wanted more state and local control over the lands, if not outright transfer of them to state and local authorities and/or privatization. As much of the land in question is sagebrush steppe, supporters adopted the name "Sagebrush Rebellion."

In 1981 James G. Watt, one of the leaders, became Secretary of the Interior in the Presidency of Ronald Reagan, and worked to roll back federal environmental policies.

The movement continues to have support by persons interested in developing the lands for resource extraction and private benefits, such as livestock grazing, mineral extraction, and timber harvesting. Opponents place higher value on private economic benefits by recreation and societal benefits of open space and hard-to-quantify economic benefits of ecosystem services.

== Background ==
The term "Sagebrush Rebellion" was coined during fights over designation of National Wilderness lands, especially in western states, especially after the US Forest Service and the Bureau of Land Management conducted required surveys of plots of public lands of at least 5,000 acres (7.8 sq mi; 20 km^{2}) that had roads removed after 1972 for the potential designation as part of the National Wilderness Preservation System. The process was known as the "Roadless Area Review and Evaluation" (RARE, or later, RARE I). The RARE process developed significant opposition from both environmental groups and public lands users and was challenged in federal court. The results of RARE I were nullified by the courts for lack of uniform criteria for evaluation of lands and other procedural problems. A second review started in 1977, known as RARE II, and involved more than 60 million acres (24 million km^{2}) of wildland under federal jurisdiction. RARE II was completed in 1979, but the effort was largely sidelined during the presidency of Ronald Reagan, who was elected in 1980. Reagan declared himself a sagebrush rebel in an August 1980 campaign speech in Salt Lake City and told the crowd, "I happen to be one who cheers and supports the Sagebrush Rebellion. Count me in as a rebel." Reagan faced opposition from conservation organizations. The struggle persists today after changing form with the "wise use movement" in 1988. Even so, many wilderness areas were signed into law by Reagan during the 1980s, including many identified through the RARE processes.

The National Wilderness Preservation System grew out of recommendations of a Kennedy administration presidential commission, the Outdoor Recreational Resources Review Commission chaired by Laurance Rockefeller, whose 1962 report suggested legislation to protect recreational resources in a "national system of wild and scenic rivers," a national wilderness system, a national trails system, the federal Land and Water Conservation Fund, and recreation areas administered by existing public lands agencies beyond National Parks and National Monuments, both of which are administered in the Department of the Interior by the National Park Service.

Much of the wildland was sagebrush, which some wanted to use for grazing, off-road vehicle use, and other development, instead of wilderness conservation. These "rebels" urged that instead of designating more federal wilderness protection, some or much of the land should be granted to states or private parties. They took on the phrase "Sagebrush Rebellion" to describe their opposition to federal management of the lands.

== Public lands history ==
Map of US federal lands.

Among the first pieces of legislation passed following independence was the Land Ordinance of 1785, which provided for the surveying and sale of lands in the area created by state cessions of western land to the national government. Later, the Northwest Ordinance provided for the political organization of the Northwest Territories (now the states of Michigan, Wisconsin, Ohio, Illinois, Indiana, and part of northeastern Minnesota).

To encourage settlement of western lands, Congress passed the first of several Homestead Acts in 1862, granting parcels in 40-acre (160,000 m^{2}) increments to homesteaders who could maintain a living on land for a period of time. Congress also made huge land grants to various railroads working to complete a transcontinental rail system. Much of the latter grants intentionally included mineral and timber-rich lands so that the railroads could get financing to build. Again, the hypothesis was that the railroads would sell off the land to get money.

Ultimately, however, much of the land west of the Missouri River was not ecologically suited for homesteading because of mountainous terrain, poor soils, lack of available water, and other ecological barriers to significant settlement. By the early 20th century, the federal government held significant portions of most western states that had simply not been claimed for any use. Conservationists prevailed upon President Theodore Roosevelt to set aside lands for forest conservation and for special scientific or natural history interest. Much land still remained unclaimed even after such reserves had been initially set up. The US Department of the Interior held millions of acres in the western states, with Arizona and New Mexico joining the union by 1913. US President Herbert Hoover proposed to deed the surface rights to the unappropriated lands to the states in 1932, but the states complained that the lands had been overgrazed and would also impose a burden during the Great Depression's cash-strapped state budgets. The Bureau of Land Management was created to manage much of that land.

=== Complaints ===
Complaints about federal management of public lands constantly roil relations between public lands users (ranchers, miners, researchers, off-road vehicle enthusiasts, hikers, campers and conservation advocates) and the agencies and environmental regulation on the other. Ranchers complain that grazing fees are too high and that grazing regulations are too onerous despite environmentalist complaints that the opposite is true and that promised improvements to grazing on federal lands do not occur. Miners complain of restricted access to claims, or to lands to prospect. Researchers complain of the difficulty of getting research permits, only to encounter other obstacles in research, including uncooperative permit-holders and, especially in archaeology, vandalized sites with key information destroyed. Off-road vehicle users want free access, but hikers and campers and conservationists complain grazing is not regulated enough and that some mineral lease holders abuse other lands or that off-road vehicle destroy the resource.

== Rebellion ==
Various bills intended to transfer federal public lands to western states had been proposed after 1932, all of which failed to garner much attention, let alone action. Among key objections to such transfers were the increasing value to the federal treasury of mineral lease receipts and complaints that the "crown jewels" of the national lands holdings, the National Parks, could not be managed adequately or fairly by individual states. Yellowstone and Yosemite National Parks were considered to be national treasures, and few legislators would concur with turning them over to the states.

The spark that turned these complaints into a "rebellion" was the enactment in 1976 of the Federal Land Policy and Management Act, which ended homesteading and so the federal government would retain control of the western public lands. The act sought to establish a system of land management by the Bureau of Land Management. The Act required the bureau to plan land use accommodating all users and specifically named ranching, grazing, and mining, but it also introduced formal processes to consider preservation of the land from those uses.

The newly elected Senator Orrin Hatch (R-Utah) joined in land transfer legislation efforts in 1977 after loud complaints from ranchers and oilmen from Utah, coupled with strong support from several Utah county governments. By late 1979, Hatch was the legislator who was the most interested in land transfers. He sought to introduce a transfer bill that would get hearings and potential action. Upon the advice of members of the Utah Wilderness Commission, appointed by Utah Governor Scott Matheson, Hatch agreed to leave National Parks and National Monuments in federal hands, and he drafted a bill that would allow states to apply for control over selected parcels. With 16 cosponsors, he introduced the bill in 1979, and again in 1981. Partly because Hatch's bill dealt with major objections to previous bills, news outlets for the first time covered the bill as if it had a serious chance of passing. That started a two-year newspaper, radio, and television fight for the legislation. It was never passed.

On July 4, 1980, proponents of the Sagebrush Rebellion carved a road into an area in Grand County that was proposed to be designated as wilderness.

The election of Ronald Reagan as president put a friend to the Sagebrush Rebels in the White House; James G. Watt, and his appointees slowed or stopped wilderness designation legislation. By Reagan's second term, the Sagebrush Rebellion was back to simmering on the back burner of federal land management agencies..

== See also ==
- Bundy standoff, 1993–2018
- Bureau of Land Management
- Occupation of the Malheur National Wildlife Refuge, 2016
- Utah Transfer of Public Lands Act, passed into law in 2012, effective after 2014.
