= Robert Keiter =

American lawyer and academic

Robert Keiter (born 1946) is an American lawyer, currently the Wallace Stegner Professor of Law and Distinguished Professor at S. J. Quinney College of Law, University of Utah.
