= Bundy =

Bundy may refer to:

== Places ==
- Bundy, Idaho, a place in Nez Perce County, Idaho
- Bundy, Virginia, an unincorporated community
- Bundy, Wisconsin, an unincorporated community
- Bundy Drive, a street on the west side of Los Angeles
- Expo/Bundy station, a light rail station in Los Angeles County

== People ==
=== Surname ===
- Alan Bundy (born 1947), Edinburgh professor and artificial intelligence researcher
- Bill Bundy (1883–1945), English footballer
- Carol Bundy (1942–2003), American female serial killer
- Cliven Bundy (born 1946), controversial American rancher
  - Ammon Bundy and Ryan C. Bundy, sons of Cliven Bundy and participants in several demonstrations resulting from disputes with the government over land use and ranching fees
- Doc Bundy (born 1946), American race car driver
- Dorothy Cheney (1916–2014), American tennis champion and daughter of Tom and May Sutton Bundy
- Dylan Bundy (born 1992), American baseball player
- Edgar Bundy (1862–1922), English painter
- Francis P. Bundy (1910–2008), American physicist, inventor, and glider pilot
- Gilbert Bundy (1911–1955), American cartoonist and illustrator
- Harvey Hollister Bundy (1888–1963), Assistant US Secretary of State
- Hezekiah S. Bundy (1817–1895), American politician
- John Elwood Bundy (1853–1933), American Impressionist painter
- King Kong Bundy (1955–2019), ring name of American professional wrestler Chris Pallies
- Laura Bell Bundy (born 1981), American actress
- Marquis Bundy (born 1994), American football player
- May Godfrey Sutton Bundy (1886–1975), American tennis champion and wife of Tom Bundy
- McGeorge Bundy (1919–1996), head of the Ford Foundation and member of Kennedy administration
- Olivia Newton Bundy (born 1968), stage name of Brian Tutunick, of the rock group Marilyn Manson
- Omar Bundy (1861–1940), U.S. Army general
- Sam D. Bundy (1906–1983), American politician and educator
- Solomon Bundy (1823–1889), American politician and lawyer
- Ted Bundy (1946–1989), American serial killer, necrophile, kidnapper, and rapist, born Theodore Robert Cowell
- Tom Bundy (1881–1945), American tennis player
- Trace Bundy (born 1977), American acoustic guitar player
- William Bundy (1917–2000), American foreign affairs advisor to presidents Kennedy and Johnson

== Other people ==
- Bundy K. Brown, American musician
- George Bundy Smith (1937–2017), American judge
- Allen Christensen (footballer) (born 1991), Australian rules footballer

== Art, entertainment, and media ==
- Bundy: An American Icon, a 2009 horror film
- Bundy, the surname of a dysfunctional family on the sitcom Married... with Children
  - Al Bundy, head of the family
- "Bundy", a song by Animal Alpha from the 2005 album Pheromones

== Biology ==
- Bundy, a common name for the tree species Eucalyptus goniocalyx

== Brands and enterprises ==
- Bundy (DNS server), the successor version of the BIND 9 DNS server software
- A colloquial name for Australia's Bundaberg Rum
- A slang term for a time clock, named for its inventor, Willard L. Bundy, or for the Bundy Manufacturing Company
- A line of musical instruments manufactured by The Selmer Company
- Bundy Manufacturing Company, an American manufacturer of timekeeping devices, now part of IBM

== Law ==
- Bundy standoff, A 20-year legal dispute between Cliven Bundy and the U.S.A. BLM division
- Lloyds Bank Limited v Bundy, a leading English contract case on unequal bargaining power

== Other uses ==
- A colloquial name for time clocks in Australian English.

== See also ==
- Bundey (disambiguation)
- Ted Bundy (disambiguation)
