= Hundred of Bundey =

The Hundred of Bundey refers to a cadastral unit. It could be

- Hundred of Bundey (Northern Territory)
- Hundred of Bundey (South Australia)

== See also ==
- Bundey (disambiguation)
