= Ted Bundy (disambiguation) =

Ted Bundy (1946–1989) was an American serial killer.

Ted Bundy may also refer to:

- Ted Bundy (film), a 2002 biographical film
- Ted Bundy: American Boogeyman, a 2021 crime film
- Ted Bundy: Falling for a Killer, a 2020 true crime docuseries
- "Ted Bundy", a 2020 song by Theory of a Deadman from Say Nothing

== See also ==
- Bundy: An American Icon, a 2009 horror film
- Conversations with a Killer: The Ted Bundy Tapes, a 2019 docuseries
- "The Ted Bundy Song", a 1993 song by Macabre from Sinister Slaughter
- Bundy (disambiguation)
