= Hundred of Beaconsfield =

Land division in Northern Territory to 1976

Coordinates: 12°51′00″S 131°17′42″E

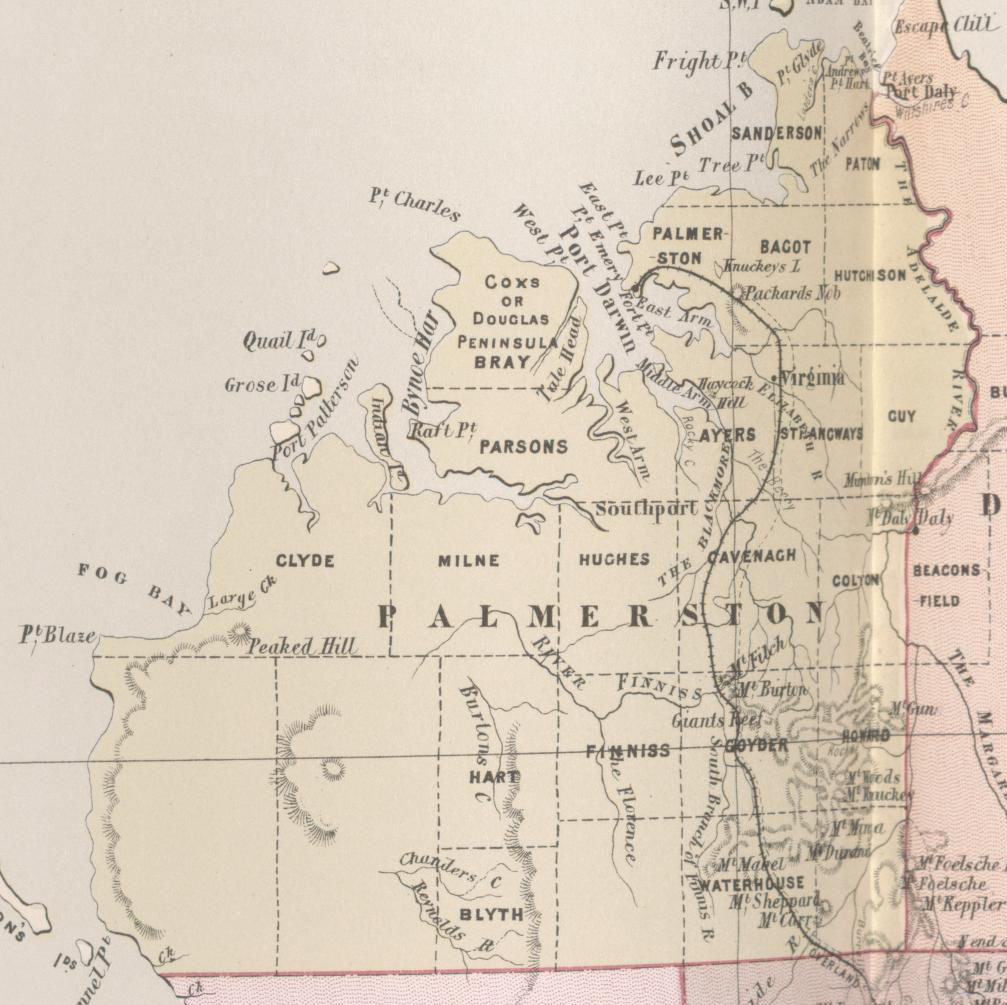
Map of Palmerston County in 1886, showing Beaconsfield at right of map.

The Hundred of Beaconsfield was a hundred within the now-lapsed County of Disraeli in the Northern Territory of Australia.

The Hundred and the County were named after Benjamin Disraeli.

The Hundred officially lapsed with the passage in 1976 and assent of the Crown Lands Ordinance 1976 (No 1 of 1977) and the Crown Lands (Validation of Proclamations) Ordinance 1976 (No.2 of 1977).
