= Cliven Bundy =

American cattle rancher (born 1946)

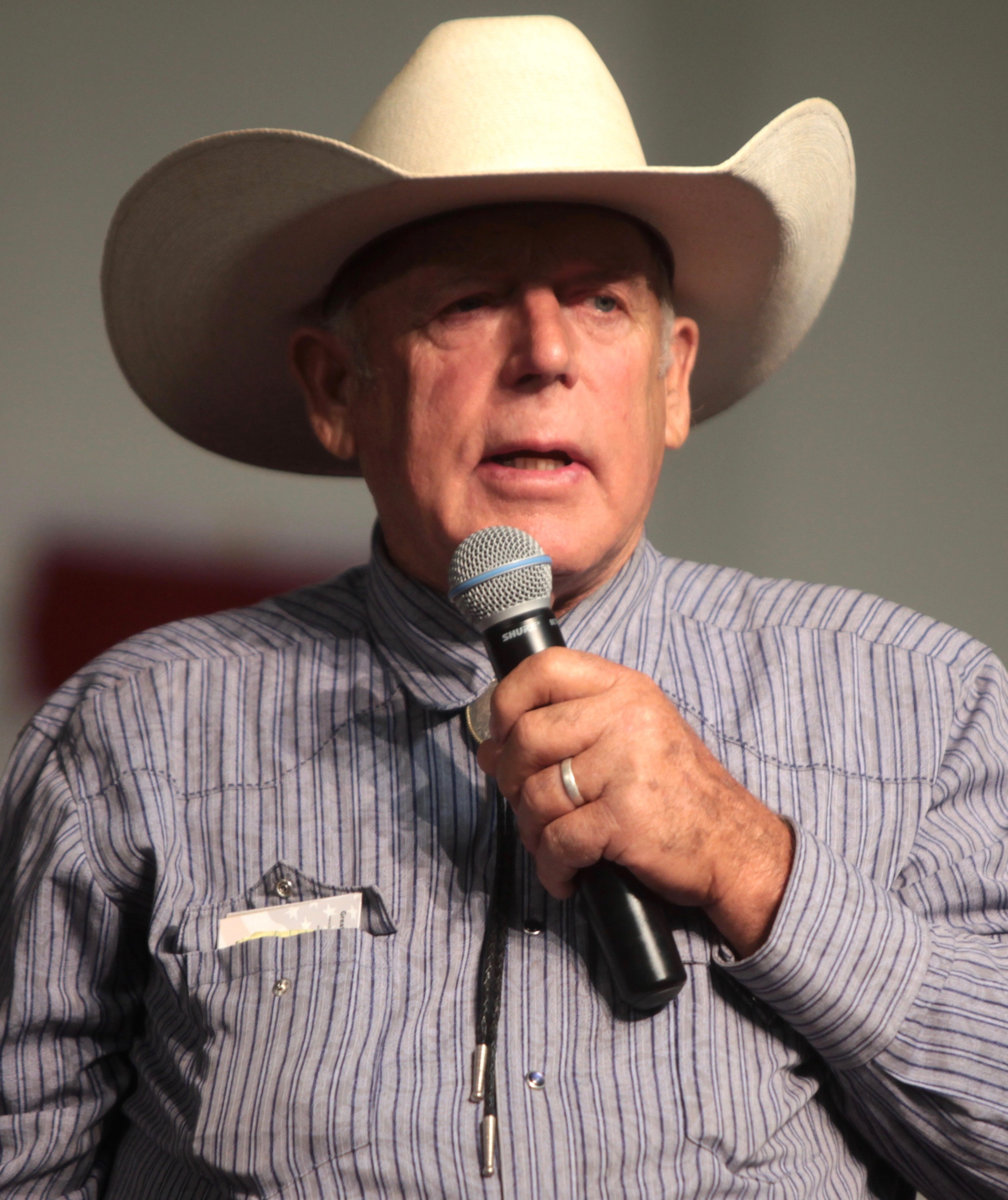
- Bundy in 2014
- Born: April 29, 1946 (age 80); Las Vegas, Nevada, U.S.
- Occupation: Rancher
- Known for: Bundy standoff
- Political party: Republican; Independent American Party
- Criminal charge: Conspiracy
- Children: 14, including Ammon and Ryan
- Relatives: Celeste Maloy (niece)

Cliven D. Bundy (born April 29, 1946) is an American cattle rancher known for his role in the 2014 Bundy standoff. Bundy has advocated a philosophy opposed to what he views as federal government overreach. He is the father of Ammon Bundy, who in 2016 also led another armed standoff against the government, the occupation of the Malheur National Wildlife Refuge in Oregon.

Bundy initiated the 2014 Bundy standoff in Nevada, an armed standoff with federal and state law enforcement over defaulted grazing fees. On February 10, 2016, Cliven Bundy was arrested by the Federal Bureau of Investigation (FBI) at the Portland International Airport while he was on his way to support the Occupation of the Malheur National Wildlife Refuge. He was placed in federal custody, facing federal charges related to his own standoff with the Bureau of Land Management in 2014. On January 8, 2018, Judge Gloria Navarro declared a mistrial and dismissed the charges because the federal government had withheld potentially exculpatory evidence.

Bundy has participated in, and had links with various related movements, including anti-government activism (which opposes federal government involvement in favor of state and local governments) and the sovereign citizen movement (which holds that people are answerable only to their particular interpretation of the common law and are not subject to any government statutes or proceedings). Some view him as a hero for having led a movement of ranchers to encourage more ranchers to join him in defaulting on their grazing fees as per their federal grazing contracts. Bundy's views have also generated significant controversy and criticism; for instance, he came under fire for remarks suggesting that African Americans might have been better off under slavery.

== Early life ==
Bundy was born on April 29, 1946, in Las Vegas, to David Ammon Bundy and Bodel Jensen Bundy. His father started grazing cattle on an allotment near the farm in Bunkerville, Nevada that he purchased in 1949 while his mother had settled on land near Mesquite, Nevada.

== Worldview ==
Bundy advocated for limited federal government involvement in local affairs, particularly in ranching.

Bundy supported the ideas of the sovereign citizen movement. Many of the adherents of the movement argue that the federal government is illegitimate and does not have jurisdiction over individuals, meaning that laws do not apply to them. Bundy had asked for the support of members of the Oath Keepers, the White Mountain Militia, and the Praetorian Guard.

Cliven Bundy has said he does not recognize federal police power over land that he believes belongs to the "sovereign state of Nevada."

Bundy has denied the jurisdiction of the federal court system over Nevada land and filed an unsuccessful motion to dismiss the Bureau of Land Management case against him by claiming the federal courts have no jurisdiction because he is a "citizen of Nevada, not the territory of Nevada". Bundy also believes that federally owned land in Nevada actually belongs to the state.

J. J. MacNab, who writes for Forbes about anti-government extremism, described Bundy's views as having been inspired by the sovereign citizen movement, whose adherents claim that the county sheriff is the most powerful law-enforcement officer in the country, with authority superior to that of any federal agent, local law-enforcement agency or any other elected official. According to The Guardian, Bundy told his supporters that "We definitely don't recognize [the BLM director's] jurisdiction or authority, his arresting power or policing power in any way," and in interviews he used the sovereign citizen language, thereby gaining the support of members of the Oath Keepers, the White Mountain Militia and the Praetorian Guard militias. The sovereign citizen movement is considered by the FBI as a major domestic terrorism threat.

On April 12, 2014, Bundy demanded Clark County Sheriff Doug Gillespie to confront the federal agents, disarm them and deliver their arms to Bundy within an hour of his demand, and later expressed disappointment that Gillespie did not comply.

The Southern Poverty Law Center has described Bundy's views as closely aligned with those of the Posse Comitatus organization, and it has also asserted that such self-described "patriot" groups were focused on secession, nullification, and the principles of the Tenther movement.

In May 2014, Bundy changed his party affiliation from the Republican Party to the Independent American Party.

=== Religion ===
Bundy is a member of the Church of Jesus Christ of Latter-day Saints and has attributed the outcome of the standoff to divine intervention.

== Cattle grazing dispute ==
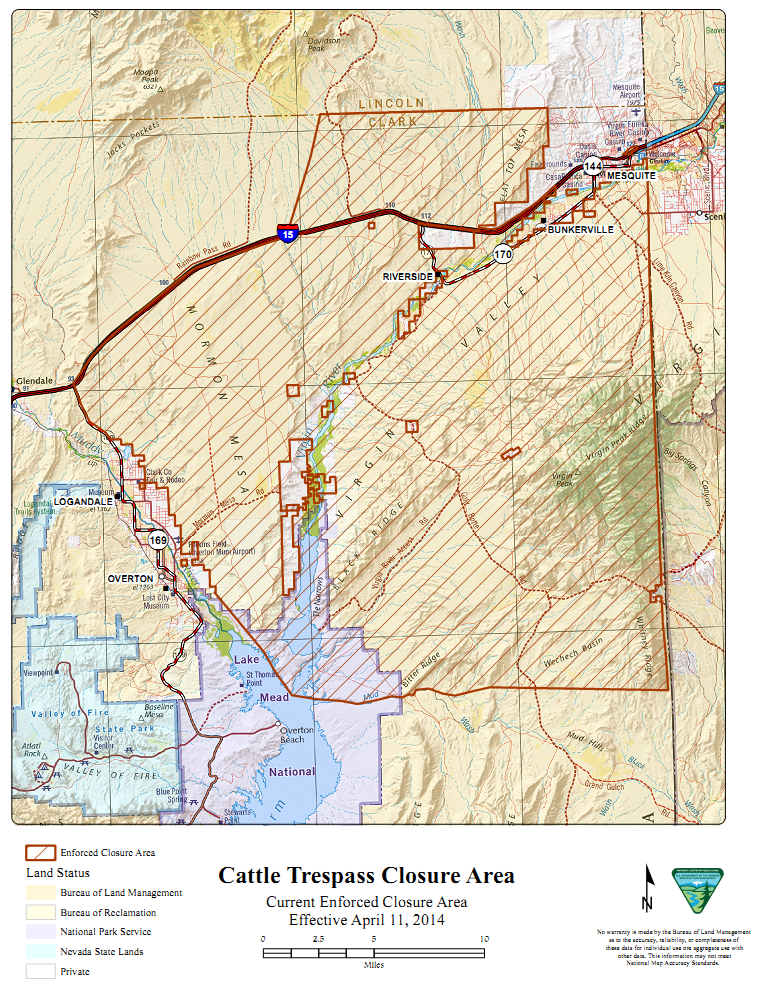
BLM Trespass Cattle Closure Map, April 11, 2014.

The Bundy standoff was an armed confrontation between protesters and law enforcement that developed from a 20-year legal dispute between the United States Bureau of Land Management (BLM) and Cliven Bundy over unpaid grazing fees on federally owned land in southeastern Nevada.

The dispute started in 1993, when, in protest against changes to grazing rules, Bundy declined to renew his permit for cattle grazing on BLM-administered lands near Bunkerville, Nevada. According to the Bureau of Land Management, Bundy continued to graze his cattle on public lands without a permit. In 1998, Bundy was prohibited by the United States District Court for the District of Nevada from grazing his cattle on an area of land later called the Bunkerville Allotment. In July 2013, U.S. District Judge Lloyd D. George ordered that Bundy refrain from trespassing on federally administered land in the Gold Butte area of Clark County.

On March 27, 2014, 145,604 acres (58,924 ha) of federal land in Clark County were temporarily closed for the "capture, impound, and removal of trespass cattle". BLM officials and law enforcement rangers began a roundup of such livestock on April 5, and an arrest was made the next day. On April 12, a group of protesters, some of them armed, advanced on what the BLM described as a "cattle gather". Sheriff Doug Gillespie negotiated with Bundy and newly confirmed BLM director Neil Kornze, who elected to release the cattle and de-escalate the situation. As of October 2026, Bundy continues to graze his cattle on Federal land and has not paid the fees.

During an interview with a journalist following the standoff, Bundy cited Article 1, Section 8, Clause 17 of the Constitution to assert the federal government is limited to owning ten square miles of land, though the clause actually limits the District of Columbia to "ten Miles square."

== Charges of racism ==
About a week after the climax of the standoff, on April 19, 2014, Bundy spoke about witnessing a civil disturbance, the 1965 Watts riots. Bundy described his views about unhappiness at that time and criticized what he saw as government interference and its influence on African Americans. He recalled later seeing a public housing project in North Las Vegas where some of the older residents and the children sat on the porch. He said:

I want to tell you one more thing I know about the Negro. When I go to Las Vegas, North Las Vegas, and I would see these little Government houses, and in front of that Government house the door was usually open, and the older people and the kids and there was always at least half a dozen people on the porch. They didn't have nothing to do, they didn't have nothing for the kids to do, they didn't have nothing for the young girls to do. They were basically on government subsidy, so now what do they do? They abort their young children, they put their young men in jail, because they never learned how to pick cotton. And I've often wondered, are they better off as slaves, picking cotton and having a family life and doing things, or are they better off under government subsidy? They didn't get no more freedom. They got less freedom.

A year later Bundy called the reaction to his statements a "misunderstanding," saying he was not racist and that he should not have used the term "Negro." He added: "I've never had a black person or a brown person ever say anything bad about me." He then proceeded to make further statements about race, comparing "welfare and housing" to slavery. He expressed support for blacks who have "raised themselves up to a point where they are equal with the rest of us." As an alternative to government jobs and programs, he touted private-sector work. "We don't need leeches feeding off us and eating off of us," he said. "We need producers."

=== Response by public officials ===
Then Minority Leader Democratic U.S. Senator from Nevada, Harry Reid, condemned the Bundy statement and said Bundy had,

"...revealed himself to be a hateful racist. But by denigrating people who work hard and play by the rules while he mooches off public land he also revealed himself to be a hypocrite ... It is the height of irresponsibility for any individual or entity in a position of power or influence to glorify or romanticize such a dangerous individual ... For their part, national Republican leaders could help show a united front against this kind of hateful, dangerous extremism by publicly condemning Bundy."

On April 23, 2014, Bundy defended his comments by saying "the statement was right".

A number of Republican politicians and talk-show hosts who previously had supported Bundy, forcefully condemned his remarks as racist, including then-U.S. Senator Dean Heller of Nevada, who previously had described Bundy defenders as "patriots", and U.S. Senator Rand Paul of Kentucky. On April 23, 2014, Heller said through a spokesperson that he "completely disagrees with Mr. Bundy's appalling and racist statements, and condemns them in the most strenuous way".

=== Response by the media ===
Sean Hannity, who had initially supported Bundy in his Fox News talk show, had interviewed Bundy several times, and had called him "a friend and frequent guest of the show", later said that Bundy's remarks were "beyond repugnant". Glenn Beck condemned Bundy's comments as "unhinged from reality" and urged his supporters to "end your relationship" with him.

Writing for the Los Angeles Times, Patt Morrison saw the incident as one of many where an ordinary person is "turned into the poster boy or the poster girl of some political battle du jour." Morrison wrote, "It happens so often that Las Vegas may have a betting line, not on whether these folks will implode but when. The Cliven Bundys of American politics, bit players who are suddenly promoted to center stage, are never as good as their adherents want them to be. They are not empty vessels, but they are flawed ones."

Ben Swann questioned whether Bundy's "inarticulate" comments were given a "truthful representation", and published a video segment which includes the comments preceding and following the quotation published by Adam Nagourney of The New York Times.

Joseph Curl, writing for The Washington Times, described Bundy's views as incorrect and noted the New York Times had failed to print an entire transcript of the remarks.

=== Other ===
According to Geoffrey Lawrence, deputy policy director at the Nevada Policy Research Institute, Bundy lost personal credibility with his racist remarks. Lawrence argues that the discussion about federal land use in the West should not be abandoned, and that Congress should act to correct the "harsh and unfair federal misuse of state lands".

== 2016 arrest and prosecution ==
Bundy was arrested at Portland International Airport in Oregon on February 10, 2016, while attempting to travel to Burns, Oregon to support militants at the Malheur National Wildlife Refuge. Bundy was booked into the downtown Multnomah County jail.

In a 32-page criminal complaint, federal prosecutors charged Bundy with one count of conspiracy to commit an offense against the United States, one count of assault on a federal officer by use of a deadly weapon and aiding and abetting, two counts of use and carrying of a firearm in relation to a crime of violence and aiding and abetting, one count of interfering with commerce by extortion and aiding and abetting, and one count of obstruction of the administration of justice and aiding and abetting.

Bundy made his first appearance before U.S. Magistrate Judge Janice M. Stewart in the U.S. District Court for the District of Oregon in Portland on February 11. He sought court-appointed counsel. At a detention hearing on February 16, Stewart ordered Bundy to be held without bail, citing the serious nature of the charges and the risk of flight. A preliminary hearing was held on March 4, 2016, at the Las Vegas federal courthouse.

On March 10, Bundy refused to enter a plea to the charges against him, as well as recognize federal authority in the courtroom. U.S. Magistrate Judge Carl Hoffman subsequently entered a plea of not guilty for Bundy and scheduled his detention hearing on March 17. His trial was initially scheduled for May 2, but it was postponed to February 6, 2017. Two more of his sons, Melvin and David, were arrested on charges related to the Bundy standoff, along with 12 other men who were likewise involved.

On March 10, 2016, Bundy also filed a lawsuit against Judge Gloria Navarro, Senator Harry Reid, Reid's son Rory, and President Barack Obama, alleging a number of conspiracy theories and describing the judge as a "Latino activist." A day later, Bundy's lawyer attempted to serve the judge with the lawsuit during a detention hearing, demanding that the judge recuse herself from the proceedings because she was now involved in a legal conflict with Bundy. The motion was quickly denied, but the judge gave Bundy's lawyer until May 25 to make a case as to whether her previous work as a prosecutor in Clark County, Nevada merited any recusal. On May 25, Judge Navarro denied Bundy's motion for her recusal from the case, and ruled that he would not be granted bail due to factors including:

- His history of ignoring federal laws and court orders.
- The number of supporters willing to act as armed bodyguards.
- The chance that he would flee from arrest or fail to report for court appearances as ordered.
- The potential for violence by his supporters, constituting a danger to the community.

Charlie Pierce, writing for Esquire, described Bundy's legal maneuvers as "a bubbling stew of pure crazy" sounding "like it was dialed in from someone's car to the worst talk-radio show on Planet Stupid"; while Amanda Marcotte of Salon described it as a nuisance lawsuit and an "incoherent scattershot of a lawsuit." On October 17, 2016, Bundy dismissed his lawsuit against Navarro, President Obama, and the Reids.

In a memo dated November 27, 2017, BLM lead investigator Larry Wooten alleged that he was removed from his role in the Bundy case for objecting to a "widespread pattern of bad judgment, lack of discipline, incredible bias, unprofessionalism and misconduct, as well as likely policy, ethical and legal violations among senior and supervisory [BLM] staff." However, a prior internal investigation by BLM special agent Kent Kleman contradicted Wooten's particular allegations that staff assigned to the case withheld evidence that would assist the Bundy defense.

On December 21, 2017, a mistrial was declared by Judge Navarro, citing a "willful" failure by federal prosecutors to turn over FBI and BLM documents that would potentially aid the defense. Soon thereafter on January 8, 2018, Navarro dismissed with prejudice all charges against Cliven Bundy and his sons, thus forbidding any retrial of the defendants. In her decision, Navarro further criticized prosecutors for willful violations of defendants' due process rights, as well as the aforementioned failure to properly turn over evidence to their lawyers. The government appealed the dismissal.

=== United States Appeal to the US 9th Circuit Court of Appeals ===
On August 6, 2020, the 9th United States Circuit Court of Appeals in San Francisco denied an appeal by United States prosecutors to reinstate the criminal prosecution of the Bundys related to the 2014 armed standoff in Nevada and the 2016 armed protest and occupation of the Malheur National Wildlife Refuge in Oregon. The appeals court ruled that the dismissal of the case against the Bundys due to the prosecution withholding documents and other materials requested by the defense attorneys was proper and supported by the record of the case. The appeals court stopped short of affirming that prosecutorial misconduct had occurred and stated that “misjudgments" by prosecutors did not rise to professional misconduct in the case.

=== Western Watersheds Project Lawsuit ===
In September 2023, the Western Watersheds Project sued the federal government, arguing that the BLM's failure to round up and remove Bundy's cattle from protected lands constituted a violation of the Endangered Species Act. In response to the lawsuit, Bundy blamed the federal government for failing to protect the tortoises, promoted conspiracy theories claiming that environmental laws are just "a moneymaking project for the government and the environmental community," reiterated his previous conspiracy theory claims that the federal government is a "foreign government" whose laws he does not have to comply with and asserted he would once again engage in armed resistance of any attempt to round up and confiscate the cattle or remove them from the lands he illegally grazes them on.

== Personal life ==
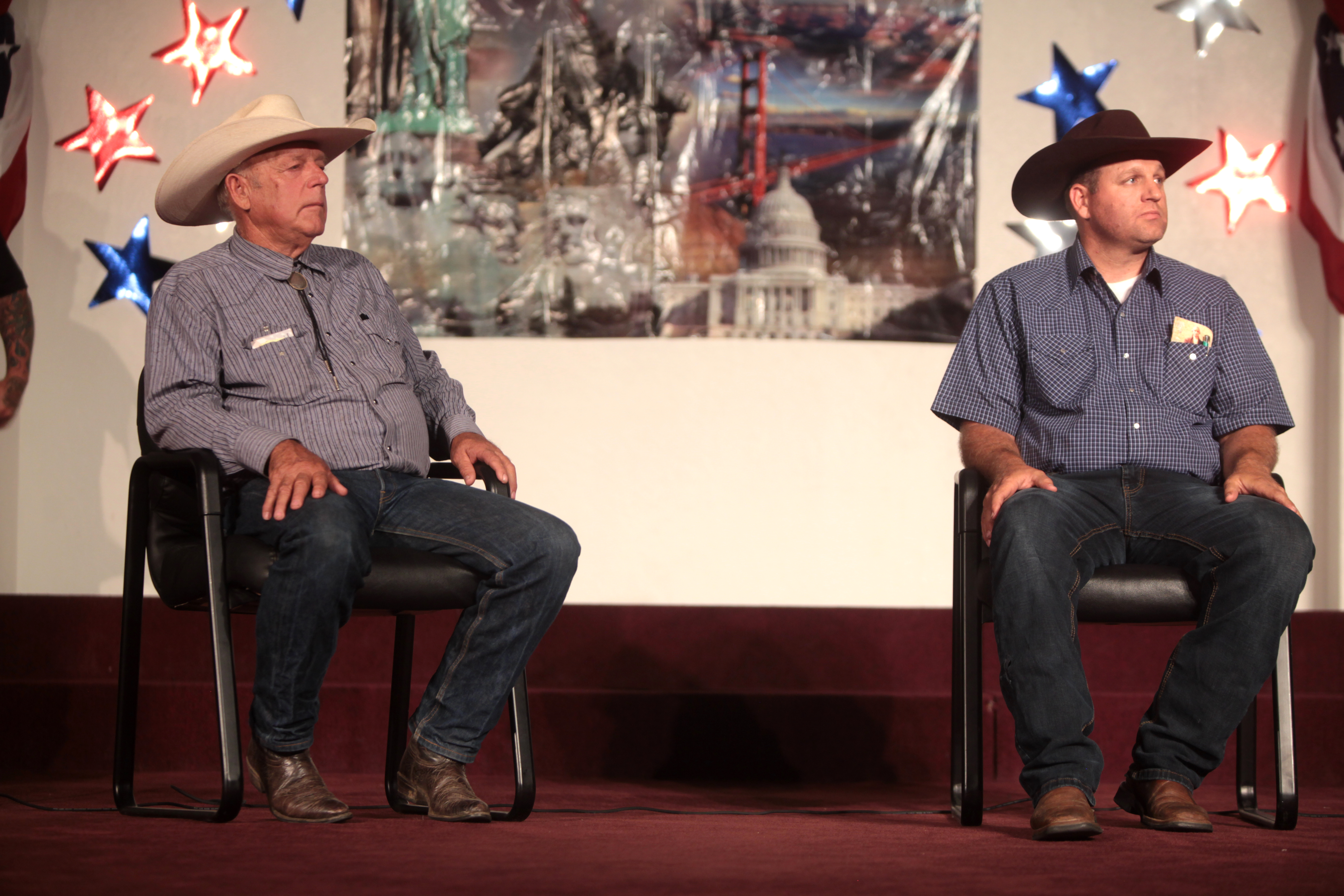
Cliven Bundy with his son Ammon in 2014

Bundy has claimed he was a descendant of Mayflower Pilgrims. Prior to his incarceration, Bundy lived in his family home which he built with his father. Bundy has 14 adult children and 60 grandchildren. His children include Ammon Bundy and Ryan Bundy, two of the leaders of the 2016 occupation of the Malheur National Wildlife Refuge. His niece is U.S. Representative Celeste Maloy from Utah's 2nd congressional district

In a 2015 biography, The Guardian reported that Cliven Bundy did not carry a weapon out of concern it would make him an assassination target. The Guardian also reported that prior to his 2016 arrest, Bundy was protected by an armed body guard which he then claimed had 100 "heavy operators" in the Nevada area, ready to protect him if called upon.
