= David Pettinger =

American far-right activist (born 1977)

David Pettinger is an antisemitic, racist, far-right political activist prominent in Idaho political guerilla theater for such actions as brownface, Nazi cosplay (including at a Tesla takedown), and wearing a large, yellow Star of David. He is an associate of Ammon Bundy. On January 11, 2021 he was arrested the grounds of the Idaho Statehouse on an outstanding misdemeanor warrant for disturbing the peace at then-county commissioner's Diana Lachiondo's home. On February 18, 2021, he was arrested on an misdemeanor outstanding warrant by Idaho State Police at the Idaho Capitol for misdemeanor charges of obstructing officers and assault on an officer.

On March 29, 2025 in Meridian, Idaho he cosplayed Adolf Hitler at a Tesla dealership in Meridian, Idaho wearing a red t-shirt of Elon Musk giving the Fascist salute.

On March 31, 2025 he was invited into the GOP caucus at the Idaho Senate from the visitor's gallery; he was wearing a RINO decal on the back of his shirt at the time. An avowed free speech absolutist, he is also well-known for doxxing, as in the rape trial of former Idaho legislator Aaron von Ehlinger. Born in 1977, he currently resides in Eagle, Idaho.
