= Bundey =

Bundey may refer to:

== Places ==
- Mount Bundey, Northern Territory, Australia
- Bundey, South Australia, a locality northeast of Eudunda in South Australia

== People ==
- William Henry Bundey (1838–1909), politician and judge in South Australia
- William Bundey (mayor) (1826–1889), Mayor of Adelaide, South Australia from 1883 to 1886

== See also ==
- Bundy (disambiguation)
- Hundred of Bundey (disambiguation)
