= County of Disraeli =

County of Disraeli Northern Territory
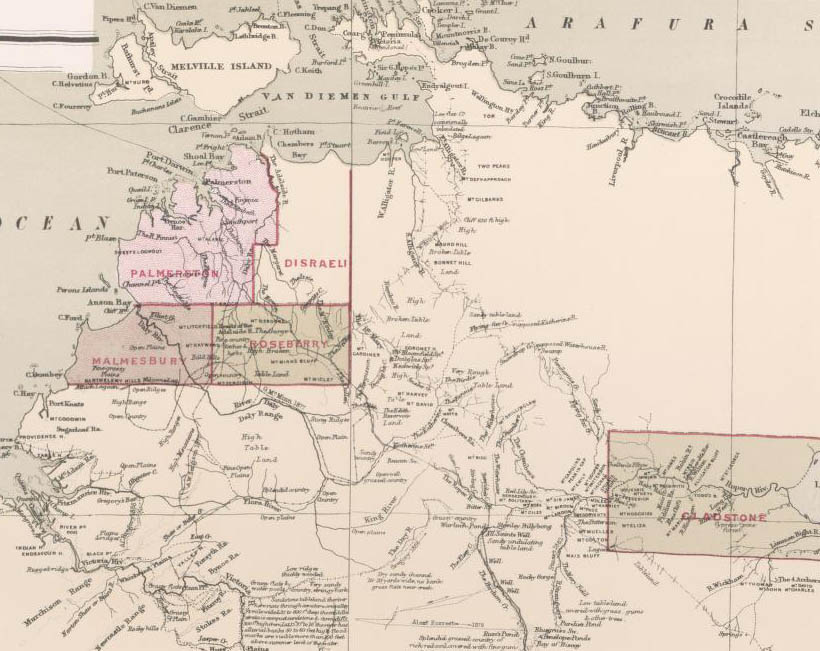
- 1886 map showing the small part of the Northern Territory subdivided into five counties

- Coordinates: 12°40′0″S 131°35′0″E
- Established: 9 January 1873

County of Disraeli is one of the five counties in the Northern Territory which are part of the cadastral divisions of Australia.

The county was created in 1873 centered on the Marrakia area but, only two hundreds were ever allocated to it.

Like the other Counties of the Northern Territory, Disraeli is named for a British prime minister, In this case Benjamin Disraeli.

== Hundreds ==
- Hundred of Beaconsfield
- Hundred of Bundey
