= Idaho Department of Health and Welfare =

Public health agency in Idaho, USA

Agency overview
- Formed: c. 1972
- Jurisdiction: Government of Idaho
- Headquarters: 450 W State St, Fl 10; Boise, Idaho, U.S.
- Agency executive: Juliet Charron, Director

Idaho Department of Health and Welfare is a public health agency in the state of Idaho.

== History ==
The department was founded in 1972.

== Functions ==
The department provides healthcare services, records management, children and family services, food assistance programs, and healthcare services. The department operates several nursing facilities in the state and regulates licensing and certification standards for healthcare workers.

The department has also been responsible for managing the state's response to the COVID-19 pandemic in Idaho.
