= Hundred of Bundey (Northern Territory) =

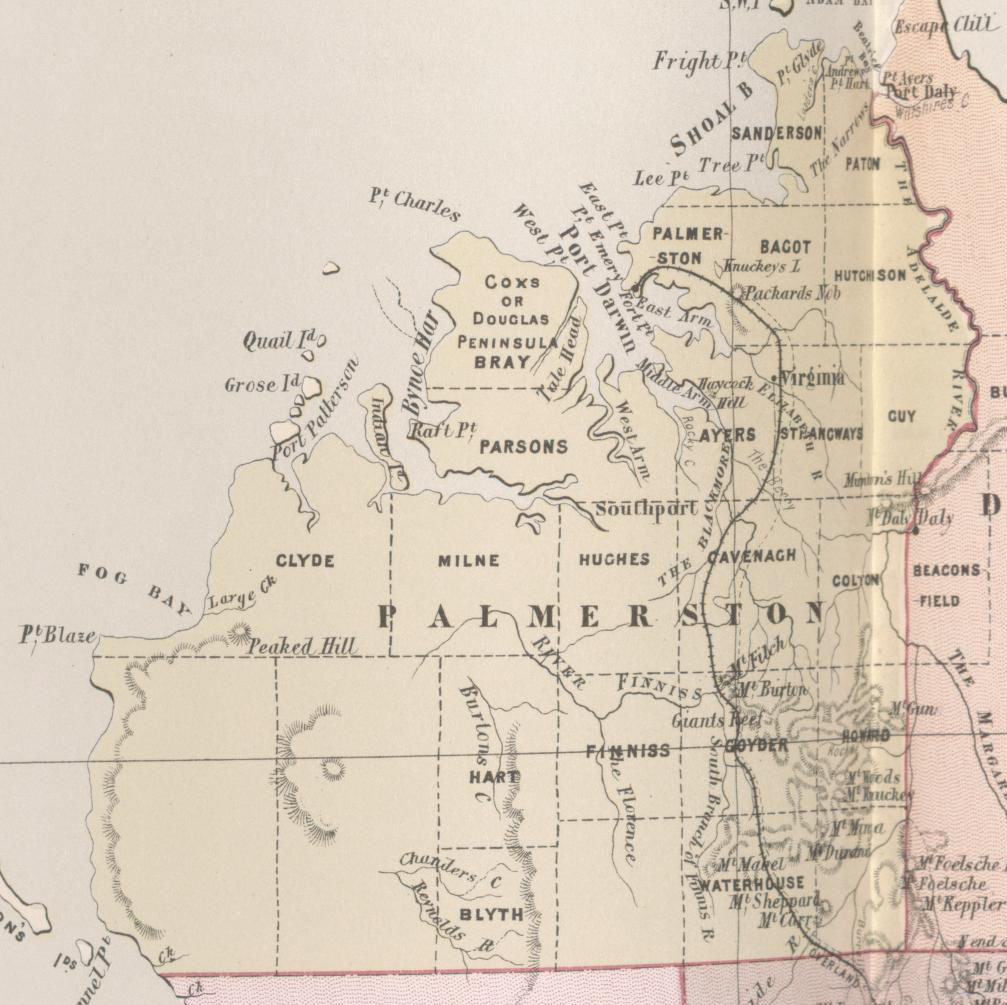
Map of Palmerston County (westerly adjacent to Disraeli) in 1886 showing the Hundred of Bundey on the east bank of the Adelaide River on the right edge of the map

The Hundred of Bundey (12°36′S 131°25′E) was a hundred within County of Disraeli in the Northern Territory of Australia. The hundred was gazetted on 7 August 1884 and lapsed with the passage in 1976 and the subsequent assent of the Crown Lands Ordinance 1976 (No. 1 of 1977) and the Crown Lands (Validation of Proclamations) Ordinance 1976 (No. 2 of 1977).

It is believed to have been named after William Henry Bundey (1838-1909) who was South Australian Attorney-General from 1878 to 1881 and the third judge of the Supreme Court of South Australia.

== See also ==
- Hundred of Bundey (South Australia)
