= Bill Bundy =

English footballer

Personal information
- Full name: William Bundy
- Date of birth: January qtr. 1883
- Place of birth: Eastleigh, England
- Date of death: 8 December 1945 (aged 62)
- Place of death: Eastleigh, England
- Position: Centre-forward

Youth career
- 1898–1902: Eastleigh Guild

Senior career*
| Years | Team | Apps | (Gls) |
| 1902–1904 | Southampton | 1 | (1) |
| 1904–1922 | Eastleigh Athletic | | |
- * Club domestic league appearances and goals

William Bundy (1883 – 8 December 1945) was an English footballer who played at centre-forward in one match for Southampton in the Southern League in 1903, before a long career with Eastleigh Athletic.

== Football career ==
Bundy was born in Eastleigh and played his youth football for the Eastleigh Guild before joining Southern League Southampton in September 1902. Having spent the start of his professional career in the reserves, he was promoted to the first team for the match against Reading on 14 February 1903, when regular forwards Tom Barlow, Joe Turner and Harry Wood were injured. Bundy acquitted himself well, scoring in a 4–1 victory (with Mark Bell scoring twice). Following the return of the injured players, Bundy made no further appearances, as the "Saints" claimed the Southern League title, with Reading runners-up, three points behind.

Bundy spent another half-season at The Dell before he left the club in January 1904 to join Eastleigh Athletic of the Hampshire League. He remained with the Eastleigh club until he retired in February 1922.
