= Joseph Curl =

American writer and political columnist

- Born: United States
- Occupations: Writer, columnist

Joseph Curl is an American writer and political columnist for The Washington Times, where he has published Right Read, a news aggregator, since 2015. From 2010 to 2014, Curl also worked for the Drudge Report, where he worked the morning shift. He now works for The Daily Wire.
