= Ammon Bundy =

American anti-government activist

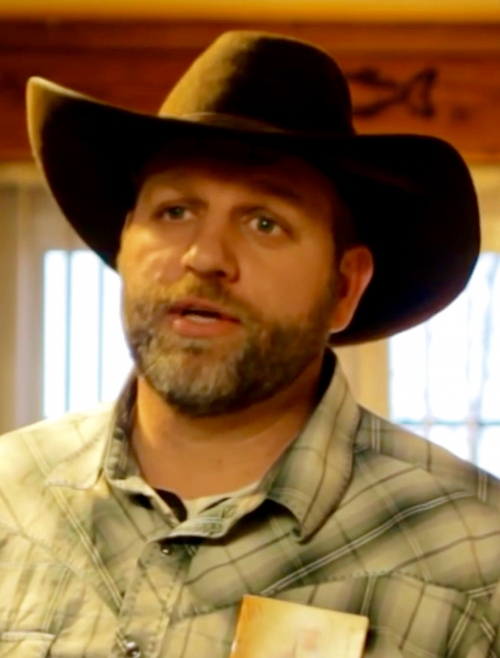
- Bundy in 2016
- Born: Ammon Edward Bundy; September 1, 1975 (age 51); Bunkerville, Nevada, U.S.
- Known for: Bundy standoff; Occupation of the Malheur National Wildlife Refuge
- Political party: Independent (since 2022); Republican (until 2022)
- Spouse: Lisa Bundy
- Children: 6
- Relatives: Cliven (father); Ryan (brother); Celeste Maloy (cousin)
- Website: AmmonBundy.com; VoteBundy.com

Ammon Edward Bundy (born September 1, 1975) is an American anti-government militant and activist who led the 2016 occupation of the Malheur National Wildlife Refuge in Oregon. During a traffic stop in October 2026, he verbalized sovereign citizen anti-law enforcement views. He is the son of rancher Cliven Bundy, who was the central figure in the 2014 Bundy standoff in Nevada regarding unpaid grazing fees on federal land.

In March 2020, Bundy created the People's Rights network. During the COVID-19 pandemic, Bundy was arrested more than five times for protests and disruptions against COVID-19 mitigation efforts by the Idaho government.

Bundy ran for governor of Idaho in the 2022 election. After initially filing to run in the Republican primary, he decided instead to run as an independent in the general election. Bundy lost the election, but his share of the vote was the strongest performance by a non-major party candidate for Idaho governor since 1926.

== 2014 Bundy standoff in Bunkerville ==
=== Standoff ===
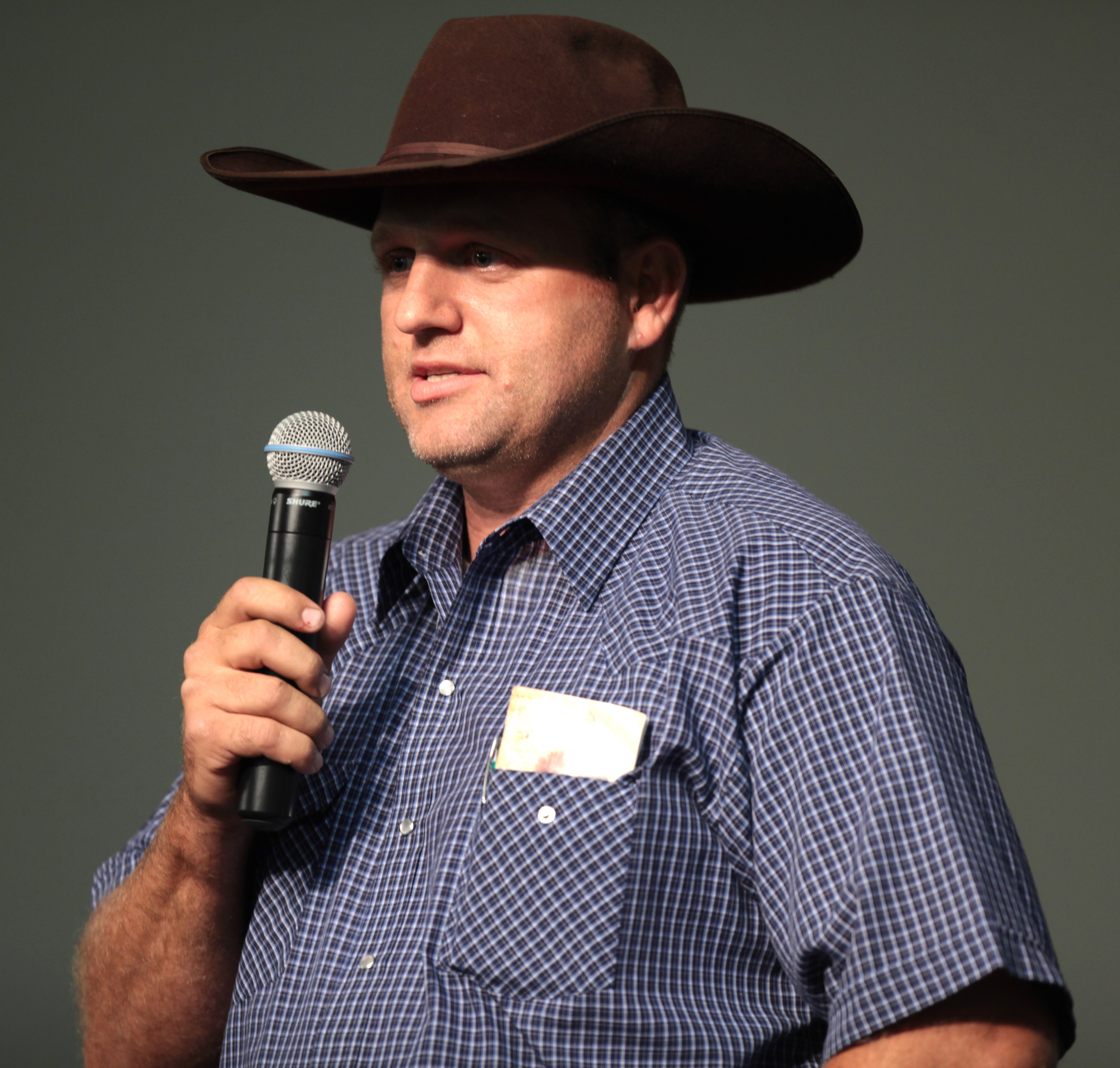
Bundy in 2014

On April 9, Bundy drove an all-terrain vehicle in front of a Bureau of Land Management (BLM) truck to block it from leaving. Officers told him to move his ATV, and he refused, yelling and approaching them belligerently. When two officers pointed tasers at him and ordered him to back up, Bundy continued to advance. An officer with a police dog approached to compel him to back away from the officers. He repeatedly kicked the police dog and was tasered moments later. After Bundy ripped off the taser wires and advanced toward the officers again, he was tasered a second time. He acknowledged in an interview that he had also climbed on a dump truck that he believed contained his father's cattle.

On or before April 10, Bundy asked the Oath Keepers to request that their volunteers who came to the protest follow certain rules. He asked that they not wear military camouflage and to leave their rifles in their vehicles rather than open carry them. He also asked that they check in with him when they arrived at the protest rally point. In addition, Bundy asked that they not drive past the rally point to the Bundy ranch. He also asked that no protester give a media interview, instead referring the media to Bundy family members, in particular him, his father, or one of his brothers.

On April 10, Cliven and Ammon were interviewed on-air by Fox News' Greta Van Susteren. Cliven said he would only accept a court order from a Nevada state court since he believed that a federal court does not have competent jurisdiction. To that, Ammon added, "If someone came in, busted into my house and abused my children, and so I call the cops, they don't respond, and then I take them to court. I show up at the courtroom, look on the stand, and it's the very person that abused my children looking down at me in a black robe. How in the world are we going to get justice in that court?"

On the morning of April 12, BLM had corralled about 400 of Cliven's cattle. Ammon and a group of protesters went to the makeshift impoundment site and formed a line across it. Bureau of Land Management agents called for backup but were outnumbered, with about 400 protesters to the 50 officers present at the scene. The officers ordered the crowd to disperse over a loudspeaker, but they would not. Instead, gunmen started to gather, causing the officers to retreat.

On April 14, Ammon, along with Cliven and his brother Ryan, were interviewed on-air by Fox News' Sean Hannity. Ammon said, "I'd [participate in the standoff] again, and after it was all over, I couldn't have felt better." Asked about remarks from Senator Harry Reid that the situation was not over, despite BLM's withdrawal from the standoff, Ammon responded, "Well, if he doesn't have enough moral fiber in his bones at all to see what happened, that 'We the People' got together and made something right, then I don't think there's any hope for him, and he needs to be kicked out of office, even if he is the Senate majority leader, it doesn't matter."

=== Prosecution ===
On February 7, 2016, Ammon Bundy—along with his father Cliven, brother Ryan, and others—were indicted in the U.S. District Court for the District of Nevada for their roles in the 2014 Bundy standoff. The men were charged with 16 felony counts: one count of "conspiracy to commit an offense against the United States"; one count of "conspiracy to impede or injure a federal officer"; four counts of "using and carrying a firearm in relation to a crime of violence"; two counts of "assault on a federal officer"; two counts of "threatening a federal law enforcement officer"; three counts of "obstruction of the due administration of justice"; two counts of "interference with interstate commerce by extortion"; and one count of "interstate travel in aid of extortion."

This prosecution is separate from the Malheur Refuge occupation prosecution in the U.S. District Court for the District of Oregon. In early April 2016, Judge Brown of the Oregonian prosecution approved an order to send the four defendants charged in both cases, including Ammon and Ryan Bundy, to Nevada to make an appearance in court there. The men were transported to Las Vegas by U.S. Marshals, and on April 16, 2016, Ammon Bundy and the four other militants refused to enter pleas in regards to their roles in the standoff, prompting U.S. Magistrate Judge George Foley Jr. to enter not-guilty pleas on their behalf. In the unusually long arraignment, Bundy asked for the 64-page indictment to be read aloud in court.

The trial for the Bundy standoff case was set for February 2017 in Nevada.

=== Mistrial and acquittal ===
On January 8, 2018, U.S. District Judge Gloria Navarro declared the mistrial to be with prejudice, effectively dismissing the charges, on the grounds that the defendants could not receive a fair trial. "The court finds that the universal sense of justice has been violated," the federal judge was quoted to have written in an order, as reported in the Los Angeles Times.

=== Appeal ===
In August 2020, the U.S. Court of Appeals for the Ninth Circuit in San Francisco denied an appeal by federal prosecutors to reinstate the criminal prosecution of the Bundys related to the 2014 armed standoff in Nevada and the 2016 armed protest and occupation of the Malheur National Wildlife Refuge in Oregon. The appeals court upheld the dismissal of the case agreeing with the trial court's finding that the prosecution improperly withheld documents requested by the defense. The court stopped short of affirming that prosecutorial misconduct had occurred and stated that "misjudgments" by prosecutors did not rise to professional misconduct in the case.

== 2016 militant occupation ==
=== Prelude to the occupation ===
In 2015, ranchers Dwight and Steve Hammond were resentenced to five years for two counts of arson on federal land, after their original sentence was vacated by the U.S. Court of Appeals for the Ninth Circuit. By late 2015, the Hammond case had attracted the attention of Ammon and his brother, Ryan Bundy. Although the ranchers rejected Bundy's assistance, Bundy decided to lead an armed occupation of the headquarters area of the Malheur National Wildlife Refuge on January 2, 2016. He referred to his group as the Citizens for Constitutional Freedom and remarked that it could be a lengthy stay.

=== Occupation ===
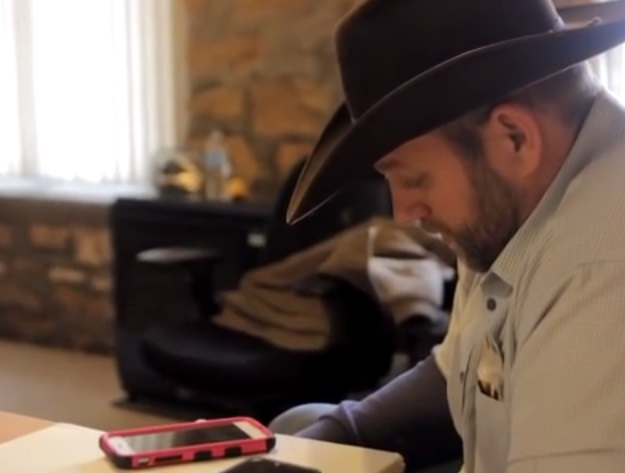
Bundy speaking to an FBI negotiator via speakerphone on January 21

Bundy's father Cliven said that he was not involved in the occupation, and that it was "not exactly what I thought should happen".

Early in the standoff, a Twitter user claiming to be Ammon Bundy tweeted a statement comparing the group to civil rights activist Rosa Parks. The account was later found to be a hoax. Despite this, other involved militants have made comparisons with Parks.

Speaking through his lawyer Mike Arnold the day after his arrest (see below), Bundy urged those remaining at the refuge to "please stand down" and go home.

=== Apprehension ===
Bundy was peacefully arrested on January 26, 2016, when the vehicle he was traveling in was pulled over by a joint force of FBI agents and troopers from Oregon State Patrol. He was with other militants from the occupation attempting to drive to John Day, Oregon for a public meeting where he was scheduled to speak. Another vehicle in the convoy fled the traffic stop until it encountered a roadblock, where Oregon State Patrol officers shot and killed LaVoy Finicum.

=== Pretrial proceedings and indictment ===
In January 2016, Bundy appeared before U.S. Magistrate Judge Stacie F. Beckerman alongside several other jailed militants. He explained the motives of the occupation to the court, saying that his "only goal from the beginning was to protect freedom for the people." Judge Beckerman denied him and the other militants pretrial release, explaining that she would not release them as long as the occupation continued. That same day, Bundy offered to plead guilty to the federal conspiracy charge alone, in exchange for the dismissal of the other charges against him, the dismissal of all of the charges filed against the other militants in custody at the time, and letting militants still at the refuge to leave peacefully without arrest. However, federal prosecutors rejected the offer. Bundy later repeatedly urged the militants remaining at the refuge to stand down and go home.

In interviews, Bundy said jail was the "most difficult thing I've ever done".

On March 8, 2016, the federal grand jury in Oregon returned a new superseding indictment that unsealed the following day, charging Bundy and 25 co-defendants with a variety of crimes in relation to the occupation. Bundy was charged with three offenses: conspiracy to impede officers of the United States by force, intimidation, or threats; possession of firearms and dangerous weapons in federal facilities; and using and carrying firearms in relation to a crime of violence.

Bundy's attorney, Mike Arnold of Eugene, Oregon, was accused of organizing a social media harassment campaign against the public agencies involved in evidence gathering and prosecution of the case, and in particular the Oregon State Police. The Southern Poverty Law Center reported that sovereign citizen movement members also attempted to insert themselves into the case, filing a flurry of paperwork in a tactic common to the movement known as paper terrorism. Arnold also faced ethics complaints regarding attempts to unduly influence the potential jury pool and for possible ethical violations involving visits by Arnold's law firm to Bundy and other militants prior to their arrests, offering legal services. The complaint was later dropped by the Oregon State Bar on the basis of insufficient evidence.

In May 2016, Bundy's legal team filed court papers seeking dismissal of the indictments on the ground that Bundy believed the occupation would result in a civil court taking up the constitutionality of the U.S. government's federal land management policy, and that Bundy did not expect the militants to be criminally charged. His lawyers wrote that Bundy believed that two U.S. Supreme Court cases, upholding the federal government's broad power over federal lands, were wrongfully decided. (Note: These were a 1935 ruling that the government has had ownership over the refuge's wetlands and lake-beds since the 1840s; and a following ruling that the country's laws have sole control over the disposition of title to its lands, and that the states have no power to establish limitations or restrictions over that control.) These motions were rejected by U.S. District Judge Anna J. Brown, citing longstanding Supreme Court precedent establishing the federal government's power to own and manage public land under the Property Clause as being "without limitations," and ruled that Bundy was "mistaken" in his belief that the existence of the wildlife refuge is unconstitutional.

On May 26, 2016, Bundy replaced his legal counsel, removing the Arnold Law Firm from the case and hiring J. Morgan Philpot as his lawyer. He also retained Utah attorney Marcus Mumford to assist Bundy.

On June 10, 2016, Judge Brown dismissed one of two firearms charges against Bundy and seven other militants, finding that the underlying conspiracy charge does not meet the legal definition of a "crime of violence" as defined by Ninth Circuit case law. In July 2016, the court denied the Bundy lawyers' request for a delay in his trial.

In September 2016, Ammon and Ryan Bundy (through Ammon's lawyers, Philpot and Marcus Mumford), filed a motion seeking to permit his client to wear "cowboy" attire in court. The U.S. Marshals Service's policy barred the defendants from wearing ties, boots, and belts, for safety reasons. Denying the motion on grounds that this policy is rational and that the Bundys did not show their attire would prejudice their case, Judge Brown said Ammon was "dressed better than most people in the building, period." On October 27, 2016, a jury acquitted seven of the defendants. Five of them were released but Ammon Bundy and his brother Ryan remained in federal custody pending trial on charges related to the 2014 Bundy standoff.

=== Trial and acquittal ===
Jury selection for Bundy's trial began on September 7, 2016. Judge Brown said the case would require an unusually large jury pool. Eleven of 31 potential jurors were excused for a variety of reasons, such as opinions regarding the occupation and also personal hardships. By September 9, 2016, 62 people were identified as potential jurors. Twelve jurors (consisting of eight women and four men) and eight alternates were selected by the end of the day. Opening statements were scheduled for September 13, 2016.

Eight other co-defendants in the occupation were also originally set for trial on that September 7, 2016, and a further nine co-defendants were set for trial beginning February 14, 2017.

In July 2016, with six weeks before the beginning of the first trial in the case, nine of Bundy's fellow militants pleaded guilty, including three of nine militants who were part of Bundy's "inner circle". Of those three, two were reported to be negotiating "a resolution to a federal indictment in Nevada as well" (see above). By August, the total number of militants pleading guilty had increased to eleven.

On October 27, 2016, Ammon Bundy was found not guilty on all counts.

== Post-occupation through Idaho gubernatorial election (2016–2022) ==
=== Statements on LDS church ===
Bundy also claimed that the federal government's prosecution of him and his supporters following confrontations in Nevada and Oregon is really a "battle of High priests" of the Church of Jesus Christ of Latter-day Saints (LDS Church). He said he, his father, and his attorney are all high priests in the church, as well as the lead U.S. attorney prosecuting his family, the chief judge in Oregon, and former Nevada Senator Harry Reid.

Bundy says he is an active and devout member of the LDS Church but claimed that it had been infiltrated by socialists.

Concerning the Oregon occupation, the church stated that "Church leaders strongly condemn the armed seizure of the facility and are deeply troubled by the reports that those who have seized the facility suggest that they are doing so based on scriptural principles."

=== Disavowal of militia movement ===
In December 2018, Bundy disavowed the militia movement due to his disagreement with President Donald Trump's immigration policy, specifically regarding the Central American migrant caravan. He said, "To group them all up like, frankly, our president has done — you know, trying to speak respectfully — but he has basically called them all criminals and said they're not coming in here. What about individuals, those who have come for reasons of need for their families, you know, the fathers and mothers and children that come here and were willing to go through the process to apply for asylum so they can come into this country and benefit from not having to be oppressed continually?" Bundy also said that nationalism does not equal patriotism and compared the modern-day U.S. to 1930s Nazi Germany. In 2018, Bundy compared Trump to Adolf Hitler.

=== Black Lives Matter movement ===
Bundy has expressed support for the Black Lives Matter, defund the police, and prison abolition movements. In July 2020, he said "you must have a problem in your mind if you think that somehow the Black Lives Matter is more dangerous than the police" and "there needs to be a defunding of government in general, and especially the police forces because they're the ones who are actually going to seek and destroy us."

=== People's Rights Network ===
In March 2020, Bundy founded an organization called the People's Rights Network. Bundy and the PRN claim that the organization is not "anti-government," but that "if it’s government trying to take the rights, we will have to unite against them." The Institute for Research and Education on Human Rights (IREHR) estimated the group's membership at approximately 33,000 in 2021; Bundy has claimed the group's membership to be above 60,000.

The PRN has been criticized for its ties to extremism and threats of violence. Counterterrorism Group evaluates the organization as a "domestic terrorism threat" with "high confidence." A report by IREHR and the Montana Human Rights Network detailed the formation of the group, including numerous ties to violent, anti-government and racial supremacist individuals both in affiliation and leadership, concluding that "it is Ammon’s Army, and it marches to a far-right drumbeat of narcissistic rage and insurrection," which involves "troubling displays of far-right conspiracism, racism, antisemitism, anti-indigenous and anti-transgender sentiment, and omnipresent threats of violence." IREHR analysis connects the group's political stances, generally based in overturning civil rights as "a broad-based, anti-Democratic and bigoted social movement," to pre-Civil War interpretations of the U.S. Constitution and Christian nationalism; the extremist Posse Comitatus; secessionist and violent right-wing militias such as the Proud Boys, Three Percenters, and Patriot Prayer; racist historical revisionists such as W. Cleon Skousen; various antisemitic conspiracy theories; bad-faith and convoluted denials of racism in the United States aimed at furthering white supremacy; and anti-indigenous bigotry.

In 2021, Bundy's group engaged in a standoff with the government over water usage from the Klamath River. Bundy's group occupied a segment of land next to a canal in the Klamath Basin near Klamath Falls, Oregon and threatened to unilaterally force the headgates open. River flows had been reduced to safeguard local endangered species considered sacred by the indigenous Klamath Tribes and ensure enough water for annual salmon migration; the local Klamath Water Users Association denounced the actions of Bundy's group. Members of PRN claimed the water was "not theirs", referring to the indigenous Klamath, and the Klamath viewed the PRN as "a threat" full of "white supremacy, militia, anti-government, extremist groups."

The Southern Poverty Law Center reported in May 2023 that a number of extremist organizations, including Bundy's PNM, received donations laundered through the cryptocurrency Ethereum to hide a donor's identity; PRN received approximately $93,000.

As of March 29, 2025 associate David Pettinger was reported as "a leader in" the organization.

==== COVID-19 protests ====
On March 26, 2020, Idaho's Governor Brad Little issued a stay-at-home order due to the 2020 coronavirus pandemic in Idaho. After the order, Bundy held a meeting at an industrial building in Emmett with "Bundy pledging to help provide legal, political and physical defense to people who are pressured by the "authorities" or anybody else to comply with the order."

On April 21, 2020 after anti-vaccination activist Sara Walton Brady was arrested for misdemeanor trespassing, Bundy and a group of 40 people stood outside the arresting police officer's home for 30 minutes.

On August 24, 2020 Ammon Bundy led a large number of maskless protesters at the Idaho State Capitol to protest the Idaho mandate that people in public are required to wear face masks in response to the COVID-19 pandemic. Bundy and the protesters with him disrupted an emergency legislative session which was considering legal immunity legislation related to the reopening of public schools in the State of Idaho.

On August 25, 2020 the speaker of the Idaho House of Representatives closed the auditorium at the State Capitol and ordered protesters to leave the building. Ammon Bundy and three others refused to leave when directed to do so by Idaho State Police Officers, and were arrested for criminal trespass. Bundy was also charged with resisting arrest and was wheeled out of the building handcuffed in a rolling chair.

On August 26, 2020 Bundy and a number of protesters returned to the State Capitol during the emergency legislative session. Ammon Bundy was served with a no-trespass letter directed to him from the Governor of Idaho, the Speaker of the Idaho House of Representatives, and a State Administrative official and told to leave the building. He again refused to leave and was arrested by Idaho State Police for criminal trespass and resisting arrest, and was taken out of the building handcuffed in a wheelchair.

On August 31, 2020 Bundy posted a one-hour video on YouTube explaining his version of the events that transpired at the Idaho State Capitol Building which led to his arrest following over two days of protest activities of the Idaho Legislature Special Session. Bundy claimed that he had the permission of the Speaker of the Idaho House of Representatives to be present at the special session and that he had been respectful of the legislative process, and peaceful at all times during the protests. Bundy also disavowed that he was the leader or organizer of the protests and that the protesters were very much acting on their own when they disrupted the emergency legislative session of the Idaho Legislature.

Bundy's trial for trespassing and resisting arrest charges ran from Monday, June 28, 2021 to Thursday, July 1, 2021. He was found guilty on all charges and sentenced to 48 hours community service in lieu of five days jailtime, and was required to pay a $500 fine plus court costs of $417.

Bundy attended a football game between Emmett and Caldwell High Schools on October 2, 2020; he refused to wear a mask and was denied entry. After attempting to watch the game from the parking lot, he was asked to leave but refused. The game was declared over at halftime due to threats made toward the school by those who had refused to wear masks.

On March 15, 2021 he was once again arrested after refusing to wear a face mask inside an Idaho courthouse and missing the court date for his offenses regarding the Idaho legislature protests.

On April 8, 2022, Bundy was convicted of trespassing and resisting arrest for refusing to leave a closed committee room at the statehouse. Since he did not appear at trial he was found guilty by default. He was sentenced to five days in jail, fined and ordered to do 40 hours of community service which could not include any work of use to himself. Instead he spent 40 hours working on his own gubernatorial campaign and submitted it. As a result the judge found him in contempt of court and sentenced him to ten days in jail and fined.

==== St. Luke's Hospital protest and defamation verdict ====
In March 2022, Bundy staged a protest at St. Luke's Boise, a hospital, where he and an associate Diego Rodriguez, demanded that Rodriguez's infant grandson—who had been found severely malnourished and put into protective care for several days—be returned. The baby boy, aged 10 months, was severely malnourished and had a distended stomach and hollow eyes; he was not able to sit up. At the protest at the hospital, Bundy was arrested for trespassing. He served 12 days in jail. After later pleading guilty to first-offense trespassing, the hospital's claim for 12 million dollars in damages was tentatively dropped. Bundy was then sentenced to 90 days in jail (with 78 days suspended) and one year of unsupervised probation, meaning that he did not have to serve any more time in jail.

=== 2022 Idaho gubernatorial election ===
On May 21, 2021, Bundy filed paperwork to run for governor in the state of Idaho in 2022. However, being his own campaign treasurer and not being a registered voter in the state, his paperwork was rejected. He had later claimed that while he did file treasurer appointment paperwork, he had not made up his mind regarding a gubernatorial run. On June 19, 2021, he announced a bid for the Republican nomination, indicating that his aims are to protect Idaho from "Joe Biden and those in the Deep State that control him," stating that they are attempting to eliminate freedom of religion, gun rights, and parental rights. Bundy's campaign aimed to eliminate property taxation and Idaho state income taxes. In an interview with Christian apologist and conservative podcaster C. Jay Cox, Bundy stated he was against any mandates on private businesses regarding masks, vaccines, or lockdowns, regardless of whether or not those mandates were for or against said policies. Bundy's electoral bid was endorsed by Trump advisor Roger Stone, despite Bundy's vocal opposition to Trump's immigration policies.

On February 17, 2022, Bundy dropped out of the Republican primary race, announcing that he would instead run as an independent candidate, saying that "The Republican Party platform is the platform I stand behind but the Republican establishment in Idaho is full of filth and corruption." He came in third in the November 2022, Idaho general election. Brad Little, the Republican incumbent, won reelection with 358,598 (60.52%) of the vote; Democratic challenger Stephen Heidt received 120,160 (20.28%), and Bundy received 101,835 votes (17.19%).

==== Electoral history ====
2022 Idaho gubernatorial election
Party	Candidate	Votes	%	±%
Republican	Brad Little (incumbent)	358,598	60.52%	+0.76%
Democratic	Stephen Heidt	120,160	20.28%	−17.91%
Independent	Ammon Bundy	101,835	17.19%	N/A
Libertarian	Paul Sand	6,714	1.13%	+0.05%
Constitution	Chantyrose Davison	5,250	0.89%	−0.07%
Total votes		592,557	100.0%	N/A
Republican hold				

== Post gubernatorial election (2022–current) ==
=== Refusal to compensate for damages per verdict of second trial ===
After serving his time for his trespassing convictions of 2022, Bundy called upon his followers to protest at the hospital (both St. Luke's Meridian and St. Luke's Boise), and at the homes of the child protection service workers and law enforcement officers involved. PRN members falsely claimed that the hospital had "kidnapped" the Rodriguez's grandson; they harassed the hospital online, through phones and in person, and some made death threats and doxxed hospital workers. Bundy also claimed that St. Luke's "engaged in widespread kidnapping, trafficking, and killing of Idaho children" and claimed that the Idaho government and others were engaged in "child trafficking" for profit.

In July 2023 St. Luke's Regional Health sued Bundy, Rodriquez, and three affiliated organizations (the Ammon Bundy for Governor, the People's Rights Network and the Freedom Man Press/Freedom Man PAC) in a civil trial for defamation, saying that the defendants had harassed medical staff and orchestrated a smear campaign against the hospital. In the defamation trial several medical professionals testified that the boy had been in dire need of medical care and, had he not been treated, would most likely have died.

According to the hospital, the actions of Bundy and the other defendants caused disruption to operations, with the hospital being forced to lock down the facility, divert emergency department patients, and postpone or cancel hundreds of appointments. At the trial, the hospital cited evidence that the defendants had spread lies about the hospital through videos and blog posts, such as claims that the hospital and government were plotting to seize children from Christian families and give them to gay couples to be sexually abused. Bundy refused to appear in court either personally or through legal counsel; after failing to respond to court orders, he was found in default.

Following the civil trial in Ada County, the jury found all defendants liable for defamation, false light, and intentional infliction of emotional distress. The jury awarded plaintiffs $26.5 million in compensatory damages and $26 million in punitive damages. Of this amount, Bundy personally was found liable for $6.2 million in compensatory damages and $6.15 million in punitive damages and Ammon Bundy for Governor was found liable for $1.55 million in compensatory damages and $1.65 million in punitive damages. The hospital system praised the jury verdict as "accountability for the ongoing campaign of intimidation, harassment and disinformation" conducted by Bundy and his co-defendants.

In September 2023, Bundy's civil trial was delayed to allow him time to complete fruit harvesting on his farm. At the same time, the judge ruled on a list of falsehoods that Bundy and his associates had made, ordering them to take down all existing social media posts and barring them from posting new ones:

- The infant was “perfectly healthy” when taken into custody.
- The infant was kidnapped or unlawfully taken.
- St. Luke’s and Idaho government agencies are involved in child trafficking.
- St. Luke’s medical providers are pedophiles.
- The Idaho Department of Health and Welfare makes more money from taking children into custody.
- The department “only allows certain people with a specific sexual orientation to adopt children.”
- St. Luke’s harmed or misdiagnosed the infant.
- St. Luke’s reported the parents to Child Protective Services.
- St. Luke’s staff threatened to file a report with Child Protective Services if the parents didn’t agree to a treatment plan.
- St. Luke’s both kept the infant longer than necessary and discriminated against the parents because they didn’t want him vaccinated.
- The parents didn’t consent to the infant’s treatment and owe thousands of dollars for the infant’s medical care.
- The infant was released quickly because of the protesters’ actions.
- The defendants must remove those and similar statements posted online already.

=== Refusal to remove defamation material from website ===
St. Luke's Hospital sued Bundy in May 2022, asking him to remove "defamatory and false material" which Bundy had posted about St. Luke's on one of his websites. By February 2023 Bundy had not yet removed any of the offensive materials from his website. As a result of Bundy's apparent tendency to defy court orders, the judge in that case later halted the sale of Bundy's home to his former campaign manager, ruling that the transaction was likely a fraudulent conveyance meant to illegally put the farm beyond reach of a creditor, placed strict limits on other financial transactions allowed to the Bundy family with a $5,750 per month allowance for living expenses, and ruled that Bundy "does in fact exercise control and influence over" the People's Rights Network group and website.

The judge cited numerous irregularities in the sale of the home to Aaron Welling's White Barn Enterprises, including the fact that no money was paid to Bundy for the "sale," that White Barn assigned all the money from Bundy's rent payments into existing mortgage payments on the property after taking over the mortgage, and that Bundy had made public statements prior to the sale indicating that he was making efforts to put his assets beyond the reach of a court judgement. After missing multiple deadlines and filing paperwork inappropriately with wrong offices or without appropriate cover pages and fees, the judge in the case ruled Bundy in default under Idaho Rule of Civil Procedure 55.

=== Idaho arrest warrant issuance ===
As of November 2023 an arrest warrant with a $250,000.00 bond was issued against Bundy for contempt of court due to his refusal to appear at his trial. After the warrant was issued, it was reported that Bundy and his family had abandoned their Idaho home and were in hiding somewhere in southern Utah. White Barn transferred ownership of the property to St. Luke's, according to papers filed in December 2023. From his hideout, Bundy has issued veiled threats to the St. Luke's hospital staff, to his bank tellers, to some of his far right wing supporters, and also to the "Freedom Movement" which had previously voiced its support for Bundy.

Regarding the videos which Bundy once claimed proved his assertions regarding "Baby Cyrus," fact checks from multiple news outlets including MSN and The Idaho Statesman determined that Bundy had posted dishonestly edited videos in his social media attacks against St. Luke's and its employees.

=== Bankruptcy ===
In an attempt to avoid paying the money he owed to St. Luke's, Bundy filed for bankruptcy in 2024. This procedure can result in the discharge of debts, including judgments. In August 2025, however, the bankruptcy judge in Utah ruled that Bundy's debt to St. Luke's could not be discharged. The bankruptcy statute, 11 U.S. Code § 523, excludes from discharge any debt "for willful and malicious injury by the debtor to another entity...."

=== 2026 arrest ===
In October 2026 Ammon Bundy was arrested for driving without registration.

== Personal life ==
Bundy owns a truck repair company and was listed as a member of several Arizona companies. Prior to the occupation of the Malheur National Wildlife Refuge, he had lost a home in a short sale and was behind on his property taxes.

Bundy and his wife, Lisa, have three daughters and three sons. They owned a 5,102 square feet (474 m^{2}) home in Emmett until it was subsequently seized by the Idaho State Courts and transferred to the plaintiffs related to a litigation with St. Luke's Hospital in Idaho. His cousin is Representative Celeste Maloy from Utah's 2nd congressional district.
