= Bundy: An American Icon =

2009 film

- Directed by: Michael Feifer
- Written by: Michael Feifer
- Starring: Corin Nemec; Kane Hodder; Jen Nikolaisen
- Music by: Andres Boulton
- Production company: Barnholtz Entertainment
- Release date: 2009
- Running time: 96 minutes
- Country: United States
- Language: English

Bundy: An American Icon (also known as Bundy: A Legacy of Evil) is a 2009 American direct-to-video horror thriller film written and directed by Michael Feifer, based on the criminal career of serial killer Ted Bundy. The film stars Corin Nemec as Bundy, alongside Kane Hodder and Jen Nikolaisen.

== Plot ==
The film opens with Ted Bundy on death row awaiting execution after his final appeal has been denied. As he reflects on his life, the story flashes back to his childhood, where he grows up in a troubled and abusive household. As a young man, Bundy attends college and begins a relationship with an older student named Stephanie. Their relationship deteriorates, and Stephanie eventually leaves him, considering him immature and lacking direction.

Ted Bundy sits on death row awaiting execution after his final appeal has been denied and reflects on his life. The story flashes back to his troubled childhood and later follows him as a young man attending college. In 1966, he begins a relationship with an older student named Stephanie. Their relationship becomes strained, and Stephanie eventually leaves him, believing him to be immature and lacking direction.

Bundy later discovers that he was born out of wedlock and that the woman he had believed to be his sister is actually his mother. His behavior becomes increasingly violent, and he attacks and murders a young woman. After completing his studies, Bundy moves to Seattle, where he works at a telephone crisis center counseling people contemplating suicide. While presenting himself as an intelligent and successful young man, he begins targeting women, using deception to gain their trust before abducting and murdering them.

As Bundy’s killings continue, law enforcement begins pursuing him. He uses different identities and disguises and travels between states in an attempt to avoid capture. He is eventually arrested in Colorado but escapes from custody. After being recaptured, Bundy escapes a second time and flees to Florida.

In Florida, Bundy resumes killing and attacks women at the Chi Omega sorority house. He is eventually apprehended and brought to trial, where he participates in his own defense. Bundy is convicted and sentenced to death. The film returns to Bundy on death row, where he awaits his execution in the electric chair.

== Cast ==
- Corin Nemec as Ted Bundy
- Kane Hodder as Warden
- Jen Nikolaisen as Stephanie
- Shannon Pierce Wilkins as Mrs. Bundy
- David DeLuise as Detective Jennings
- Jay Pickett as Ross Davis

== Critical response ==
Dread Central's Scott Foy gave the film a score of two out of five, likening it to a reenactment segment of an episode of America's Most Wanted; he criticized Feifer's writing and direction, and wrote that Nemec "gives it his all but always looks entirely too old for the role, laughably so during the scenes portraying Bundy during his high school and early college years." Tyler Foster of DVD Talk characterized Nemec's performance as "wildly uneven", and wrote that, "With a little more verve, [the film] might have been entertaining in a late-night-cable kind of way, but it ends up being a meandering waste."
