= Oregon's congressional delegations =

These are tables of congressional delegations from Oregon to the United States Senate and United States House of Representatives.

The current Oregon delegation consists of six congresspersons and two senators serving in the 119th United States Congress. The dean of the current delegation is Senator Ron Wyden, having served in the Senate since 1996 and in Congress since 1981.

== United States Senate ==
Current U.S. senators from Oregon
Oregon CPVI (2025): D+8	Class II senator	Class III senator
Oregon CPVI (2025): D+8	Jeff Merkley (Junior senator) (Portland)	Ron Wyden (Senior senator) (Portland)
Party	Democratic	Democratic
Incumbent since	January 3, 2009	February 5, 1996

Class II senator	Congress	Class III senator
Delazon Smith (D)	35th (1859)	Joseph Lane (D)
vacant	36th (1859–1861)	Joseph Lane (D)
Edward Baker (R)	36th (1859–1861)	Joseph Lane (D)
Edward Baker (R)	37th (1861–1863)	James Nesmith (D)
Benjamin Stark (D)	37th (1861–1863)	James Nesmith (D)
Benjamin F. Harding (D)	37th (1861–1863)	James Nesmith (D)
Benjamin F. Harding (D)	38th (1863–1865)	James Nesmith (D)
George Williams (R)	39th (1865–1867)	James Nesmith (D)
George Williams (R)	40th (1867–1869)	Henry W. Corbett (R)
George Williams (R)	41st (1869–1871)	Henry W. Corbett (R)
James K. Kelly (D)	42nd (1871–1873)	Henry W. Corbett (R)
James K. Kelly (D)	43rd (1873–1875)	John H. Mitchell (R)
James K. Kelly (D)	44th (1875–1877)	John H. Mitchell (R)
La Fayette Grover (D)	45th (1877–1879)	John H. Mitchell (R)
La Fayette Grover (D)	46th (1879–1881)	James H. Slater (D)
La Fayette Grover (D)	47th (1881–1883)	James H. Slater (D)
Joseph N. Dolph (R)	48th (1883–1885)	James H. Slater (D)
Joseph N. Dolph (R)	49th (1885–1887)	vacant
Joseph N. Dolph (R)	49th (1885–1887)	John H. Mitchell (R)
Joseph N. Dolph (R)	50th (1887–1889)	John H. Mitchell (R)
Joseph N. Dolph (R)	51st (1889–1891)	John H. Mitchell (R)
Joseph N. Dolph (R)	52nd (1891–1893)	John H. Mitchell (R)
Joseph N. Dolph (R)	53rd (1893–1895)	John H. Mitchell (R)
George W. McBride (R)	54th (1895–1897)	John H. Mitchell (R)
George W. McBride (R)	55th (1897–1899)	vacant
George W. McBride (R)	55th (1897–1899)	Joseph Simon (R)
George W. McBride (R)	56th (1899–1901)	Joseph Simon (R)
John H. Mitchell (R)	57th (1901–1903)	Joseph Simon (R)
John H. Mitchell (R)	58th (1903–1905)	Charles W. Fulton (R)
John H. Mitchell (R)	59th (1905–1907)	Charles W. Fulton (R)
John M. Gearin (D)	59th (1905–1907)	Charles W. Fulton (R)
Frederick W. Mulkey (R)	59th (1905–1907)	Charles W. Fulton (R)
Jonathan Bourne Jr. (R)	60th (1907–1909)	Charles W. Fulton (R)
Jonathan Bourne Jr. (R)	61st (1909–1911)	George E. Chamberlain (D)
Jonathan Bourne Jr. (R)	62nd (1911–1913)	George E. Chamberlain (D)
Harry Lane (D)	63rd (1913–1915)	George E. Chamberlain (D)
Harry Lane (D)	64th (1915–1917)	George E. Chamberlain (D)
Harry Lane (D)	65th (1917–1919)	George E. Chamberlain (D)
Charles L. McNary (R)	65th (1917–1919)	George E. Chamberlain (D)
Frederick W. Mulkey (R)	65th (1917–1919)	George E. Chamberlain (D)
Charles L. McNary (R)	65th (1917–1919)	George E. Chamberlain (D)
Charles L. McNary (R)	66th (1919–1921)	George E. Chamberlain (D)
Charles L. McNary (R)	67th (1921–1923)	Robert N. Stanfield (R)
Charles L. McNary (R)	68th (1923–1925)	Robert N. Stanfield (R)
Charles L. McNary (R)	69th (1925–1927)	Robert N. Stanfield (R)
Charles L. McNary (R)	70th (1927–1929)	Frederick Steiwer (R)
Charles L. McNary (R)	71st (1929–1931)	Frederick Steiwer (R)
Charles L. McNary (R)	72nd (1931–1933)	Frederick Steiwer (R)
Charles L. McNary (R)	73rd (1933–1935)	Frederick Steiwer (R)
Charles L. McNary (R)	74th (1935–1937)	Frederick Steiwer (R)
Charles L. McNary (R)	75th (1937–1939)	Frederick Steiwer (R)
Charles L. McNary (R)	75th (1937–1939)	Alfred E. Reames (D)
Charles L. McNary (R)	75th (1937–1939)	Alexander G. Barry (R)
Charles L. McNary (R)	76th (1939–1941)	Rufus C. Holman (R)
Charles L. McNary (R)	77th (1941–1943)	Rufus C. Holman (R)
Charles L. McNary (R)	78th (1943–1945)	Rufus C. Holman (R)
Guy Cordon (R)	78th (1943–1945)	Rufus C. Holman (R)
Guy Cordon (R)	79th (1945–1947)	Wayne Morse (R)
Guy Cordon (R)	80th (1947–1949)	Wayne Morse (R)
Guy Cordon (R)	81st (1949–1951)	Wayne Morse (R)
Guy Cordon (R)	82nd (1951–1953)	Wayne Morse (R)
Guy Cordon (R)	82nd (1951–1953)	Wayne Morse (I)
Guy Cordon (R)	83rd (1953–1955)	Wayne Morse (I)
Richard L. Neuberger (D)	84th (1955–1957)	Wayne Morse (D)
Richard L. Neuberger (D)	85th (1957–1959)	Wayne Morse (D)
Richard L. Neuberger (D)	86th (1959–1961)	Wayne Morse (D)
Hall S. Lusk (D)	86th (1959–1961)	Wayne Morse (D)
Maurine Neuberger (D)	86th (1959–1961)	Wayne Morse (D)
Maurine Neuberger (D)	87th (1961–1963)	Wayne Morse (D)
Maurine Neuberger (D)	88th (1963–1965)	Wayne Morse (D)
Maurine Neuberger (D)	89th (1965–1967)	Wayne Morse (D)
Mark Hatfield (R)	90th (1967–1969)	Wayne Morse (D)
Mark Hatfield (R)	91st (1969–1971)	Bob Packwood (R)
Mark Hatfield (R)	92nd (1971–1973)	Bob Packwood (R)
Mark Hatfield (R)	93rd (1973–1975)	Bob Packwood (R)
Mark Hatfield (R)	94th (1975–1977)	Bob Packwood (R)
Mark Hatfield (R)	95th (1977–1979)	Bob Packwood (R)
Mark Hatfield (R)	96th (1979–1981)	Bob Packwood (R)
Mark Hatfield (R)	97th (1981–1983)	Bob Packwood (R)
Mark Hatfield (R)	98th (1983–1985)	Bob Packwood (R)
Mark Hatfield (R)	99th (1985–1987)	Bob Packwood (R)
Mark Hatfield (R)	100th (1987–1989)	Bob Packwood (R)
Mark Hatfield (R)	101st (1989–1991)	Bob Packwood (R)
Mark Hatfield (R)	102nd (1991–1993)	Bob Packwood (R)
Mark Hatfield (R)	103rd (1993–1995)	Bob Packwood (R)
Mark Hatfield (R)	104th (1995–1997)	Bob Packwood (R)
Mark Hatfield (R)	104th (1995–1997)	Ron Wyden (D)
Gordon H. Smith (R)	105th (1997–1999)	Ron Wyden (D)
Gordon H. Smith (R)	106th (1999–2001)	Ron Wyden (D)
Gordon H. Smith (R)	107th (2001–2003)	Ron Wyden (D)
Gordon H. Smith (R)	108th (2003–2005)	Ron Wyden (D)
Gordon H. Smith (R)	109th (2005–2007)	Ron Wyden (D)
Gordon H. Smith (R)	110th (2007–2009)	Ron Wyden (D)
Jeff Merkley (D)	111th (2009–2011)	Ron Wyden (D)
Jeff Merkley (D)	112th (2011–2013)	Ron Wyden (D)
Jeff Merkley (D)	113th (2013–2015)	Ron Wyden (D)
Jeff Merkley (D)	114th (2015–2017)	Ron Wyden (D)
Jeff Merkley (D)	115th (2017–2019)	Ron Wyden (D)
Jeff Merkley (D)	116th (2019–2021)	Ron Wyden (D)
Jeff Merkley (D)	117th (2021–2023)	Ron Wyden (D)
Jeff Merkley (D)	118th (2023–2025)	Ron Wyden (D)
Jeff Merkley (D)	119th (2025–2027)	Ron Wyden (D)
Jeff Merkley (D)	120th (2027–2029)	Ron Wyden (D)

== U.S. House of Representatives ==
=== Current representatives ===
Current U.S. representatives from Oregon
District	Member (Residence)	Party	Incumbent since	CPVI (2025)	District map
1st	Suzanne Bonamici (Beaverton)	Democratic	January 31, 2012	D+20	
2nd	Cliff Bentz (Ontario)	Republican	January 3, 2021	R+14	
3rd	Maxine Dexter (Portland)	Democratic	January 3, 2025	D+24	
4th	Val Hoyle (Springfield)	Democratic	January 3, 2023	D+6	
5th	Janelle Bynum (Happy Valley)	Democratic	January 3, 2025	D+4	
6th	Andrea Salinas (Tigard)	Democratic	January 3, 2023	D+6	

=== 1849–1859: one non-voting delegate ===
Congress	Delegate
31st (1849–1851)	Samuel Thurston (D)
32nd (1851–1853)	Joseph Lane (D)
33rd (1853–1855)	Joseph Lane (D)
34th (1855–1857)	Joseph Lane (D)
35th (1857–1859)	Joseph Lane (D)

=== 1859–1893: one seat ===
After statehood on February 14, 1859, Oregon had one seat, elected at-large statewide.

Congress	At-large representative
35th (1859)	La Fayette Grover (D)
36th (1859–1861)	Lansing Stout (D)
37th (1861–1863)	Andrew J. Thayer (D)
37th (1861–1863)	George K. Shiel (D)
38th (1863–1865)	John R. McBride (R)
39th (1865–1867)	James H. D. Henderson (R)
40th (1867–1869)	Rufus Mallory (R)
41st (1869–1871)	Joseph Showalter Smith (D)
42nd (1871–1873)	James H. Slater (D)
43rd (1873–1875)	Joseph G. Wilson (R)
43rd (1873–1875)	James Nesmith (D)
44th (1875–1877)	George A. La Dow (D)
44th (1875–1877)	Lafayette Lane (D)
45th (1877–1879)	Richard Williams (R)
46th (1879–1881)	John Whiteaker (D)
47th (1881–1883)	Melvin Clark George (R)
48th (1883–1885)	Melvin Clark George (R)
49th (1885–1887)	Binger Hermann (R)
50th (1887–1889)	Binger Hermann (R)
51st (1889–1891)	Binger Hermann (R)
52nd (1891–1893)	Binger Hermann (R)

=== 1893–present: multiple seats ===
Congress	1st district	2nd district	3rd district	4th district	5th district	6th district
53rd (1893–1895)	Binger Hermann (R)	William R. Ellis (R)				
54th (1895–1897)	Binger Hermann (R)	William R. Ellis (R)				
55th (1897–1899)	Thomas H. Tongue (R)	William R. Ellis (R)				
56th (1899–1901)	Thomas H. Tongue (R)	Malcolm A. Moody (R)				
57th (1901–1903)	Thomas H. Tongue (R)	Malcolm A. Moody (R)				
58th (1903–1905)	Thomas H. Tongue (R)	John N. Williamson (R)				
58th (1903–1905)	Binger Hermann (R)	John N. Williamson (R)				
59th (1905–1907)	Binger Hermann (R)	John N. Williamson (R)				
60th (1907–1909)	Willis C. Hawley (R)	William R. Ellis (R)				
61st (1909–1911)	Willis C. Hawley (R)	William R. Ellis (R)				
62nd (1911–1913)	Willis C. Hawley (R)	Walter Lafferty (R)				
63rd (1913–1915)	Willis C. Hawley (R)	Nicholas J. Sinnott (R)	Walter Lafferty (R)			
64th (1915–1917)	Willis C. Hawley (R)	Nicholas J. Sinnott (R)	Clifton N. McArthur (R)			
65th (1917–1919)	Willis C. Hawley (R)	Nicholas J. Sinnott (R)	Clifton N. McArthur (R)			
66th (1919–1921)	Willis C. Hawley (R)	Nicholas J. Sinnott (R)	Clifton N. McArthur (R)			
67th (1921–1923)	Willis C. Hawley (R)	Nicholas J. Sinnott (R)	Clifton N. McArthur (R)			
68th (1923–1925)	Willis C. Hawley (R)	Nicholas J. Sinnott (R)	Elton Watkins (D)			
69th (1925–1927)	Willis C. Hawley (R)	Nicholas J. Sinnott (R)	Maurice E. Crumpacker (R)			
70th (1927–1929)	Willis C. Hawley (R)	Nicholas J. Sinnott (R)	Maurice E. Crumpacker (R)			
70th (1927–1929)	Willis C. Hawley (R)	Robert R. Butler (R)	Franklin F. Korell (R)			
71st (1929–1931)	Willis C. Hawley (R)	Robert R. Butler (R)	Franklin F. Korell (R)			
72nd (1931–1933)	Willis C. Hawley (R)	Robert R. Butler (R)	Charles Martin (D)			
73rd (1933–1935)	James W. Mott (R)	Walter M. Pierce (D)	Charles Martin (D)			
74th (1935–1937)	James W. Mott (R)	Walter M. Pierce (D)	William A. Ekwall (R)			
75th (1937–1939)	James W. Mott (R)	Walter M. Pierce (D)	Nan Wood Honeyman (D)			
76th (1939–1941)	James W. Mott (R)	Walter M. Pierce (D)	Homer D. Angell (R)			
77th (1941–1943)	James W. Mott (R)	Walter M. Pierce (D)	Homer D. Angell (R)			
78th (1943–1945)	James W. Mott (R)	Lowell Stockman (R)	Homer D. Angell (R)	Harris Ellsworth (R)		
79th (1945–1947)	James W. Mott (R)	Lowell Stockman (R)	Homer D. Angell (R)	Harris Ellsworth (R)		
79th (1945–1947)	A. Walter Norblad (R)	Lowell Stockman (R)	Homer D. Angell (R)	Harris Ellsworth (R)		
80th (1947–1949)	A. Walter Norblad (R)	Lowell Stockman (R)	Homer D. Angell (R)	Harris Ellsworth (R)		
81st (1949–1951)	A. Walter Norblad (R)	Lowell Stockman (R)	Homer D. Angell (R)	Harris Ellsworth (R)		
82nd (1951–1953)	A. Walter Norblad (R)	Lowell Stockman (R)	Homer D. Angell (R)	Harris Ellsworth (R)		
83rd (1953–1955)	A. Walter Norblad (R)	Sam Coon (R)	Homer D. Angell (R)	Harris Ellsworth (R)		
84th (1955–1957)	A. Walter Norblad (R)	Sam Coon (R)	Edith Green (D)	Harris Ellsworth (R)		
85th (1957–1959)	A. Walter Norblad (R)	Al Ullman (D)	Edith Green (D)	Charles O. Porter (D)		
86th (1959–1961)	A. Walter Norblad (R)	Al Ullman (D)	Edith Green (D)	Charles O. Porter (D)		
87th (1961–1963)	A. Walter Norblad (R)	Al Ullman (D)	Edith Green (D)	Edwin Durno (R)		
88th (1963–1965)	A. Walter Norblad (R)	Al Ullman (D)	Edith Green (D)	Robert B. Duncan (D)		
88th (1963–1965)	Wendell Wyatt (R)	Al Ullman (D)	Edith Green (D)	Robert B. Duncan (D)		
89th (1965–1967)	Wendell Wyatt (R)	Al Ullman (D)	Edith Green (D)	Robert B. Duncan (D)		
90th (1967–1969)	Wendell Wyatt (R)	Al Ullman (D)	Edith Green (D)	John R. Dellenback (R)		
91st (1969–1971)	Wendell Wyatt (R)	Al Ullman (D)	Edith Green (D)	John R. Dellenback (R)		
92nd (1971–1973)	Wendell Wyatt (R)	Al Ullman (D)	Edith Green (D)	John R. Dellenback (R)		
93rd (1973–1975)	Wendell Wyatt (R)	Al Ullman (D)	Edith Green (D)	John R. Dellenback (R)		
94th (1975–1977)	Les AuCoin (D)	Al Ullman (D)	Robert B. Duncan (D)	Jim Weaver (D)		
95th (1977–1979)	Les AuCoin (D)	Al Ullman (D)	Robert B. Duncan (D)	Jim Weaver (D)		
96th (1979–1981)	Les AuCoin (D)	Al Ullman (D)	Robert B. Duncan (D)	Jim Weaver (D)		
97th (1981–1983)	Les AuCoin (D)	Denny Smith (R)	Ron Wyden (D)	Jim Weaver (D)		
98th (1983–1985)	Les AuCoin (D)	Bob Smith (R)	Ron Wyden (D)	Jim Weaver (D)	Denny Smith (R)	
99th (1985–1987)	Les AuCoin (D)	Bob Smith (R)	Ron Wyden (D)	Jim Weaver (D)	Denny Smith (R)	
100th (1987–1989)	Les AuCoin (D)	Bob Smith (R)	Ron Wyden (D)	Peter DeFazio (D)	Denny Smith (R)	
101st (1989–1991)	Les AuCoin (D)	Bob Smith (R)	Ron Wyden (D)	Peter DeFazio (D)	Denny Smith (R)	
102nd (1991–1993)	Les AuCoin (D)	Bob Smith (R)	Ron Wyden (D)	Peter DeFazio (D)	Mike Kopetski (D)	
103rd (1993–1995)	Elizabeth Furse (D)	Bob Smith (R)	Ron Wyden (D)	Peter DeFazio (D)	Mike Kopetski (D)	
104th (1995–1997)	Elizabeth Furse (D)	Wes Cooley (R)	Ron Wyden (D)	Peter DeFazio (D)	Jim Bunn (R)	
104th (1995–1997)	Elizabeth Furse (D)	Wes Cooley (R)	Earl; Blumenauer (D)	Peter DeFazio (D)	Jim Bunn (R)	
105th (1997–1999)	Elizabeth Furse (D)	Bob Smith (R)	Earl; Blumenauer (D)	Peter DeFazio (D)	Darlene Hooley (D)	
106th (1999–2001)	David Wu (D)	Greg Walden (R)	Earl; Blumenauer (D)	Peter DeFazio (D)	Darlene Hooley (D)	
107th (2001–2003)	David Wu (D)	Greg Walden (R)	Earl; Blumenauer (D)	Peter DeFazio (D)	Darlene Hooley (D)	
108th (2003–2005)	David Wu (D)	Greg Walden (R)	Earl; Blumenauer (D)	Peter DeFazio (D)	Darlene Hooley (D)	
109th (2005–2007)	David Wu (D)	Greg Walden (R)	Earl; Blumenauer (D)	Peter DeFazio (D)	Darlene Hooley (D)	
110th (2007–2009)	David Wu (D)	Greg Walden (R)	Earl; Blumenauer (D)	Peter DeFazio (D)	Darlene Hooley (D)	
111th (2009–2011)	David Wu (D)	Greg Walden (R)	Earl; Blumenauer (D)	Peter DeFazio (D)	Kurt Schrader (D)	
112th (2011–2013)	David Wu (D)	Greg Walden (R)	Earl; Blumenauer (D)	Peter DeFazio (D)	Kurt Schrader (D)	
112th (2011–2013)	Suzanne; Bonamici (D)	Greg Walden (R)	Earl; Blumenauer (D)	Peter DeFazio (D)	Kurt Schrader (D)	
113th (2013–2015)	Suzanne; Bonamici (D)	Greg Walden (R)	Earl; Blumenauer (D)	Peter DeFazio (D)	Kurt Schrader (D)	
114th (2015–2017)	Suzanne; Bonamici (D)	Greg Walden (R)	Earl; Blumenauer (D)	Peter DeFazio (D)	Kurt Schrader (D)	
115th (2017–2019)	Suzanne; Bonamici (D)	Greg Walden (R)	Earl; Blumenauer (D)	Peter DeFazio (D)	Kurt Schrader (D)	
116th (2019–2021)	Suzanne; Bonamici (D)	Greg Walden (R)	Earl; Blumenauer (D)	Peter DeFazio (D)	Kurt Schrader (D)	
117th (2021–2023)	Suzanne; Bonamici (D)	Cliff Bentz (R)	Earl; Blumenauer (D)	Peter DeFazio (D)	Kurt Schrader (D)	
118th (2023–2025)	Suzanne; Bonamici (D)	Cliff Bentz (R)	Earl; Blumenauer (D)	Val Hoyle (D)	Lori Chavez-DeRemer (R)	Andrea Salinas (D)
119th (2025–2027)	Suzanne; Bonamici (D)	Cliff Bentz (R)	Maxine Dexter (D)	Val Hoyle (D)	Janelle Bynum (D)	Andrea Salinas (D)
120th (2027–2029)	Suzanne; Bonamici (D)	Cliff Bentz (R)	Maxine Dexter (D)	Val Hoyle (D)	Janelle Bynum (D)	Andrea Salinas (D)

== Key ==
Democratic (D)
Republican (R)
Independent (I)

== See also ==
- List of United States congressional districts
- Oregon's congressional districts
- Political party strength in Oregon
