= List of United States representatives from Oregon =

The following is an alphabetical list of United States representatives from the state of Oregon. For chronological tables of members of both houses of the United States Congress from the state (through the present day), see Oregon's congressional delegations. The list of names is complete, but other data may be incomplete. It includes members who have represented both the state and the territory, both past and present.

== Current members ==
Updated January 3, 2025.

- 1st district: Suzanne Bonamici (D) (since 2012)
- 2nd district: Cliff Bentz (R) (since 2021)
- 3rd district: Maxine Dexter (D) (since 2025)
- 4th district: Val Hoyle (D) (since 2023)
- 5th district: Janelle Bynum (D) (since 2025)
- 6th district: Andrea Salinas (D) (since 2023)

== List of representatives ==
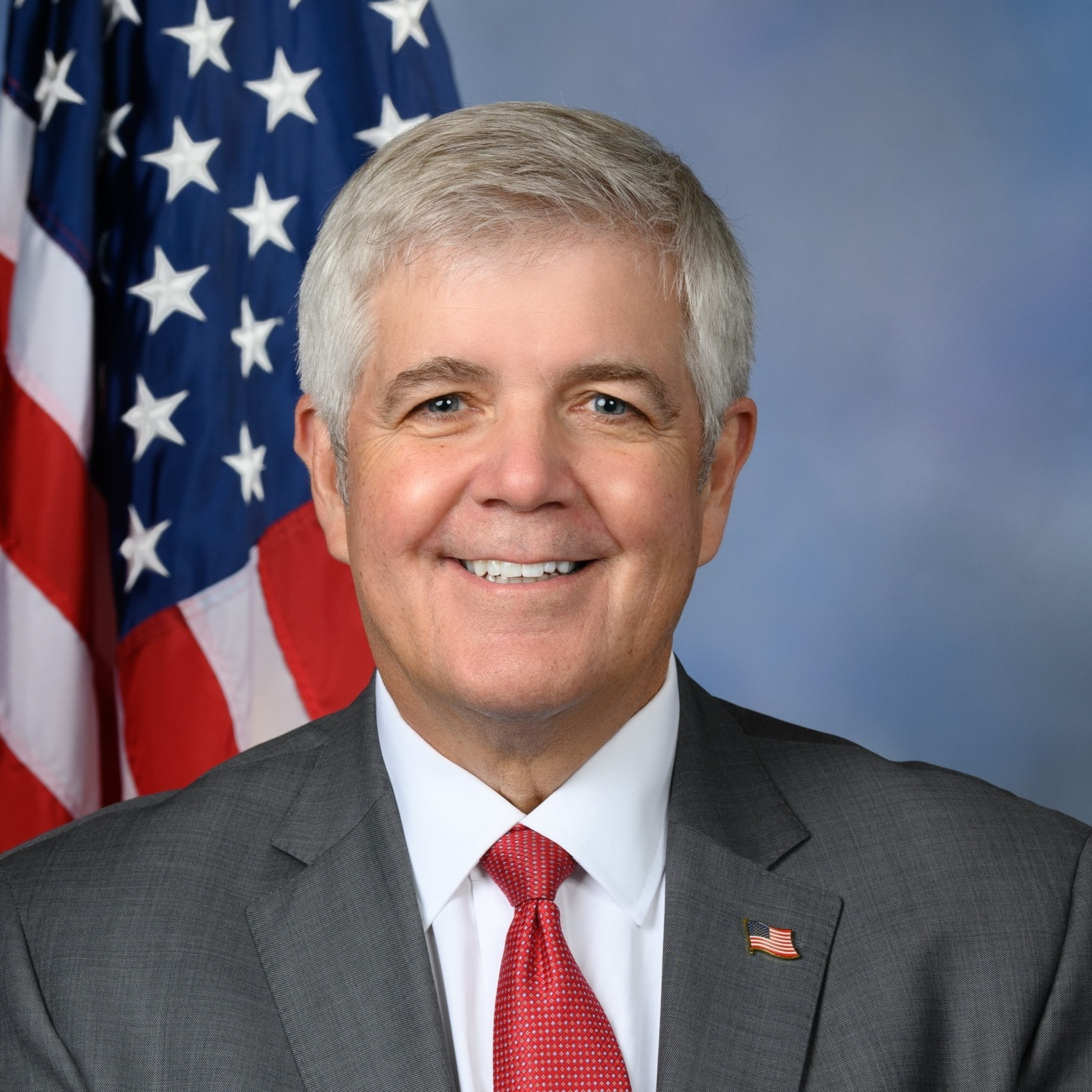
Cliff Bentz

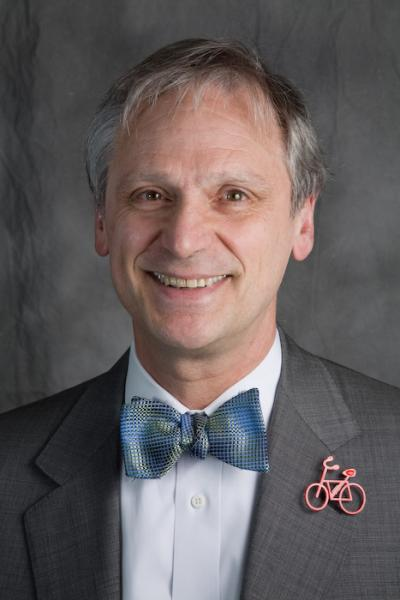
Earl Blumenauer

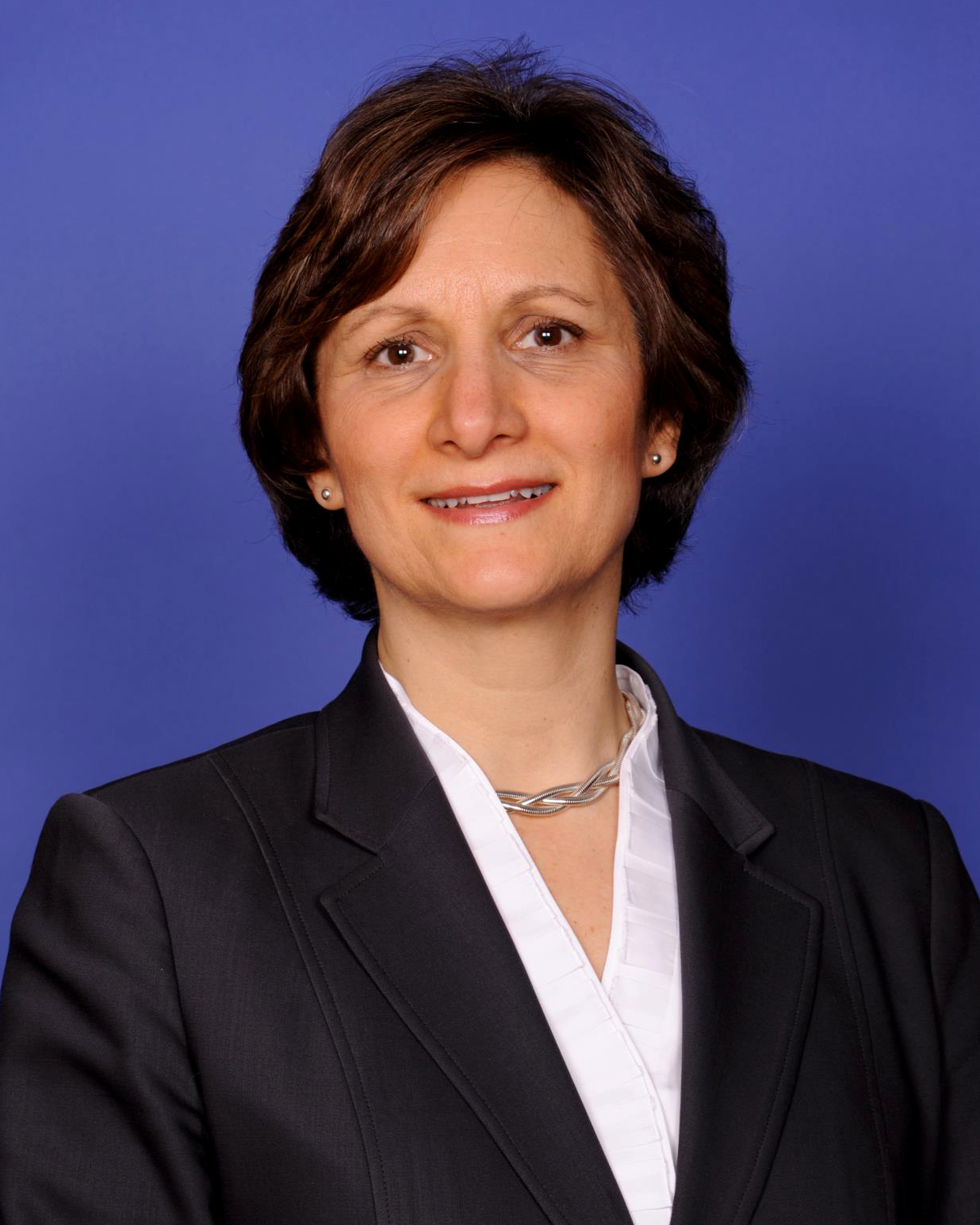
Suzanne Bonamici

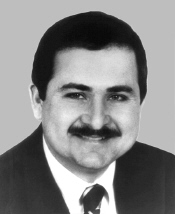
Jim Bunn

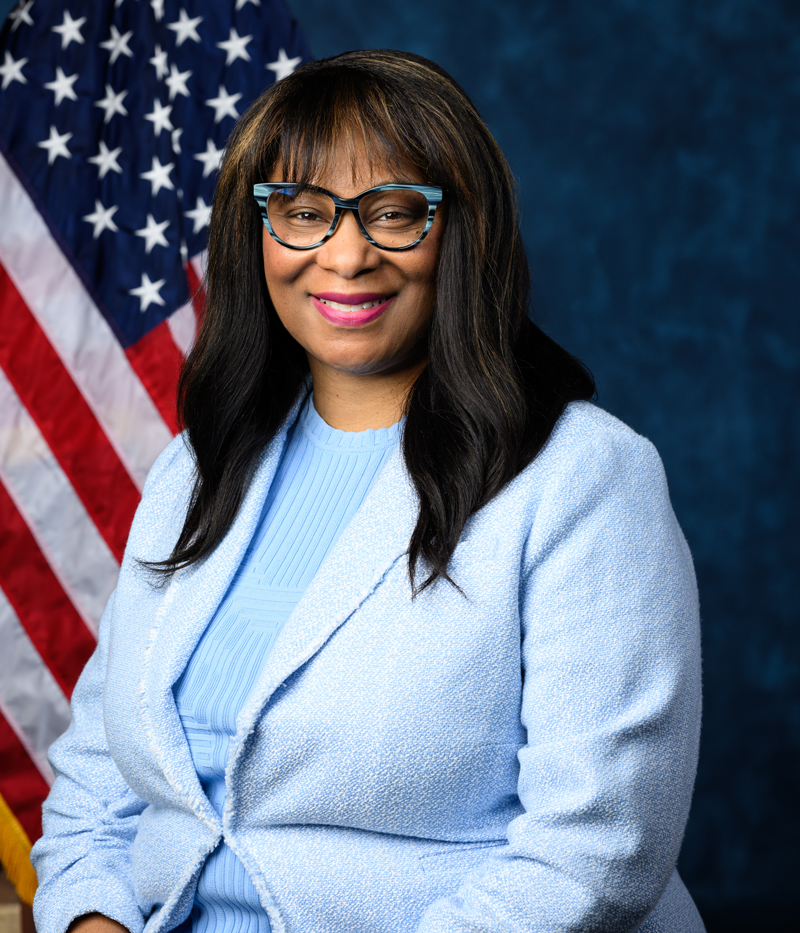
Janelle Bynum

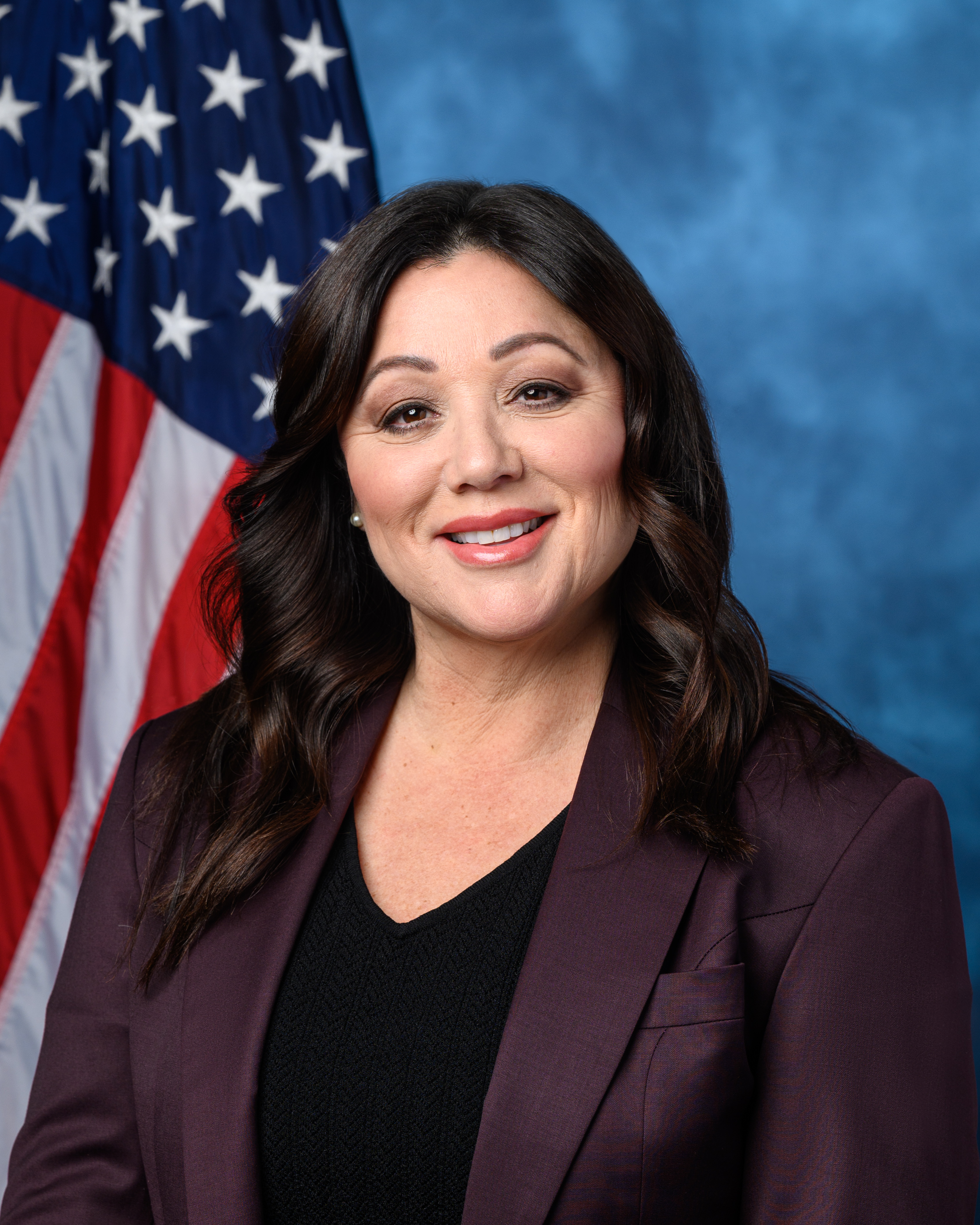
Lori Chavez-DeRemer

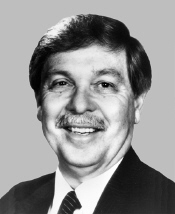
Wes Cooley

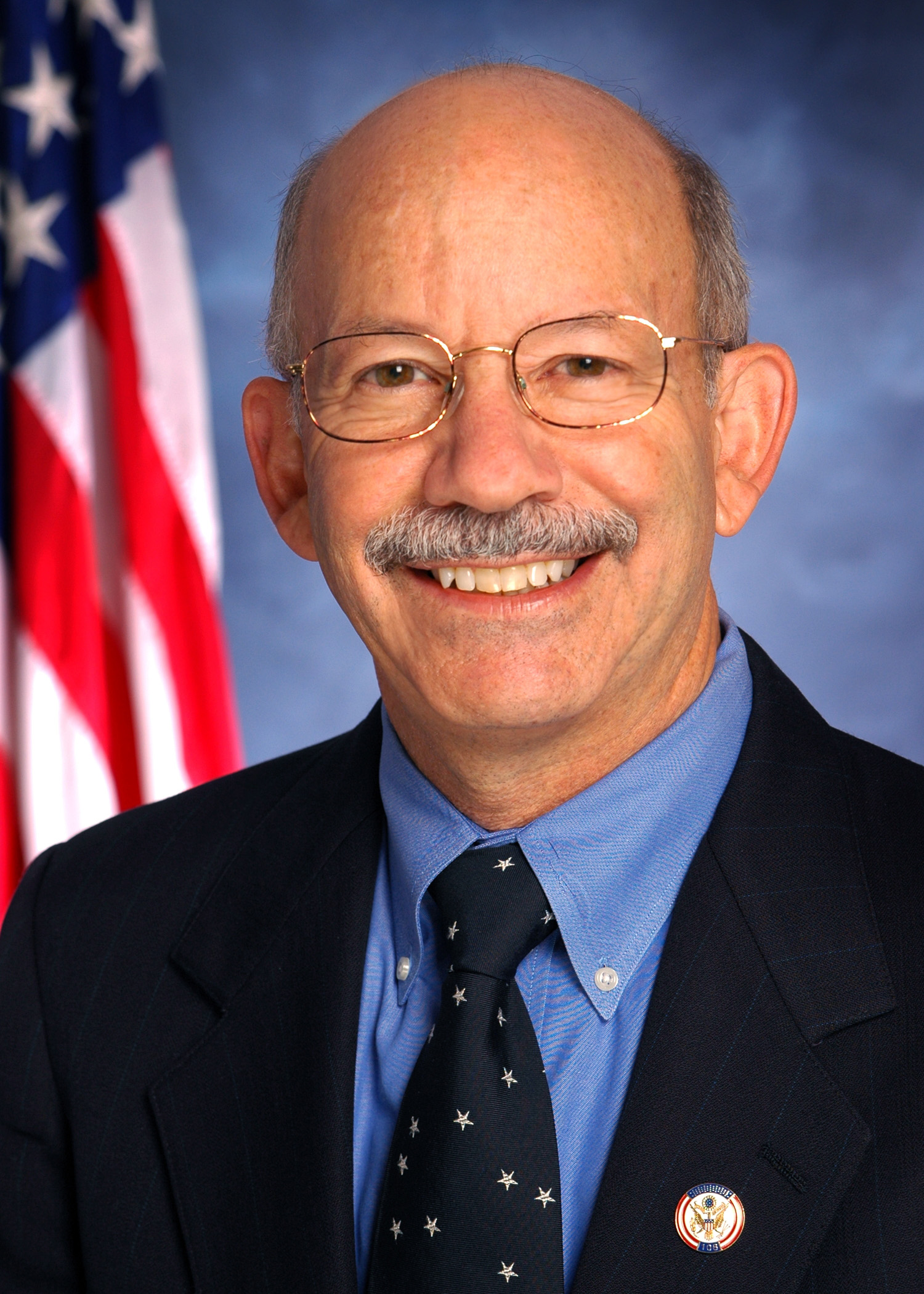
Peter DeFazio

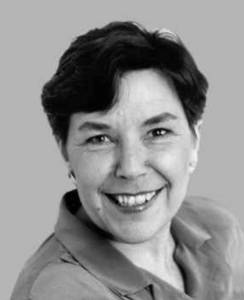
Elizabeth Furse

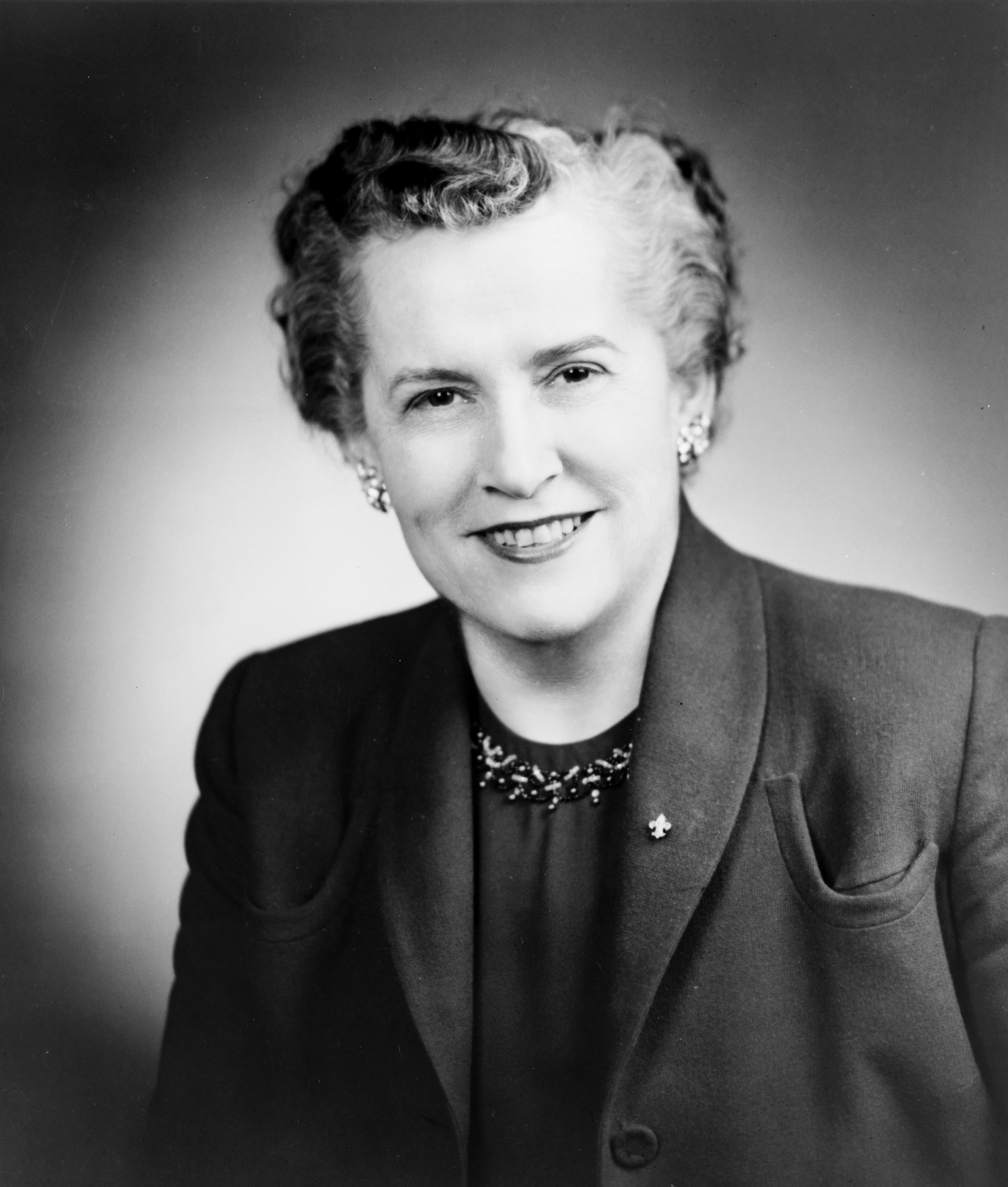
Edith Green

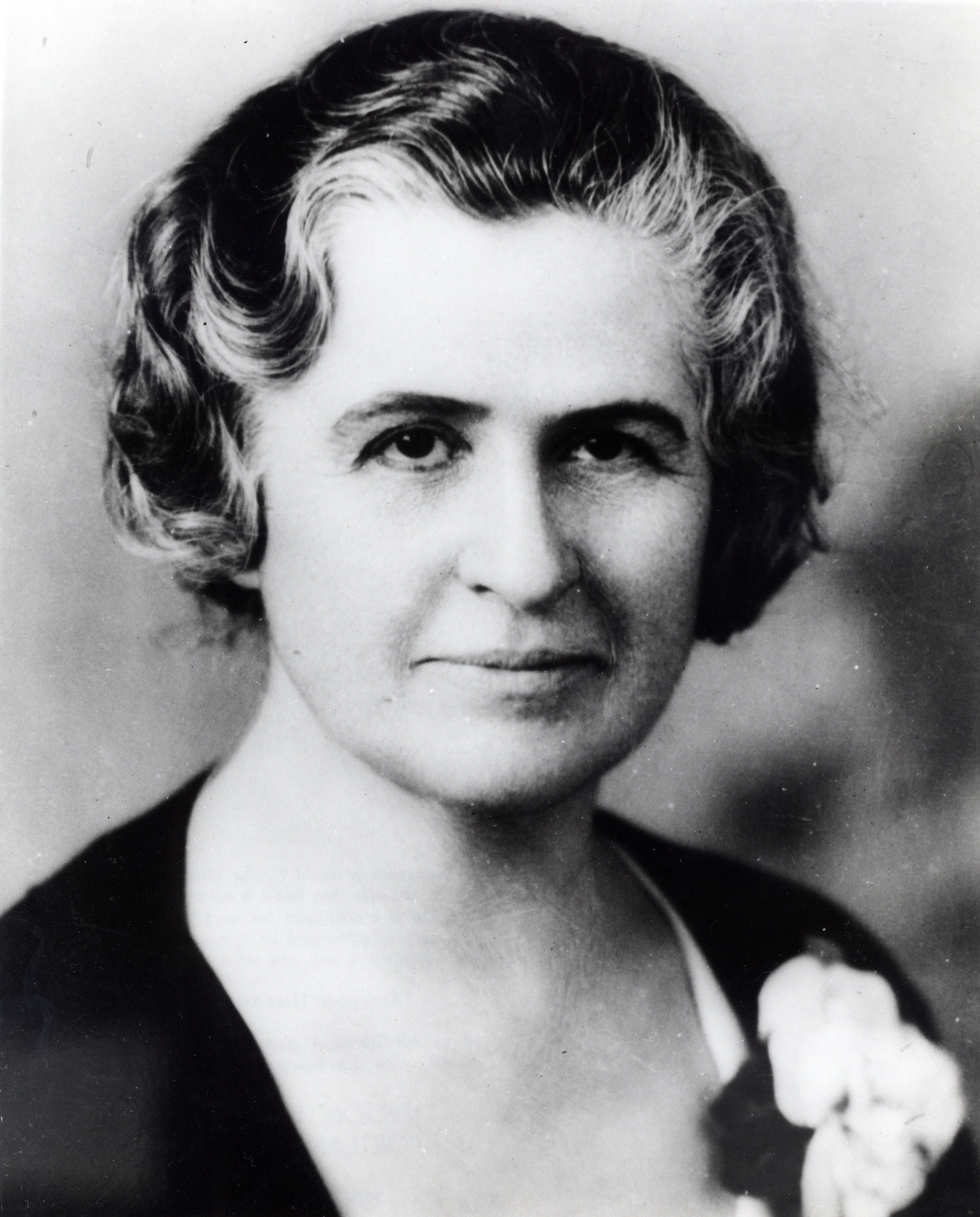
Nan Wood Honeyman

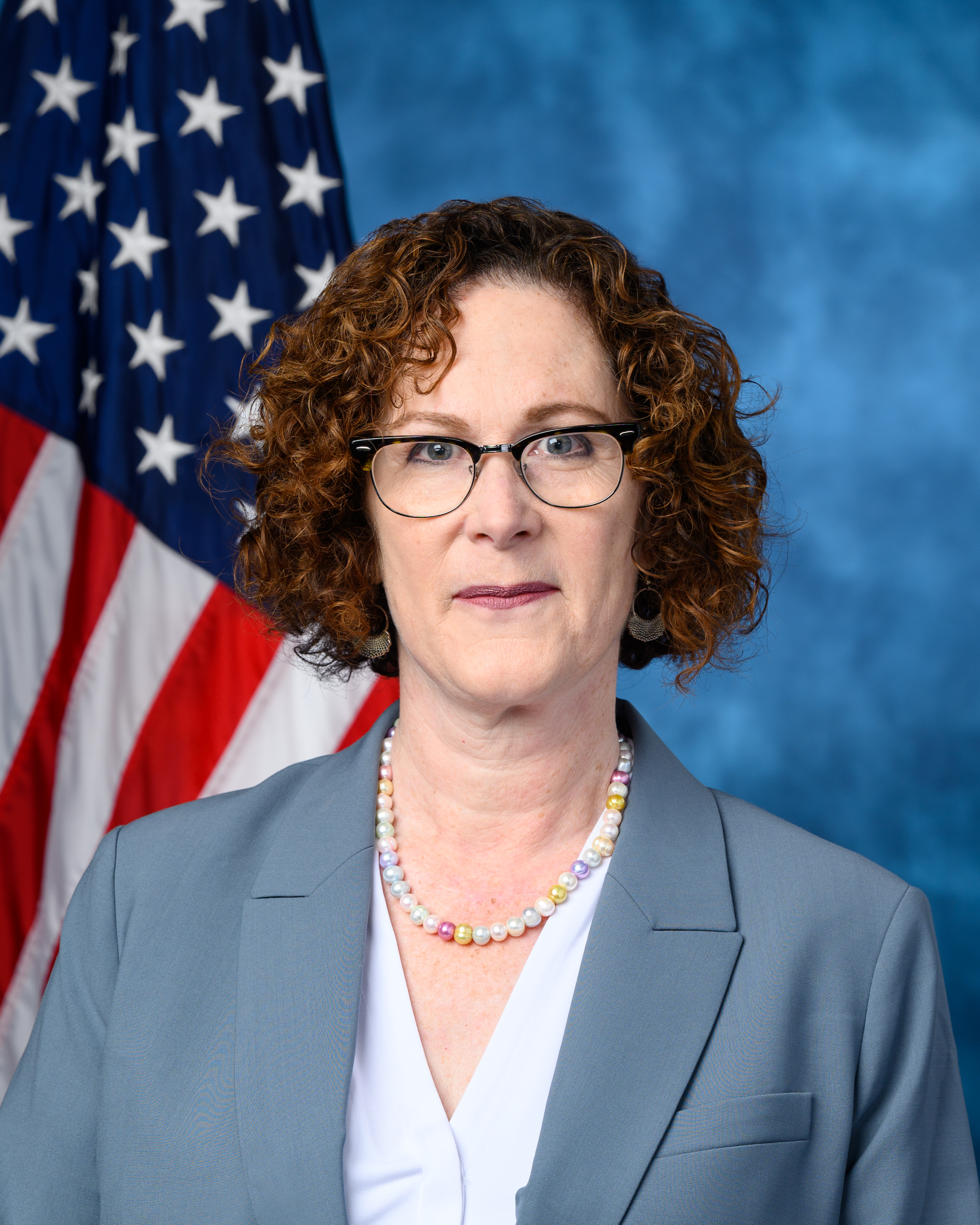
Val Hoyle

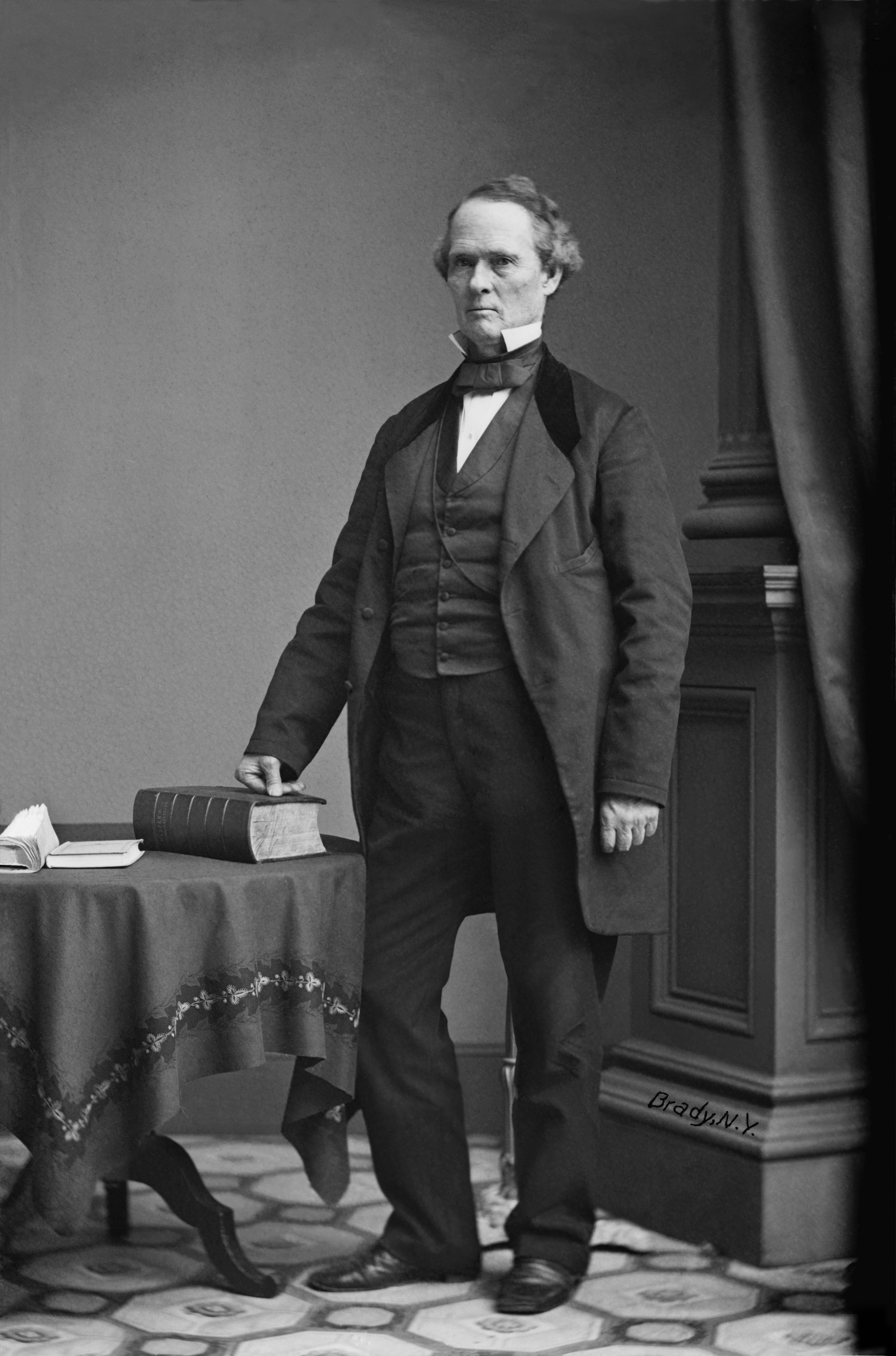
Joseph Lane

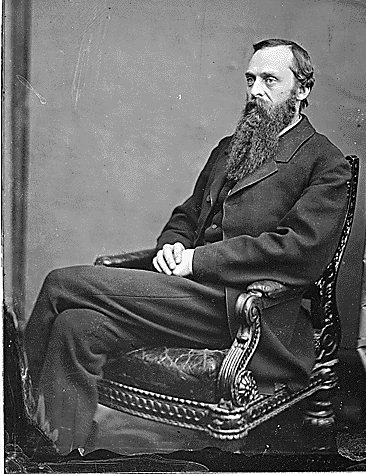
Rufus Mallory

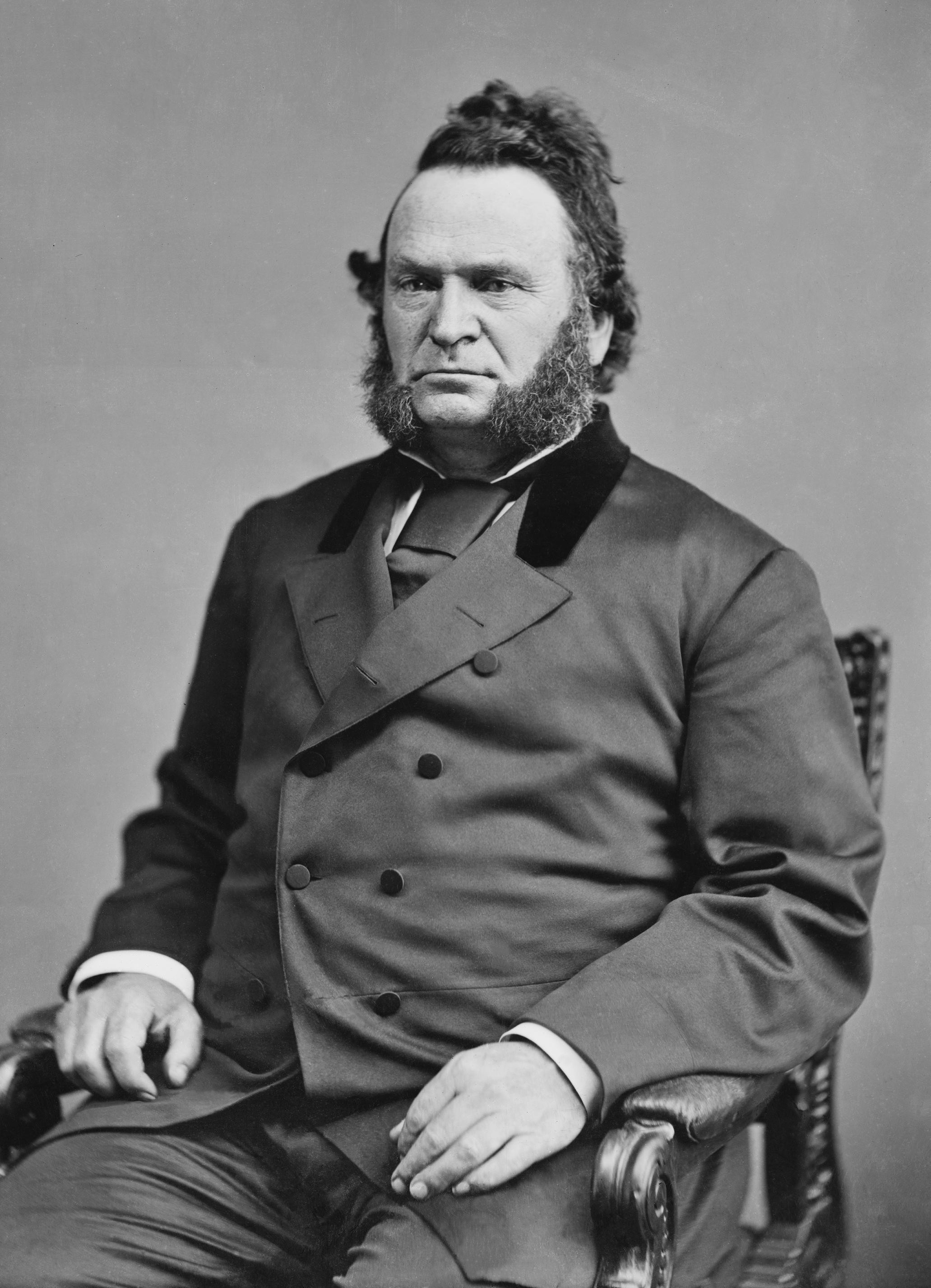
James W. Nesmith

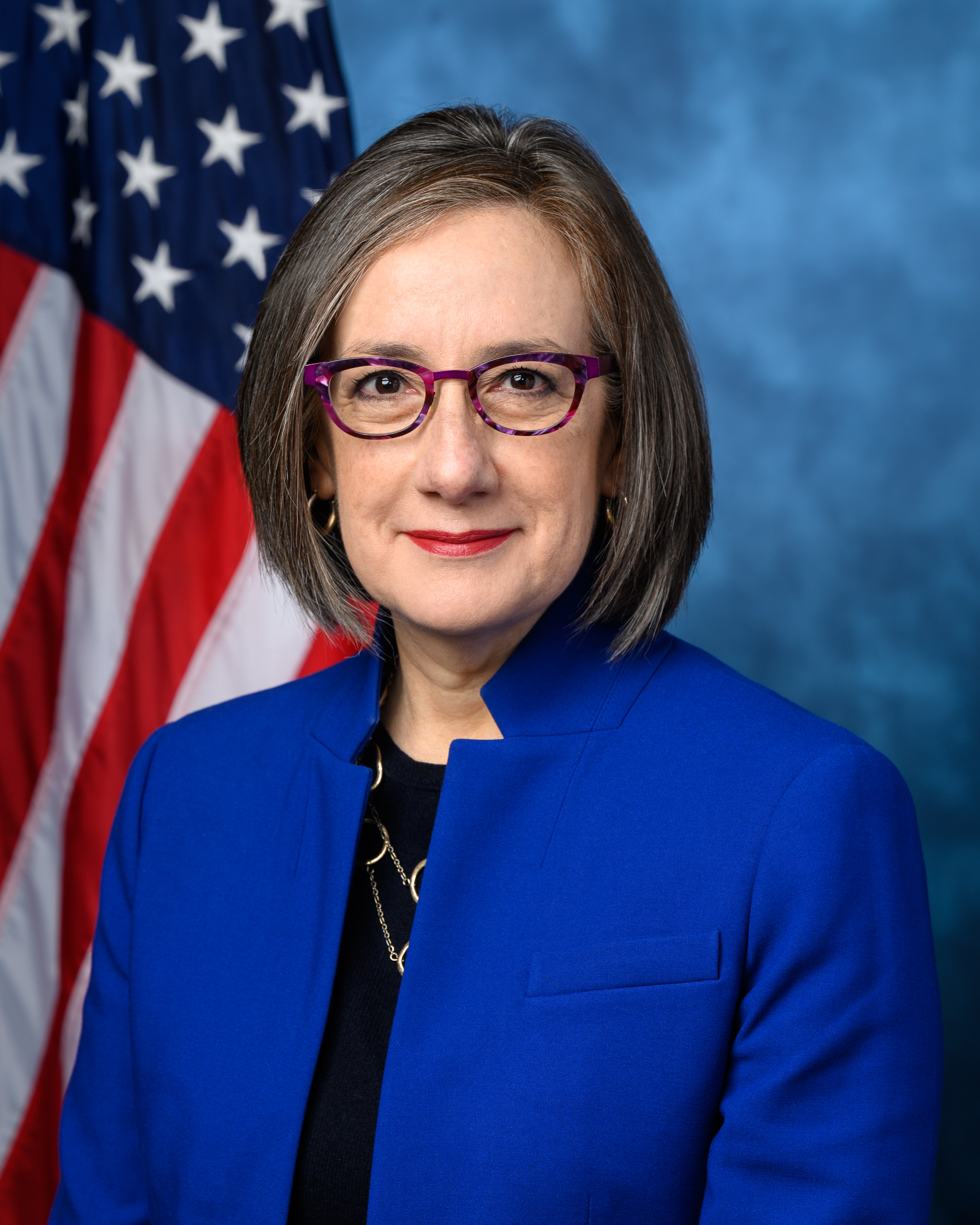
Andrea Salinas

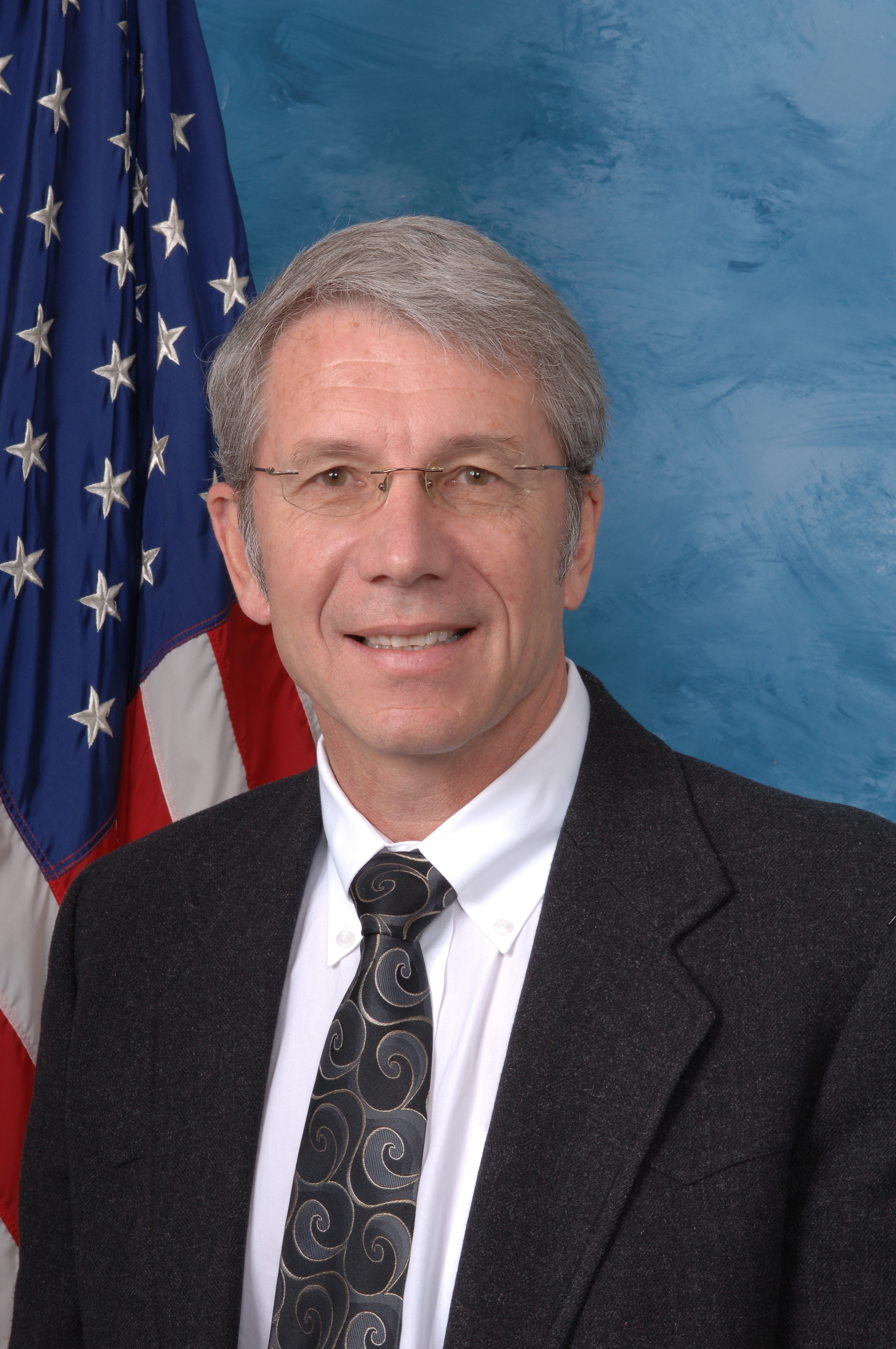
Kurt Schrader

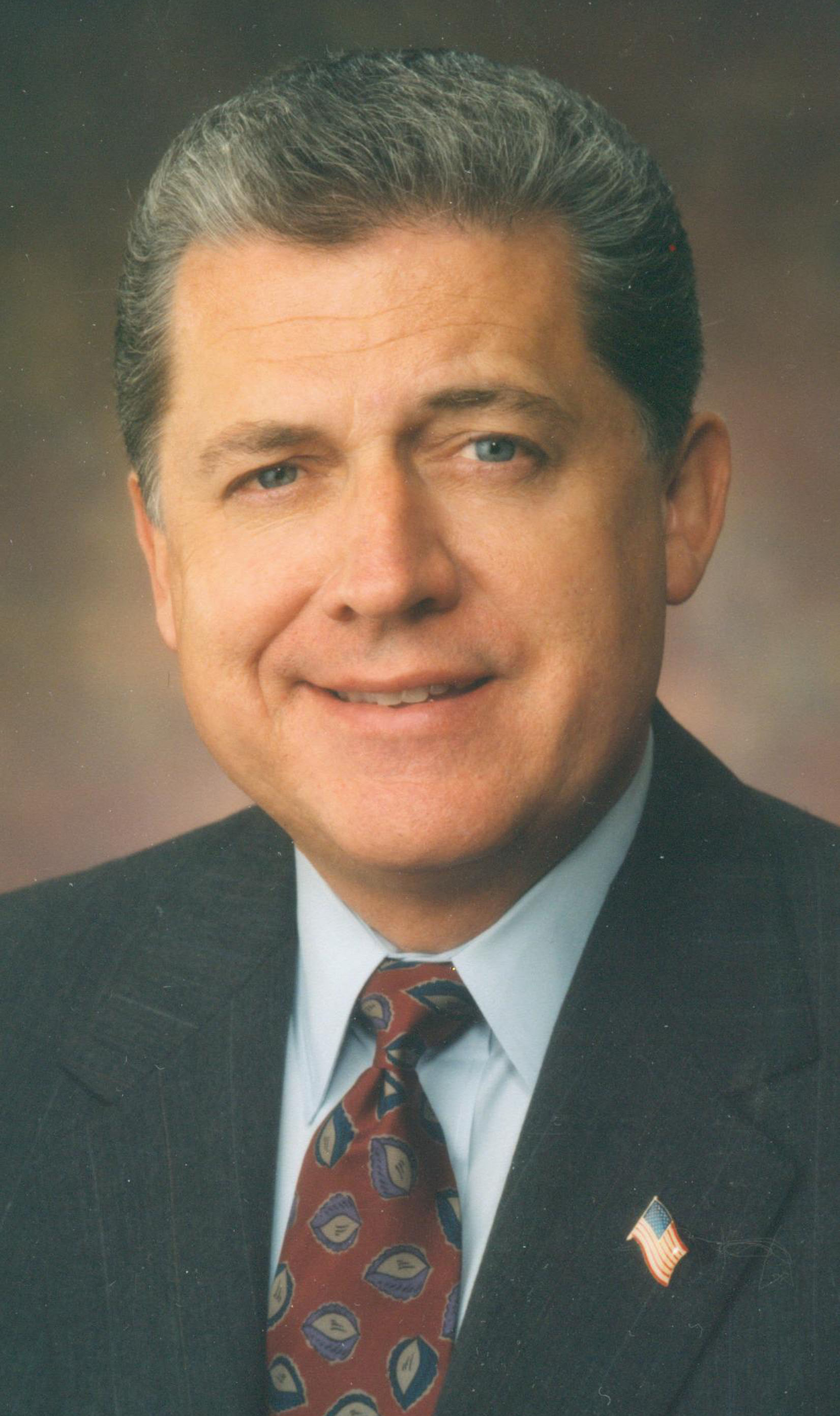
Denny Smith

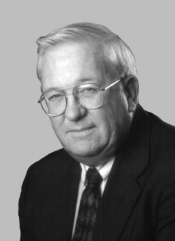
Robert F. Smith

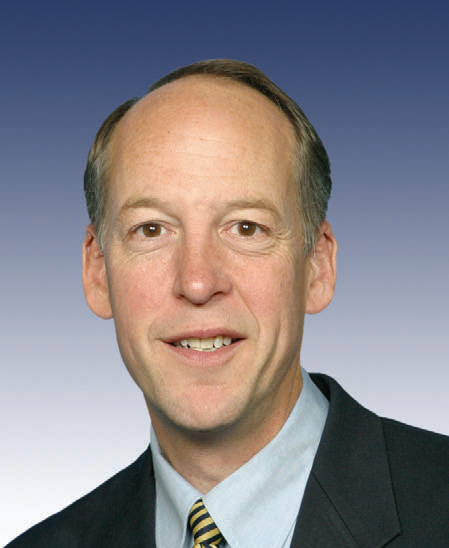
Greg Walden

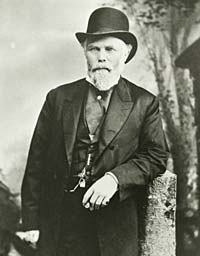
John Whiteaker

Representative	Party	District	Years	Note
Homer D. Angell	Republican	3rd	January 3, 1939 – January 3, 1955	Elected in 1938. Lost renomination to Tom McCall.
Les AuCoin	Democratic	1st	January 3, 1975 – January 3, 1993	Elected in 1974. Retired to run for U.S. senator.
Cliff Bentz	Republican	2nd	January 3, 2021 – present	Elected in 2020. Incumbent.
Earl Blumenauer	Democratic	3rd	May 21, 1996 – January 3, 2025	Elected to finish Wyden's term. Retired.
Suzanne Bonamici	Democratic	1st	January 31, 2012 – present	Elected to finish Wu's term. Incumbent.
Jim Bunn	Republican	5th	January 3, 1995 – January 3, 1997	Elected in 1994. Lost re-election to Hooley.
Robert R. Butler	Republican	2nd	November 6, 1928 – January 7, 1933	Elected to finish Sinnott's term. Lost re-election and died before next term began.
Janelle Bynum	Democratic	5th	January 3, 2025 – present	Elected in 2024. Incumbent.
Lori Chavez-DeRemer	Republican	5th	January 3, 2023 – January 3, 2025	Elected in 2022. Lost re-election to Bynum.
Wes Cooley	Republican	2nd	January 3, 1995 – January 3, 1997	Elected in 1994. Renominated but withdrew prior to election.
Sam Coon	Republican	2nd	January 3, 1953 – January 3, 1957	Elected in 1952. Lost re-election to Ullman.
Maurice E. Crumpacker	Republican	3rd	March 4, 1925 – July 24, 1927	Elected in 1924. Died.
Peter DeFazio	Democratic	4th	January 3, 1987 – January 3, 2023	Elected in 1986. Retired.
John R. Dellenback	Republican	4th	January 3, 1967 – January 3, 1975	Elected in 1966. Lost re-election to Weaver.
Maxine Dexter	Democratic	3rd	January 3, 2025 – present	Elected in 2024. Incumbent.
Robert B. Duncan	Democratic	4th	January 3, 1963 – January 3, 1967	Elected in 1962. Retired to run for U.S. senator.
Robert B. Duncan	Democratic	3rd	January 3, 1975 – January 3, 1981	Elected in 1974. Lost renomination to Wyden.
Edwin R. Durno	Republican	4th	January 3, 1961 – January 3, 1963	Elected in 1960. Retired to run for U.S. senator.
William A. Ekwall	Republican	3rd	January 3, 1935 – January 3, 1937	Elected in 1934. Lost re-election to Honeyman.
William R. Ellis	Republican	2nd	March 4, 1893 – March 3, 1899	Elected in 1892. Lost renomination to Moody.
William R. Ellis	Republican	2nd	March 4, 1907 – March 3, 1911	Elected in 1906. Lost renomination to Lafferty.
Harris Ellsworth	Republican	4th	January 3, 1943 – January 3, 1957	Elected in 1942. Lost re-election to Porter.
Elizabeth Furse	Democratic	1st	January 3, 1993 – January 3, 1999	Elected in 1992. Retired.
Melvin C. George	Republican	At-large	March 4, 1881 – March 3, 1885	Elected in 1880. Retired.
Edith Green	Democratic	3rd	January 3, 1955 – December 31, 1974	Elected in 1954. Retired and resigned early.
La Fayette Grover	Democratic	At-large	February 15, 1859 – March 3, 1859	Elected in 1858. Retired.
Willis C. Hawley	Republican	1st	March 4, 1907 – March 3, 1933	Elected in 1906. Lost renomination to Mott.
James H.D. Henderson	Republican	At-large	March 4, 1865 – March 3, 1867	Elected in 1864. Lost renomination to Mallory.
Binger Hermann	Republican	At-large	March 4, 1885 – March 3, 1893	Elected in 1884. Redistricted to the 1st district.
Binger Hermann	Republican	1st	March 4, 1893 – March 3, 1897	Redistricted from the at-large district and re-elected in 1892. Resigned to become Commissioner of the United States General Land Office.
Binger Hermann	Republican	1st	June 1, 1903 – March 3, 1907	Elected to finish Tongue's term. Retired.
Nan Wood Honeyman	Democratic	3rd	January 3, 1937 – January 3, 1939	Elected in 1936. Lost re-election to Angell.
Darlene Hooley	Democratic	5th	January 3, 1997 – January 3, 2009	Elected in 1996. Retired.
Val Hoyle	Democratic	4th	January 3, 2023 – present	Elected in 2022. Incumbent.
Michael J. Kopetski	Democratic	5th	January 3, 1991 – January 3, 1995	Elected in 1990. Retired.
Franklin F. Korell	Republican	3rd	October 18, 1927 – March 3, 1931	Elected to finish Crumpacker's term. Lost re-election to Martin.
George A. La Dow	Democratic	At-large	March 4, 1875 – May 1, 1875	Elected in 1874. Died.
Walter Lafferty	Republican	2nd	March 4, 1911 – March 3, 1913	Elected in 1910. Redistricted to the 3rd district.
Walter Lafferty	Republican	3rd	March 4, 1913 – March 3, 1915	Redistricted from the 2nd district and re-elected in 1912. Lost renomination to McArthur.
Joseph Lane	Democratic	Oregon Territory	March 4, 1851 – February 14, 1859	Elected in 1851; Retired to run for U.S. senator upon statehood.
Lafayette Lane	Democratic	At-large	October 25, 1875 – March 3, 1877	Elected to finish La Dow's term. Lost re-election to Williams.
Rufus Mallory	Republican	At-large	March 4, 1867 – March 3, 1869	Elected in 1866. Retired.
Charles H. Martin	Democratic	3rd	March 4, 1931 – January 3, 1935	Elected in 1930. Retired to run for governor.
Clifton N. McArthur	Republican	3rd	March 4, 1915 – March 3, 1923	Elected in 1914. Lost re-election to Watkins.
John R. McBride	Republican	At-large	March 4, 1863 – March 3, 1865	Elected in 1862. Lost renomination to Henderson.
Malcolm A. Moody	Republican	2nd	March 4, 1899 – March 3, 1903	Elected in 1898. Lost renomination to Williamson.
James W. Mott	Republican	1st	March 4, 1933 – November 12, 1945	Elected in 1932. Died.
James W. Nesmith	Democratic	At-large	December 1, 1873 – March 3, 1875	Elected to finish Wilson's term. Retired.
A. Walter Norblad	Republican	1st	January 18, 1946 – September 20, 1964	Elected to finish Mott's term. Died.
Walter M. Pierce	Democratic	2nd	March 4, 1933 – January 3, 1943	Elected in 1932. Lost re-election to Stockman.
Charles O. Porter	Democratic	4th	January 3, 1957 – January 3, 1961	Elected in 1956. Lost re-election to Durno.
Andrea Salinas	Democratic	6th	January 3, 2023 – present	Elected in 2022. Incumbent.
Kurt Schrader	Democratic	5th	January 3, 2009 – January 3, 2023	Elected in 2008. Lost renomination to Jamie McLeod-Skinner.
George K. Shiel	Democratic	At-large	July 30, 1861 – March 3, 1863	Won election contest. Retired.
Nicholas J. Sinnott	Republican	4th	March 4, 1913 – May 31, 1928	Elected in 1912. Resigned to become judge to the U.S. Court of Claims.
James H. Slater	Democratic	At-large	March 4, 1871 – March 3, 1873	Elected in 1870. Retired.
Denny Smith	Republican	2nd	January 3, 1981 – January 3, 1983	Elected in 1980. Redistricted to the 5th district.
Denny Smith	Republican	5th	January 3, 1983 – January 3, 1991	Redistricted from the 2nd district and re-elected in 1982. Lost re-election to Kopetski.
Joseph S. Smith	Democratic	At-large	March 4, 1869 – March 3, 1871	Elected in 1868. Retired.
Bob Smith	Republican	2nd	January 3, 1983 – January 3, 1995	Elected in 1982. Retired.
Bob Smith	Republican	2nd	January 3, 1997 – January 3, 1999	Elected in 1996. Retired.
Lowell Stockman	Republican	2nd	January 3, 1943 – January 3, 1953	Elected in 1942. Retired.
Lansing Stout	Democratic	At-large	March 4, 1859 – March 3, 1861	Elected in 1858. Lost renomination to Thayer.
Andrew J. Thayer	Democratic	At-large	March 4, 1861 – July 30, 1861	Elected in 1860. Lost election contest to Shiel.
Samuel Thurston	Democratic	Oregon Territory	March 4, 1849 – March 3, 1851	Elected in 1849; Died.
Thomas H. Tongue	Republican	1st	March 4, 1897 – January 11, 1903	Elected in 1896. Re-elected but died before next term began.
Al Ullman	Democratic	2nd	January 3, 1957 – January 3, 1981	Elected in 1956. Lost re-election to D. Smith.
Greg Walden	Republican	2nd	January 3, 1999 – January 3, 2021	Elected in 1998. Retired.
Elton Watkins	Democratic	3rd	March 4, 1923 – March 3, 1925	Elected in 1922. Lost re-election to Crumpacker.
James H. Weaver	Democratic	4th	January 3, 1975 – January 3, 1987	Elected in 1974. Retired to run for U.S. senator.
John Whiteaker	Democratic	At-large	March 4, 1879 – March 3, 1881	Elected in 1878. Lost re-election to George.
Richard Williams	Republican	At-large	March 4, 1877 – March 3, 1879	Elected in 1876. Retired.
John N. Williamson	Republican	2nd	March 4, 1903 – March 3, 1907	Elected in 1902; Retired.
Joseph G. Wilson	Republican	At-large	March 4, 1873 – July 2, 1873	Elected in 1872. Died.
David Wu	Democratic	1st	January 3, 1999 – August 3, 2011	Elected in 1998. Resigned due to sexual misconduct accusation.
Wendell Wyatt	Republican	1st	November 3, 1964 – January 3, 1975	Elected to finish Norblad's term. Retired.
Ron Wyden	Democratic	3rd	January 3, 1981 – February 5, 1996	Elected in 1980. Resigned when elected U.S. senator.

== See also ==
- List of United States senators from Oregon
- Oregon's congressional delegations
- Oregon's congressional districts
