= Justice Skinner =

Justice Skinner may refer to:

- Richard Skinner (American politician) (1778–1833), chief justice of the Vermont Supreme Court
- Onias C. Skinner (1817–1877), associate justice of the Illinois Supreme Court
- Alonzo A. Skinner (1814–1877), associate justice of the Oregon Supreme Court

== See also ==
- Judge Skinner (disambiguation)
