= John Kelsay (judge) =

American judge

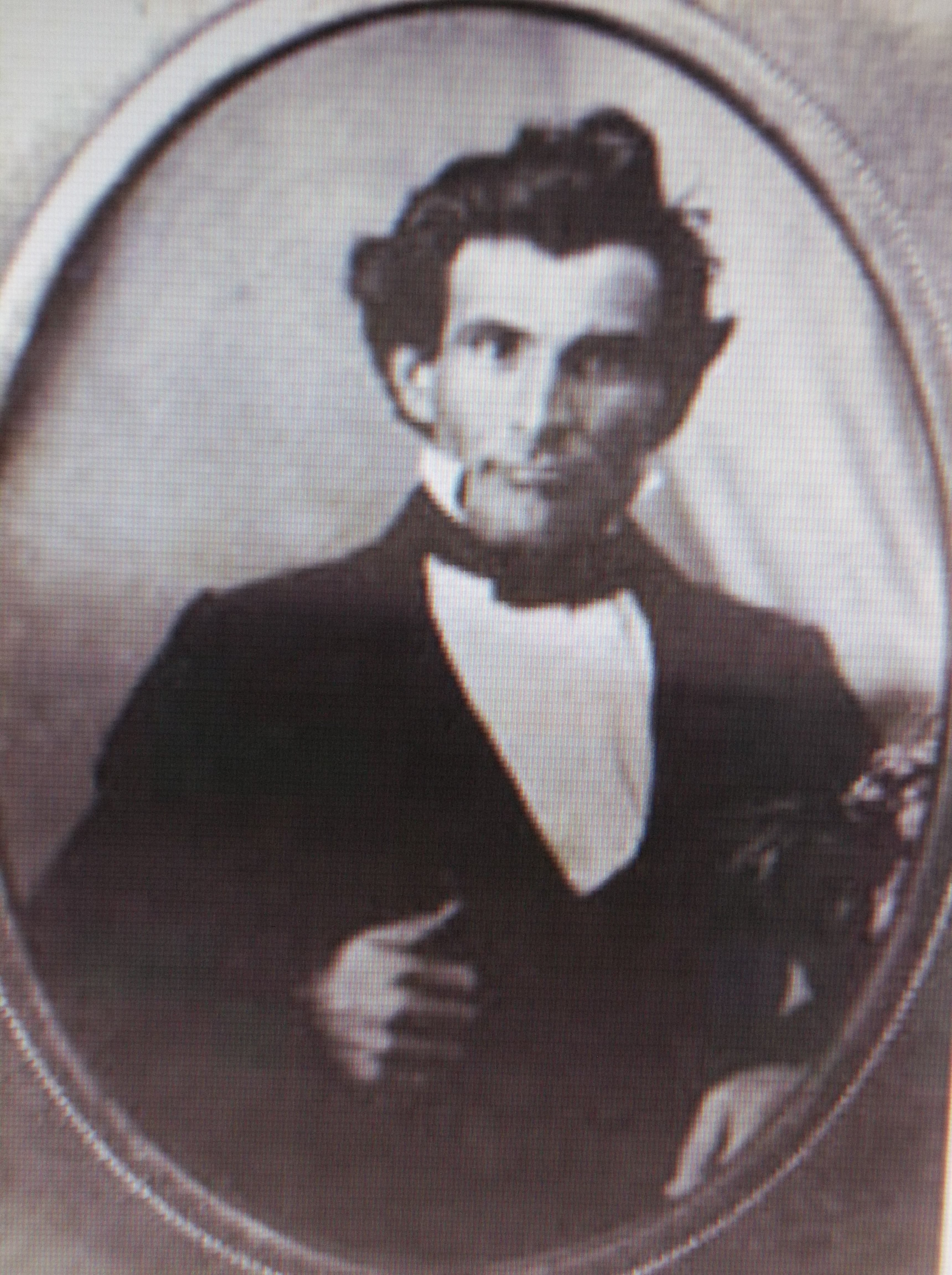

18th Justice of the Oregon Supreme Court
- In office 1868–1870
- Preceded by: Alonzo A. Skinner
- Succeeded by: Andrew J. Thayer

Personal details
- Born: October 23, 1819 Wayne County, Kentucky, U.S.
- Died: January 19, 1899 (aged 79) Oregon, U.S.
- Spouse(s): Martha C. Monroe (1846); Cornelia Corintner (1864)

John Kelsay (October 23, 1819 – January 19, 1899) was an American politician and judge in Oregon. He was the 18th justice of the Oregon Supreme Court, and fought in the Rogue River Wars. A Kentucky native, he was a member of the 1857 Oregon Constitutional Convention and served in the Missouri General Assembly.

== Early life ==
Kelsay was born to Alexander Kelsay and his wife Jane Kelley in the state of Kentucky in Wayne County on October 23, 1819. At the age of ten the family and John relocated to Missouri. There his mother educated John and then later he would begin the study of law in 1842. In July 1845 he passed the bar and was allowed to practice law. In 1846 he married for the first time to Matha C. Monroe.

== Oregon ==
In 1853, John Kelsay and his wife moved to Oregon Territory over the Oregon Trail. There the family settled in Corvallis, Oregon where Kelsay set up a law practice. Shortly after arriving, he organized one regiment of troops to serve battling the Rogue River tribe in southwestern Oregon and earned the title of colonel.

== Political career ==
Kelsay was elected to the Missouri House of Representatives and served in 1844 as a delegate from Morgan County. Then in Oregon in 1857 he represented Benton County at the Oregon Constitutional Convention as Oregon prepared for statehood. At the convention John was selected as chairman of the military committee. In 1868 Kelsay won the election for a seat on the Oregon Supreme Court. His two-year term ended in 1870 and he left the bench. However, in both 1870 and 1872 he was nominated as a Republican for the court. In Oregon he was one of the early leaders of the Republican Party.

== Later life ==
Before his time on the high court Kelsay married a second time in 1864. With his second wife Cornelia Corintner he fathered two children. Later served as mayor of Corvallis. John Kelsay died on January 19, 1899, in Oregon.
