= Judge Skinner =

Judge Skinner may refer to:

- Roger Skinner (1773–1825), judge of the United States District Court for the Northern District of New York
- Walter Jay Skinner (1927–2005), judge of the United States District Court for the District of Massachusetts

== See also ==
- Justice Skinner (disambiguation)
