= Woodson T. Slater =

American judge

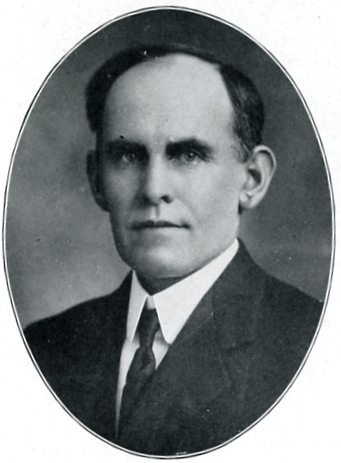
- Slater in 1910

38th Justice of the Oregon Supreme Court
- In office 1909–1911
- Appointed by: George Earle Chamberlain
- Preceded by: new position
- Succeeded by: George H. Burnett

Personal details
- Born: November 18, 1858 Corvallis, Oregon
- Died: November 30, 1928 (aged 70) Portland, Oregon
- Spouse: Mary Price Howe

Woodson Taylor Slater (November 18, 1858 – November 30, 1928) was an American attorney and jurist in Oregon. He was the 38th associate justice of the Oregon Supreme Court, serving from 1909 to 1911. Slater was the son of Congressman James H. Slater. The Oregon native also worked in the state’s treasurer’s office and for the Supreme Court prior to his appointment as a judge to the state’s highest court.

== Early life ==
Woodson Slater was born on November 18, 1858, in Corvallis, Benton County, Oregon Territory to Elizabeth (Edna) Gray and later Congressman James H. Slater. In 1863 the family moved to Walla Walla, Washington, and then Auburn, Oregon, before settling in the Eastern Oregon town of La Grande in 1866. There in Union County Woodson received his primary education in the public schools. In 1883, he graduated from the University of Oregon in Eugene, Oregon, before being admitted to the bar two years later. Slater married in 1885 to Mary Price Howe and the couple would have four children.

== Legal career ==
Upon becoming a lawyer Slater moved to Pendleton, Oregon, and began practicing law in 1886. The following year he moved to Salem, Oregon, where he worked in the office of the Oregon State Treasurer until 1890. He then returned to La Grande where he became involved in the mercantile industry, but returned to Salem in 1894 and opened a law practice. In Salem, he taught law at Willamette University College of Law in 1903 as a professor of torts and contracts. Then from 1907 until early 1909 he was the commissioner of the Oregon Supreme Court. On February 12, 1909, Oregon Governor George Earle Chamberlain appointed Slater to the state supreme court bench when the court expanded from three to five justices. He left the court at the end of the term on January 1, 1911.

== Later years ==
Woodson T. Slater died in Portland, Oregon, on November 30, 1928, at the age of 70.
