= George K. Shiel =

American politician

George Knox Shiel

Member of the U.S. House of Representatives from Oregon's At-large district
- In office July 30, 1861 – March 3, 1863
- Preceded by: Andrew J. Thayer
- Succeeded by: John R. McBride

Personal details
- Born: c. 1825 Ireland, U.K.
- Died: December 12, 1893 (aged 67–68) Salem, Oregon, U.S.
- Party: Democratic

George Knox Shiel (c. 1825 – December 12, 1893) was an American lawyer and politician who served one term as a Democratic U.S. congressman from Oregon from 1861 to 1863.

== Early life ==
Born on the island of Ireland (the entirety of which was then part of the United Kingdom) in 1825, Shiel migrated to the United States and settled in New Orleans. He moved to Ohio where he was admitted to the bar and began a law practice. He moved to Salem, Oregon, in 1854 and continued his law practice. He was nominated for colonel of Marion County at the 1856 Oregon Democratic Convention, and though it is unlikely he commanded any troops, he kept the title until his death.

== Congressional election ==
In June 1860, Shiel was elected as a Democratic United States Representative for Oregon's at-large district. However, after the June election, the Oregon House of Representatives passed a bill moving the date of U. S. Congress elections to November, effective immediately. The Oregon Senate passed a similar bill, but that bill did not apply to the current election. Though the bills were never reconciled or signed into law, another election was held nonetheless, and was won by Andrew J. Thayer. Thayer's election was certified and he took the seat in March 1861.

Shiel contested the election on the grounds that the Oregon constitution had set the election date and no law had been passed to change it. Thayer argued that the Oregon constitution referred only to Oregon's first congressional election in 1858, and that Shiel's election in June was invalid. Since Oregonians had a right to Congressional representation, and since the Oregon Legislature had the clear intent for a November election, Thayer argued his election was the only valid one.

On July 30, 1861, the House of Representatives' Committee on Elections, led by Henry L. Dawes of Massachusetts, sided with Shiel, holding that the state constitution's June election date should be considered law, and that even if the Oregon Legislature had successfully changed it, it would have been unconstitutional.

An amendment by Thaddeus Stevens of Pennsylvania to declare the seat vacant was defeated by a vote of 77–37. Stevens was concerned that the decision was in violation of Article I, Section 4 of the United States Constitution. The House stripped Thayer of his seat and Shiel was immediately sworn in.

Shiel's tenure in Congress was not particularly notable. Despite being considered a great orator, Oregon historian Ben Maxwell wrote that Shiel was "regarded as the most inconsequential congressman ever sent to Washington from Oregon." Shiel was known as a pro-slavery secessionist, and was a bitter foe of President Abraham Lincoln's.

== After Congress ==
After serving in Congress, Shiel returned to Oregon, where he had a checkered career. He was barred from practicing law for a time as he refused to take the required oath of allegiance. On the night of December 12, 1893, after socializing at the Willamette Hotel (later renamed the Marion Hotel) in Salem, he fell through a railing along the sidewalk into a 14-foot-deep (4.3 m) basement stairwell, breaking his neck and dying almost instantly. Reports vary as to whether Shiel, who had a reputation as a drinker, was drunk at the time.

Shiel is buried in Salem Pioneer Cemetery, though his name is misspelled as "Shields" on the tombstone.

U.S. House of Representatives
Preceded by Andrew J. Thayer	Member of the U.S. House of Representatives from Oregon's 1st congressional district July 30, 1861–March 3, 1863	Succeeded by John R. McBride
