= Lansing Stout =

American politician

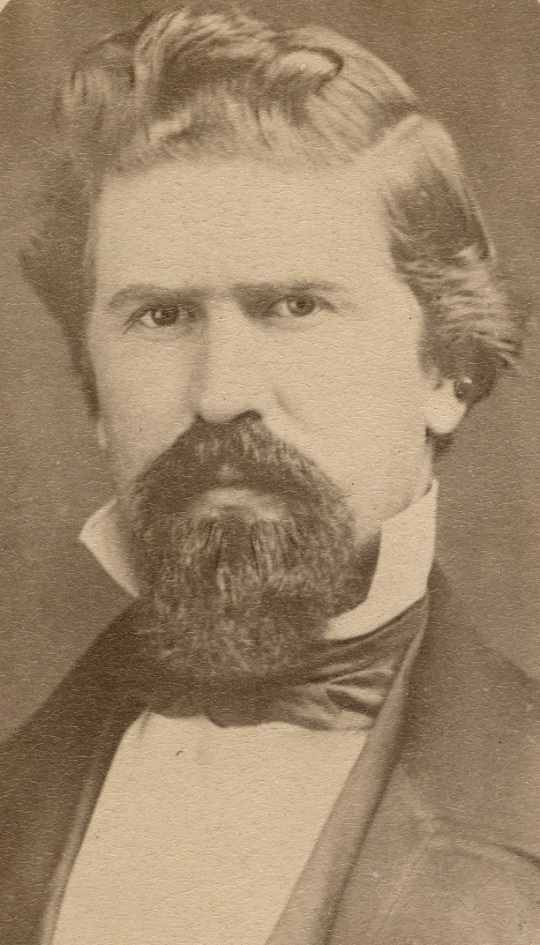
- 1857 carte de visite photo. The Oregon Historical Society.

Member of the U.S. House of Representatives from Oregon's At-large district
- In office March 4, 1859 – March 3, 1861
- Preceded by: La Fayette Grover
- Succeeded by: Andrew J. Thayer

Personal details
- Born: March 27, 1828 New York
- Died: March 4, 1871 (aged 42) Portland, Oregon
- Resting place: River View Cemetery
- Party: Democratic
- Spouse: Susan Plowden Stout

Lansing Stout (March 27, 1828 – March 4, 1871) was an American politician and lawyer. He was the second person elected to the United States House of Representatives from the state of Oregon, serving one term in Congress from 1859 to 1861.

A New York native, he also served in both the California State Assembly and the Oregon State Senate.

== Early life ==
Stout was born in the state of New York on March 27, 1828 (either in Pamelia or Watertown) and educated in public schools. He then studied law in Albany, New York under Ira Harris.

=== Early career ===
He was admitted to the bar in New York, but in 1851 he left for California, arriving in 1852. He settled in Placer County, California, where he practiced law. In 1855, he served in the State Assembly. In 1857 he moved to Portland, Oregon, where he continued practicing law. In Oregon, Stout formed a law partnership with the U.S. Attorney for the Oregon Territory, William H. Farrar.

== Politics ==
Stout was elected to the California Assembly in 1855.

His first foray into Oregon politics came in 1858, when he was elected as a judge in Multnomah County, Oregon. Later that year Stout was elected to the U.S. House in 1858 after Oregon had submitted to become a state, but months before statehood on February 14, 1859. In this bid, he was supported by pro-slavery factions led by Joseph Lane. After breaking ties with Lane, Stout was not re-nominated in 1860 by the state Democrats. While in serving in the 36th Congress, he served on the Committee on Expenses in the State Department and a committee on the rebellious states. In 1868 he was elected to the Oregon State Senate as a Republican, representing Multnomah County. He did not win re-election.

== Later life ==
Stout married Susan Plowden in 1861 while back east serving in Congress. The two were married in Leonardtown, Maryland, and had two sons. The two moved to Oregon in 1863. During his time in Oregon Stout was admitted to the Oregon Supreme Court bar during the territorial period. After serving in Congress, Stout resumed his private practice in Oregon. He died in Portland on March 4, 1871, and was buried at River View Cemetery. After his death, Susan married Clatsop County Circuit Judge Raleigh Stott.

U.S. House of Representatives
Preceded by La Fayette Grover	Member of the U.S. House of Representatives from Oregon's at-large congressional district March 4, 1859–March 3, 1861	Succeeded by Andrew J. Thayer
