= Rufus Mallory =

American politician from Oregon

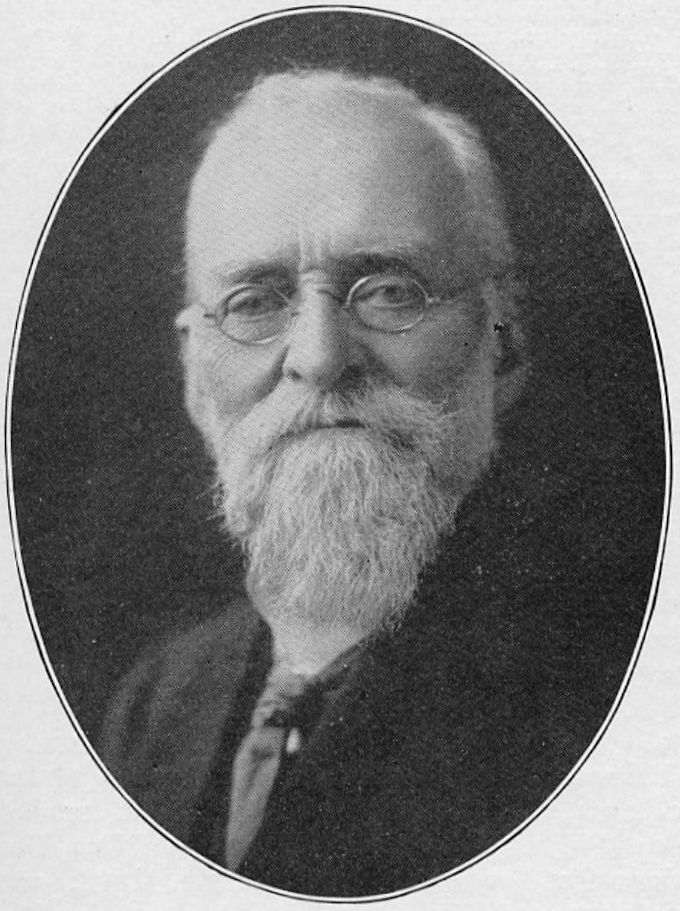
- Mallory about 1910

Member of the U.S. House of Representatives from Oregon's At-large district
- In office March 4, 1867 – March 3, 1869
- Preceded by: James H. D. Henderson
- Succeeded by: Joseph S. Smith

8th Speaker of the Oregon House of Representatives
- In office 1872–1873
- Preceded by: Benjamin Hayden
- Succeeded by: John C. Drain
- Constituency: Marion County

Member of the Oregon House of Representatives
- In office 1862

Personal details
- Born: Rufus Mallory; January 10, 1831 Coventry, New York
- Died: April 30, 1914 (aged 83) Portland, Oregon
- Resting place: Portland Cremation Association
- Party: Republican
- Spouse: Lucy A. Rose

Rufus Mallory (January or June 10, 1831 – April 30, 1914) was an American educator, lawyer, and politician in the state of Oregon. A native of New York, he was a teacher in Iowa before moving to Oregon where he became an attorney. He was a district attorney before he served in the Oregon House of Representatives in the early 1860s. A Republican, he served as U.S. Representative from Oregon for a single term from 1867 to 1869 and then returned to the state house where he was Speaker of the Oregon House. Later he worked for the U.S. Treasury Department, while the Hotel Mallory in Portland was commissioned by him. Portland has additionally honored his memory via Mallory Avenue in the Albina District.

== Early life ==
Rufus Mallory was born in Coventry, New York, 1831 on either June 10 or January 10 to Samuel and Lucretia Mallory (née Davis). One of nine children, he attended the local schools in Allegany and Steuben counties, first at Scio from 1835 to 1837, followed by school in Greenwood from 1837 to 1845. In 1845 he started at Alfred Academy (now Alfred University) in New York, spending a single term each year in 1845, 1846, and 1848. Mallory left at age 16 to begin teaching and reading law. He moved to New London, Iowa, where he taught school from 1855 to 1858.

== Oregon ==
In 1858, he left Iowa to move to the then Oregon Territory by way of the Isthmus of Panama route. He arrived on the first day of 1859 and settled in the Southern Oregon town of Roseburg in Douglas County where he continued teaching for 15 months. He studied law, was admitted to the bar in 1860, and was selected as the district attorney for Douglas, Jackson, and Josephine counties. Mallory married Lucy A. Rose, the daughter of Roseburg founder Aaron Rose, on June 24, 1860, and they had one son.

In 1862, he was elected to the Oregon House of Representatives as a Republican. Mallory represented Douglas County and continued in office until 1864. Late in 1862 he moved to Salem along with his law partner James M. Pyle. There he was again selected as a district attorney, for Oregon's third district, in office from 1862 to 1866. As a prosecutor in Salem, he gained fame for securing the conviction of George Beale and George Baker for the murder of farmer Daniel Delaney in one of Oregon's first sensational trials. The convicted men were hanged in front of thousands of onlookers in downtown Salem on May 17, 1865.

== Congress ==
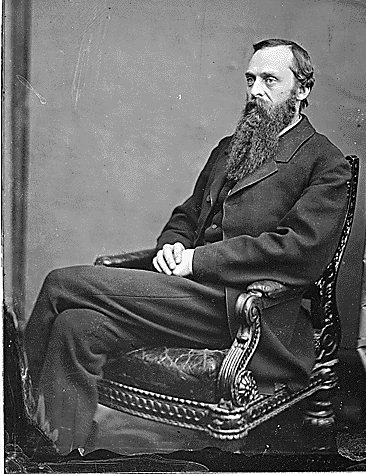
Mallory's Congressional portrait

A year later, Mallory's fame led him to win election as Oregon's representative in the United States House of Representatives. Mallory defeated his opponent James D. Fay by 600 votes. His term in Congress coincided with the impeachment of Andrew Johnson. Mallory, a Republican, voted against the first failed attempt at impeachment in the fall of 1867, but in the second attempt in February 1868, gave an impassioned speech on the House floor, and voted with his party to impeach the President. He would serve one term, from March 4, 1867, to March 3, 1869, and did not seek re-election in 1868. Mallory was one of four House Republicans to oppose the final version of the Fifteenth Amendment to the United States Constitution; he was absent from the vote on its initial version.

== Later years ==
After serving in Congress, Mallory resumed his Salem law practice. In 1872, he was again elected to the Oregon House of Representatives from Marion County, and served as Speaker of the House. After one two-year term, he was appointed as United States district attorney in 1874 and served until 1882. He was then appointed as a special agent of the Treasury Department in Singapore, British Malaya, and after completing the necessary business, continued around the world in 78 days to Portland, where he resumed his law practice. Mallory joined the firm of Dolph, Bellinger, Mallory & Simon in November 1883.

In 1887, Mallory was one of the incorporators of the Willamette Bridge Railway Company. The first Morrison Street Bridge was completed in April 1887 and Mallory's company operated a steam-powered streetcar across the bridge, expanding into the Sunnyside neighborhood in 1888 and then to Mt. Tabor in 1889. In 1890, he became one of the founding members of the Oregon Bar Association.

== Death and legacy ==
Rufus Mallory died in Portland on April 30, 1914, at the age of 83, with his cremated remains placed in the vaults of the Portland Cremation Association.

The Hotel Mallory in Portland, built in 1912, was commissioned by Mallory. The structure was added to the National Register of Historic Places in 2004, was thoroughly renovated, and reopened as the Hotel deLuxe in 2006.

U.S. House of Representatives
Preceded by James H. D. Henderson	Member of the U.S. House of Representatives from Oregon's at-large congressional district March 4, 1867 – March 3, 1869	Succeeded by Joseph S. Smith
