= James H. Slater =

American politician (1826–1899)

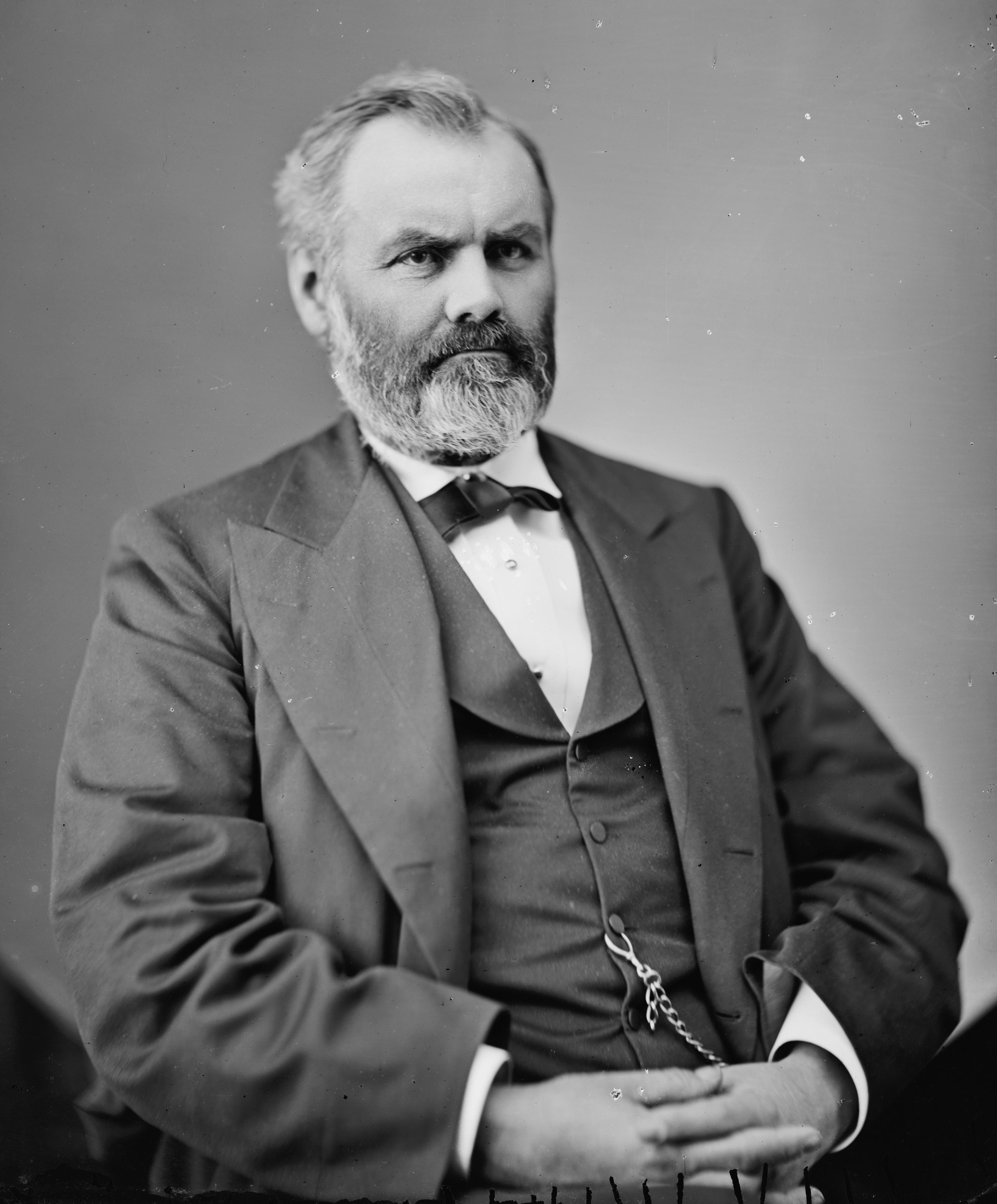

United States Senator from Oregon
- In office March 4, 1879 – March 3, 1885
- Preceded by: John H. Mitchell
- Succeeded by: John H. Mitchell

Member of the U.S. House of Representatives from Oregon's At-large district
- In office March 4, 1871 – March 3, 1873
- Preceded by: Joseph S. Smith
- Succeeded by: Joseph G. Wilson

Member of the Oregon House of Representatives
- In office 1859–1860

Personal details
- Born: James Harvey Slater; December 28, 1826 Springfield, Illinois, U.S.
- Died: January 28, 1899 (aged 72) La Grande, Oregon, U.S.
- Resting place: Masonic Cemetery in La Grande
- Party: Democratic
- Spouse: Elizabeth Gray
- Profession: Lawyer

James Harvey Slater (December 28, 1826 – January 28, 1899) was a 19th-century American lawyer and politician who served as both a United States representative and Senator from Oregon. An Illinois native, Slater also served in the Oregon Territory's Legislature, then later the Oregon State Legislature, and was the owner of the Corvallis Union newspaper.

== Early life ==
Born near Springfield, Illinois, Sangamon County, Slater attended the local schools. In 1849 he moved to California in before settling in Corvallis, Oregon Territory in 1850. There Slater studied law and was admitted to the bar in 1854.

== Politics ==
In Corvallis he was clerk of the district court of the Territory of Oregon for Benton County from 1853 to 1856. He was a member of the Territorial assembly in 1857–1858 and was a member of the Oregon House of Representatives in from 1859 to 1860.

From 1858 to 1861 Slater published the Corvallis Union as both owner and editor. He also served as postmaster for Corvallis from 1859 to 1860 followed by law practice there until 1863 when he moved to Walla Walla, Washington.

=== Move to Oregon ===
Slater then moved to Auburn, Oregon, before settling in the Eastern Oregon town of La Grande in 1866.

In La Grande he was district attorney for the fifth judicial district of Oregon in 1868, as well as a presidential elector on the Democratic ticket.

=== Congress ===
He was elected as a Democrat to the Forty-second Congress (March 4, 1871 – March 3, 1873). Slater then returned to law practice in La Grande. He returned to politics in 1878 and was elected to the U.S. Senate and served from March 4, 1879, to March 3, 1885.

== Later life and family ==
He resumed the practice of law in La Grande, Oregon and was a member of the State railroad commission from 1889 to 1891. In 1854 Slater married Elizabeth (Edna) Gray with whom he would father ten children including future Oregon Supreme Court justice Woodson T. Slater. James Harvey Slater died in La Grande in 1899 and was interred in the Masonic Cemetery.

U.S. House of Representatives
Preceded by Joseph S. Smith	Member of the U.S. House of Representatives from Oregon's at-large congressional district March 4, 1871 – March 3, 1873	Succeeded by Joseph G. Wilson
U.S. Senate
Preceded by John H. Mitchell	U.S. senator (Class 3) from Oregon; March 4, 1879 – March 3, 1885; Served alongside: La Fayette Grover, Joseph N. Dolph	Succeeded by John H. Mitchell
