= Alonzo A. Skinner =

American judge

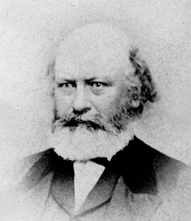

16th Justice of the Oregon Supreme Court
- In office 1866–1867
- Appointed by: George Lemuel Woods
- Preceded by: Riley E. Stratton
- Succeeded by: John Kelsay

Personal details
- Born: January 16, 1814 Portage County, Ohio, U.S.
- Died: April 30, 1877 (aged 63) Santa Barbara, California, U.S.
- Spouse: Elizabeth Hopkins Lincoln (1811–1894)

Alonzo Albert Skinner (January 16, 1814 – April 30, 1877) was an American judge and Whig party politician in Oregon. He was the 16th justice of the Oregon Supreme Court and unsuccessful candidate for the office of governor. He also served as a circuit court judge for the state of Oregon, was a customs collector, a judge in the Provisional Government of Oregon, and a commissioner on a Native American treaty commission.

== Early life ==
Skinner was born in Portage County, Ohio in 1814. There in the community of Ravenna he read law and passed the bar in 1840. He then settled in Putnam County, Ohio in 1842 and served as a part-time prosecutor there before losing the election for county judge. Then in 1845 Skinner set out over the Oregon Trail on a seven-month journey to immigrate to Oregon Country. He arrived in Oregon City, Oregon in 1845. Alonzo then set up farming in the Tuality District while still practicing law.

== Political career ==
Beginning in December 1846 Skinner, served as a circuit judge for the Provisional Government of Oregon. In that position he would travel from March through November to the county courts as a circuit rider. He was paid a salary of $800 per year for the job and served until 1849 when the Territorial Government arrived and judge Orville C. Pratt took over for Skinner. Later in 1849 Native Americans attacked and killed an American settler at Fort Steilacoom in Lewis County, after which chief justice William P. Bryant traveled to the fort for a trial of six defendants. Bryant brought along Skinner to serve as the prosecutor, and two of the six defendants were convicted and executed.

In June 1850, Skinner became a member of an Indian Commission established by the United States government to negotiate treaties with the tribes west of the Cascade Mountains in Oregon. The commission was established to guarantee the provisions of the Donation Land Claim Act, which allowed white or mixed native-white settlers to lay legal claim to up to 640 acres (2.6 km^{2}) of worked land in the Oregon Territory. The government wanted lands west of the Cascades for settlement and sought to push Native American tribes into Eastern Oregon. Skinner, alongside fellow commissioners John P. Gaines and Beverly S. Allen, negotiated the sale of native lands to the federal government, though they refused to relocate, and remained in the foothills of the Willamette Valley. The commission's members justification for the concession was the scarcity of white workers and thus high demand for native labor. The commission negotiated 19 treaties, though none were ratified. It was abolished in February 1851.

In 1851, Alonzo Skinner was appointed as an Indian agent for Southern Oregon. In 1853 he ran against former governor Joseph Lane for the position of territorial delegate to Congress for the Oregon Territory. As a Whig party candidate, Skinner called for the construction of a transcontinental railroad, but ultimately lost the campaign. In 1856, after moving to Pacific City, Washington, he married Elizabeth Hopkins Lincoln on May 22. Hopkins was a teacher in Vermont sent by Governor Slade to Oregon City. The two would go on to teach in Astoria, Oregon. Two years later, the couple moved to Willamina, Oregon in the Yamhill Valley, where Alonzo had established a land claim in 1850. The Skinners then moved to Eugene, Oregon where Alonzo returned to law practice. While in Eugene, he served as the city's recorder and as county clerk, elected to the latter as a Republican in 1862. During the Civil War, Skinner served as an assistant provost marshal for the United States Army as a civilian.

In 1866, Skinner was appointed by Oregon Governor George Lemuel Woods to the Oregon Supreme Court to replace Riley E. Stratton, who had died in office. Skinner served on the state's highest court until 1867, when he was replaced by John Kelsay.

== Later life ==
After serving on the Supreme Court he then served as a circuit court judge for the state from 1867 to 1870. Skinner was then appointed as a customs collector for the United States at Empire City, Oregon. However, he suffered from poor health, and moved to California in 1877 in an effort to improve it. He died April 30 of that year in Santa Barbara.
