= Melvin Clark George =

American politician (1849–1933)

Melvin C. George
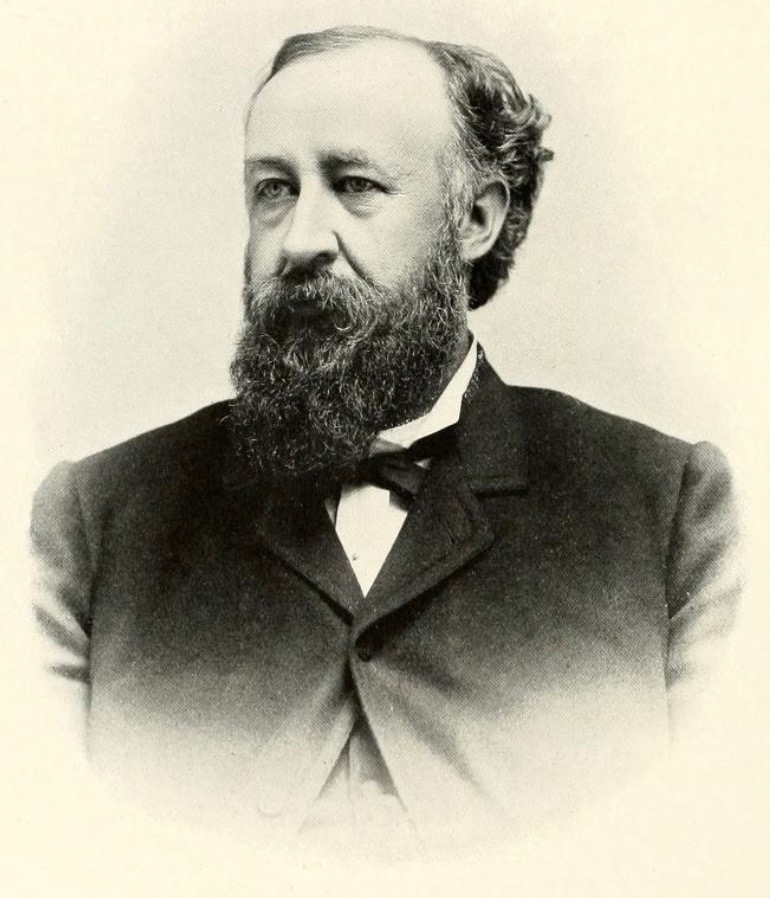

Member of the U.S. House of Representatives from Oregon's At-large district
- In office March 4, 1881 – March 3, 1885
- Preceded by: John Whiteaker
- Succeeded by: Binger Hermann

Member of the Oregon Senate
- In office 1876–1880

Personal details
- Born: Melvin Clark George; May 13, 1849 Caldwell, Ohio
- Died: February 22, 1933 (aged 83) Portland, Oregon
- Resting place: Lone Fir Cemetery
- Party: Republican
- Spouse: Mary Eckler

Melvin Clark George (May 13, 1849 – February 22, 1933) was an American lawyer, educator, and politician who served two terms as a U.S. Representative from Oregon from 1881 to 1885.

== Early life ==
He was born near Caldwell, Ohio to Presley and Mahala Nickerson George. He moved with his parents over the Oregon Trail in 1851 and settled on a homestead near Lebanon in Linn County, Oregon. In Oregon he attended country schools, then Santiam Academy, and finally Willamette University in Salem.

He served as principal of the Albany schools and the Jefferson Institute in what would become Jefferson. He studied law, and was admitted to the bar and commenced practice in Portland in 1875.

In 1873, he married Mary Eckler, with whom he had three children.

== Political career ==
George served as member of the Oregon State Senate from Multnomah County from 1876 to 1880. In 1880, he was elected as a Republican to Oregon's at-large congressional district in the United States House of Representatives, defeating incumbent John Whiteaker by 1,397 votes. In 1882, he defeated Democrat William D. Fenton by 3,365 votes to become the first Oregon congressman to be re-elected to a second term. During his term in Congress, George promoted construction of jetties at the mouth of the Columbia River. He did not seek a third term in 1884.

== After Congress ==
Following his term in Congress, George served as a professor of medical jurisprudence at Willamette University from 1885 to 1889. He then served on the Portland Public Schools board from 1889 to 1894, and in 1891 was appointed chairman of the Portland bridge commission, which sought to provide free bridges throughout the city. In this capacity, George oversaw the construction of the Burnside Bridge. George Park in the St. Johns neighborhood of Portland is named in his honor, as is George Middle School.

=== Later career and death ===
George also served as a state circuit court judge for Multnomah County from 1897 to 1905, and then practiced law in Portland until his death in Portland on February 22, 1933. He is interred at Lone Fir Cemetery.

U.S. House of Representatives
Preceded by John Whiteaker	Member of the U.S. House of Representatives from Oregon's at-large congressional district 1881-1885	Succeeded by Binger Hermann
