= John R. McBride =

American politician (1832–1904)

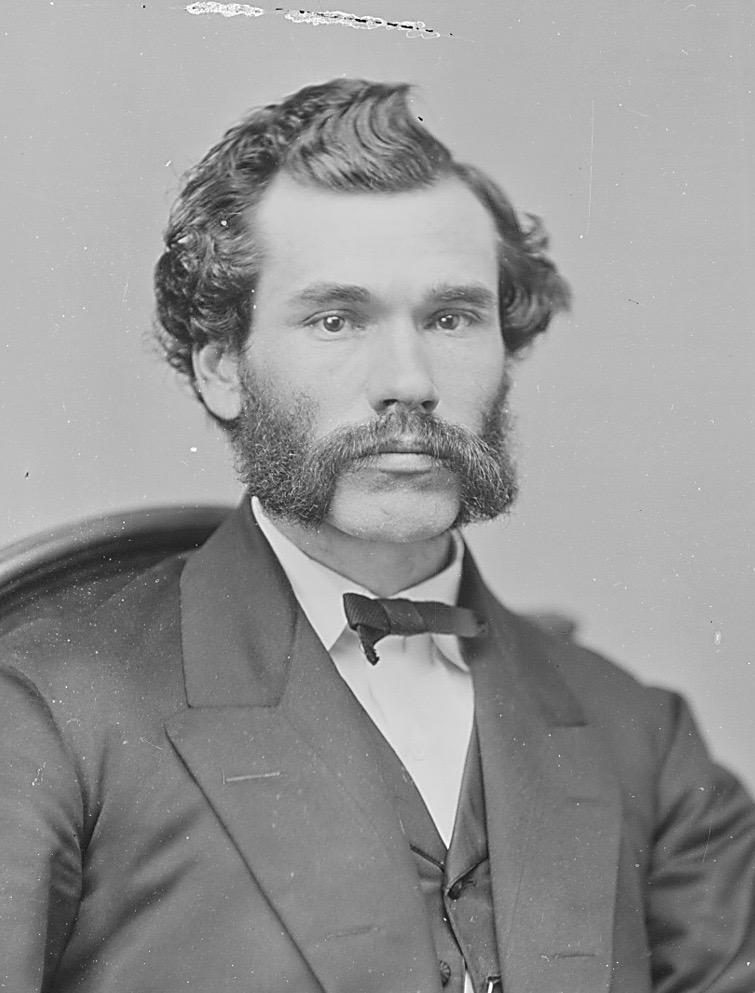

Chief Justice of the Idaho Territorial Supreme Court
- In office February 14, 1865 – April 23, 1868
- Appointed by: Abraham Lincoln
- Preceded by: Silas Woodson
- Succeeded by: Thomas J. Bowers

Member of the U.S. House of Representatives from Oregon's At-large district
- In office March 4, 1863 – March 3, 1865
- Preceded by: George K. Shiel
- Succeeded by: James H. D. Henderson

Member of the Oregon Senate
- In office 1860–1862

Personal details
- Born: James Rogers McBride; August 22, 1832 St. Louis, Missouri
- Died: July 20, 1904 (aged 71) Spokane, Washington
- Resting place: Germany Hill Cemetery in St. Helens, Oregon
- Party: Republican
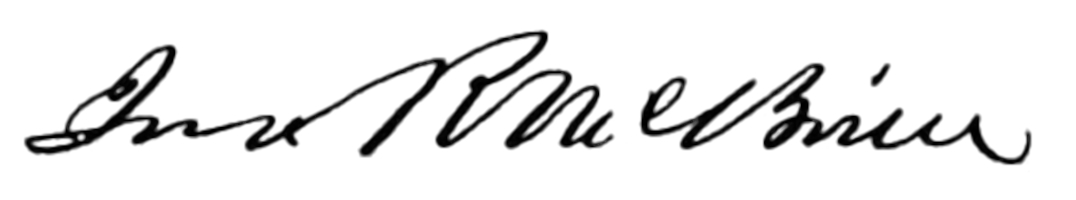
- Signature

John Rogers McBride (August 22, 1832 – July 20, 1904) was an American lawyer and politician who served one term as a Republican U.S. congressman from Oregon from 1863 to 1865.

== Early life ==
McBride was born near St. Louis, Missouri in 1832, the son of James McBride. In 1851, he moved with his family to Lafayette, Oregon, where he became the superintendent of schools at the age of 22. He studied law and after being admitted to the bar in 1855, he began a law practice in Lafayette.

== Oregon politics ==
In 1857, he served in the Oregon Constitutional Convention representing Yamhill County. In 1860, he was elected to the Oregon Senate, and to the United States House of Representatives as a Republican in 1862. He served one term, and after unsuccessfully seeking the Republican party's nomination for a second term in 1864, he was nominated as Chief Justice of Idaho Territory by President Lincoln on January 28, 1864. He was confirmed by the senate on February 14, 1865, and resigned on April 23, 1868.

=== Grant administration ===
In 1869, President Grant named him superintendent of the United States assay office in Boise, Idaho. He was a member of Republican National Committee from the Idaho Territory in 1872, and a member of Republican National Committee from Washington from 1880 to 1892.

== Later career and death ==
He practiced law in Boise and in Salt Lake City, Utah before moving his practice to Spokane, Washington, where he died in 1904. He was interred at Germany Hill Cemetery in St. Helens, Oregon.

== Family ==
McBride's youngest brother, George W. McBride, served as a United States senator from Oregon. His other younger brother Thomas A. McBride was the chief justice of the Oregon Supreme Court three times.

U.S. House of Representatives
Preceded by George K. Shiel	Member of the U.S. House of Representatives from Oregon's at-large congressional district March 4, 1863–March 3, 1865	Succeeded by James H. D. Henderson
