= James Henry Dickey Henderson =

American politician

James H. D. Henderson
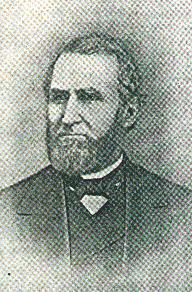

Member of the U.S. House of Representatives from Oregon's At-large district
- In office March 4, 1865 – March 3, 1867
- Preceded by: John R. McBride
- Succeeded by: Rufus Mallory

Personal details
- Born: James Henry Dickey Henderson resting_place = Odd Fellows Cemetery; July 23, 1810 Salem, Kentucky
- Died: December 13, 1885 (aged 75) Eugene, Oregon
- Party: Republican
- Spouse: Mary E. Fisher

James Henry Dickey Henderson (July 23, 1810 – December 13, 1885) was an American farmer and politician from the state of Oregon. A native of Kentucky, he lived in Missouri and Pennsylvania before moving to the Oregon Territory in 1852. He worked as a publisher, pastor, and farmer before entering politics as a Republican, and served one term in the United States House of Representatives representing Oregon.

== Early life ==
Born near Salem, Kentucky, Henderson moved to Missouri Territory in 1817 where he attended the public schools. He entered the ministry and was pastor of a church in Washington County, Pennsylvania, from 1843 to 1851. In 1851, he returned to Missouri and published a literary magazine.

== The Oregon Trail ==
A strong abolitionist, Henderson decided to leave Missouri, where slavery was allowed, and move to Oregon Territory. He, his wife, and five children endured an arduous six-month journey on the Oregon Trail and arrived in Portland, Oregon, on October 12, 1852. The family established a homestead claim in Yamhill County, where they lived for four years before resettling in Eugene and establishing fruit orchards. Prior to moving to Eugene, he served on the committee that helped to establish Columbia College, which opened in 1856 in Eugene.

== Political career ==
In 1858, Henderson was elected superintendent of Lane County schools, and then was nominated by the Republican Party as its candidate to represent Oregon in the United States House of Representatives. Henderson went on to defeat Democrat Colonel James K. Kelly in the general election. In Congress, Henderson served on the committees on the Pacific Railroad, Mines and Mining, Indian Affairs, and the special committee on the death of President Lincoln.

=== Later career ===
Henderson was not renominated by his party in 1866, and returned to his agricultural pursuits in Eugene. He also continued to preach, lecture, and write.

=== Death and burial ===
He died in Eugene on December 13, 1885, and was interred in Odd Fellows Cemetery.

U.S. House of Representatives
| Preceded by John R. McBride | Member of the U.S. House of Representatives from Oregon's at-large congressional district March 4, 1865 – March 3, 1867 | Succeeded by Rufus Mallory |
