= John Whiteaker =

American politician (1820–1902)

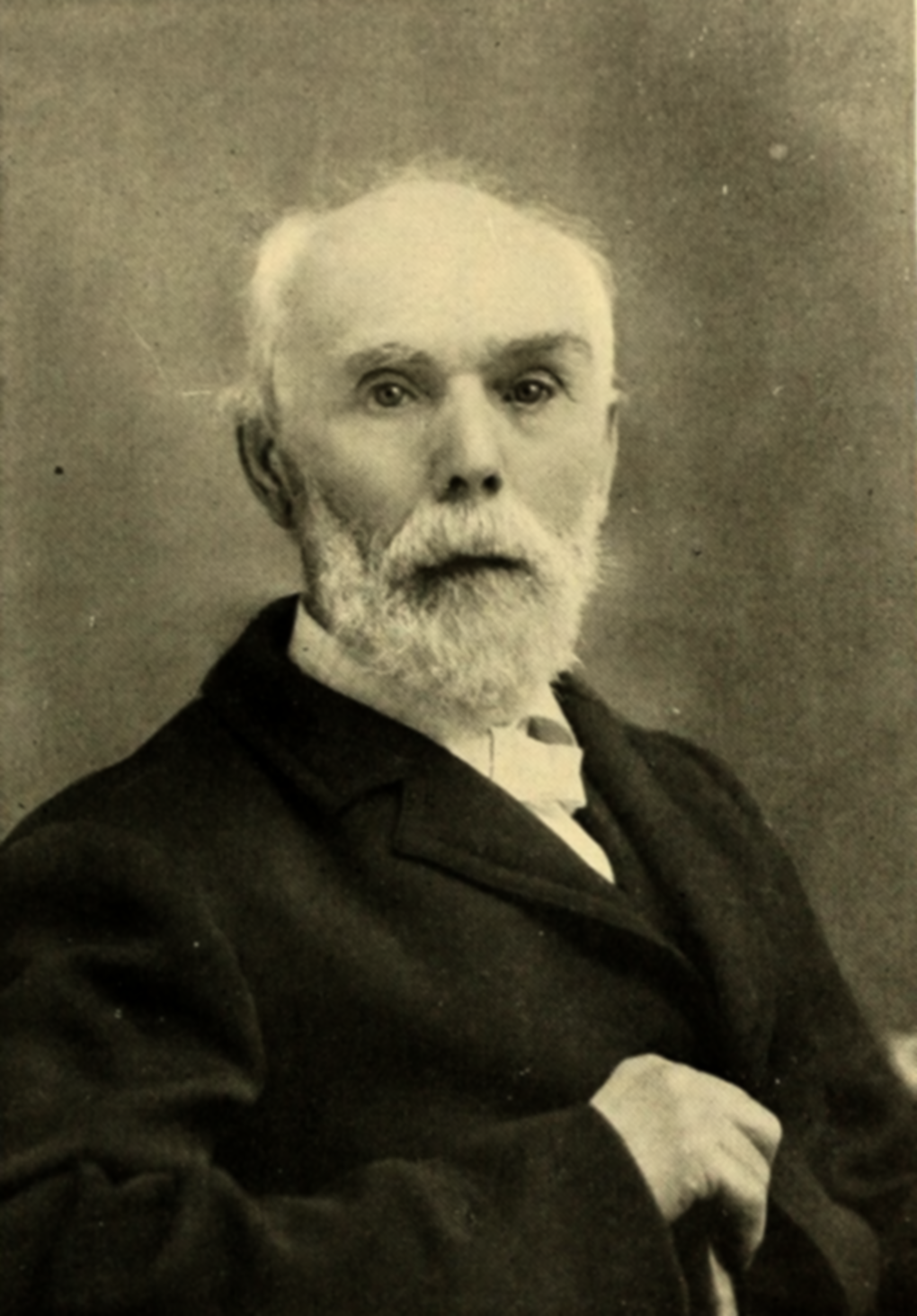

1st Governor of Oregon
- In office July 8, 1858 – September 10, 1862
- Preceded by: George Law Curry as Territorial Governor
- Succeeded by: A. C. Gibbs

Member of the U.S. House of Representatives from Oregon's at-large district
- In office March 4, 1879 – March 3, 1881
- Preceded by: Richard Williams
- Succeeded by: Melvin Clark George

6th Speaker of the Oregon House of Representatives
- In office 1868–1869
- Preceded by: Francis A. Chenoweth
- Succeeded by: Benjamin Hayden

President of the Oregon State Senate
- In office 1876–1879
- Preceded by: Robert B. Cochran
- Succeeded by: Solomon Hirsch

Personal details
- Born: May 4, 1820 Dearborn County, Indiana, US
- Died: October 2, 1902 (aged 82) Eugene, Oregon, US
- Party: Democratic
- Spouse: Nancy Jane Whiteaker
- Children: 6
- Profession: Farmer
- Inaugurated in 1858, but did not assume office until statehood bill passed in February 1859.

John Whiteaker (May 4, 1820 – October 2, 1902) was an American politician, soldier, and judge. A native of Indiana, he joined the army during the Mexican–American War and then prospected during the California Gold Rush. After moving to the Oregon Territory, he served as a judge and member of the legislature. A Democrat, Whiteaker served as the first state governor of Oregon from 1859 until 1862 and later was Oregon's Representative from 1879 to 1881. He also was president of the Oregon State Senate and Speaker of the Oregon House of Representatives.

== Early life ==
John Whiteaker was born in Dearborn County in the southeast corner of Indiana to farmers on May 4, 1820. His parents were John and Nancy (née Smales), and he had four siblings. Growing up he only received six months of formal schooling and as a result, was almost entirely self-educated. Before moving West, he had performed odd jobs, carpentry, and volunteered for military service during the Mexican War, although his unit was never called into battle.

== Career ==
=== Gold Rush ===
In 1849, he joined the California Gold Rush, earning enough to move his family to Oregon. After arriving in Oregon in 1852, he settled the family on a farm in the southern portion of the Willamette Valley in Lane County. There he became active in Democratic Party activities, and was elected to office first as judge of the Probate Court for Lane County in 1856. Whiteaker then was elected as a legislator in the Territorial Legislature in 1857 representing Lane County in the House of Representatives.

=== Governor of Oregon ===
Oregon was preparing for statehood in 1857, as voters had just approved a state constitution. Whiteaker was selected as a Democratic faction's nominee in the first state gubernatorial election, held in June 1858. Whiteaker won by a margin of 1,138, and was inaugurated July 8, 1858. He did not assume office until word that Congress had passed Oregon's statehood bill on February 14, 1859. Technically, Oregon had two governors in the interim, as Territorial Governor George Law Curry was legally in charge until the state government-in-waiting was legally empowered to take control.

Once in office, the new governor set out to untangle the large amounts of land claims and counter claims on public lands. He also promoted economic policies favoring home industries, products that Oregonians could make self-sufficiently. Although nicknamed "Honest John", this did not deflect his controversial stands on issues of national importance. Whiteaker held pro-slavery views which did not sit well with a population that largely opposed slavery in Oregon. Opponents often used this to attack him as a traitor as the United States descended into the Civil War.

Prior to 1864, individual states were responsible for picking their own date to celebrate Thanksgiving. In 1859, Governor Whiteaker proclaimed the fourth Thursday of December as the Thanksgiving holiday for Oregon.

During his final year as governor in 1861, Republican U.S. Senator Edward Baker was killed in the Battle of Ball's Bluff and Whiteaker appointed Democratic Party stalwart Benjamin Stark to fill the remainder of Baker's term.

Whiteaker was not nominated again by the Democrats in the 1862 election, and thus left office. He stayed in local politics, winning three terms as a state representative (1866–1870), and election to the state senate in 1876. During the 1868 session, he served as Speaker of the Oregon House of Representatives. He also was president of the Oregon Senate during the 1876 and 1878 sessions.

=== Election to Congress and "Whiteaker's Ride" ===
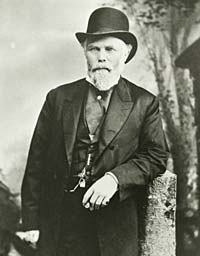
John Whiteaker

Whiteaker was elected to Congress in 1878, as Oregon's Representative-at large. The Democrats had been weakened in the House, and needed one vote to prevail in their nominee for Speaker of the House. The vote was needed by March 18, 1879. Whiteaker, already on his way to Washington, received word of this urgency while on a steamer between Portland and San Francisco. Upon docking in San Francisco on March 12, he was met by a railroad agent, and rushed to a special Central Pacific Railroad express train at Oakland. The regular transcontinental train was 25 hours out of Oakland, but Whiteaker's train managed to catch up with it. He arrived in Washington on the morning of March 18, in enough time to be promptly seated by Congress and cast his vote.

The trip cost $1500 at the time, an expense widely criticized by the Democrat's political opposition and the media. Many referred to it as "Whiteaker's ride".

In 1880, Whiteaker ran for re-election to Congress, but was defeated by Republican Melvin Clark George by 1,379 votes. Following his defeat, he retired to his farm near Eugene.

=== Later life ===
John Whiteaker was called back into politics one more time, in 1885 when President Grover Cleveland appointed him as Oregon's Collector of Revenues at the U.S. Customs House in Portland. He moved back to Eugene after 1890, purchasing 10 city blocks in the central city. The plat, Whiteaker's Addition, is commonly known as the Whiteaker neighborhood.

== Personal life ==
On August 22, 1847, he married Nancy Jane Hargrave and they had six children.

Whiteaker remained in Eugene, Oregon until his death on October 2, 1902. He is buried there in the Masonic Cemetery. Whiteaker Elementary School is named in his honor, as is Whiteaker, a neighborhood in downtown Eugene.

Political offices
Preceded by Office created	Governor of Oregon; 1858–1862	Succeeded by A. C. Gibbs
U.S. House of Representatives
Preceded by Richard Williams	Member of the U.S. House of Representatives from Oregon's at-large congressional district March 4, 1879 – March 3, 1881	Succeeded by Melvin Clark George
