= Oregon's at-large congressional district =

Former congressional district of the USA

Coordinates: 44°N 120.5°W

- Obsolete district
- Created: 1859
- Eliminated: 1890
- Years active: 1859-1893

Oregon's at-large congressional district is a former United States congressional district. During its existence, Oregon voters elected a Representative of the United States House of Representatives at-large from the entire state.

== History ==
The district came into existence when the U.S. state of Oregon was admitted to the Union on February 14, 1859. Its first representative, La Fayette Grover, had been elected in June 1858 in anticipation of statehood, but since Congress delayed action until February 1859, Grover served only 17 days as Representative.

The district ceased to exist after the 1890 U.S. census apportioned another representative to Oregon beginning with the 53rd United States Congress which convened on March 3, 1893. Binger Hermann was Oregon's last at-large Representative. He represented Oregon's 1st congressional district beginning in 1893.

== List of members representing the district ==
District was established when Oregon reached statehood.

Member	Party	Dates	Cong ress	Electoral history
District established February 14, 1859
La Fayette Grover (Salem)	Democratic	February 14, 1859 – March 3, 1859	35th	Elected to the current term in 1858. Retired.
Lansing Stout (Portland)	Democratic	March 4, 1859 – March 3, 1861	36th	Elected to the next term in 1858. Lost renomination.
Andrew J. Thayer (Corvallis)	Democratic	March 4, 1861 – July 30, 1861	37th	Elected November 6, 1860. On July 30, 1861, the House ruled that this election was not valid and seated the winner of the June 4, 1860 election.
George K. Shiel (Salem)	Democratic	July 30, 1861 – March 3, 1863	37th	Elected June 4, 1860 and seated July 30, 1861. Retired.
John R. McBride (Lafayette)	Republican	March 4, 1863 – March 3, 1865	38th	Elected in 1862. Lost renomination.
James H. D. Henderson (Eugene City)	Republican	March 4, 1865 – March 3, 1867	39th	Elected in 1864. Lost renomination.
Rufus Mallory (Salem)	Republican	March 4, 1867 – March 3, 1869	40th	Elected in 1866. Retired.
Joseph S. Smith (Portland)	Democratic	March 4, 1869 – March 3, 1871	41st	Elected in 1868. Retired.
James H. Slater (La Grande)	Democratic	March 4, 1871 – March 3, 1873	42nd	Elected in 1870. Retired.
Joseph Gardner Wilson (The Dalles)	Republican	March 4, 1873 – July 2, 1873	43rd	Elected in 1872. Died.
Vacant		July 3, 1873 – November 30, 1873	43rd	
James W. Nesmith (Rickreall)	Democratic	December 1, 1873 – March 3, 1875	43rd	Elected to finish Wilson's term. Retired.
George Augustus La Dow (Pendleton)	Democratic	March 4, 1875 – May 1, 1875	44th	Elected in 1874. Died.
Vacant		May 2, 1875 – October 25, 1875	44th	
Lafayette Lane (Roseburg)	Democratic	October 25, 1875 – March 3, 1877	44th	Elected to finish La Dow's term. Lost re-election.
Richard Williams (Portland)	Republican	March 4, 1877 – March 3, 1879	45th	Elected in 1876. Retired.
John Whiteaker (Pleasant Hill)	Democratic	March 4, 1879 – March 3, 1881	46th	Elected in 1878. Lost re-election.
Melvin Clark George (Portland)	Republican	March 4, 1881 – March 3, 1885	47th 48th	Elected in 1880. Re-elected in 1882. Retired.
Binger Hermann (Roseburg)	Republican	March 4, 1885 – March 3, 1893	49th 50th 51st 52nd	Elected in 1884. Re-elected in 1886. Re-elected in 1888. Re-elected in 1890. Redistricted to the 1st district.
District dissolved March 3, 1893
