= James K. Kelly =

American judge (1819–1903)

James Kerr Kelly
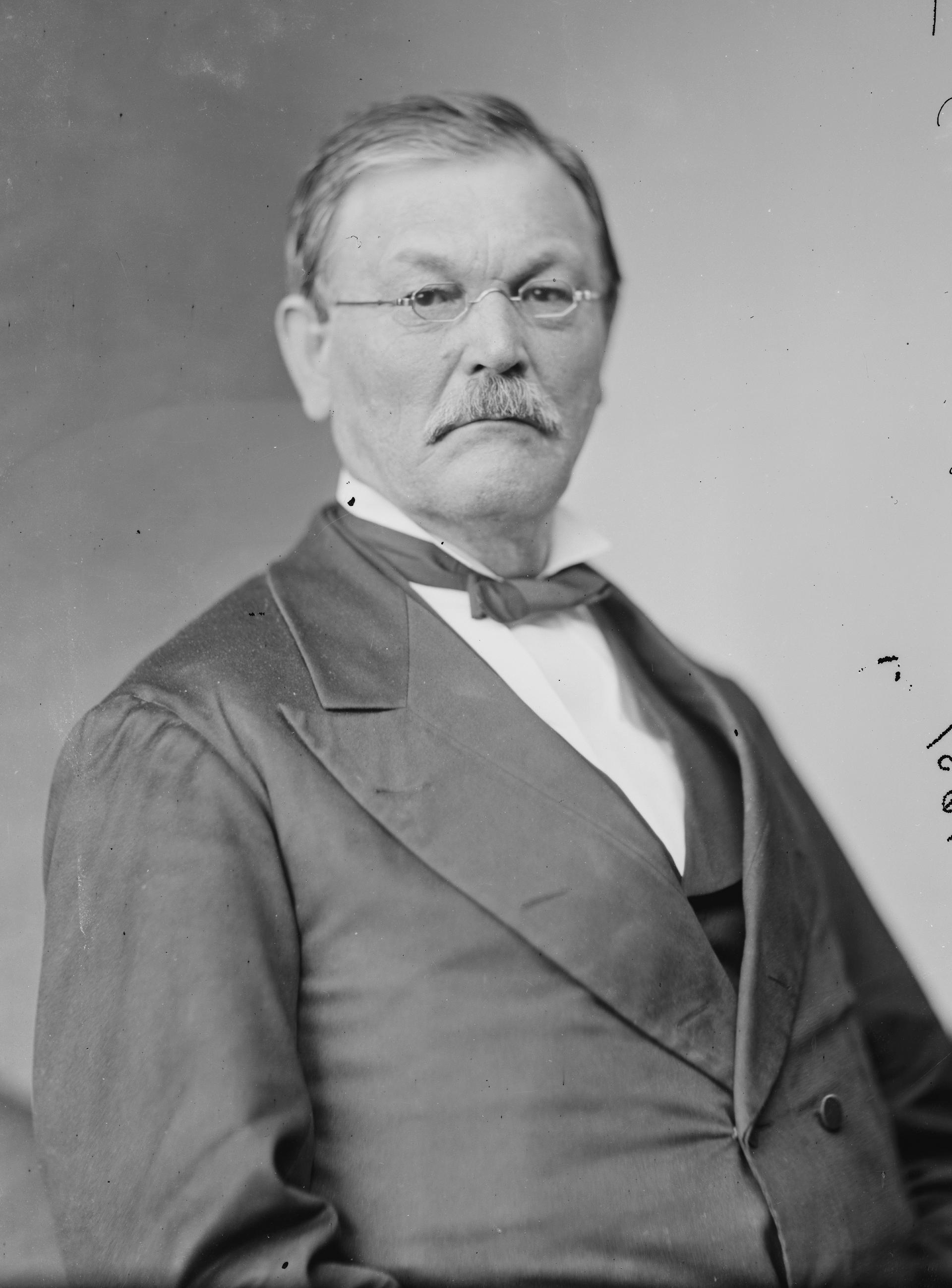

10th Chief Justice of the Oregon Supreme Court
- In office 1878–1880
- Preceded by: Paine Page Prim
- Succeeded by: William Paine Lord

26th Justice of the Oregon Supreme Court
- In office 1878–1880
- Appointed by: Stephen F. Chadwick
- Preceded by: James F. Watson
- Succeeded by: John B. Waldo

United States Senator from Oregon
- In office March 4, 1871 – March 3, 1877
- Preceded by: George Henry Williams
- Succeeded by: La Fayette Grover

Member of the Oregon Senate
- In office 1860–1864

Personal details
- Born: February 16, 1819 Centre County, Pennsylvania, U.S.
- Died: September 15, 1903 (aged 84) Washington, D.C., U.S.
- Resting place: Rock Creek Cemetery
- Party: Democratic

James Kerr Kelly (February 16, 1819 – September 15, 1903) was an American politician who served as the United States senator from Oregon from 1871 to 1877, and later Chief Justice of the Oregon Supreme Court. Prior to his election to the Senate he had been elected to both houses of the local legislature, serving in the Territorial House and State Senate, and was a member of the Oregon Constitutional Convention in 1857.

== Early life ==
Kelly was born in Centre County, Pennsylvania, in 1819. There he attended the school at Milton, and later the Lewisburg Academies. For his higher education, the future Congressman graduated from the College of New Jersey in 1839. James Kelly then studied law in Carlisle, Pennsylvania, at the Dickinson School of Law and was admitted to practice law in Pennsylvania in 1842.

== Career ==
Upon entering the legal profession, Mr. Kelly began private practice in Lewistown, Pennsylvania, then was the deputy attorney general for Mifflin County, Pennsylvania. In 1849 he left for California and the newly discovered gold fields, then moved on to the Oregon Territory in 1851. In Oregon he set up a law practice in Portland and was one of three people selected to help re-write the laws of the territory.

== Political career ==
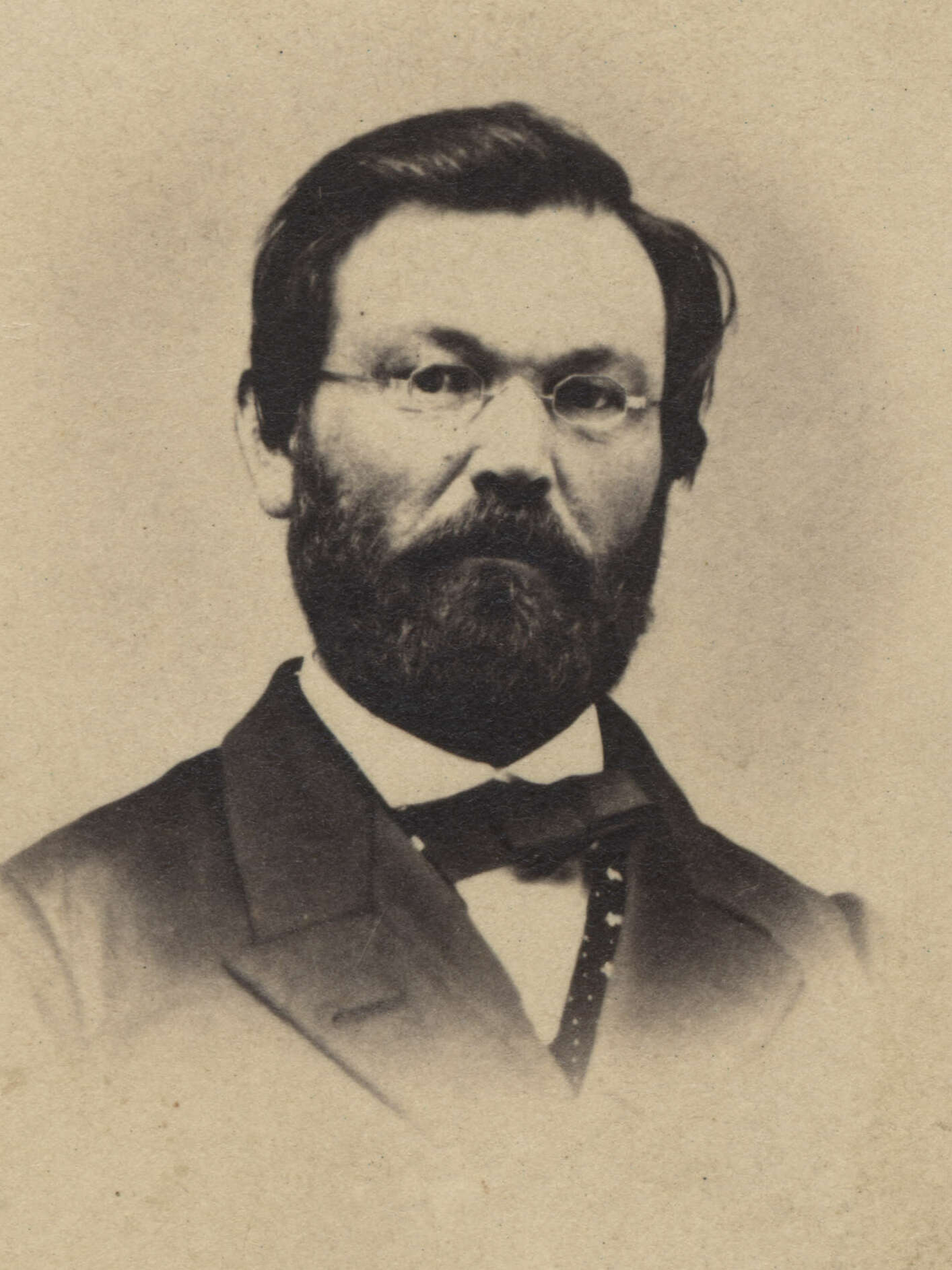
James K. Kelly, circa 1867

While living in Oregon, Kelly became active in politics and was elected as a Democrat to the territorial legislature serving from 1853 to 1857, and was selected as president of the legislature twice. In 1857, he was a member of the constitutional convention formed to prepare for Oregon's admission into the Union in 1859. Upon statehood, Kelly was elected to the Oregon State Senate and served from 1860 to 1864. In 1864, he ran for a seat in the U. S. House of Representatives, but lost to Republican James H. D. Henderson. He was also unsuccessful in running for governor in 1866. Then in 1870, he was elected to the U.S. Senate as a Democrat and served from March 4, 1871, to March 3, 1877. He did not run for re-election.

From 1878 to 1880, Kelly was a justice of the Oregon Supreme Court. He also served as chief justice of the court during that time. Kelly was appointed to the position by Governor W. W. Thayer, (along with Justices Reuben P. Boise and Paine Page Prim) as a temporary justice until elections could be held following a reorganization of the Oregon court system. Kelly was not elected to a full term after his partial term expired.

== Later life ==
After retiring from the bench, Kelly went back into private practice in Portland. In 1890 he returned to the east coast, settling in Washington, DC, where he practiced law. James Kerr Kelly died on September 15, 1903, with burial at Rock Creek Cemetery.

Party political offices
Preceded by John F. Miller	Democratic nominee for Governor of Oregon; 1866	Succeeded by La Fayette Grover
U.S. Senate
Preceded by George H. Williams	U.S. senator (Class 2) from Oregon; 1871–1877; Served alongside: Henry W. Corbett, John H. Mitchell	Succeeded by La Fayette Grover
