= Lafayette F. Mosher =

American judge

Lafayette Howe Mosher

23rd Justice of the Oregon Supreme Court
- In office 1873–1874
- Appointed by: LaFayette Grover
- Preceded by: Andrew J. Thayer
- Succeeded by: John Burnett (judge)

Personal details
- Born: September 1, 1824 Latonia Springs, Kentucky
- Died: March 27, 1890 (aged 65) Oregon
- Party: Republican
- Spouse: Winnifred Lane Mosher

Lafayette Howe Mosher (September 1, 1824 – March 27, 1890) was an American politician and judge in Oregon. He was the 23rd justice of the Oregon Supreme Court. Prior to joining the state's highest court in 1873 he served in the Oregon State Senate.

== Early life ==
Mosher was born near Latonia Springs in Kentucky on September 1, 1824. The son of Hannah Webster and her husband Stephen Mosher, Lafayette was educated in Cincinnati, Ohio at Woodward College where he received a Bachelor of Arts in 1843. He later moved to Oregon Territory.

== Oregon ==
On May 14, 1853, he arrived in Oregon. Through 1854 he was involved in a movement in Southern Oregon to create a new territory, Jackson Territory. In 1855 he was appointed as a registrar for the Southern Oregon District of the land office. Then on July 1, 1856, Mosher married the daughter of former governor Joseph Lane, Winnifred, with whom he would have eight children.

In 1870, he was appointed to the Oregon State Senate after the winner of the seat accepted a federal position and became ineligible for the legislature. Mosher served as a Republican from Douglas County. In 1873, he was appointed by Oregon Governor LaFayette Grover to the Oregon Supreme Court to replace Andrew J. Thayer who had died in office. His term then ended the following year and Mosher left the court. Lafayette Mosher died on March 27, 1890, in Roseburg, Oregon.
