= Charles Meigs =

Charles Meigs may refer to:

- Charles Delucena Meigs (1792–1869), American obstetrician
- Charles Meigs (politician) (1831–1883), American lawyer and politician, delegate to the Oregon Constitutional Convention
