= Multnomah Park Cemetery =

Historic cemetery in Portland, Oregon, U.S.

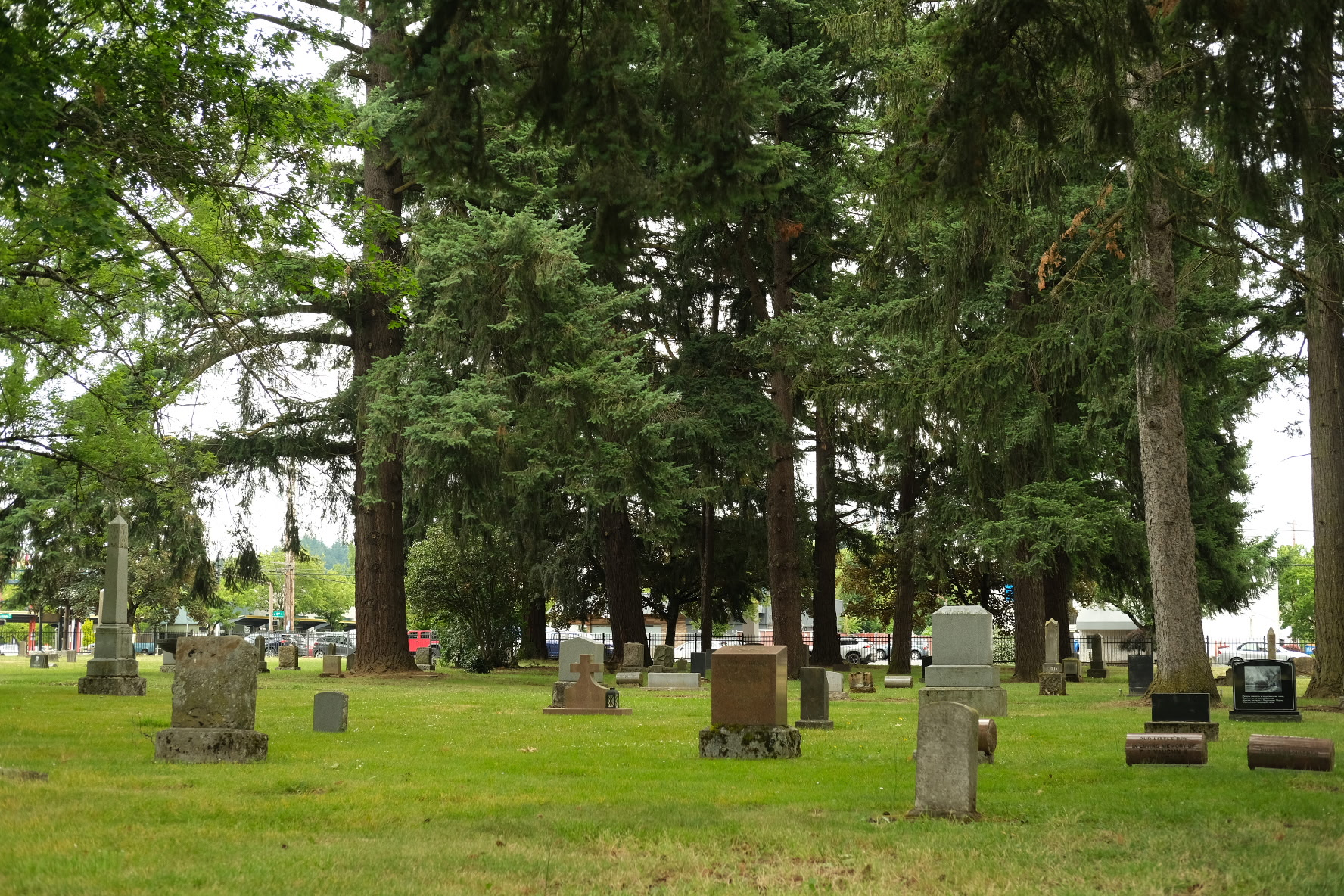
- The cemetery in 2025

Details
- Location: Portland, Oregon
- Country: United States
- Coordinates: 45°29′22″N 122°34′49″W
- Find a Grave: Multnomah Park Cemetery

Multnomah Park Cemetery is a 9-acre cemetery located at Southeast 82nd Avenue and Holgate Boulevard, in Portland, Oregon's Foster-Powell neighborhood, in the United States. It was founded in 1888.

== Notable burials ==
- Robert V. Short (1823–1908), an Oregon pioneer and delegate to the Oregon Constitutional Convention
