= John Burnett (judge) =

American judge

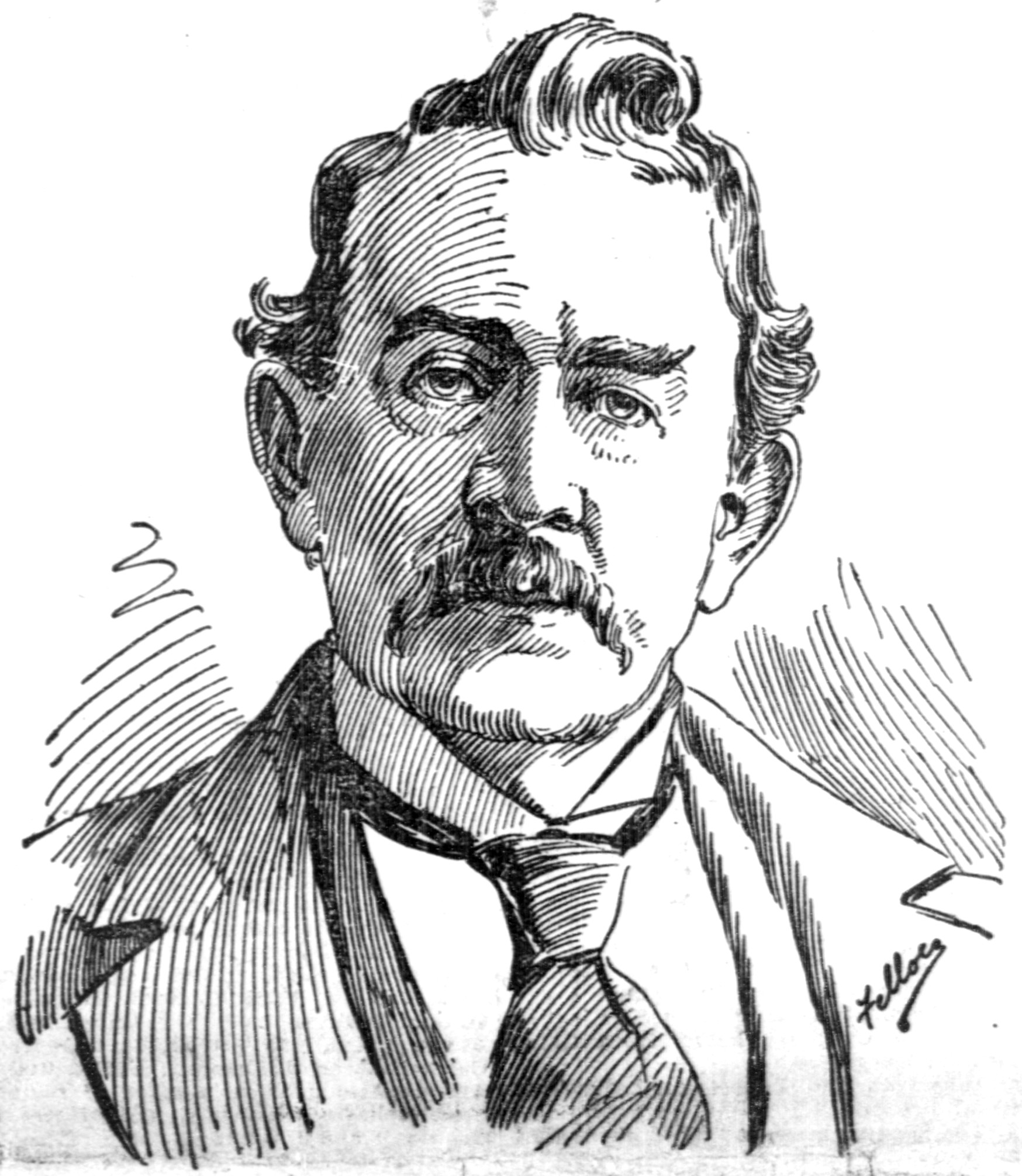

24th Justice of the Oregon Supreme Court
- In office 1874–1876
- Preceded by: Lafayette F. Moser
- Succeeded by: James F. Watson

Personal details
- Born: July 4, 1831 Louisiana, Missouri
- Died: March 1, 1901 (aged 69) Corvallis, Oregon
- Spouse: Martha Hinton

John Burnett (July 4, 1831 – March 1, 1901) was an American judge in the state of Oregon. He was the 24th associate justice of the Oregon Supreme Court. A native of Missouri, he also served as a county and circuit court judge in Oregon, and was elected to the Oregon State Senate.

== Early life ==
Burnett was born on July 4, 1831, in Louisiana, Missouri, to Jane and Benjamin Burnett. He was educated in Missouri before the family moved to California. Burnett engaged in gold mining from 1849 to 1851 before returning to Missouri. In 1853, Burnett set off for Nevada County, California, with a band of cattle and upon his arrival he returned to gold mining.

== Oregon ==
Burnett then moved north to Oregon Territory in 1858. The following year he married the former Martha Hinton and they settled in Benton County, Oregon, where they raised seven children. Burnett also studied law and began private law practice in 1860.

Then in 1870 he was elected as judge in Benton County. Next, in 1874 he won election to the Oregon Supreme Court. He left the state's high court at the end of the term in 1876. Burnett won election to the Oregon State Senate in 1878 as a Democrat from Benton County. Then in 1882 Oregon Governor Thayer appointed Burnett to the Oregon circuit court for the 2nd district. Burnett died on March 1, 1901, in Corvallis, Oregon.
