= Edward B. Watson (judge) =

American judge

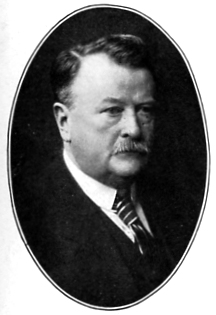
- Watson circa 1910

12th Chief Justice of the Oregon Supreme Court
- In office 1882–1884
- Preceded by: William Paine Lord
- Succeeded by: John B. Waldo

28th Justice of the Oregon Supreme Court
- In office 1880–1884
- Preceded by: Paine Page Prim
- Succeeded by: W. W. Thayer

Personal details
- Born: October 7, 1844 Garnavillo, Iowa
- Died: February 1, 1915 (aged 70) Portland, Oregon
- Spouse: Eleanor Kubli

Edward Byers Watson (October 7, 1844 – February 1, 1915) was an American jurist in the state of Oregon. He was the 12th chief justice of the Oregon Supreme Court. Watson served for four years on the state's highest court, and his brother served for two years on the court.

== Early life ==
Watson was born on October 7, 1844, in Garnavillo, Iowa, as the child of James Watson and Emily Adams Franklin Watson. His older brother James Watson who would also serve on the Oregon Supreme Court was born in 1840. The family moved to Oregon Territory in 1853 and settled in Douglas County. In Oregon Edward Watson received an education in the public schools and at Wilbur Academy. Then, in June 1866, he graduated with a Bachelor of Arts from Pacific University in Forest Grove, Oregon. He then studied law and began practicing in 1868 in Jacksonville, Oregon. Watson studied the law under the supervision of his brother.

== Legal career ==
While in Southern Oregon Watson served as a county judge for Jackson County from 1872 to 1876. Next he served as county clerk from 1878 to 1880. Then in 1880 Watson was elected to the Oregon Supreme Court to Paine Page Prim. His four-year term expired in 1884 and he left the court. During his tenure he served as chief justice from 1882 to 1884.

== Later life ==
After leaving the bench Edward Watson returned to private practice, but moved to Portland, Oregon. He had married Eleanor Kubli in Jacksonville, and the two had two daughters. Edward B. Watson died in Portland on February 1, 1915.
