= Waldo Glacier =

Glacier in Oregon, United States

- Location within Oregon
- Type: Mountain glacier
- Location: Cascade Range, Jefferson County, Oregon, U.S.
- Coordinates: 44°39′46″N 121°47′46″W
- Length: .6 mi (0.97 km)
- Terminus: Moraines/Talus
- Status: Retreating

Waldo Glacier is in the U.S. state of Oregon. The glacier is situated in the Cascade Range on the south-southeast slopes of Mount Jefferson. Starting near an elevation of 9,000 ft (2,700 m), the glacier extends down to 7,500 ft (2,300 m). The glacier is named after John B. Waldo, as is Waldo Lake.

== See also ==
- List of glaciers in the United States
