= Reuben S. Strahan =

American judge

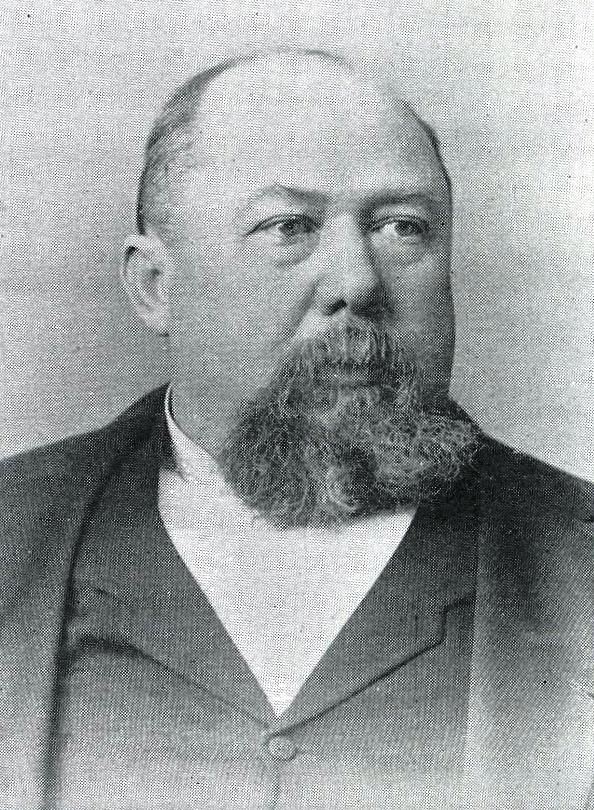

15th Chief Justice of the Oregon Supreme Court
- In office 1890–1892
- Preceded by: William Wallace Thayer
- Succeeded by: William Paine Lord

31st Justice of the Oregon Supreme Court
- In office 1886–1892
- Preceded by: John B. Waldo
- Succeeded by: Frank A. Moore

Personal details
- Born: January 1, 1835 Lawrence County, Kentucky
- Died: July 21, 1895 (aged 60)
- Spouse: Sarah H. Wilson

Reuben Scott Strahan (January 1, 1835 – July 21, 1895) was an American politician and judge in Oregon. He was the 15th Chief Justice of the state's highest court. A native of Kentucky, served on the Oregon Supreme Court for one term from 1886 until 1892, and prior to the bench served in the Oregon Legislature.

== Early life ==
Born on January 1, 1835, in Lawrence County, Kentucky, Reuben was the son of John Strahan and his wife Selah Canterbury Strahan. Reuben received his education from the Mexican Academy in Missouri. Next he studied law in Louisa, Kentucky before passing the Kentucky bar in 1858. Strahan then moved to Missouri where he became a probate judge for Sullivan County, in Milan. He served as judge from 1860 until 1864, and during this time married Sarah H. Wilson in 1861, they would have four children.

== Oregon ==
Then in 1865 Strahan moved to Oregon and took up residence in Corvallis. There he set up a law practice before becoming Benton County district attorney from 1868 to 1870. In 1870, he was elected to the Oregon State Senate. Strahan won re-election in 1872, again representing Benton County as a Republican. In 1884, Strahan was a supporter of the movement to raise money for the purchase of buildings for the Oregon Agricultural College in Corvallis. He would later serve as a regent for the school for a decade.

Following his time in the legislature, he resumed private law practice in Albany, before winning election to the Oregon Supreme Court in 1886. Strahan only served the one six-year term on the bench, but did serve as chief justice from 1890 to 1892 when he left the court due to his term expiring.

== Later life and family ==
After his time on the court Strahan would work as legal counsel for the Oregon Pacific Railroad, and also helped to organize the Farmers and Merchants Fire Insurance Company. His firstborn daughter, Jesse, died in infancy, and his second child, Fannie, died in 1892. His only son, Claude, became a lawyer, and his daughter Fayne "Pet" Moore was tried for robbery and assault in New York City along with her husband in 1898.

Strahan died in on July 21, 1895, at the age of 60.
