= Alfred S. Bennett =

American judge

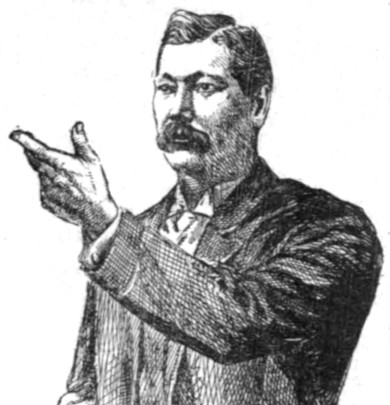
- An illustration of Bennett in 1905 by Harry Murphy for The Oregonian.

49th Justice of the Oregon Supreme Court
- In office 1919–1920
- Preceded by: Conrad P. Olson
- Succeeded by: George M. Brown

Personal details
- Born: June 10, 1854 Dubuque, Iowa
- Died: November 28, 1925 (aged 71) The Dalles, Oregon
- Spouse: Mary McCauley

Alfred Silas Bennett (June 10, 1854 – November 28, 1925) was an American judge, educator, and attorney in Oregon. He was the 49th justice of the Oregon Supreme Court, serving from 1919 to 1920. Previously he had served as a state circuit court judge and as a county school superintendent. An Iowa native, he practiced law in The Dalles, Oregon, with several cases making it to the Supreme Court of the United States.

== Early life ==
Alfred Bennett was born in Dubuque, Iowa on June 10, 1854. In 1865 he and his parents took the Oregon Trail to Oregon and settled in Washington County. By 1870 Alfred set off on his own and eventually ended up in The Dalles, Oregon where he taught and learned the law between 1873 and 1880. In 1880, he passed the bar, this was while serving as Wasco County superintendent of schools from 1878 until 1882.

== Judicial career ==
In September 1882 Alfred Bennett was appointed as judge of the 8th judicial district which covered Eastern Oregon and remained in that post for two years. He then returned to private practice and married Mary McCauley in 1887. In 1918 Bennett won election to the Oregon Supreme Court. He replaced Conrad P. Olson who was serving out the remainder of Frank A. Moore's term after Moore died in office. Alfred Bennett then resigned from the court on October 5, 1920. He then resumed private practice in The Dalles before dying on November 28, 1925.

While in private practice Bennett argued several cases in front of the Supreme Court of the United States. In 1896 Bennett represented Jane Skottowe in Oregon S. L. & U. N. R. Co. v. Skottowe in a personal injury lawsuit. In 1912, he represented Hamilton H. Hendricks against the government on charges of perjury in Hendricks v. United States.

== Other ==
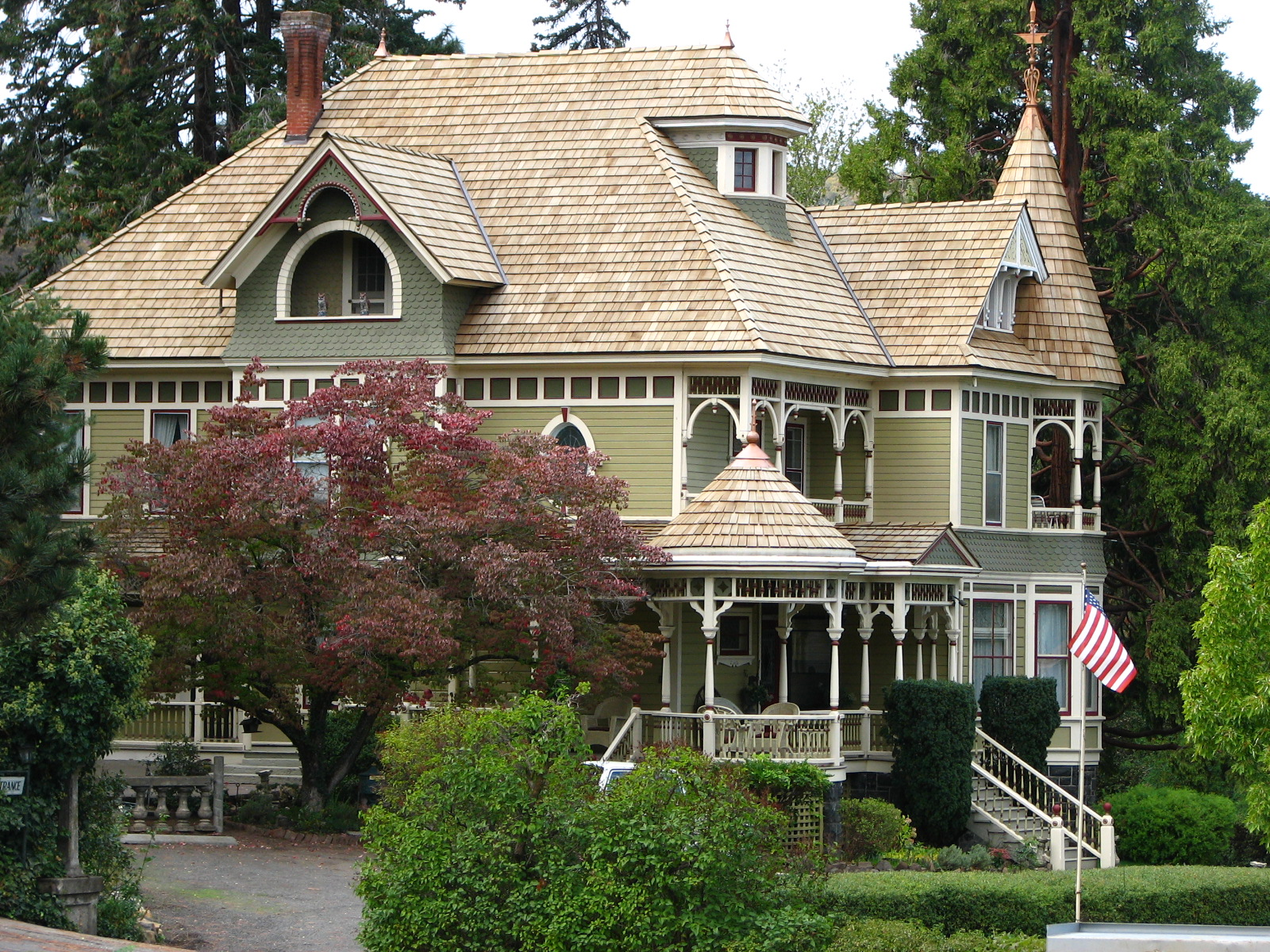
The Bennett–Williams House

Bennett and his wife had a daughter Anita Bennett who married Harold T. Hopkins, the one time owner of the local paper, The Dalles Chronicle. Alfred and his family lived in the Victorian house now known as Bennett–Williams House in The Dalles.
