= William Waldo =

William Waldo may refer to:

- William Waldo (California politician) (1812–1881)
- William Waldo (Oregon politician) (1832–1911)
