= Reuben P. Boise =

American judge

Reuben Patrick Boise
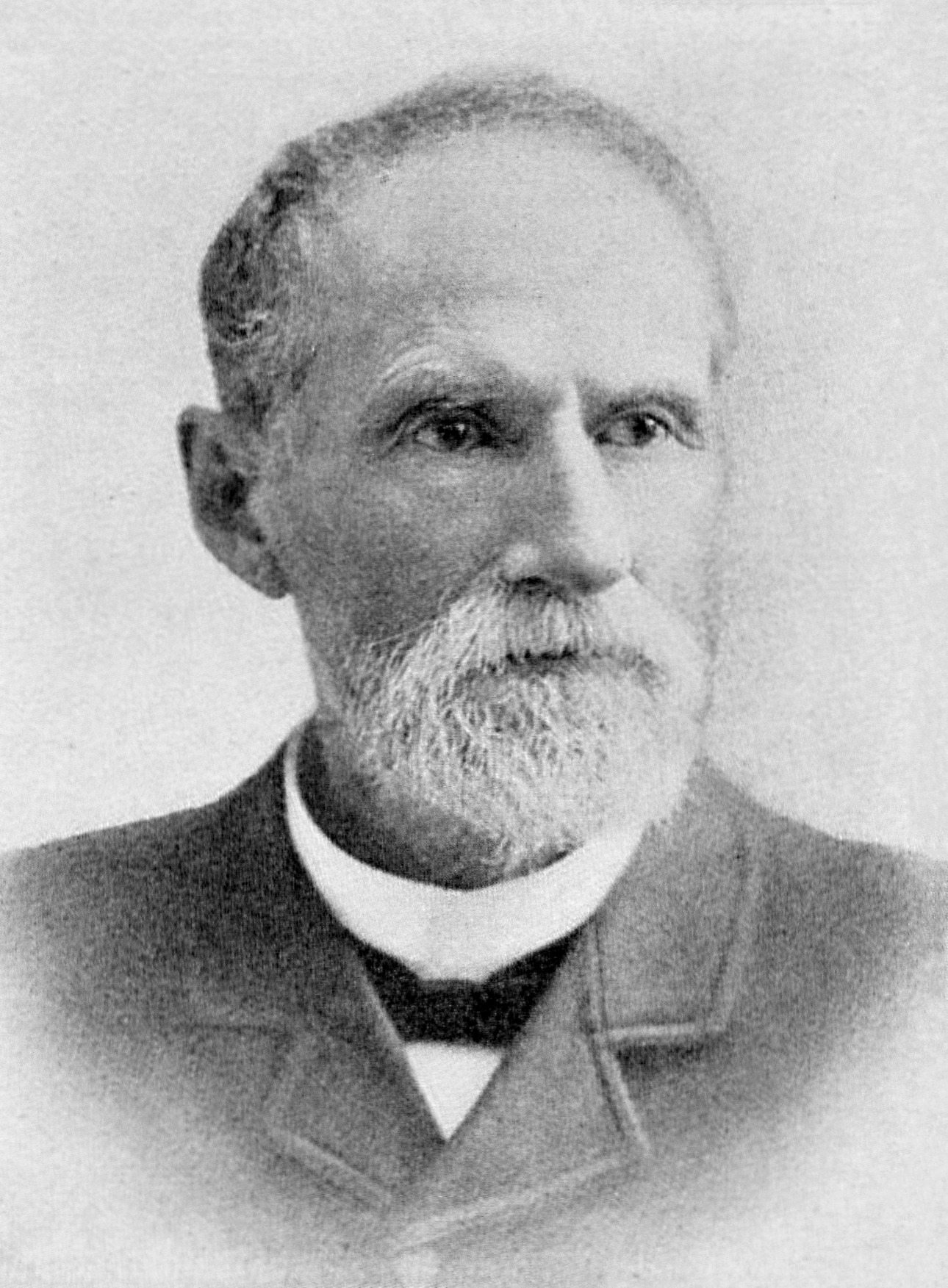

9th Justice of the Oregon Supreme Court
- In office 1858 – 1870; 1876 – 1880
- Appointed by: James Buchanan
- Preceded by: Cyrus Olney; Benjamin F. Bonham
- Succeeded by: William Paine Lord; Benjamin F. Bonham

5th Chief Justice of the Oregon Supreme Court
- In office 1864 – 1866; 1870 – 1872; 1876 – 1878
- Preceded by: Aaron E. Wait
- Succeeded by: Paine Page Prim

Personal details
- Born: June 9, 1819 Blandford, Massachusetts, U.S.
- Died: April 10, 1907 (aged 87) Salem, Oregon, U.S.
- Spouse(s): Ellen Frances Lyon; Emily A. Pratt

Reuben Patrick Boise (June 9, 1819 – April 10, 1907) was an American attorney, judge and politician in the Oregon Territory and the early years of the state of Oregon. A native of Massachusetts, he immigrated to Oregon in 1850, where he would twice serve on the Oregon Supreme Court for a total of 16 years, with three stints as chief justice. Early in his legal career, he worked as a district attorney.

Boise was a member of the Oregon Constitutional Convention in 1857, served in the Territorial Legislature, and helped to codify the laws of the Oregon Territory. He also served as a circuit court judge, and was a trustee at several colleges. Educated at Williams College, he was twice married to women from Massachusetts, and had a total of five children.

== Early life ==
Reuben Boise was born in Blandford, Massachusetts, on June 9, 1819, to Reuben Boise and Sally Putnam Boise. He attended Williams College in Williamstown, Massachusetts, graduating with honors in 1843 with a Bachelor of Arts degree. Upon graduation, he moved to Missouri, where he taught school for two years before returning to Massachusetts. When Boise returned, he studied law under his uncle for three years, passing the bar in 1847. He practiced law for a few years in Chickopee Falls, Massachusetts.

== Oregon ==
In 1850, Boise decided to move to the Oregon Territory. To get there, he traveled by ship to Panama and crossed the Isthmus of Panama to the Pacific Ocean. He took another ship, arriving in Astoria, Oregon, at the mouth of the Columbia River later that year. In the spring of 1851, he moved upriver to Portland and set up a law practice and was one of the first Portland Public Schools board members from 1851 to 1852. In 1851, Boise married Ellen Francis Lyon of Boston while in San Francisco, California. Boise had become engaged to her in Massachusetts, with her and her family sailing around Cape Horn to attend the wedding. Reuben and Ellen had three sons – Reuben P. Boise, Jr., Whitney L., and Fisher A. – before Ellen died in 1865.

Also in 1851, he was appointed by Oregon Supreme Court justice Orville C. Pratt as a district attorney. In 1852, he purchased some land in Polk County, Oregon, and renamed the community there Ellendale after his wife. In 1857, the Boise family moved to Salem, Oregon. In 1867, Boise married Miss Emily A. Pratt who hailed from Webster, Massachusetts. The couple had two daughters, Ellen S. and Marie E. Boise.

== Political career ==
In 1852, the Oregon Territorial Legislature selected Boise to be the prosecuting attorney for Districts 1 and 2, which covered most of the Willamette Valley. He was selected again the following year and served a total of four years in that capacity. In 1853, he represented Polk and Tillamook counties in the Territorial Legislature as a Democratic Party politician in the lower chamber House of Representatives. The following year, he was selected to help codify Oregon's laws, along with James K. Kelly and Daniel R. Bigelow. In 1857, Boise was a Democratic delegate to the Oregon Constitutional Convention from Polk County. While serving at the Constitutional Convention, Boise served on the Legislation Committee.

In 1857, Boise was appointed to the Territorial Supreme Court by U.S. President James Buchanan to replace Cyrus Olney, beginning service in 1858. He was then elected to the Oregon Supreme Court in 1859 after Oregon became a state on February 14, 1859. Justice Boise served until 1870, winning re-election in 1864. After winning re-election in 1870, he resigned when the election results were contested. Boise was elected to the commission overseeing the construction of the Oregon State Capitol in 1874.

In 1876, he returned to the Oregon Supreme Court after winning the election. Two years later, the Oregon Legislative Assembly divided the court into the Supreme Court and the Oregon Circuit Court, and reduced the number of justices on the Supreme Court to three. With the new court, all prior judges lost their seats and the three positions were filled by appointment of the governor. Boise was appointed by Governor W. W. Thayer to the new court in 1878, with his term ending in 1880. During his time with the court, he served as chief justice three times; from 1864 to 1866, 1870 to 1872, and 1876 to 1878.

After leaving the state's highest court, he was elected as a state circuit court judge for Oregon's third judicial district in 1880, covering Yamhill, Tillamook, Marion, Linn, and Polk counties. He served on the court until 1892, and then entered private legal practice. After six years in private practice in Salem, Boise returned to the circuit court in 1898. He retired from the court in July 1904.

== Later life and legacy ==
Judge Boise has probably done more than any other man to systematize the practice of law in this state and to raise it to a high standard. He was a man whose ability and integrity were recognized by every one who knew him. His work speaks louder than words and stands as a monument to his glory.

— Oregon Supreme Court Justice Frank A. Moore

In his later years, Boise served on the board of trustees at Willamette University in Salem and Pacific University in Forest Grove. Pacific gave him an honorary doctor of laws degree. Additionally, he was a trustee at the La Creole Academy preparatory school in Dallas and a regent of the Oregon Agricultural College (now Oregon State University). He also spent five terms as the master of the state grange association, and owned the Ellendale Woolen Mill. A public speaker, he gave speeches for the Oregon Historical Society, the Oregon Pioneer Society, and the Oregon State Bar as well as at the dedication of a monument to missionary Jason Lee.

Reuben Patrick Boise died on April 10, 1907, at the age of 87 in Salem, and is buried at Salem Pioneer Cemetery. Former U.S. Attorney General George Henry Williams gave the eulogy at the funeral, with many prominent politicians and officials in attendance. In honor of the former judge, the state courts adjourned for the day. At the time of his death, Boise owned more than 2,600 acres (11 km^{2}) of farmland spread across three farms in Marion and Polk counties. Reuben Boise road in Polk County is named in his honor, as is the R. P. Boise Building in Salem, listed on the National Register of Historic Places.

== Works ==
- "Fifty Years Reminiscences of the Bench and Bar: Speech to the Oregon Bar Association, Nov. 19, 1902," Weekly Oregon Statesman [Salem], Nov. 21, 1902, pp. 6, 8.
