= Erasmus D. Shattuck =

American judge

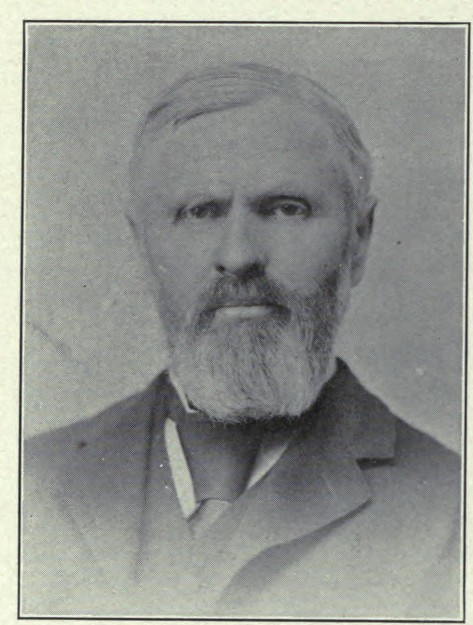

7th Chief Justice of the Oregon Supreme Court
- In office 1866–1867
- Preceded by: Paine Page Prim
- Succeeded by: Reuben P. Boise

14th Justice of the Oregon Supreme Court
- In office 1862–1867 and 1874–1878
- Preceded by: William W. Page, William W. Upton
- Succeeded by: William W. Upton, position eliminated

Personal details
- Born: December 31, 1824 Bakersfield, Vermont
- Died: July 26, 1900 (aged 75) Portland, Oregon
- Spouse: Sarah A. Armstrong

Erasmus Darwin Shattuck (December 31, 1824 – July 26, 1900) was an American politician and judge in the state of Oregon. He served as the 7th Chief Justice of the Oregon Supreme Court serving from 1866 to 1867. He served two separate terms on the Oregon's high court, was a district attorney, and a member of the Oregon Constitutional Convention in 1857.

== Early life ==
In Bakersfield, Vermont, on December 31, 1824, Erasmus Shattuck was born to Oliver and Sally Start Shattuck. Erasmus graduated from the University of Vermont in 1848 and then taught in Maryland and Georgia. In 1852 he was admitted to the New York state bar association. Also in 1852 he married Sarah A. Armstrong, and the two would have six children.

Then in 1853 he immigrated to what was then the Oregon Territory via the Isthmus of Panama. He arrived on February 15, 1853, and began teaching at Oregon City College and the Clackamas County Female Seminary until 1855. That year he began teaching at Pacific University in Forest Grove, Oregon. From 1855 to 1856 he served as Washington County School Superintendent.

== Legal career ==
In 1856, Shattuck was elected to be a probate judge as he had been practicing law in Portland, Oregon. Then in 1857 he was a delegate to Oregon's Constitutional Convention representing Washington County. In 1861, he was a district attorney, and from 1862 to 1863 was the United States Attorney for Oregon.

Shattuck was then elected in 1862 to the Oregon Supreme Court. During this time on the court he served as chief justice from 1866 to 1867. He resigned from the bench in December 1867 and was replaced by William W. Upton. Shattuck was then elected a second time to the court in 1874 to replace Upton, and then left the bench in 1878 at the end of his term. After his time on the high court, Shattuck returned to the bench as a circuit court judge from 1886 to 1898.

== Later years ==
Shattuck served as a trustee for Portland Academy and was one of the founders of the Portland Library.

Erasmus Shattuck died in Portland on July 26, 1900.

== Legacy ==
In Portland, both Shattuck School and Road are named for him.

At Portland State University, Shattuck Hall is named for him.
