= John B. Waldo =

American judge

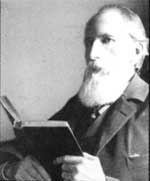

13th Chief Justice of the Oregon Supreme Court
- In office 1884–1886
- Preceded by: Edward B. Watson
- Succeeded by: William Paine Lord

29th Justice of the Oregon Supreme Court
- In office 1880–1886
- Preceded by: James K. Kelly
- Succeeded by: Reuben S. Strahan

Personal details
- Born: October 6, 1844 Salem, Oregon
- Died: September 2, 1907 (aged 62)
- Spouse: Clara Humason

John Breckenridge Waldo (October 6, 1844 – September 2, 1907) was an American politician and jurist from the state of Oregon. A native of Oregon, he grew up near Salem as part of a prominent pioneer political family that included father Daniel and brother William. A trained lawyer, he was elected to the Oregon Supreme Court and served for one term from 1880 to 1886, including as the 13th Chief Justice from 1884 to 1886. He also served one term in the Oregon House of Representatives. Waldo spent many summers in the Cascade Range fostering an appreciation for the natural environment, which led to conservation efforts to preserve the range and later to the naming of several natural features after Waldo, notably Waldo Lake.

== Early life ==
Waldo was born in 1844 in Oregon to parents who immigrated to Oregon Country from Missouri via the Oregon Trail in 1843. The family settled near Salem in an area now known as the Waldo Hills in the Willamette Valley. John’s father Daniel Waldo, was also the father of William Waldo (1832–1911). Daniel Waldo was a politician in the early days of Oregon, while John’s brother William was a lawyer, judge, and state legislator, serving as President of the Oregon Senate in 1885.

John B. Waldo’s education was at Willamette University in Salem, graduating in 1866. He then passed the bar in 1870 and began practicing law in Salem. On October 8, 1877, he married Clara Humason of The Dalles, Oregon. They had one daughter named Edith.

== Political career ==
Waldo was elected to the Oregon Supreme Court in 1880 to a six-year term. He was not re-elected in 1886. During his time on the state's highest court, he served as chief justice from 1884 to 1886. John Waldo was also elected and served one term in the Oregon State House in 1888, representing Marion County.

== Conservation ==
Beginning in 1880, Waldo took annual horseback trips into the Cascade Mountains. Stops included Elk, Crescent, Odell, and Davis Lakes, climbing the Middle and South Sisters, Black Butte and many others before his death in 1907. His brother would often accompany him on these vacations, as would John Minto. In 1888, Waldo and four others traveled from Waldo Lake south to Mount Shasta along what is now the Pacific Crest Trail. This is believed to be the first recorded journey of this route.

These trips helped foster his appreciation for the natural world and spark a campaign for conservation of the Cascades. He was consulted by William Gladstone Steel when the later was attempting to get federal protection for Crater Lake. Waldo dreamed of a larger goal of preserving the entire Cascade range.

== Legacy ==
John B. Waldo died on September 2, 1907, at the age of 62. He was buried at the Salem Pioneer Cemetery where other family members such as his father, brother, and wife were also buried. Waldo Lake in the Cascades and Waldo Glacier on Mount Jefferson are named in his honor. Waldo Hall at Oregon State University was named for his wife Clara H. Waldo, and Waldo Park in Salem is named for his brother William, while Waldo Middle School in Salem is named for his father Daniel.

== See also ==
- Waldo Lake Wilderness
- Sky Lakes Wilderness
