= Governor Thayer =

Governor Thayer may refer to:

- John Milton Thayer (1820–1906), 2nd Governor of Wyoming Territory and 6th Governor of Nebraska
- W. W. Thayer (1827–1899), 6th Governor of Oregon
