= Frederick Waymire =

American politician

Member of the Oregon Constitutional Convention
- In office 1857
- Constituency: Polk County

Member of the Oregon Territorial Legislature
- In office 1850–1853, 1855–1856
- Constituency: Polk County

Oregon State Senator
- In office 1859–1860
- Constituency: Polk County

Member of the Oregon House of Representatives
- In office 1868–1869
- Constituency: Polk County

Personal details
- Born: March 15, 1807 Montgomery County, Ohio
- Died: April 28, 1873 (aged 66) Polk County, Oregon
- Party: Democratic
- Spouse: Frances (Fanny) Chance Cochrane

Frederick Waymire (March 15, 1807 – April 28, 1873) was an American farmer and politician in what became the state of Oregon. A native of Ohio, he served in the Oregon Territorial Legislature and was a member of the Oregon Constitutional Convention. He also helped start the La Creole Academy in Polk County and represented that county in the Oregon House of Representatives after Oregon became a state.

== Early life ==
Frederick Waymire was born on March 15, 1807, in Montgomery County in the southwestern portion of Ohio to Andrew and Easter Waymire. Trained as a millwright, he married Frances (Fanny) Chance Cochrane from Indiana in 1827, and the couple had 17 children. In 1845, Waymire and his family immigrated to the Oregon Country over the Oregon Trail and settled in what is now Polk County, Oregon.

== Oregon ==
The family farm was on a donation land claim located on the Luckiamute River, and Waymire called his house Hayden Hall. In 1846, Waymire was elected as the sheriff of what was then called Polk District, now Polk County. As early as 1853 he supported building railroads in the region, and thus was an early supporter of railroads in Oregon. This included being a commissioner of the Willamette Valley Railroad Company in 1854, though the company never built a line.

Waymire was also involved in local fraternal organizations. He was among the early members of Jennings Lodge No. 9, a Masonic lodge established in Dallas in 1854. On July 7, 1854, he was elected secretary of the lodge.

In 1855, Waymire constructed the first school building in the Little Luckiamute Valley. The building, later known as Waymire School, was located near the Little Luckiamute River, approximately two and a half miles below the falls. A school continued to operate at the site in subsequent years.

Waymire also participated in the establishment of the La Creole Academic Institute in Dallas. At an organizational meeting on February 5, 1855, he was elected as one of the institute's trustees. The institute was subsequently incorporated by the Oregon legislature on January 28, 1856.

== Political career ==
In 1850, Waymire was elected to the upper chamber Council of the Oregon Territorial Legislature and represented District 7 and Polk County during the 1850 to 1851 session. Elected as a Democrat, he served again during the 1851 to 1852 and the 1852 to 1853 sessions, both times still representing Polk County in the Council. After not serving for two sessions, Waymire returned to the legislature in the Oregon House in 1855 as the representative from District 24.

Waymire, part of the Democrats Salem Clique, was elected to represent Polk County at the Oregon Constitutional Convention in 1857. The convention drafted and ratified a proposed constitution to allow Oregon to become a state, which the citizens then approved later that year. During the convention, Waymire also participated in discussions concerning religious freedom and the relationship between religion and government. His remarks reflected the diversity of religious and nonreligious views among Oregon's population.. Waymire represented the farming contingent at the convention and was characterized as a "sort of Far West David Crockett" due in part to his lack of education. During the convention he fought against corporations, high salaries, and high taxes. His opposition to corporations came in part due to his lost investment on a telegraph line built to connect Portland to Corvallis that failed, with the investors left owing the creditors additional funds.

While waiting for approval of the Oregon Constitution from the United States Congress, Oregon's citizens elected officials for all public offices, and Waymire was elected to the Oregon State Senate in 1858. However, the U.S. Senate did not admit Oregon into the Union, and those legislators which included Waymire did not pass any laws and adjourned until news of statehood arrived. Oregon was admitted as a state on February 14, 1859, and Waymire and the rest of the legislature meet later that year. He served District 13 and Polk County as a Democrat at that first session of the Oregon State Legislature. Waymire returned to the legislature in 1868 as a member of the Oregon House from Polk County and District 34.

== Later years ==
Waymire, a Methodist, was one of the incorporators in 1856 of the La Creole Academy, an early secondary school. He served as one of the early trustees of the school located in Polk County at Dallas. Frederick Waymire died on April 28, 1873, at the age of 66 and was buried on his farm in Polk County. His wife Fanny died on October 15, 1878.

By : ShiroAkari
