= Paine Page Prim =

American judge

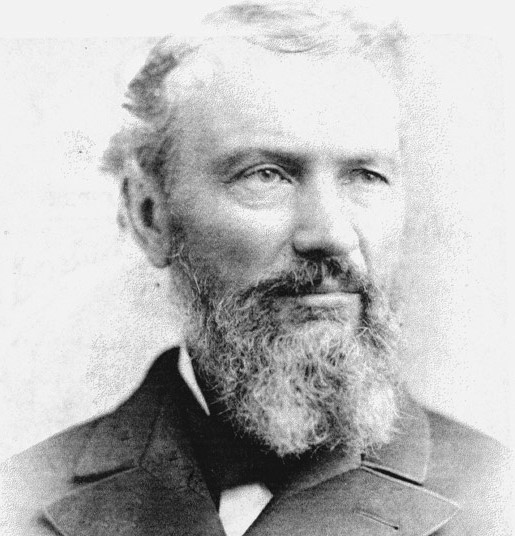

6th Chief Justice of the Oregon Supreme Court
- In office 1864-1866, 1870-1872 – 1876-1878
- Preceded by: Reuben P. Boise, Erasmus D. Shattuck, Benjamin F. Bonham
- Succeeded by: Erasmus D. Shattuck, William W. Upton, James K. Kelly

12th Justice of the Oregon Supreme Court
- In office 1859–1880
- Appointed by: John Whiteaker
- Preceded by: Matthew P. Deady
- Succeeded by: Edward B. Watson

Personal details
- Born: May 2, 1822 Wilson County, Tennessee
- Died: August 8, 1899 (aged 77) Oakland, California
- Party: Democratic
- Spouse: Teresa M. Stearns

Paine (Payne) Page Prim (May 2, 1822 – August 8, 1899) was an American attorney and judge in the state of Oregon. He was the 6th Chief Justice of the Oregon Supreme Court serving in that role three times between 1864 and 1878. Prim served on Oregon’s highest court for 21 years. Prim was the first graduate of Cumberland University's law school, and a participant at the Oregon Constitutional Convention.

== Early life ==
On May 2, 1822, Paine P. Prim was born in Wilson County, Tennessee. He grew up on his father’s farm before enrolling at Cumberland University in Lebanon, Tennessee. Prim received his legal education and was the school's first law graduate. Then in 1851 he traveled to Oregon via the Oregon Trail. There he settled in Linn County where he set up a law practice. Next, in 1857 he represented Jackson County at Oregon’s constitutional convention.

== Judicial career ==
In 1859, Prim was appointed to the Oregon Supreme Court by Governor John Whiteaker to fill the seat of Matthew P. Deady who had resigned. Then in 1860 he was elected to a full six-year term on the bench. Prim won re-election in 1866, and 1872. When his term ended in 1878, he was appointed on a temporary basis and served until 1880. While on the court he was chief justice three times: 1864 to 1866, 1870 to 1872, and 1876 to 1878.

== Later life ==
Prior to serving on the bench, Prim married Teresa M. Stearns in 1857. The couple produced three children. In 1880, after his term on the court ended, Prim returned to private practice in Jacksonville, Oregon. Then in 1882 he returned to politics when he was elected to the Oregon State Senate as a Democrat from Jackson County. He served again at the next session in 1885 in both the regular and special sessions that year. Paine Page Prim then died in Oakland, California, on August 8, 1899, at the age of 77 and is buried in Jacksonville, Oregon.

In 1961, the actor Arthur Franz was cast as Prim in the episode, "Justice at Jackson Creek", on the syndicated television anthology series, Death Valley Days, hosted by Stanley Andrews. Prim is shown as a drunken, ostracized lawyer who hesitates to help a miner in legal trouble but must overcome his personal demons. The episode also stars Dub Taylor as Jake; William Schallert as Carl Spenger, and Bill Bixby as Kinney.
