= Robert V. Short =

American politician

Robert Valentine Short
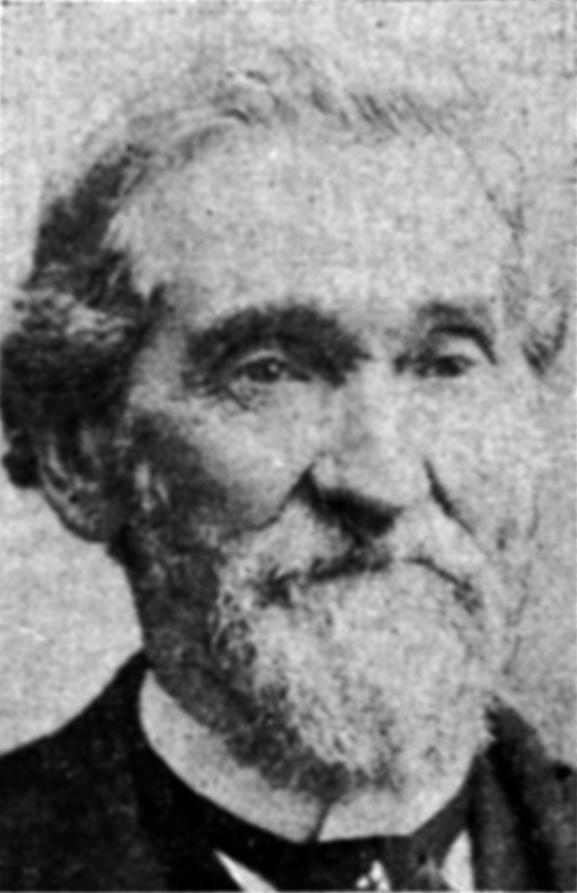
- Robert V. Short

Delegate to the Oregon Constitutional Convention
- In office 1857
- Constituency: Yamhill County

Member of the Oregon House of Representatives
- In office 1888–1890
- Constituency: Clackamas County

Personal details
- Born: March 31, 1823 Fairview, Pennsylvania
- Died: September 7, 1908 (aged 85) Portland, Oregon
- Party: Democrat
- Spouse: Mary Geer

Robert Valentine Short (March 31, 1823 – September 7, 1908) was an American politician and land surveyor in Oregon. A native of Pennsylvania, he traveled the Oregon Trail where he eventually settled in Yamhill County. He was a member of the Oregon Constitutional Convention and later the Oregon House of Representatives. Short also served in the Indian Wars and lived in Portland.

== Early life ==
Robert Short was born on March 31, 1823, to James and Eleanor (née McFarland) Short in Fairview, Pennsylvania. After apprenticing as a tailor he worked in Delaware and Gallion, Ohio before entering Ohio Wesleyan University in 1841. He left college the next year and was a school teacher from 1843 to 1844, before returning to tailoring in 1845 in Illinois. Short then worked as a farmhand in 1846 before heading west to the then Oregon Country in 1847 with Joel Palmer and Joseph C. Geer. Settling in Oregon City, he opened a tailoring shop before heading south to the gold mines of California from 1849 to 1850. He married Mary Geer on February 19, 1848, and they had six children.

== Oregon ==
In 1850, Short returned to what had become the Oregon Territory where he helped complete the first survey of the Portland townsite, and purchased a lot on what is now southwest Third Street between Alder and Washington. He built a house there, where the Dekum Building was later built. Short also surveyed Oregon City for John McLoughlin that year, as well as becoming the first surveyor for Yamhill County (1855) where he set up a donation land claim. During the Indian wars he served as a captain. In 1857, he served as a Democratic delegate to the Oregon Constitutional Convention for Yamhill County. At the convention he served on the Committee on Expenses.

The next year the Oregon Legislature passed a bill naming him as a surveyor and commissioner to relocated a portion of the road between Corvallis and Portland. After the American Civil War, he joined the Republican Party. From 1862 to 1864 he was the assessor for Clackamas County after part of what had been Yamhill County was changed to Clackamas County. In 1888, he was elected from District 6 to the Oregon House of Representatives representing Clackamas, serving a single two-year term.

== Later life and death ==
After leaving the legislature, he retired in 1891 to his home in Portland. Robert Short died on September 7, 1908, at the age of 85 in Portland. He was buried at Multnomah Park Cemetery in Portland. In 2014, a Douglas fir tree on his former property in Wilsonville was designated as an Oregon Heritage Tree.
