= John C. Carson =

Businessman and legislator from Oregon (1825–1911)

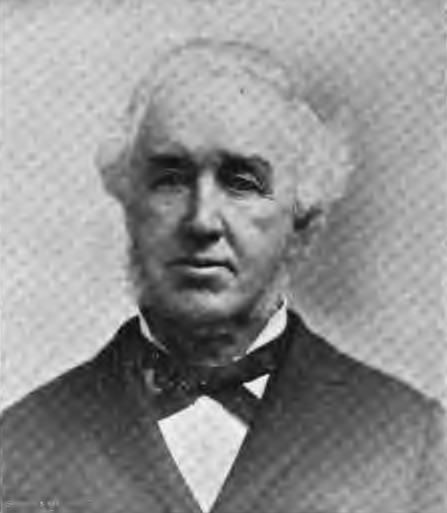
- Oregon Senate President John Carson

12th President of the Oregon State Senate
- In office 1887–1888
- Preceded by: William Waldo
- Succeeded by: Joseph Simon

Member of the Oregon Senate from the 22nd (1885‍–‍1888), 18th (1889‍–‍1892) district
- In office 1885–1892
- Constituency: Multnomah

Member of the Oregon House of Representatives from the 40th district
- In office 1870–1871, 1882–1884

Personal details
- Born: February 20, 1825 Centre County, Pennsylvania, U.S.
- Died: May 31, 1911 (aged 86) Portland, Oregon, U.S.
- Party: Republican
- Spouses: Elizabeth Talbot (m. 1854; died 1860); Eliza Ann Northop (m. 1861; died 1901)
- Profession: Wood products manufacturer and building contractor

John Crosthwaite Carson (February 20, 1825 – May 31, 1911) was an American wood products manufacturer, building contractor, and politician from Portland, Oregon. He was a life-long Republican who represented Multnomah County in the Oregon legislature. Carson served two non-consecutive two-year terms in the Oregon House of Representatives followed by two four-year terms in the Oregon State Senate. He was President of the Oregon State Senate during the 1887 legislative session.

== Early life ==
Carson was born on February 20, 1825, in Centre County, Pennsylvania. He was the son of James Carson and Sarah (Crosthwaite) Carson. In 1834, his parents moved their family to Ashland County, Ohio. Carson was educated in local public schools before entering Ashland Academy in 1846. While at the academy, he paid his tuition by working as a carpenter. After three years of general study, Carson was accepted into the academy's medical training program, under the supervision of J. W. Kinneman. His medical science training qualified him to practice medicine; however, he never received a medical diploma.

In 1850, Carson traveled to California with Kinneman. The two medical professionals planned to open a hospital in San Francisco. On the steamship journey to California, Carson became ill. Shortly after arriving on the west coast, Kinneman also fell ill and decided to return home. After Carson recovered, he began mining on the Middle Fork of the American River and then continued mining in the Redding area before establishing a hotel and trading post in the Trinity Mountains. His establishment was known as the Mountain House and was popular with miners. After managing the hostel for six months, he fell ill again and sold his interest in the business.

== Oregon businessman ==
Carson set sail for Portland in 1851. When he arrived, he found work as a hardware store manager. A few months later, he was hired as a schoolteacher in a small community near Portland. The school had sixteen students. However, Carson quit the position when local residents refused to purchase books for the students. He then returned to Portland where he worked as a carpenter. A year later, he was engaged as a building contractor. His first building was the Dekum & Bickel store on Front Street in Portland.

In 1854, Carson married Elizabeth Talbot, who had arrived in Oregon three years earlier. She died in 1860. A year later, Carson married Eliza Ann Northrop. They remained married until her death in 1901. Between his two marriages, Carson had five children, plus one stepson.

In 1857, Carson began milling lumber for his construction projects. The new business was undertaken with his brother, David, using the name J. C. and D. R. Carson. Their mill was the first steam operated planing operation north of San Francisco. The business grew rapidly, expanding its market throughout the Pacific Northwest. To meet the demand for finished wood products, the brothers purchased new machinery that increased the company's production capacity. In 1872, the partnership was dissolved by mutual consent and Carson took charge of the business. By that time, the mill was very efficient and productive, yet its capacity never equaled the demand for lumber and specialty wood products so in 1873 he built a second mill.

Carson was also active in civil affairs. He served on the Portland city council for six years, beginning in 1854. This included one term as council president. Much of the city's modern infrastructure was built during his tenure on the city council. This included construction of the city's first sidewalk. In addition, he was a regular delegate to town, county, and state Republican conventions. He was also a strong advocate for the establishment of a public school system. In 1868, Carson, Jesse Applegate, and Jacob Rynearson were appointed by the United States Treasury Department to a special commission to inspect and evaluate property previously occupied by Hudson's Bay Company for which the company claimed compensation from the United States Government. The commission's recommendations regarding compensation were accepted by all parties.

In 1879, Carson and four partners formed a real estate and building association to help finance home construction in the Portland area. The business was capitalized with $100,000 raised through the sale of 10,000 shares. In 1881, he joined two partners to incorporate a gold mining company. Later, Carson and several partners incorporated the Columbia and Nehalem Railroad to build and operate rail service and a telegraph line along the Columbia River.

== State legislator ==
In 1870, Carson entered state politics, winning a seat in the Oregon House of Representatives as a Republican representing Multnomah County. The 1870 legislative session began on September 12 and lasted through October 20. After the session ended, Carson returned to his business interests in Portland. He held the seat for one term which ended in 1871, but did not seek re-election.

Carson returned to state politics in 1882 as a candidate for state representative. He won Multnomah County's District 40 seat, once again as a Republican. The session began on September 11 and continued through October 19. Normally, he would have held the seat for two years; however, the legislature shifted its sessions from the summer of even-numbered years to the winter of odd-numbered years, so members elected in 1882 served for an extra half-year pending the start of the 1885 session.

In 1885, Carson run for a seat in the Oregon State Senate. Carson and fellow Republican Joseph Simon won Multnomah County's two open senate seats. The 1885 session began on January 12 with Carson representing District 22. The session ended on February 21. Carson returned to the capitol for a special legislative session later that year. The special session was called to order on November 11 and was adjourned on November 24. While the legislature was out of session, he remained active in politics, representing Multnomah County at the state's 1886 Republican convention.

Since senate terms are four years, Carson did not have to run for re-election prior to the 1887 session. The 1887 legislative session began on January 10. As the senate was organizing and electing officers, Carson was nominated for senate president. He was easily elected to the post by fellow senators, receiving 19 votes, while the Democratic candidate, J. K. Weatherford of Linn County, received only 10 votes. During his tenure as senate president, Carson was known for his fair and collegial leadership. Carson led the senate through the session which ended on February 18.

In 1888, the Multnomah County Republican convention nominated Carson for re-election to the state senate along with Joseph Simon, Donald McKay, and J. K. Waite. All four Republican candidates won senate seats in the 1889 session. While newspapers mentioned Carson as a possible candidate for senate president, it was his Multnomah County colleague, Joseph Simon, who won the president position in the 1889 session. The session opened on January 14. The session ended on February 22. In the interim after the session ended, Carson was appointed to the Multnomah County Republican Central Committee.

Once again in 1890, Carson was a holdover senator in the middle of his four-year term, so he did not have to run for re-election prior to the 1891 legislative session. The session began on January 9. It was reported in newspapers that Carson was the oldest member of the state senate. The session was adjourned on February 17.

== Later life ==
Carson did not run for re-election in 1892. Instead, he returned to Portland to focus attention on his wood products business. By that time, his company was one of the largest producers of doors and window frames on the west coast. His company also sold finished lumber, paint, glass, and other building materials. In 1894, Carson turned the day-to-day management of his business over to the Holiday Company, which had been successfully marketing his lumber, doors, window frames, and wood products for some time. At that point, Carson retired from day-to-day engagement in the business.

However, Carson's accumulated wealth allowed him to remain an active investor in development projects in Portland and the surrounding region. For example, in 1902 he became a founding partner in the Portland and Alaska Transportation Company, a steamship shipping business based in Portland. He also continued his involvement in Republican political. In 1895, Oregon Republicans selected him as a delegate to the national Republican convention in Cleveland, Ohio. As late as 1905, he was still serving as a delegate to state Republican conventions.

Carson had joined the local Masons lodge in 1860. Later, he become a member of several other related organizations including the local Royal Arch Masonry chapter and the Scottish Rite. He remained an active member of these fraternal groups throughout his life.

Carson died on May 31, 1911, at his home in Portland, Oregon, at the age of 86. A private funeral service was held at his home on June 2, followed by an open service at his grave at Greenwood Cemetery. The funeral rites were under the auspices of his Masonic lodge. Honorary pallbearers included former governor Zenas F. Moody, former United States Senator Joseph Simon, newspaper publisher Henry Pittock, and Portland attorney and businessman Cyrus A. Dolph.
