= Conrad P. Olson =

American judge

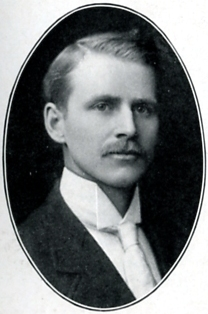

48th Justice of the Oregon Supreme Court
- In office 1918–1919
- Appointed by: James Withycombe
- Preceded by: Frank A. Moore
- Succeeded by: Alfred S. Bennett

Member of the Oregon House of Representatives
- In office 1913–1917

Personal details
- Born: September 4, 1882 Clay Banks, Wisconsin
- Died: March 1, 1952 (aged 69) Sturgeon Bay, Wisconsin
- Spouse: Nellie C. Frost

Conrad Patrick Olson (September 4, 1882 – March 1, 1952) was an American politician and judge in Oregon. He was the 48th justice of the Oregon Supreme Court. Additionally, the Wisconsin native served in both chambers of the Oregon Legislature during the early 1900s.

== Early life ==
Conrad Olson was born in the town of Clay Banks in Door County, Wisconsin on September 4, 1882. In Wisconsin he was educated first at the Stevens Point Normal School, and later at the University of Wisconsin–Madison. After receiving his education he became a civil service examiner and a school teacher before moving to Oregon in 1908. In Oregon he settled in Portland where in 1910 he married Nellie C. Frost, and they had two children together.

== Political career ==
In 1912 Olson was elected to the Oregon House of Representatives as a Republican representing Multnomah County as a Republican. He returned to the House the following legislative session in 1915, but moved to the Oregon State Senate for the 1917 session. While serving in the legislature he was responsible for introducing legislation to create state funded kindergartens as well as a bills relating to the illegitimate children of men who then deserted their family to allow for better treatment of these children. Olson also was the first person of Swedish ancestry to manage the campaign of an Oregon governor. Then on September 27, 1918, Olson was appointed to the Oregon Supreme Court to replace Frank A. Moore by Oregon Governor James Withycombe after Moore had died in office. This term the ended on January 7, 1919 and Olson left the bench as Alfred S. Bennett had won the fall election.

== Later life ==
After leaving the court Olson then served as Oregon's code commissioner from 1919 to 1921, where he was charged with standardizing the state's laws. The work produced from this was a two volume Oregon Laws, published in 1920 After this he began private practice in Portland before dying in Sturgeon Bay, Wisconsin on March 1, 1952.
