= James F. Watson =

American judge

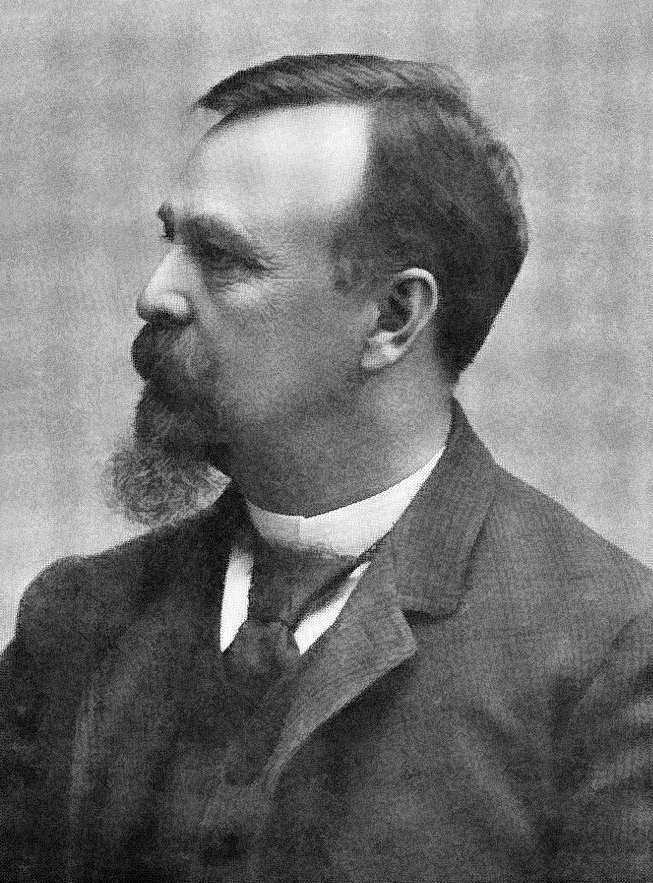

25th Justice of the Oregon Supreme Court
- In office 1876–1878
- Preceded by: John Burnett
- Succeeded by: James K. Kelly

Member of the Oregon Senate
- In office 1873–1877

Personal details
- Born: March 15, 1840 Dubuque, Iowa
- Died: June 12, 1897 (aged 57)
- Party: Republican
- Spouse(s): Isabella Flint, Virginia Kinney

James Finley Watson (March 15, 1840 – June 12, 1897) was an American judge and politician in Oregon. A native of Iowa, he was the 25th associate justice of the Oregon Supreme Court serving from 1876 until 1878. Previously he served in the state legislature and later served as United States Attorney for the District of Oregon.

== Early life ==
James Finley Watson was born on March 15, 1840, in Dubuque, Iowa, to James and Emily Watson. In 1853, the family relocated to Douglas County in Oregon Territory. Watson then was educated in Eugene, Oregon at Columbia College before it closed after two major fires. After attempting gold mining he would learn the law under Rufus Mallory in Roseburg, Oregon, with admittance to the legal bar in 1863. He then served as a prosecutor for Oregon’s Second Judicial District from 1864 to 1872.

== Political career ==
In 1872, Watson was elected to the Oregon State Senate as a Republican from Douglas County. He won re-election in 1874 to the same seat in the senate. Next, in 1876 Watson won election to the Oregon Supreme Court to replace John Burnett. His term ended in 1878 and he left the bench, however, his younger brother Edward B. Watson would join the court in 1880.

In 1878, the circuit court functions of the Oregon Supreme Court were split off and a separate circuit court was created with the number of judges on the high court reduced from five to three. The following year Watson was appointed to the circuit court where he won re-election in 1880 and served until 1882.

== Later life ==
In 1882, Watson was appointed by the United States President to the position of U.S. District Attorney for the District of Oregon. He kept that position until 1886 when he returned to private practice in Portland, Oregon. In 1883, he married his second wife, Virginia Kinney. He was previously married to Isabella Flint in 1872, and they had two children. James Finley Watson died on June 12, 1897.
