= Robert S. Bean =

American judge

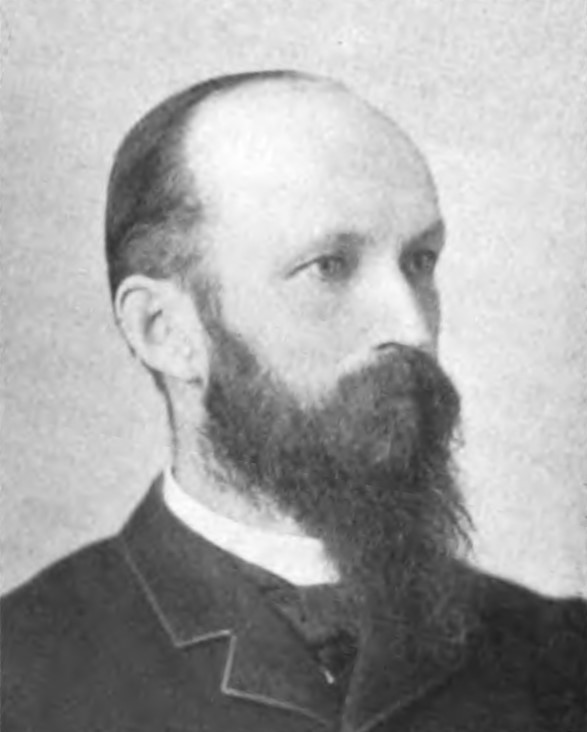

Judge of the United States District Court for the District of Oregon
- In office April 28, 1909 – January 7, 1931
- Appointed by: William Howard Taft
- Preceded by: Seat established by 35 Stat. 686
- Succeeded by: James Alger Fee

16th Chief Justice of the Oregon Supreme Court
- In office 1905–1909
- Preceded by: Frank A. Moore
- Succeeded by: Frank A. Moore
- In office 1900–1902
- Preceded by: Charles E. Wolverton
- Succeeded by: Frank A. Moore
- In office 1894–1896
- Preceded by: William Paine Lord
- Succeeded by: Frank A. Moore

32nd Justice of the Oregon Supreme Court
- In office 1890–1909
- Preceded by: W. W. Thayer
- Succeeded by: Thomas A. McBride

Personal details
- Born: Robert Sharp Bean; November 28, 1854 Yamhill County, Oregon Territory
- Died: January 7, 1931 (aged 76) Portland, Oregon
- Resting place: River View Cemetery; Portland, Oregon
- Education: Western Oregon University; University of Oregon (B.S.) read law

Robert Sharp Bean (November 28, 1854 – January 7, 1931) was the 16th Chief Justice of the Oregon Supreme Court, serving as Chief Justice three different times. He later served as a United States district judge of the United States District Court for the District of Oregon. An Oregon native, he was part of the first graduating class of the University of Oregon.

== Education and career ==
Born on November 28, 1854, in Yamhill County, Oregon Territory (State of Oregon from February 14, 1859), Bean graduated from Christian College (now Western Oregon University) in 1873 and read law in 1878. He received a Bachelor of Science degree in 1878 from the University of Oregon and was a member of the first graduating class of that institution. He entered private practice in Eugene, Oregon from 1878 to 1882. He was a Judge of the Oregon Circuit Court for the Second Judicial District from 1882 to 1890. He was elected as a justice of the Supreme Court of Oregon in 1890 and reelected to additional six-year terms in 1896, 1902 and 1908, serving from 1890 to 1909, and serving as chief justice from 1894 to 1896, from 1900 to 1902, and from 1905 to 1908. On May 1, 1909, he resigned from the Supreme Court to take a federal judicial post. Additionally, Bean served as a regent at the University of Oregon in 1882 to 1895, and again from 1898 to 1921. Bean was a director of the Oregon Historical Society in 1926.

=== Notable cases as Justice ===
While Chief Justice in 1906, Justice Bean wrote the opinion for the Oregon court in State v. Muller (48 Or. 252, 85 P. 855) that would then go to the United States Supreme Court, where the opinion was affirmed. He also wrote the opinion in Kadderly v. City of Portland, 44 Or 118, 74 P. 710 (1903) on the constitutionality of the initiative and referendum system in Oregon.

== Federal judicial service ==
Bean was nominated by President William Howard Taft on April 15, 1909, to the United States District Court for the District of Oregon, to a new seat authorized by 35 Stat. 686. George W. Joseph, a prominent Portland lawyer and politician who would later be nominated for governor of Oregon, opposed Bean's appointment on the grounds that his services were too valuable as a Supreme Court justice, and that the people of Oregon couldn't "spare" him. Bean was confirmed by the United States Senate on April 28, 1909, and received his commission the same day. His service terminated on January 7, 1931, due to his death in Portland, Oregon. Bean was interred at River View Cemetery in Portland.

== Honor ==
In 1895, the University of Oregon conferred an honorary doctorate of laws degree on the Bean. Justice Bean Hall, a dormitory at the school, was named in his honor and opened in 1963.

== Family ==
Bean's parent's, Obadiah Roberts Bean and Julia Sharp Bean, immigrated to Oregon in 1851 and settled in Mapleton. In 1880 Robert married Ina E. Condon, daughter of geologist Thomas Condon, and the two had five sons.

== See also ==
- List of Liberty ships (M–R)

Legal offices
Preceded by Seat established by 35 Stat. 686	Judge of the United States District Court for the District of Oregon; 1909–1931	Succeeded by James Alger Fee
