= William W. Upton =

American judge

8th Chief Justice of the Oregon Supreme Court
- In office 1872–1874
- Preceded by: Paine Page Prim
- Succeeded by: Benjamin F. Bonham

17th Justice of the Oregon Supreme Court
- In office 1867–1874
- Appointed by: George L. Woods
- Preceded by: Erasmus D. Shattuck
- Succeeded by: Erasmus D. Shattuck

Personal details
- Born: July 11, 1817 Victor, New York
- Died: January 23, 1896 (aged 78) Washington, DC

William W. Upton (July 11, 1817 – January 23, 1896) was an American jurist and politician. He served as Oregon’s 8th Chief Justice of the state’s highest court. William Upton served from 1867 until 1874 on the Oregon Supreme Court before appointment to a position with the United States Treasury in 1877. A native of New York, he was elected to the state legislatures in Michigan, California, and Oregon.

== Early life ==
Upton was born on July 11, 1817, in Victor, New York. There he attended Lima Academy. Later he moved to Michigan, where in 1840 he was admitted to that state’s bar. He also served in the Michigan State Legislature. Then in 1852 he moved to California. In California he was elected to the state legislature in 1856. Then in 1861 he was the district attorney for Sacramento County, California.

== Oregon ==
In 1865 William Upton immigrated north to Oregon. The following year he served in the Oregon House of Representatives as a Republican from Multnomah County. Then in December 1867, Upton was appointed to the Oregon Supreme Court by Oregon Governor George L. Woods to replace Erasmus D. Shattuck who had resigned. The next year Upton won a full six-year term that ended in 1874. While on the bench he was chief justice from 1872 until 1874. He also wrote a 17-page dissent in the legislative delegation case of Brown v. Fleischner, 4 Or 132, (1871), which would be overturned using Upton’s argument in Shattuck v. Kincaid, 31 Or. 379 (1897). Former justice Shattuck would then replace Upton on the court.

== Later life ==
Upon leaving the court, Upton was appointed to a position in the United States Treasury. President Rutherford B. Hayes made Upton the second comptroller of the Treasury in 1877. He kept that position until 1885 and then died on January 23, 1896, in Washington, D.C.
