= William Waldo (Oregon politician) =

American politician

President of the Oregon State Senate
- In office 1885–1885
- Preceded by: W. J. McConnell
- Succeeded by: John C. Carson

Member of the Oregon State Senate
- In office 1878–1885
- Constituency: Marion County

Personal details
- Born: April 22, 1832 Gasconade County, Missouri
- Died: November 24, 1911 (aged 79) Oregon
- Party: Republican

William Waldo (April 22, 1832 – November 24, 1911) was an American politician and attorney in Oregon. Born in Missouri, he came to the Oregon Country with his family that included father Daniel Waldo. He would serve in the Oregon State Senate, including as president of the body in 1885. Waldo was also a county judge, while his brother John B. Waldo would serve on the Oregon Supreme Court.

== Early life ==
William Waldo was born in Gasconade County, Missouri, on April 22, 1832, to Daniel and Malinda Lunsford Waldo. In 1843, the family traveled the Oregon Trail to Oregon Country along with neighbors Jesse and Lindsay Applegate. William joined the militia during the Cayuse War, serving for the Provisional Government of Oregon in the war against those responsible for the Whitman Massacre.

In 1849, he headed south to California for the gold mines. There he worked at Yreka before returning to Missouri in 1852. Waldo purchased and drove 300 head of cattle to Oregon in 1853 to the family's farm in the Waldo Hills. For a few years he traveled back and forth from his birth state to what was the Oregon Territory, even attending the University of Missouri at one time.

== Oregon ==
After returning to Oregon permanently, William Waldo attended Willamette University in Salem. He then read law from future Oregon governor and Senator La Fayette Grover, passing the bar in 1863. After practicing law for a period he entered politics.

In 1878, he joined the Oregon State Senate, representing Marion County as a Republican. He continued to serve in the 1880 and 1882 sessions of the Oregon Legislative Assembly, with no session held in 1884. During the 1885 regular and special sessions of the legislature Waldo served as the President of the Senate.

== Later life and legacy ==
He would serve as a county judge for Marion County from July 1890 to June 1891, at that time the position was part of the Marion County Commissioners Court. William would spend summers in the Cascade Mountains exploring with his younger brother John B. Waldo and fellow politician John Minto. His farm is now within the city of Salem. William Waldo died on November 24, 1911, at the age of 79. Waldo Park in Salem is named in his honor.
