= Stephen F. Chadwick =

5th Governor of Oregon

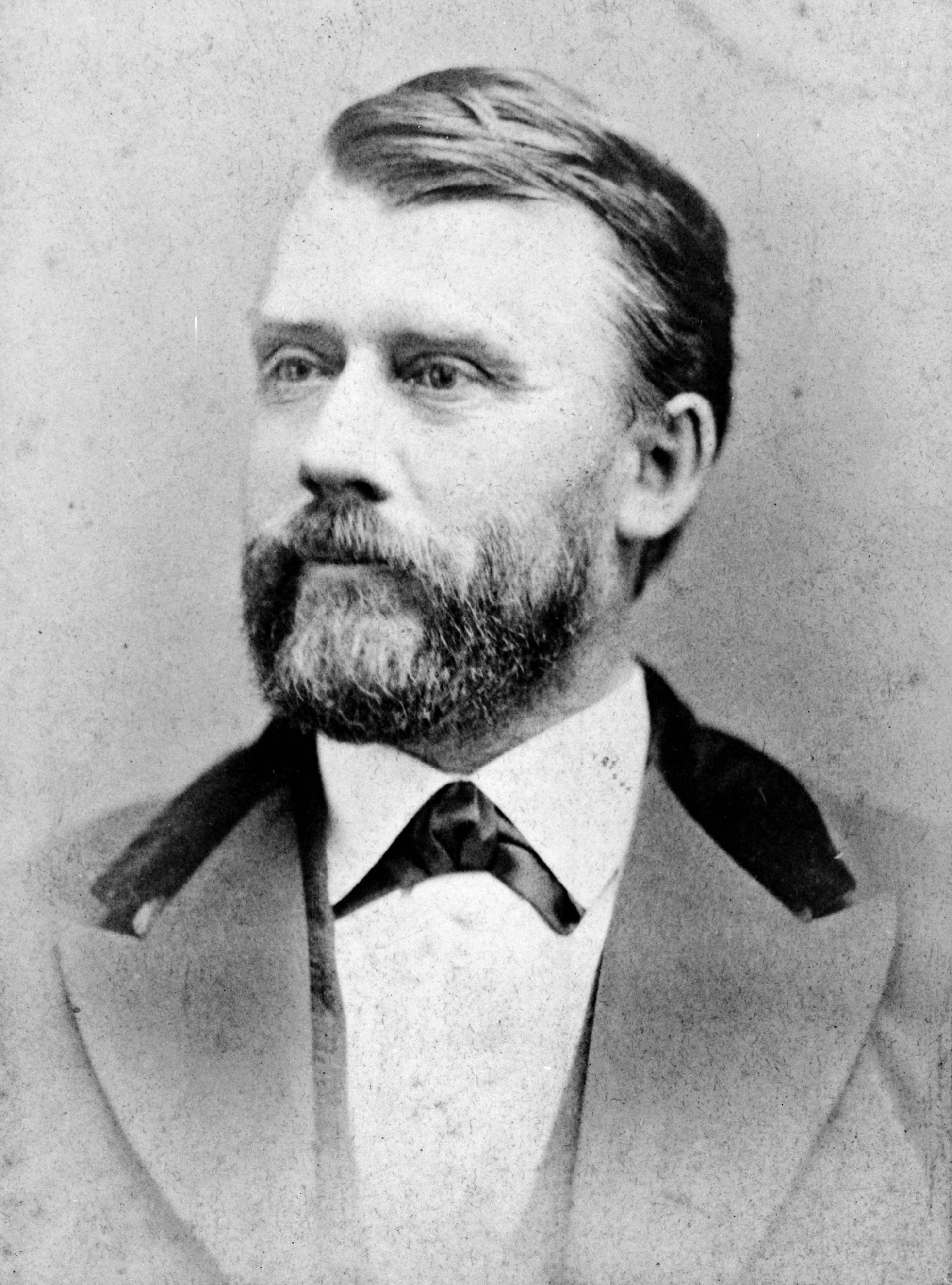
- Chadwick in the 1870s

5th Governor of Oregon
- In office February 1, 1877 – September 11, 1878
- Preceded by: La Fayette Grover
- Succeeded by: W. W. Thayer

Secretary of State of Oregon
- In office September 10, 1870 – September 2, 1878
- Governor: George L. Woods; La Fayette Grover
- Preceded by: Samuel E. May
- Succeeded by: Rockey Preston Earhart

Personal details
- Born: Stephen Fowler Chadwick; December 25, 1825 Middletown, Connecticut, U.S.
- Died: January 15, 1895 (aged 69) Salem, Oregon, U.S.
- Party: Democratic
- Spouse: Jane A. Smith
- Profession: Lawyer

Stephen Fowler Chadwick (December 25, 1825 – January 15, 1895) was an American Democratic politician who served as the fifth governor of Oregon from 1877 to 1878. Chadwick was the first person to obtain the governorship by way of the state's line of succession.

== Biography ==
=== Occupational background ===
Chadwick was a lawyer, admitted to the New York State Bar on May 30, 1850. He soon made his way to Oregon, setting up a law firm in Douglas County in the settlement of Scottsburg on April 21, 1851. Chadwick served as the town's first postmaster.

=== Early political career ===
After moving from Scottsburg to Roseburg, Chadwick ran for the newly created position of Judge of Douglas County. Later, he represented Douglas County at the State Constitutional Convention, in 1857. In the 1864 and 1868 Presidential elections, Chadwick served as a Democratic elector.

Chadwick won the 1870 election to the position of Secretary of State, and was subsequently reelected in 1874.

Chadwick is credited for having originated the idea while Secretary of State to make June 15 an Oregon state holiday called "Pioneer Day." The date of the occasion was selected in honor of the signing of the 1846 treaty between the United States and Great Britain formally settling their contested claims to the Oregon Territory.

=== Governorship ===
In 1877 La Fayette Grover resigned the governorship after his election to the United States Senate by the State Legislature. Chadwick, as Secretary of State and second in the gubernatorial line of succession, was inaugurated to fill out the remaining year of Grover's gubernatorial term.

Although unconstitutional under Article V, Section 1 of the State Constitution, Chadwick also kept his position of Secretary of State. When signing official documents requiring the signatures of both the Secretary of State and Governor, he would sign first on the left side, then on the right.

The most notable policy of his administration was Chadwick's stand on the Nez Perce War raging in the northeastern part of the state. Chadwick was unhappy with the stalemated situation, going so far as to inspect the front lines first-hand. He aided white settlers during the conflict, and argued for much harsher punishments for rebellious and uncooperative tribal leaders than the Army's policies.

At the time of the 1878 elections, Chadwick declined a second term and went back to practicing law.

=== Death and legacy ===
Stephen F. Chadwick died on February 15, 1895, in Salem, Oregon. Chadwick's son, Stephen J. Chadwick, would later serve on the Washington Supreme Court.

== Footnotes ==
Political offices
Preceded by Samuel E. May	Secretary of State of Oregon; 1870–1878	Succeeded by Rockey Preston Earhart
Preceded by La Fayette Grover	Governor of Oregon; 1877–1878	Succeeded by W. W. Thayer
