= Waldo Lake =

Lake in Oregon, United States

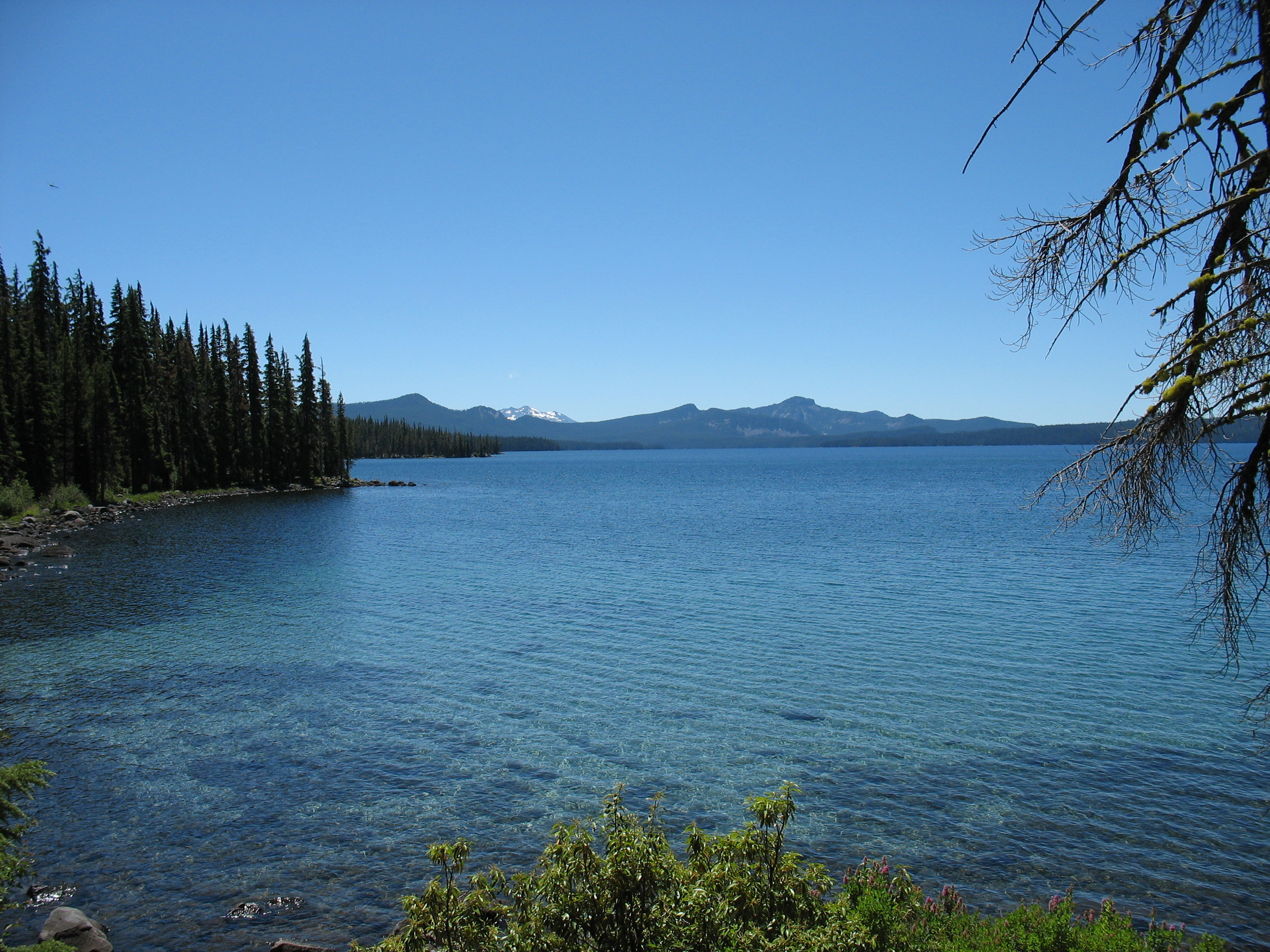

- Location within Oregon Location within the United States
- Location: Cascade Mountains, Lane County, Oregon, US
- Coordinates: 43.729918°N 122.0423006°W
- Type: Alpine
- Primary outflows: North Fork Middle Fork Willamette River
- Basin countries: United States
- Max. length: 5.75 mi (9.25 km)
- Max. width: 2.75 mi (4.43 km)
- Surface area: > 10 sq mi (26 km^{2})
- Average depth: mean: 128 ft (39 m)
- Max. depth: 420 ft (130 m)
- Water volume: 0.9537 km^{3} (0.2288 cu mi)
- Residence time: 32 years
- Surface elevation: 5,420 ft (1,650 m)

Waldo Lake is a natural subalpine lake in the Cascade Mountains of the U.S. state of Oregon. It is the second largest natural non-alkali lake in Oregon with just under 10 square miles (26 km^{2}) of water surface and a maximum depth of 420 feet (130 m). The lake is named after Oregon politician, judge, and conservationist John B. Waldo.

== Location ==
The lake is located in Lane County at an elevation of 5,414 feet (1,650 m) above sea level. Access is via Forest Service Road 5897 from Oregon Route 58 approximately 18 miles (29 km) east of Oakridge. The forest road travels 12 miles (19 km) to the lake.

== History ==
The area was first inhabited by Native Americans, and the lake was later discovered by Molalla Indian Charlie Tufti. According to pioneer resident Frank S. Warner it was then named Pengra Lake after Byron J. Pengra, a pioneer railroad champion. Later the lake was named in honor of Judge John B. Waldo from the Oregon Supreme Court who helped push for preservation in the Cascades which began with the Cascade Forest Reserve established by President Cleveland in 1893. Waldo was the son of Daniel Waldo for whom the Waldo Hills are named.

The area was also used by sheep farmers for grazing prior to the establishment of recreation facilities by the Civilian Conservation Corps during the Great Depression in 1939. Later facilities were built by the Forest Service in 1971.

In 1979 the lake received around 10,000 visitor days per year, and by 1989 that number increased to 32,000 per year. Between those years, in 1984, 37,000 acres (15,000 ha) to the north, west, and south were designated as the Waldo Lake Wilderness by the federal government. In 1996, a forest fire, the Charlton fire, swept by the lake and forced the evacuation of several campgrounds while burning much of the north side of the lake's surrounding forest.

=== Reservoir plans ===
Starting in 1905, plans were begun to use the lake as a reservoir for irrigation in the Willamette Valley. To this end, the Waldo Lake Irrigation and Power Company was created in 1908 by several people including F.H. Ray. In 1909 a permit was issued by the Forest Service to build a tunnel from the lake to a nearby creek. Construction of the tunnel began that year and finished in 1914 under the direction of engineer Simon Klovdahl. The 500-foot (150 m) tunnel was able to lower the lake level by 25 feet (7.6 m). However, the company was never able to prosper and the head gates on the southwest shore were sealed in 1960.

== Details ==
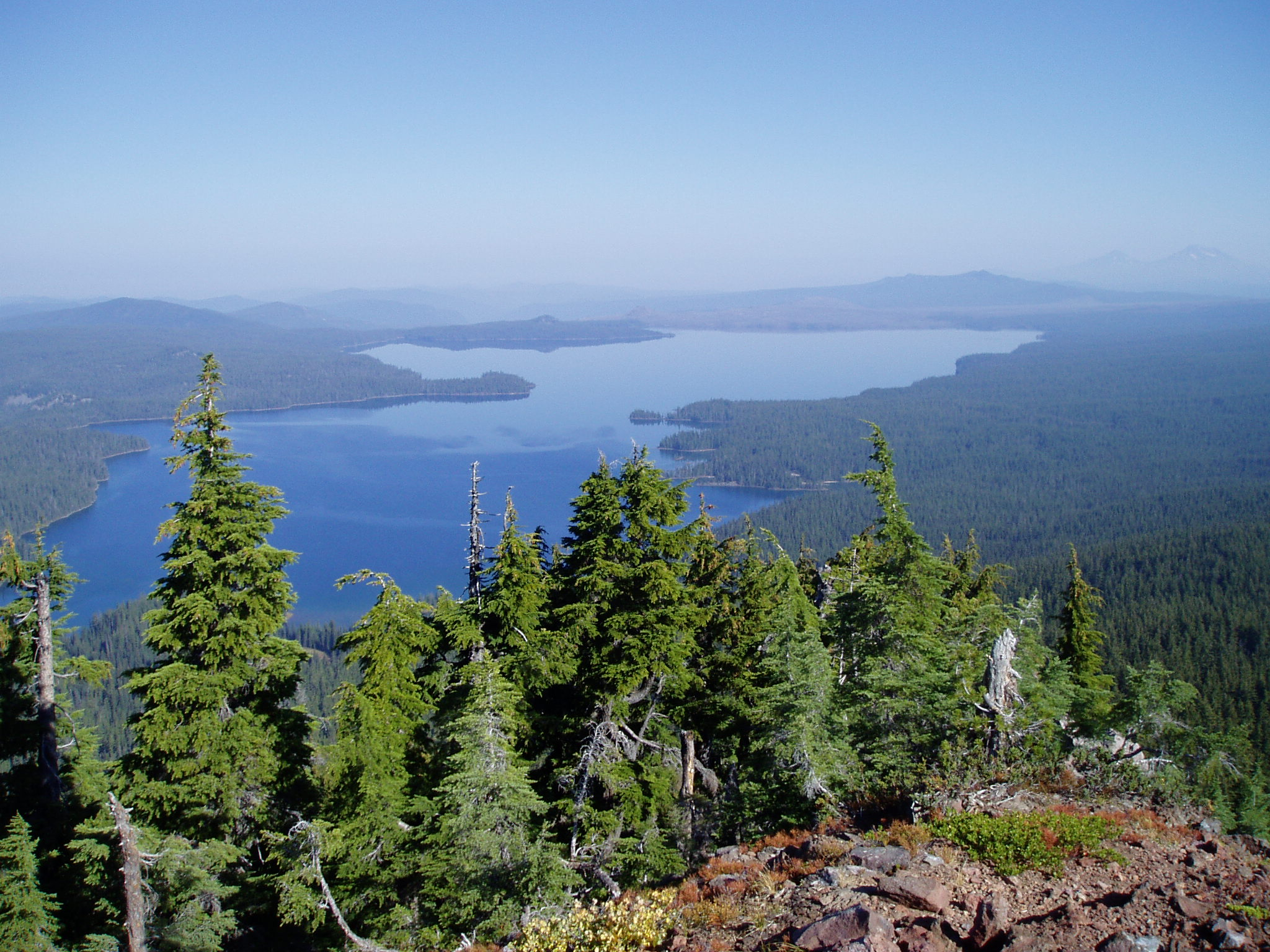
Looking down on the lake from the south

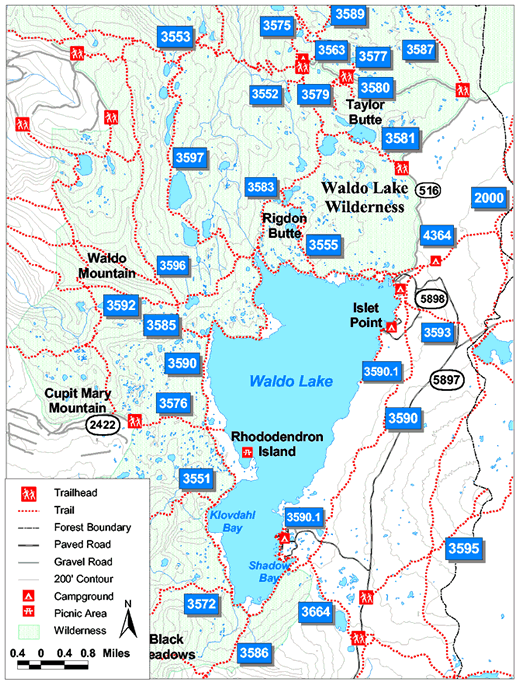
Map of the lake and surrounding area

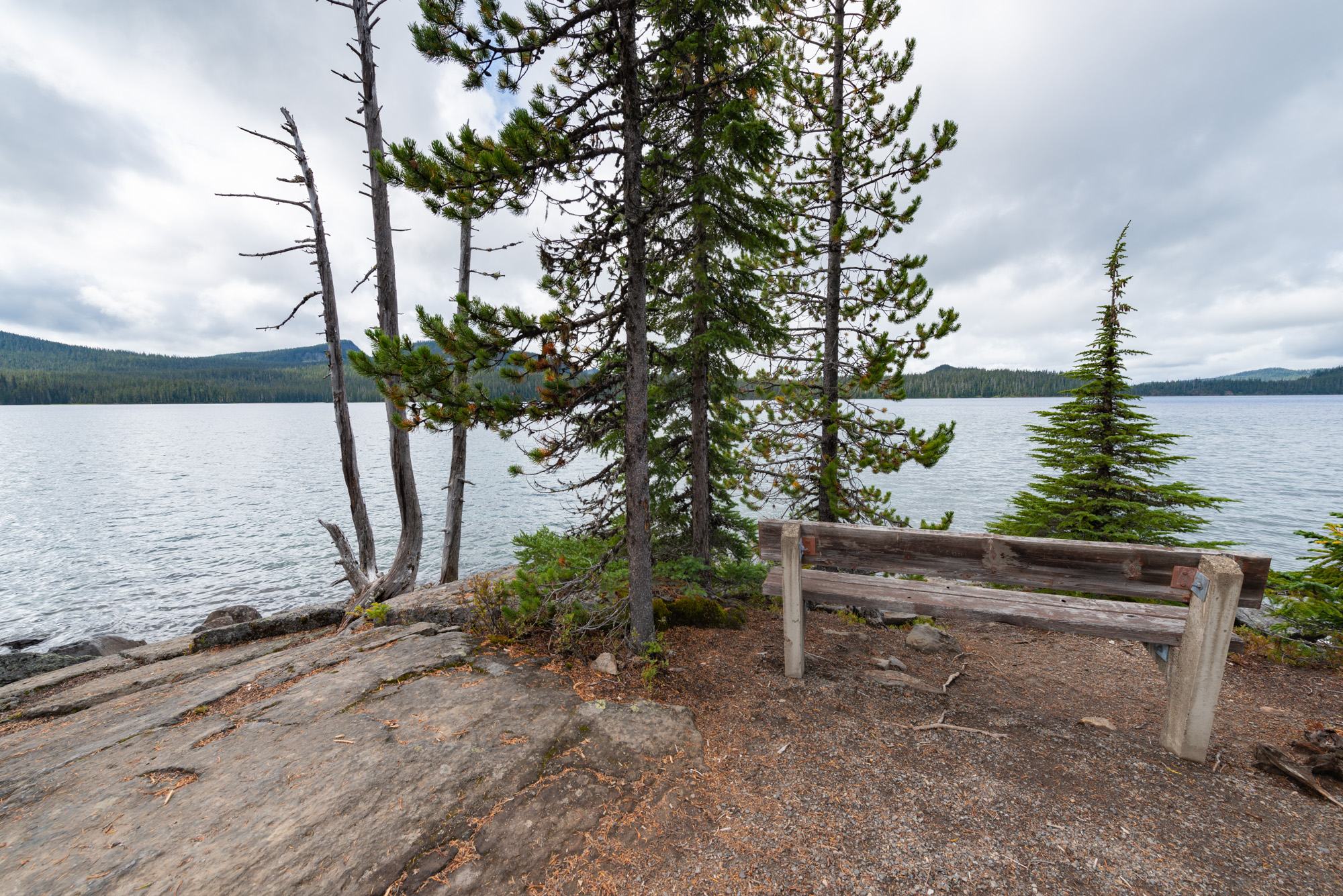
Waldo Lake from Shadow Bay Campground

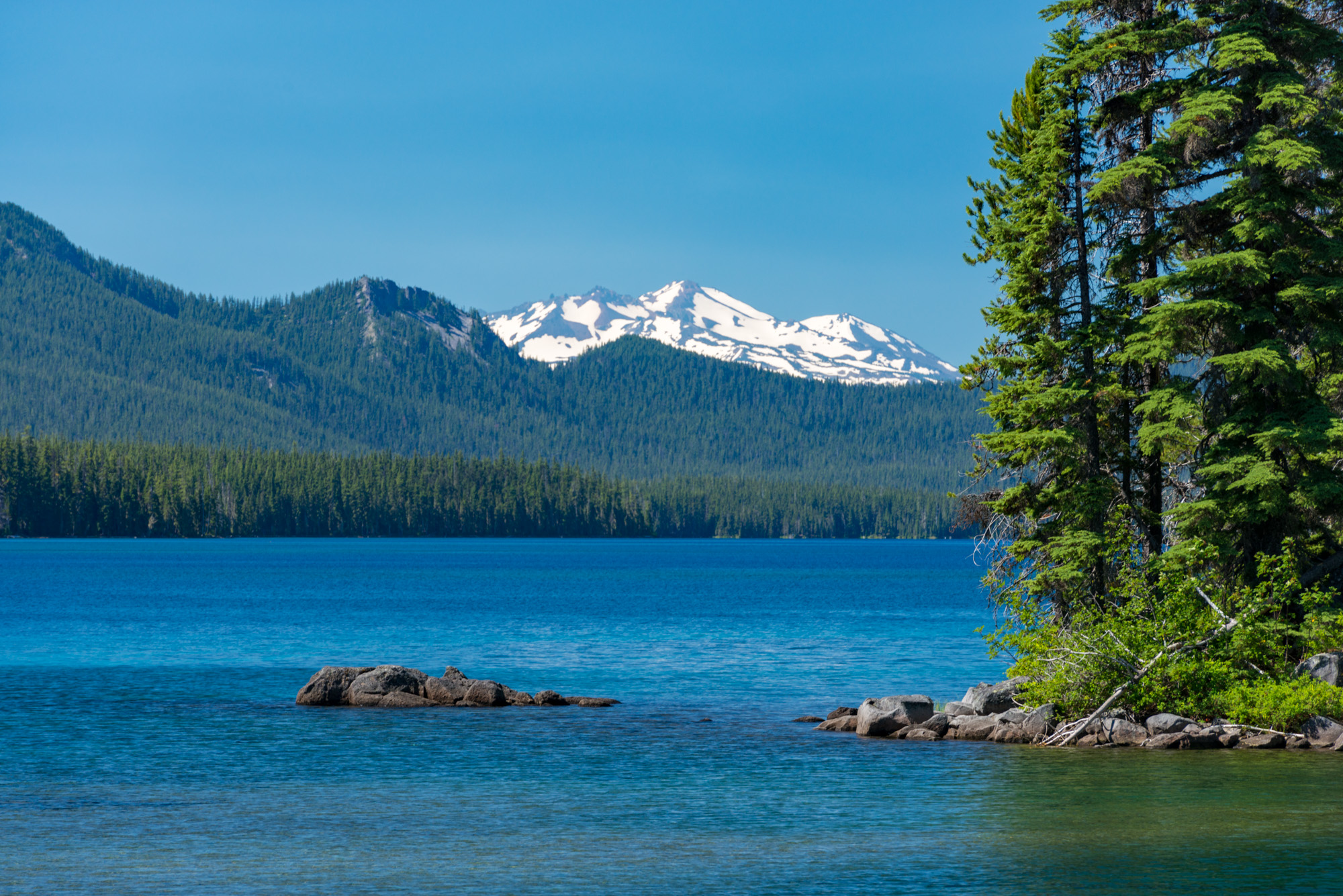
Waldo Lake with Diamond Peak in background

Waldo Lake has a surface area of 9.8 square miles (25 km^{2}). This makes it the eighth largest lake in Oregon. It has an average depth of 128 feet (39 m) with a maximum depth of 420 feet (130 m). This makes Waldo the second deepest lake in the state after Crater Lake. Like Crater Lake, Waldo Lake is ultraoligotrophic (having extremely clear water with very little organic material). It has no permanent inlet to carry nutrients into the lake for plant growth. As such, on a clear day one can see depths of up to 120 feet (36.5 m). The lake was restocked with trout every other year, until 1990 when efforts to preserve the water clarity halted the practice. The lake has a 10 miles per hour (16 km/h) speed limit for boats, but in 2010 gasoline motors were banned while electric motors are still allowed.

=== Recreation ===
- Fishing
- Boating
- Hiking
- Campgrounds:
  - North Waldo
  - Shadow Bay
  - Gold Lake
  - Taylor Burn
  - Islet

Waldo Lake is a very popular recreation site in the summer months. There are 205 designated campsites total among the campgrounds and an additional 50 primitive tent sites around the lake.

== Surrounding area ==
Besides the lake, the area includes the Waldo Lake Wilderness. Additionally, the Pacific Crest Trail passes through the area. The lake is also the source of the North Fork Middle Fork Willamette River. There are numerous alpine lakes and small mountain peaks around Waldo Lake.

Waldo Lake and the surrounding area is part of the Willamette National Forest .

== See also ==
- List of lakes in Oregon
