= Charles Meigs (politician) =

American politician

Charles R. Meigs

Delegate to the Oregon Constitutional Convention
- In office 1857
- Constituency: Wasco County

Personal details
- Born: 1831 Connecticut, United States
- Died: 1883 (aged 51–52) Ottawa, Kansas, United States
- Party: Democratic Party

Charles R. Meigs (1831 – 1883) was an American lawyer and politician who served as a delegate to the Oregon Constitutional Convention representing Wasco County. He was the only delegate representing the territory east of Cascade Mountains.

During the convention he wanted to make Cascades the eastern border of the state. In this he was supported by Delazon Smith and his own plans of making Oregon a coastal state centered on the Willamette River valley. But due to these plans, he has been accused of following the self-interest of his hometown, The Dalles city, and his proposal is denied.

In 1864 he was admitted by the Supreme Court as a prosecuting attorney, but after that he left the state.

== See also ==
- Greater Idaho movement
