= Oregon Constitutional Convention =

1857 constitutional convention in Salem, Oregon

- Seal of the Oregon Territory
- Date: August 17 to September 18, 1857
- Location: Salem, Oregon North America
- Also known as: Constitutional Convention of 1857
- Participants: see below
- Outcome: Created Oregon Constitution

The Oregon Constitutional Convention in 1857 drafted the Oregon Constitution in preparation for the Oregon Territory to become a U.S. state. Held from mid-August through September, 60 men met in Salem, Oregon, and created the foundation for Oregon's law. The proposal passed with a vote of 35 for adoption to 10 against. Oregon then became the 33rd state of the Union on February 14, 1859.

== History ==
=== Background ===
In June 1846 the Oregon Question was decided with the United States gaining sole possession of all disputed land south of the 49th degree of latitude. Afterward, on August 14, 1848, the United States government created the Oregon Territory, and in 1853 the northern and eastern sections of the territory became the Washington Territory. In 1854 and 1855 bills in the Territorial Legislature pressing for statehood for the territory were defeated.

Finally on December 12, 1856, the legislature passed a bill authorizing a convention to establish a constitution. On June 1, 1857, the voters in the territory approved the resolution and elected delegates to a constitutional convention. The vote was 7,209 in favor of holding a convention to 1,616 against the proposal.

=== Convention ===
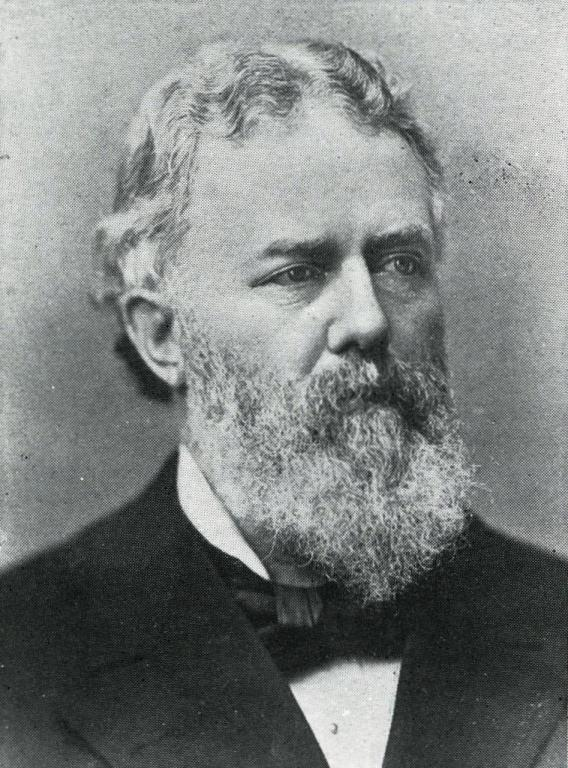
Matthew Deady, president of the convention

On August 17, 1857, 60 delegates selected by the voters met in Salem to write a state constitution in preparation of statehood. The convention assembled at the Salem Courthouse, with Asa Lovejoy named president pro tem of the gathering. On the following day Judge Matthew Deady was elected the permanent president of the convention.

The delegates selected officers, set up rules for the meeting (a total of 45 in all), and divided into committees on various subjects such as military, judicial, legislative, and elections. At the convention, Chester N. Terry was elected as the secretary of the group, while several people served at different times as the chairperson including Lovejoy, William W. Bristow, Delazon Smith, and La Fayette Grover. The group also settled the debate over a disputed seat at the convention in favor of Perry B. Marple over F. G. Lockhart to represent Coos County.

Thirty-four of the delegates were farmers, while 18 were lawyers, including the three justices of the Oregon Supreme Court. Two of the delegates were newspaper editors, five were miners, and another was a civil engineer.

The main debates concerning a constitution revolved around slavery and the exclusion of Blacks, liquor laws, and what would be the boundaries of the new state. After meeting for 31 days, the convention ended on September 18, when the delegates voted to approve the document as the constitution. The final tally was 35 votes for passage and 10 against; 15 members of the convention were absent and did not vote.

=== Draft Constitution ===
The document approved by the convention was modeled after Indiana's 1851 Constitution and included a provision that denied the right to vote to "negro, Chinaman or mulatto" citizens in the state to be, and though female suffrage was discussed, women were also denied the right to vote, as was typical of the era.

Provision was made for the ability of the legislature to regulate the immigration into the state of "persons not qualified to become citizens of the United States," thereby allowing legislative restriction of the number of free blacks coming into the state in the event that an outright ban did not achieve majority approval. Another section forbade any "Chinaman" who immigrated into the state after adoption of the constitution from ever owning real estate or working a mining claim, expressly giving the legislature power to enforce this provision.

Even as far back as the 1880s such racial measures were regarded as socially retrograde, with historian Hubert Howe Bancroft remarking:

These proscriptive clauses, however they may appear in later times, were in accordance with the popular sentiment on the Pacific coast and throughout a large portion of the United States ... However that may be, the founders of the state government in Oregon were fully determined to indulge themselves in their prejudices against color, and the qualities which accompany the black and yellow skinned races.

The final draft submitted to the populace contained a total of 18 articles. Over half of the document's content was derived in part from the Indiana constitution.

=== Members ===
Of the 60 delegates in the convention, exactly half were farmers and an additional 19 were lawyers. All members of the convention and what county they represented:

County	Delegate	Birth Place	Work	Political Party
Benton County	John Kelsay	Kentucky	Farmer	Democrat
Benton County	Haman Lewis	New York	Farmer	Democrat
Benton County	William Matzger	Germany	Mechanic	Anti-Democrat
Benton County	Henry B. Nichols	Connecticut	Farmer	Anti-Democrat
Clackamas County	Hector Campbell	Massachusetts	Farmer	Democrat
Clackamas County	James K. Kelly	Pennsylvania	Lawyer	Democrat
Clackamas County	Asa Lovejoy	Massachusetts	Lawyer	Democrat
Clackamas County	Nathaniel Robbins	Virginia	Farmer	Democrat
Clackamas County	William Starkweather	Connecticut	Farmer	Democrat
Clatsop County	Cyrus Olney	New York	Lawyer	Democrat
Columbia County	John W. Watts	Missouri	Physician	Anti-Democrat
Coos County	Perry B. Marple	Virginia	Farmer	Democrat
Curry County	William Packwood	Illinois	Miner	Anti-Democrat
Douglas County	Stephen Chadwick	Connecticut	Lawyer	Democrat
Douglas County	Matthew Deady	Maryland	Lawyer	Democrat
Douglas County	Solomon Fitzhugh	Kentucky	Farmer	Democrat
Douglas County	Thomas Whitted	Ohio	Farmer	Democrat
Jackson County	Legrand J. C. Duncan	Tennessee	Miner	Democrat
Jackson County	Daniel Newcomb	Virginia	Farmer	Democrat
Jackson County	Paine Page Prim	Tennessee	Lawyer	Democrat
Jackson County	J. H. Reed	Pennsylvania	Lawyer	Democrat
Josephine County	S. B. Hendershott	Illinois	Miner	Democrat
Josephine County	William H. Watkins	New York	Physician	Anti-Democrat
Lane County	Paul Brattain	North Carolina	Farmer	Democrat
Lane County	William W. Bristow	Kentucky	Farmer	Democrat
Lane County	Andrew J. Campbell	Indiana	Mechanic	Democrat
Lane County	Jesse Cox	Missouri	Farmer	Democrat
Lane County	Enoch Hoult	Virginia	Farmer	Democrat
Lane County	Isaac R. Moores	Illinois	Surveyor	Democrat
Linn County	Jonathan H. Brattain	Ohio	Farmer	Democrat
Linn County	Reuben Coyle	Kentucky	Farmer	Democrat
Linn County	John T. Crooks	Virginia	Farmer	Democrat
Linn County	Luther Elkins	Maine	Farmer	Democrat
Linn County	James Shields	Illinois	Farmer	Democrat
Linn County	Delazon Smith	New York	Lawyer	Democrat
Marion County	Joseph Cox	Ohio	Farmer	Democrat
Marion County	La Fayette Grover	Maine	Lawyer	Democrat
Marion County	Richard Miller	Maryland	Farmer	Democrat
Marion County	John C. Peebles	Pennsylvania	Farmer	Democrat
Marion County	Davis Shannon	Missouri	Farmer	Democrat
Marion County	Nicholas Shrum	Tennessee	Farmer	Democrat
Marion County	George Henry Williams	New York	Lawyer	Democrat
Multnomah County	Thomas Dryer	New York	Editor	Anti-Democrat
Multnomah County	William H. Farrar	New Hampshire	Lawyer	Democrat
Multnomah County	David Logan	North Carolina	Lawyer	Anti-Democrat
Multnomah County	S. J. McCormick	Ireland	Printer	Democrat
Polk County	Avery D. Babcock	New York	Lawyer	Democrat
Polk County	Reuben P. Boise	Massachusetts	Lawyer	Democrat
Polk County	Benjamin Franklin Burch	Missouri	Farmer	Democrat
Polk County	Frederick Waymire	Missouri	Mechanic	Democrat
Tillamook County	Avery D. Babcock	New York	Lawyer	Democrat
Umpqua County	Jesse Applegate	Kentucky	Farmer	Anti-Democrat
Umpqua County	Levi Scott	Illinois	Farmer	Anti-Democrat
Wasco County	Charles Meigs	Connecticut	Lawyer	Democrat
Washington County	Levi Anderson	Kentucky	Farmer	Anti-Democrat
Washington County	Thomas Dryer	New York	Editor	Anti-Democrat
Washington County	Erasmus Shattuck	Vermont	Lawyer	Anti-Democrat
Washington County	John S. White	Tennessee	Farmer	Anti-Democrat
Yamhill County	Robert Crouch Kinney	Illinois	Farmer	Anti-Democrat
Yamhill County	John R. McBride	Missouri	Lawyer	Republican
Yamhill County	Martin Olds	Massachusetts	Farmer	Anti-Democrat
Yamhill County	Robert V. Short	Pennsylvania	Surveyor	Democrat

=== Further development ===
On November 9, 1857, the voters approved the document to serve as a state constitution upon statehood. At this same vote, measures to allow slavery and to allow free Blacks to live in the state were defeated after they had been submitted as separate items to vote on by the convention. The vote to approve the constitution by the citizens of Oregon was 7,195 for the constitution and 3,215 against the document. The vote on slavery was 2,645 to allow slavery and 7,727 to make it illegal, and the vote to make it illegal for Blacks to live in the state was 8,640 to ban them and 1,081 to allow them to live in the state. All white men over the age of 21 were allowed to vote, and after the passage a delegation was sent east to Washington, D.C. to press for statehood.

Oregon then waited on the United States Congress to accept the constitution and approve Oregon for statehood. Due to the ongoing debate over slavery in the country as the nation approached the American Civil War, the U.S. Senate did not pass legislation to bring Oregon into the Union until 1859, when Oregon became the 33rd state on February 14. The Oregon Constitution was not altered until 1902.
