= Frank A. Moore =

American judge

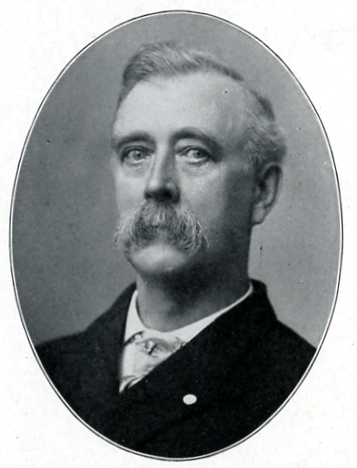

17th Chief Justice of the Oregon Supreme Court
- In office 1896 – 1898; 1902 – 1905; 1909 – 1911; 1915 – 1917
- Preceded by: Robert S. Bean; Thomas A. McBride
- Succeeded by: Charles E. Wolverton; Robert Eakin; Thomas A. McBride

33rd Justice of the Oregon Supreme Court
- In office 1892–1918
- Preceded by: Reuben S. Strahan
- Succeeded by: Conrad P. Olson

Personal details
- Born: November 5, 1844 Ellsworth, Maine
- Died: September 25, 1918 (aged 73) Salem, Oregon
- Party: Republican
- Spouse: Emma Shuntaffer

Frank A. Moore (November 5, 1844 – September 25, 1918) was an American politician and judge in the state of Oregon. He was the 17th Chief Justice of the Oregon Supreme Court. He is the only person to serve as chief justice for Oregon’s highest court on four occasions, and he spent 26 years overall on the bench. A native of Maine, he was also a two-time Republican member of the Oregon State Senate.

== Early life ==
Moore was born on November 5, 1844, in Ellsworth, Maine, to Heard L. Moore and Bathshaba Moore (née Higgins). Moore received his education in the public schools in Maine and at the state normal school in Iowa Falls, Iowa. After his education Moore became a county superintendent for schools in Hardin County, Iowa, serving from 1871 to 1875. He also read law in Eldora, Iowa, at this time under the tutelage of Enoch W. Eastman, the then lieutenant governor of Iowa. Moore passed the bar in Iowa in 1874, and practiced law in Eldora.

== Oregon ==
In 1877, Moore moved to Oregon and was practicing law in St. Helens, Oregon, and was admitted to the Oregon bar in January 1879. He remained in private practice there until 1884 when he was elected as judge for Columbia County. In 1888, Moore was elected as a state senator to the Oregon legislature. During the 1889 legislature he represented Columbia, Tillamook, and Washington counties. He won re-election in 1890 to the Oregon Senate

Moore was elected to the Oregon Supreme Court in 1892. He won re-election to additional six-year terms in 1898, 1904, 1910, and 1916. Moore then served as chief justice four times: 1896 to 1898, 1902 to 1905, 1909 to 1911, and 1915 to 1917. Moore died while in office on September 25, 1918, and was replaced by Conrad P. Olson.

== Family ==
Frank A. Moore was married to Emma Shuntaffer on April 15, 1866. They had three children together. Moore was buried at City View Cemetery in Salem, Oregon. Moore was a Republican. He was a Mason and a member of the Benevolent and Protective Order of Elks.
