= La Fayette Grover =

American politician (1823–1911)

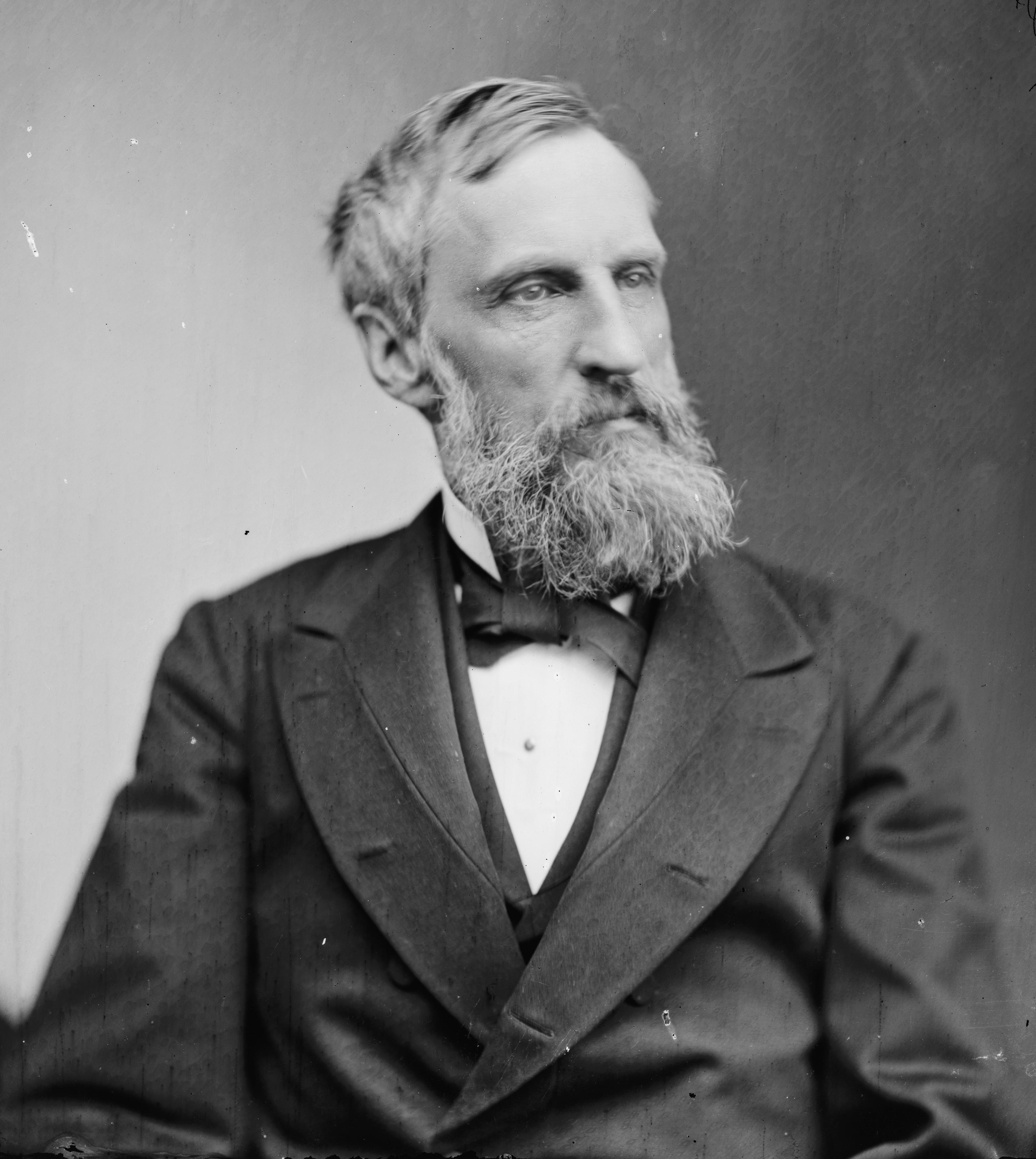
- Grover, 1865–1880

4th Governor of Oregon
- In office September 14, 1870 – February 1, 1877
- Preceded by: George L. Woods
- Succeeded by: Stephen F. Chadwick

United States Senator from Oregon
- In office March 4, 1877 – March 3, 1883
- Preceded by: James K. Kelly
- Succeeded by: Joseph N. Dolph

Member of the U.S. House of Representatives from Oregon's At-large district
- In office February 14, 1859 – March 3, 1859
- Preceded by: None (Position created)
- Succeeded by: Lansing Stout

Personal details
- Born: November 29, 1823 Bethel, Maine, U.S.
- Died: May 10, 1911 (aged 87) Portland, Oregon, U.S.
- Party: Democratic
- Spouse: Elizabeth Carter
- Profession: Lawyer

La Fayette Grover (November 29, 1823 – May 10, 1911) was a Democratic politician and lawyer from the U.S. state of Oregon. He was the fourth governor of Oregon, represented Oregon in the United States House of Representatives, and served one term in the United States Senate.

== Biography ==
Grover was born in Bethel, Maine, and was educated at Bethel's Gould Academy and Brunswick's Bowdoin College. He studied law and earned entry into the bar association in Philadelphia in 1850. He moved to Oregon in 1851 and began his law practice in Salem.

== Career ==
The Oregon Territorial legislature elected him prosecuting attorney for Oregon's second judicial district and auditor of public accounts for the Oregon Territory. From 1853 to 1855, he was a member of the Territorial House of Representatives. In 1854, he was appointed by the United States Department of the Interior a member of a commission sent to audit the claims from the Rogue River Indian War. He was appointed by the Secretary of War in 1856 to a board of commissioners to audit the Indian war expenses of Oregon and Washington.

=== After statehood ===
In 1857, he was a delegate to the Oregon Constitutional Convention, representing Marion County. When Oregon gained statehood, he was elected to the 35th United States Congress as Oregon's member of the House of Representatives, serving from February 15, 1859, to March 4, 1859. He did not run for reelection in 1858, and resumed his law practice and the manufacture of woolens.

Grover was elected Governor of Oregon in 1870 and was reelected in 1874. He served as governor until 1877, when he resigned to serve in the United States Senate. Grover served in the Senate from March 4, 1877, to March 3, 1883, serving in the 46th United States Congress as the chairman of the Senate Committee on Manufactures. He did not run for reelection in 1883.

=== Electoral college dispute ===
During the 1876 Presidential Election, Oregon's statewide result clearly favored Rutherford Hayes, but then-governor Grover claimed that elector John Watts was constitutionally ineligible to vote since he was an "elected or appointed official". Grover substituted a Democratic elector in his place. The two Republican electors dismissed Grover's action and each reported three votes for Hayes, while the Democratic elector, C. A. Cronin, reported one vote for Samuel Tilden and two votes for Hayes. The vote was critical because the electoral college without John Watts's vote was tied 184–184. A 15-member Electoral Commission ultimately awarded all three of Oregon's votes to Hayes.

== Death ==
Grover resumed his law practice, retiring from public life. He died at his home in Portland, Oregon, on May 10, 1911, and was interred in River View Cemetery.

== Selected works ==
- Grover, La Fayette (1874). Report of Governor Grover to General Schofield on the Modoc War : and reports of Major General John F. Miller and General John E. Ross, to the Governor : also letter of the governor to the Secretary of the Interior on the Wallowa Valley Indian question. Salem, OR: M.V. Brown, State Printer.

Party political offices
Preceded by James K. Kelly	Democratic nominee for Governor of Oregon; 1870, 1874	Succeeded by W. W. Thayer
U.S. House of Representatives
Preceded by Position created	Member of the U.S. House of Representatives from Oregon's at-large congressional district February 14, 1859 – March 3, 1859	Succeeded by Lansing Stout
Political offices
Preceded by George L. Woods	Governor of Oregon; 1870–1877	Succeeded by Stephen F. Chadwick
U.S. Senate
Preceded by James K. Kelly	U.S. senator (Class 2) from Oregon; 1877–1883; Served alongside: John H. Mitchell, James H. Slater	Succeeded by Joseph N. Dolph
