= W. W. Thayer =

American judge and 6th Governor of Oregon

William W. Thayer
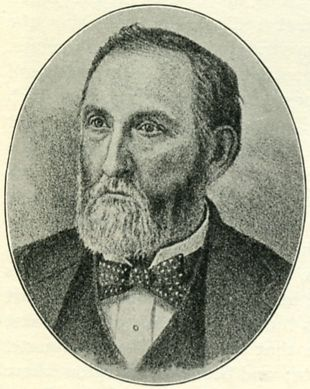
- Portrait of Thayer, 1919

6th Governor of Oregon
- In office September 11, 1878 – September 13, 1882
- Preceded by: Stephen F. Chadwick
- Succeeded by: Z.F. Moody

30th Justice of the Oregon Supreme Court
- In office 1884–1890
- Preceded by: Edward B. Watson
- Succeeded by: Robert S. Bean

14th Chief Justice of the Oregon Supreme Court
- In office 1888–1890
- Preceded by: William Paine Lord
- Succeeded by: Reuben S. Strahan

Personal details
- Born: July 15, 1827 Lima, New York, US
- Died: October 15, 1899 (aged 72) Portland, Oregon, US
- Party: Democratic
- Spouse: Samantha C. Thayer
- Profession: Lawyer

William Wallace Thayer (July 15, 1827 – October 15, 1899), was an American Democratic politician active in U.S. states of Idaho and Oregon. Most notably, he served as the sixth governor of Oregon from 1878 to 1882 and Chief Justice of the Oregon Supreme Court from 1888 to 1889.

== Background ==
Thayer was born on a farm near Lima, New York, on July 15, 1827. He received a public education before studying law in college. He was admitted to the New York State Bar in 1851. He then practiced law with his brother in Buffalo and later Tonawanda.

A mining boom in Idaho Territory caught Thayer's attention in 1860, prompting him to move west. He arrived in Corvallis, Oregon, in 1861, where he joined his brother and former U.S. Representative Andrew J. Thayer, at his law firm. In 1863, he would finally move to Idaho, setting up his own law firm in Lewiston.

== Political career in Idaho ==
In 1866, three years after moving to Lewiston, Thayer was elected district attorney for the Third Judicial District of Idaho Territory. From 1866 until 1867, he moved to Boise to serve for a session of the Idaho Territory House of Representatives. He moved to Portland, Oregon, shortly after leaving the legislature.

== Early political career in Oregon ==
Upon returning to Oregon, Thayer established a successful law firm in the city of East Portland. At this time, he became an active member of the Democratic Party. During the 1876 Hayes-Tilden Presidential Election dispute, Thayer was a member of the legal team which challenged the certification of J. W. Watts, a Republican elector for Rutherford B. Hayes. Although successful, this challenge did not help Samuel Tilden prevail in the Electoral College.

Still appreciative of his assistance in the Watts Case, the Oregon State Democratic Party nominated Thayer for governor in 1878. Thayer would win narrowly over Republican Cornelius C. Beekman, by a margin of 59 votes.

== Governorship ==
Thayer's time in office is remembered as a fiscally conservative, anti-corruption administration, which sought to make the state bureaucracy more efficient. The State Board of Equalization, land law reforms, and the establishment of a state mental hospital were initiated under his leadership. He would eliminate the state's debt while in office.

Governor Thayer often spoke out about the state's finances. Highly criticized by Thayer was the process by which the state legislature based its budget appropriations. He called for revenue projections to be based on actual revenues, not what was anticipated as the legislature had often done in the past. He also refused to fund the completion of the State Capitol Building, stating that the building was too expensive and lavish for Oregon.

His lasting legacy was reforming the Supreme Court of Oregon into its present incarnation by statute. Previously, Circuit Court judges served as justices of the Supreme Court. After the statute change, Supreme Court positions were made a separate, directly elected office.

== Chief Justice of the Oregon Supreme Court ==
Thayer declined to run for a second term in the 1882 gubernatorial election. Instead, he successfully ran a campaign for justice of the Supreme Court in 1884, winning a six-year term on the bench. Justice Thayer remained on the bench until 1890, the last two years of that term serving as chief justice.

Thayer died in Portland on October 15, 1899, with interment at Lone Fir Cemetery in that city.

Party political offices
Preceded by La Fayette Grover	Democratic nominee for Governor of Oregon; 1878	Succeeded by Joseph Showalter Smith
Political offices
Preceded by Stephen F. Chadwick	Governor of Oregon; 1878–1882	Succeeded by Z. F. Moody
Legal offices
Preceded by Edward B. Watson	Justice of the Oregon Supreme Court; 1884–1890	Succeeded by Robert S. Bean
Preceded by William Paine Lord	14th Chief Justice of the Oregon Supreme Court; 1888–1890	Succeeded by Reuben S. Strahan
