= William Paine Lord =

9th Governor of Oregon

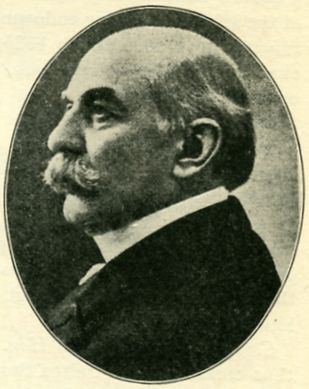

15th United States Minister to Argentina
- In office February 14, 1900 – March 27, 1903
- Preceded by: William I. Buchanan
- Succeeded by: John Barrett

9th Governor of Oregon
- In office January 14, 1895 – January 9, 1899
- Preceded by: Sylvester Pennoyer
- Succeeded by: T. T. Geer

Personal details
- Born: July 20, 1838 Dover, Delaware, U.S.
- Died: February 17, 1911 (aged 72) San Francisco, California, U.S.
- Party: Republican
- Spouse: Juliette Montague
- Children: Montague Lord, William Paine Lord, Elizabeth Blodget Lord
- Education: Fairfield College; Albany College
- Profession: Lawyer

William Paine Lord (July 20, 1838 – February 17, 1911) was an American Republican politician who served as the ninth governor of Oregon from 1895 to 1899. The Delaware native previously served as the 27th justice of the Oregon Supreme Court, including three times as the chief justice of that court. After serving as governor he was appointed as an ambassador to Argentina and later helped to codify Oregon's laws.

== Early life ==
He was born to Edward and Elizabeth (Paine) Lord on July 20, 1838 in Dover, Delaware. He received his primary education at a Quaker school and through private tutoring. He subsequently studied law at Fairfield College, graduating in 1860. Before he could continue further into his studies, Lord volunteered for military service in the American Civil War, advancing to the rank of Major in the 1st Delaware Cavalry in the Union Army of the Potomac.

Once the war ended, Lord continued in law school at Albany College in New York, graduating there in 1866. He then returned to the military for a second time, re-enlisting at the rank of lieutenant. His duties would include postings at Alcatraz in San Francisco and Fort Steilacoom near Tacoma, Washington. When the United States took formal possession of Alaska in 1867, Lt. Lord was sent to Sitka. In 1868, Lord resigned from the army in order to set up a law practice in Salem, Oregon.

== Entry into politics ==
William Paine Lord soon became involved in politics, as he became Salem's City Attorney in 1870. His first elected office was a state Senate seat in 1878. He resigned his Senate seat for a successful run as the Republican nominee for Justice of the Oregon Supreme Court. Lord served on the court from 1880 until 1894. He was a popular justice and had a reputation of being the most competent jurist in state history, serving out his last term as Chief Justice.

He accepted the Republican nomination for the 1894 Oregon governor's race, stepping down from the court after his gubernatorial election victory.

== Governorship ==
William Lord was popular and he was easily elected to the Governor's Office. He immediately set out to support higher education, eliminate corruption from land speculators, and fueled support for the direct election of United States Senators, when the Senate refused to seat Henry W. Corbett, Lord's appointee. In 1895, the University of Oregon conferred an honorary doctorate of laws degree on the governor.

He promoted ending the corrupt land speculation practices of the time by creating the State Land Board, headed by an official State Land Agent. The present land-use system protecting Oregon's wildlife and fisheries would evolve from this early agency.

The 1897 House failed to organize, caught up on a dispute over the reelection of U.S. Senator John H. Mitchell.

Lord also called for a constitutional amendment to the Oregon Constitution allowing the Governor a line item veto. While nothing came of this during his term of office, later governors would support Lord's proposal. The line item veto was finally approved in 1916.

Lord lost his bid for a second term, in the closely fought 1898 primary election campaign against fellow Republican Theodore T. Geer.

== Later life ==
Shortly after leaving the Governor's Office, Lord was appointed the U.S. Minister (Ambassador) to Argentina by the McKinley Administration. He served in that capacity until 1902, after which he returned to Oregon.

In 1902, William Paine Lord was appointed as Code Commissioner by the Supreme Court of Oregon. In this position, which he held until 1910, he examined and annotated all existing Oregon Statute Laws, compiling them into three volumex, Lord's Oregon Laws – officially the Oregon Statute Code of 1909.

In 1910 Lord retired to San Francisco, where he would die on February 17, 1911. His body was returned to Oregon where it is interred in Mount Crest Abbey Mausoleum in Salem.

Party political offices
Preceded by David P. Thompson	Republican nominee for Governor of Oregon; 1894	Succeeded by Theodore Thurston Geer
Political offices
Preceded by Sylvester Pennoyer	Governor of Oregon; 1895–1899	Succeeded by T. T. Geer
Legal offices
Preceded by Reuben P. Boise	27th Justice of the Oregon Supreme Court; 1880–1894	Succeeded by Charles E. Wolverton
Preceded by James K. Kelly	11th Chief Justice of the Oregon Supreme Court; 1878–1880, 1886–1888, 1892–1894	Succeeded by Robert S. Bean
Diplomatic posts
Preceded by William I. Buchanan	United States Minister Resident, Argentina; February 14, 1900 – March 27, 1903	Succeeded by John Barrett
