= List of members of the Oregon Territorial Legislature =

First Speaker of the House of the Oregon Territorial Legislature Asa Lovejoy (1808-1882)

The Oregon Territorial Legislature was the legislative branch of the government of the Oregon Territory of the United States, from 1849 to 1858. The legislature was a bicameral body, including a larger "House of Representatives," headed by a Speaker of the House, and a 9-member "Council," headed by the President of the Council. With the coming of Oregon statehood in 1859, the Oregon Territorial Legislature was supplanted by a new body, the Oregon Legislative Assembly.

This list includes all members of the Oregon Territorial Legislature, divided first by year of the annual session, secondarily divided alphabetically by legislative body. Political parties are indicated when known (D-Democratic, W-Whig, FS-Free Soil Party, R-Republican).

== 1849 ==
The 1st Oregon Territorial Legislative Session was held from July 16 to September 29, 1849. Although there were 18 legislative districts for the House, only 17 names appear in archival records of the session, no representative for District 5 being indicated.

House (Speaker: Asa L. Lovejoy)

- Samuel T. Burch, Polk
- William W. Chapman, D-Champoeg
- Jacob S. Conser, Linn
- John Alexander Dunlap, Linn
- Absalom J. Hembree, D-Yamhill
- David Hill, Tualatin
- James Duval Holman, Clackamas
- H. N. V. Holmes, Polk
- William M. King, Polk
- Robert Crouch Kinney, W-Yamhill
- Asa L. Lovejoy, D-Clackamas
- William Tyndall Matlock, Champoeg
- Charles J. Mulkey, Benton
- Michael T. Simmons, Clatsop, Lewis, & Vancouver
- Green Berry Smith, Benton
- Gabriel Walling, Clackamas
- Jerome B. Walling, Yamhill

Council (President: Samuel Parker)

- Wilson Blain, Tualatin
- William Wentworth Buck, Clackamas
- Nathaniel Ford, Polk
- James B. Graves, Yamhill
- Augustus L. Humphrey, Benton
- Washington B. Maley, Linn
- Samuel T. McKean, Clatsop, Lewis, & Vancouver
- Samuel Parker, Champoeg
- Wesley Shannon, Champoeg

== 1850 ==
The 2nd Oregon Territorial Legislative Session was held from December 2, 1850 to February 8, 1851.

House (Speaker: Ralph Wilcox)

- William Allphin, D-Linn
- Joseph C. Avery, D-Benton
- Hector Campbell, Clackamas
- Matthew Deady, D-Yamhill
- Samuel M. Gilmore, Yamhill
- Benjamin F. Harding, D-Marion
- H. N. V. Holmes, Polk
- William M. King, D-Washington
- William Tyndall Matlock, W-Clackamas
- William Parker, Marion
- Truman P. Powers, Clackamas, Lewis & Clark
- Aaron Payne, Yamhill
- William T. Shaw, Marion
- Benjamin Simpson, Clackamas
- Wayman St. Clair, Benton
- John Thorp, Polk
- Elias L. Walters, Linn
- Ralph Wilcox, Washington

Council (President: William W. Buck)

- William Wentworth Buck, Clackamas
- Lawrence Hall, Washington
- Augustus L. Humphrey, Benton
- James McBride, Yamhill
- Samuel T. McKean, Clatsop, Clark, & Lewis
- Washington B. Maley, Linn
- Richard Miller, Marion
- Samuel Parker, Marion
- Frederick Waymire, Polk

== 1851 ==
The 3rd Oregon Territorial Legislative Session was held from December 1, 1851 to January 21, 1852. The size of the House of Representatives expanded from its original 18 to 22 members effective with this session.

House (Speaker: William M. King)

- William Allphine, Linn
- John A. Anderson, D-Clatsop & Pacific
- Joseph C. Avery, D-Benton
- Zebulon C. Bishop, Washington
- Daniel F. Brownfield, W-Clatsop & Pacific
- Wilie W. Chapman, D-Marion
- George Edward Cole, Benton
- George Law Curry, Clackamas
- James Davidson, D-Marion
- Joseph W. Drew, Umpqua
- Nathaniel Ford, D-Polk
- Absalom J. Hembree, D-Yamhill
- James S. Holman, Polk
- William M. King, Washington
- Robert Crouch Kinney, Yamhill
- William Tyndall Matlock, Clackamas
- Samuel McSween, Yamhill
- David M. Risdon, Lane
- Benjamin Simpson, D-Marion
- Aaron E. Waite, W-Clackamas
- Luther White, Linn
- Ralph Wilcox, Washington

Council (President: Samuel Parker)

- Matthew Deady, D-Yamhill
- Joseph M. Garrison, Marion
- Lawrence Hall, Washington
- Augustus L. Humphrey, Benton, Lane, & Umpqua
- Columbia Lancaster, D-Clarke & Lewis
- Asa L. Lovejoy, D-Clackamas
- Washington B. Maley, Linn
- Samuel Parker, D-Marion
- Frederick Waymire, Polk

== 1852 ==
The 4th Oregon Territorial Legislative Session was held from December 6, 1852 to February 3, 1853. The size of the House of Representatives expanded once again, this time from 22 to 25 members effective with this session.

House (Speaker: Benjamin F. Harding)

- John A. Anderson, Clatsop & Pacific
- Thomas N. Aubrey, Lane
- Joseph C. Avery, D-Benton
- John Carey, Yamhill
- Francis A. Chenoweth, W-Clark & Lewis
- George Edward Cole, D-Benton
- Jacob S. Conser, Marion
- Royal Cottle, Linn
- James Curl, Linn
- Edward J. Curtis, Douglas
- Isaac N. Ebey, Thurston
- James Monroe Fulkerson, Polk
- Addison Crandall Gibbs, W-Umpqua
- John R. Hardin, Jackson
- Benjamin F. Harding, Marion
- H. N. V. Holmes, Polk
- Franklin B. Martin, Yamhill
- William Tyndall Matlock, Clackamas
- Israel Mitchell, Washington
- John Richardson, Yamhill
- Benjamin Simpson, Marion
- Benjamin Stark, Washington
- Milton Tuttle, Washington
- Aaron E. Waite, Clackamas
- Lot Whitcomb, Clackamas

Council (President: Matthew Deady)

- Matthew Deady, D-Yamhill
- Joseph M. Garrison, D-Marion
- Lawrence Hall, W-Washington
- Augustus L. Humphrey, D-Benton & Lane
- Asa L. Lovejoy, W-Clackamas
- Lucius W. Phelps, W-Linn
- Levi Scott, W-Umpqua, Douglas & Jackson
- Fredrick Waymire, D-Polk

== 1853 ==
The 5th Oregon Territorial Legislative Session was held from December 5, 1853 to February 2, 1854. A 26th member was added to the House of Representatives effective with this session.

House (Speaker: Zebulon C. Bishop)

- George H. Ambrose, D-Jackson
- James A. Bennett, D-Benton
- Zebulon C. Bishop, D-Washington
- Reuben P. Boise, D-Polk & Tillamook
- Lafayette F. Cartee, D-Clackamas
- Fendal Carr Cason, D-Clackamas
- B. F. Chapman, D-Benton
- Elias F. Colby, D-Marion
- Albert Alonzo Durham, W-Washington
- Luther Elkins, D-Linn
- Washington Smith Gilliam, D-Polk
- Stephen Goff, W-Lane
- La Fayette Grover, D-Marion
- Henry G. Hadley, D-Lane
- Orlando Humason, D-Yamhill
- Benjamin B. Jackson, D-Clackamas
- Franklin B. Martin, D-Yamhill
- John F. Miller, D-Jackson
- Joab W. Moffitt, D-Clatsop
- Chauncey Nye, W-Jackson
- John C. Peebles, D-Marion
- Andrew J. Shuck, D-Yamhill
- Isaac N. Smith, D-Linn
- Lewis S. Thompson, W-Douglas
- Robert Thompson, D-Washington
- Alexander B. Westerfield, D-Yamhill

Council (President: Ralph Wilcox)

- Augustus L. Humphrey, D-Benton & Lane
- James K. Kelly, D-Clackamas
- Truman P. Powers, D-Clatsop
- Lucius W. Phelps, D-Linn
- Benjamin Simpson, D-Marion
- James Monroe Fulkerson, D-Polk
- Levi Scott, Umpqua, W-Douglas & Jackson
- Ralph Wilcox, D-Washington
- John Richardson, D-Yamhill

== 1854 ==
The 6th Oregon Territorial Legislative Session was held from December 4, 1854 to February 1, 1855.

House (Speaker: Lafayette F. Cartee)

- David H. Belknap, Washington
- Hugh L. Brown, Linn
- Ira F. M. Butler, Polk
- Lafayette F. Cartee, Clackamas
- George W. Coffinberry, Clatsop
- James B. Condon, Columbia
- Clark P. Crandall, Marion
- Charles S. Drew, Jackson
- Patrick Dunn, Jackson
- Luther Elkins, Linn
- Nathaniel Ford, Marion
- James F. Gazley, Douglas
- Ralph Carey Geer, Marion
- Jacob Gillespie, Lane
- Absalom J. Hembree, Yamhill
- Anson G. Henry, Yamhill
- Rowland B. Hinton, Benton
- H. N. V. Holmes, Polk
- Orlando Humason, Wasco
- Robert Ladd, Umpqua
- David Logan, Multnomah
- Asa L. Lovejoy, Clackamas
- Alex McIntire, Jackson
- Andrew W. Patterson, Lane
- Delazon Smith, Linn
- William A. Starkweather, Clackamas
- Wayman St. Clair, Benton
- Elisha S. Tanner, Washington
- Jesse Walker, Jackson

Council (President: James K. Kelly)

- E. H. Cleaveland, Jackson
- James Monroe Fulkerson, Polk
- George W. Greer, Columbia & Washington
- Augustus L. Humphrey, Benton & Lane
- James K. Kelly, Clackamas & Wasco
- John C. Peebles, Marion
- Lucius W. Phelps, Linn
- John Richardson, Yamhill
- Levi Scott, Umpqua & Douglas

== 1855 ==
The 7th Oregon Territorial Legislative Session was held from December 1, 1855 to January 31, 1856.

House (Speaker: Delazon Smith)

- Major C. Barkwell, Jackson
- Reuben P. Boise, Polk & Tillamook
- George Briggs, Jackson
- George W. Brown, Multnomah
- Hugh L. Brown, Linn
- Heman C. Buckingham, Benton
- Augustus R. Burbank, Yamhill
- Philo Callender, Clatsop
- Jonathan M. Cozad, Umpqua
- Nathaniel H. Gates, Wasco
- Bunnell Payne Grant, Linn
- La Fayette Grover, Marion
- John E. Hale, Jackson
- William P. Harpole, Marion
- John Harris, Columbia
- John M. Harrison, Marion
- William Hutson, Douglas
- Hyer Jackson, Multnomah & Washington
- Horatio Van Veighton Johnson, Washington
- Andrew McAlexander, Lane
- Isaac R. Moores, Lane
- James Officer, Clackamas
- Orville Risley, Clackamas
- John Robinson, Benton
- Andrew J. Shuck, Yamhill
- Delazon Smith, Linn
- Thomas Smith, Jackson
- Hiram Straight, Clackamas
- William Tichenor, Coos
- Frederick Waymire, Polk

Council (President: Ammi P. Dennison)

- Ammi P. Dennison, Multnomah
- Charles Drain, Linn
- James Monroe Fulkerson, Polk & Tillamook
- James K. Kelly, Clackamas & Wasco
- Noah Huber, Yamhill
- Hugh D. O'Bryant, Umpqua, Douglas & Coos
- John C. Peebles, Marion
- John E. Ross, Jackson
- Avery A. Smith, Benton & Lane

== 1856 ==
The 8th Oregon Territorial Legislative Session was held from December 1, 1856 to January 29, 1857.

House (Speaker: La Fayette Grover)

- William Allen, Yamhill
- Joseph C. Avery, Benton
- Samuel E. Barr, Columbia
- James A. Bennett, Benton
- Alexander M. Berry, Jackson & Josephine
- George W. Brown, Multnomah
- Hugh L. Brown, Linn
- Robert B. Cochran, Lane
- Felix A. Collard, Clackamas
- Jacob S. Conser, Marion
- Thomas J. Dryer, Multnomah & Washington
- Nathaniel H. Gates, Wasco
- La Fayette Grover, Marion
- William P. Harpole, Marion
- Horatio Van Veighton Johnson, Washington
- Asa L. Lovejoy, Clackamas
- William J. Matthews, Josephine
- Joab W. Moffitt, Clatsop
- James S. Monroe, Lane
- William Ray, Linn
- Amos E. Rogers, Coos & Curry
- Aaron Rose, Douglas
- Andrew J. Shuck, Yamhill
- Delazon Smith, Linn
- Thomas Smith, Jackson
- John Stanton Miller, Jackson
- William. A. Starkweather, Clackamas
- Walter M. Walker, Polk & Tillamook
- Andrew J. Welch, Polk
- David C. Underwood, Umpqua

Council (President: James K. Kelly)

- James R. Bayley, Yamhill & Clatsop
- Thomas R. Cornelius, Washington, Multnomah, & Columbia
- Charles Drain, Linn
- Nathaniel Ford, Polk & Tillamook
- James K. Kelly, Clackamas & Wasco
- Hugh D. O'Bryant, Umpqua, Douglas & Coos
- John C. Peebles, Marion
- John E. Ross, Jackson
- Avery A. Smith, Lane & Benton

== 1857 ==
The 9th Oregon Territorial Legislative Session was held from December 7, 1857 to February 5, 1858. There were also Special Pre-Admission Sessions held from July 5 to 9, 1858 and from September 13 to 14, 1858.

House (Speaker: Ira F. M. Butler)

- George Able, Marion
- William Allen, Yamhill
- Ransom S. Belknap, Jackson & Josephine
- H. H. Brown, Jackson
- Hugh L. Brown, Linn
- Ira F. M. Butler, Polk
- Eli C. Cooley, Marion
- Felix A. Collard, Clackamas
- James Cole, Umpqua
- Anderson Cox, Linn
- Nelson H. Cranor, Linn
- Thomas J. Dryer, Multnomah & Washington
- Nathaniel H. Gates, Wasco
- Samuel P. Gilliland, Clackamas
- Benjamin Hayden, Polk & Tillamook
- Reuben C. Hill, Benton
- William M. Hughes, Jackson
- Joseph Jeffers, Clatsop
- Horatio Van Veighton Johnson, Washington
- William M. King, Multnomah
- T. G. Kirkpatrick, Coos & Curry
- James W. Mack, Lane
- Albert A. Matthews, Douglas
- George Rees, Clackamas
- Andrew J. Shuck, Yamhill
- James H. Slater, Benton
- Joseph G. Spear, Josephine
- Francis M. Warren, Columbia
- John Whiteaker, Lane
- Jacob Woodsides, Marion

Council (President: Hugh D. O'Bryant)

- Alexander M. Berry, Jackson & Josephine
- Thomas R. Cornelius, Washington, Multnomah, & Columbia
- Charles Drain, Linn
- Nathaniel Ford, Polk & Tillamook
- Hugh D. O'Bryant, Umpqua, Douglas & Coos
- Thomas Scott, Yamhill & Clatsop
- Edward Shiel, Marion
- Avery A. Smith, Lane & Benton
- Aaron E. Waite, Clackamas & Wasco

== 1858 ==
The 10th (and final) Oregon Territorial Legislative Session was held from December 6, 1858 to January 22, 1859. Oregon was admitted to the Union on February 14, 1859, becoming the 33rd American state.

House (Speaker: Nathaniel H. Gates)

- Benjamin F. Bonham, Marion
- Wilson Bowlby, Washington
- William W. Chapman, Lane
- James Cole, Umpqua
- Thomas J. Dryer, Multnomah
- Nathaniel H. Gates, Wasco
- Dolphes Brice Hannah, Clackamas
- Absalom F. Hedges, Clackamas
- H. N. V. Holmes, Polk & Tillamook
- Daniel S. Holton, Josephine
- Berryman Jennings, Clackamas
- William S. Jones, Lane
- James H. Lasater, Marion
- Abraham E. McGee, Douglas
- Daniel Newcomb, Jackson & Josephine
- Henry B. Nichols, Benton
- Wilder W. Parker, Clatsop
- Erasmus D. Shattuck, Washington & Multnomah
- James H. Slater, Benton
- Isaac Smith, Polk
- John H. Smith, Yamhill
- John H. Stevens, Marion
- William Riley Strong, Columbia
- William Tichenor, Coos & Curry
- William G. T'Vault, Jackson
- Stephen Watson, Jackson

Council (President: Charles Drain)

- Alexander M. Berry, Jackson & Josephine
- Thomas R. Cornelius, Multnomah, Columbia, & Washington
- Charles Drain, Linn
- Nathaniel Ford, Polk & Tillamook
- James Hendershott, Columbia & Washington
- James W. Mack, Lane & Benton
- Hugh D. O'Bryant, Umpqua, Coos, Curry, & Douglas
- Samuel Parker, Marion
- George H. Steward, Yamhill & Clatsop
- Aaron E. Waite, Clackamas & Wasco
