= William M. King =

Oregon pioneer and legislator (1800–1869)

Speaker of the Oregon Territory House of Representatives
- In office December 1, 1851 – December 5, 1852
- Preceded by: Ralph Wilcox
- Succeeded by: Benjamin F. Harding

Member of the Oregon Territory House of Representatives
- In office 1849–1851, 1857
- Constituency: Washington County (1849–1851); Multnomah County (1857)

Personal details
- Born: March 4, 1800 Danbury, Connecticut, US
- Died: November 8, 1869 (aged 69) Portland, Oregon, US
- Party: Democrat; Whig
- Spouse: Mary Hadley
- Profession: Merchant

William Myron King, also known as Colonel King for most of his life, (March 4, 1800 – November 8, 1869) was an American pioneer merchant and Oregon state legislator. He served four terms in Oregon's territorial legislature. This included one term as Speaker of the Oregon House of Representatives during the 1851 legislative session. Before immigrating to Oregon, King lived and worked in New York, Pennsylvania, Ohio, and Missouri. After moving to Oregon in 1848, he became a merchant in Portland, and was later the county judge for Multnomah County and a member of Portland's city council.

== Early life ==
King was born in Danbury, Connecticut, on March 4, 1800. His family was of English and Welsh heritage. As a young man, he married Mary Hadley of Middlebury, Vermont. Together they had one son and six daughters. Little else is known about his life until the early 1830s.

By 1832, King was a partner in the firm of King and Hammon. He and his partner, Hiram Hammon, performed contract work on the Pennsylvania extension of the Erie Canal and the Chenango Canal. Between 1834 and 1836, the firm operated out of Rutland, New York, selling lime and plaster to local builders. In 1837, King joined with two new partners to buy a sawmill in DeWitt, New York. During that period, he also produced and sold cement for building construction projects.

In 1835, King was appointed a major in the 176th Infantry, a New York militia unit. Two years later on June 24, 1839, he was appointed colonel of the 170th Infantry Regiment. From that time on, he was commonly known as Colonel King.

In 1839, he bought into another mill in Conneaut, Ohio. Then in 1842, he moved his family west and purchased land in Palmyra, Missouri.

== Oregon pioneer ==
In 1848, King once again moved his family west. This time across the country to the Oregon Territory. He settled in Portland, where he became active in business and civic affairs.

Shortly after arriving in Portland, King built the area's first sawmill. However, it was destroyed in a fire soon after it began producing lumber. King also built a wood-frame commercial structure on the corner of First and Oak streets in downtown Portland. Beginning in 1849, the Reverend Horace Lyman used the building as a schoolhouse. In 1850, King and other community leaders including Reverend Lyman and Josiah Failing attempted to create a public school district in Portland. However, they were unsuccessful due to local opposition and the difficulty in establishing a new taxing district under existing territorial law.

In 1850, President Zachary Taylor appointed King to the position of Surveyor and Inspector of Revenue for the Port of Portland. He held that position until 1852, when he was replaced by Thomas J. Dryer. Between 1850 and 1855, King was involved in several business ventures. First, he was in a mercantile partnership with J. B. V. Butler; then, later with George Kittredge. For several years, King and Kittredge sold general supplies to both retail and wholesale customers. During that period, King was also a member of the Portland and Valley Improvement Company. In addition, he served as president of the Portland and Valley Plank Road Company.

== State legislator ==
In 1849, King decided to run for a seat in Oregon's territorial House of Representatives, representing the Portland area. He was elected and took his seat in the Oregon House on July 16, 1849. This was the Oregon Territory's first legislative session. He served through the 1849 session which ended on September 29. During the session, the legislature charged the names of several counties; Champoeg County was changed to Marion County, Tualatin County was changed to Washington County, and Vancouver County was changed to Clarke County (now part of Washington state).

King ran for re-election in 1850 as a Democrat. By then, Portland had become part of Washington County which had two seats in the territorial House of Representatives. There were three candidates competing for the country's two seats, King, Ralph Wilcox of Hillsborough, and James M. Moore of Linn City. King and Wilcox won the two seats in the 1850 election.

The 1850 legislative session began on December 2, 1850. King served through the session which ended on February 8, 1851. This was the last legislative session held in Oregon City. During the session, the legislature designated Salem as the territory's new seat of government. It also created several new geographic jurisdictions including Pacific County on the north side of the Columbia River (now part of Washington state) and Umpqua Country which later became Douglas and Coos counties.

In 1851, King ran for a third term in the Oregon territorial legislature, representing Washington County. In the 1851 election, Washington County had three seats in the House of Representatives. Seven candidates competed for the three seats. King won one of Washington County's seats, along with Ralph Wilcox and Zebulon C. Bishop.

King took his seat in the Oregon House on December 1, 1851. When the session was organized, King was elected Speaker of the House. The 1851 session was the first legislative session held in Salem. Three members of the House refused to travel to Salem, gathering instead in Oregon City. As a result, they played no part in the 1851 legislative session. On January 9, 1852, Judge Orville C. Pratt, associate justice of the territorial supreme court, read the court's decision confirming the legislature's action that established Salem as the Oregon Territory's seat of government. King led the 1851 legislative session until the assembly adjourned on January 21, 1852.

In 1852, the Washington County Democratic convention nominated King for another term in the territorial House of Representatives. The convention also nominated Doctor D. H. Belknap of Plains and John Bonsor of Sauvie's Island to compete for the three Washington County seats in the House. However, all three lost to Whig Party candidates.

After leaving the legislature, King remained engaged in government affairs. The 1852 legislature appointed King, Samuel Parker, and Shubrick Norris to an ad hoc board of commissioners tasked with finding a location for a territorial penitentiary and overseeing construction of the facility. King and Kittredge sold construction supplies to the firm that built the prison. After the penitentiary was built, King and Kittredge sold general supplies to the company that operated the prison. Because of King's overlapping political connections and business interests, he and other prominent Democrats were caricatured in a series of political satire articles written by William L. Adams. The satires were published in The Oregonian newspaper in 1852 under the title Treason, Stratagems, and Spoils.

In 1853, King served as chairman of Washington County's Democratic convention. That same year, the federal customs and surveyor position at the Port of Portland was separated into two appointed positions. President Franklin Pierce appointed King to the surveyor of customs position. He remained in that position until 1856.

Sometime between 1856 and 1857, King left the Democratic Party and joined the Whig Party. In 1857, he decided to run for another term in the Oregon Territory's House of Representatives. By that time, Portland was part of Multnomah County, which had been created in 1954 from parts of Washington and Clackamas counties. King won Multnomah County's seat in the legislature. The session began on December 7, 1857, and lasted through February 5, 1958. When the House was organized, King was a candidate for speaker. He was defeated for that position by Ira F. M. Butler, a Polk County representative. In the election for speaker Butler received 16 votes while King received only 8 with both King and Butler voting for Nathaniel H. Gates of Wasco County. When the session began, Governor George L. Curry addressed the legislature highlighting the growth of the Oregon Territory and pointing out the changes which would happen when Oregon achieved statehood. During the session, the legislature elected territorial officers and conducted other required business before adjourning on February 5, 1858. This turned out to be the last meeting of the House of Representative before Oregon achieved statehood in 1859.

== Later life ==
After completing his fourth term in the House of Representative, King returned to his business in Portland, but he remained active in local politics. By 1858, King had rejoined the Democratic Party. At that time, Oregon's Democratic Party was bitterly divided between two factions, the traditional Democrats (known as Hard Democrats or the Salem Clique) led by Asahel Bush and supporters of Joseph Lane (known as Soft or National Democrats). In 1858, Multnomah County held a convention of National Democrats that nominated King for two positions, county judge and probate judge. He was elected Multnomah County judge in the 1858 election, but lost the race for probate judge by 75 votes. A year later, he was elected to the Portland city council. King was re-elected to the city council two years later.

King lived and worked in Portland for the rest of his life. He served on the Portland Public Schools board from 1863 to 1864. He was eventually forced to retire due to ill health. He died at his home in Portland on November 8, 1869, at the age of 69. He was survived by his wife and six of their children. King was buried at Lone Fir Cemetery in Portland.
