= Levi Scott (Oregon politician) =

American politician

Oregon Territory Council
- In office 1852–1855
- Constituency: Umpqua County, Douglas County & Jackson County counties

Delegate to the Oregon Constitutional Convention
- In office 1857
- Constituency: Umpqua County

Personal details
- Born: February 8, 1797 Monroe County, Illinois
- Died: April 21, 1890 (aged 93) Malheur County, Oregon
- Party: Whig

Levi Scott (1797–1890) was a politician in the Oregon Territory of the United States in the 1850s. A native of Illinois, he was a captain during the Cayuse War, helped lay the Applegate Trail, served in the Oregon Territorial Legislature, and in 1857 was a member of the Oregon Constitutional Convention. Scott also founded Scottsburg, Oregon, and is the namesake of several natural features in Southern Oregon.

== Early life ==
Levi Scott was born on February 8, 1797, in what would become the state of Illinois. He was married and had two children, and by 1844, he had moved to Iowa and was living in Burlington. In May 1844, Levi and his son John Scott (b. 1828) immigrated to what was then Oregon Country and settled near Dallas, Oregon.

== Political career ==
In 1846, Scott, along with his son, as well as Jesse Applegate, Lindsay Applegate, and others, set off to create a southern route into the Willamette Valley. The route authorized by the Provisional Government of Oregon would travel southwest from Fort Hall and cross the Rogue Valley and Umpqua Valley before turning north to the Willamette Valley settlements. This Southern Route has become known as the Applegate Trail.

During the Cayuse War, Scott was made a captain and was responsible for sending dispatches for the Provisional Government south to California. Following his involvement in the war, he settled in 1848 along Elm Creek in Douglas County, Oregon, with the valley named Scotts Valley in his honor. In 1850, Scott founded Scottsburg, Oregon, along the Umpqua River.

Scott then entered the political field when he was elected to the Oregon Territorial Legislature in 1852. He represented three southern counties, Umpqua, Douglas, and Jackson as a Whig in the upper chamber Council. Scott won re-election twice, serving through the 1854-55 session. He returned to politics briefly in 1857 as a delegate to the Oregon Constitutional Convention. Scott represented Umpqua County as an Anti-Democrat.

== Later life and legacy ==
He died in Malheur County, Oregon, in the Southeastern part of the state on April 21, 1890. In addition to the town, valley, and mountains named after him, including Scott Mountain in Douglas County and, in 1946, Mount Scott, the highest peak in Crater Lake National Park within Southern Oregon..
