= Keady (disambiguation) =

Keady is a village in County Armagh, Northern Ireland.

Keady may also refer to:

== Places ==
Canada

- Keady, Ontario

United Kingdom

- Keady, County Fermanagh, a townland in County Fermanagh, Northern Ireland
- Keady, County Londonderry, a townland in County Londonderry, Northern Ireland
- Keady, County Tyrone, a townland in County Tyrone, Northern Ireland

== Other uses ==
- Keady Lámh Dhearg Hurling Club, in the County Armagh village
- Keady Michael Dwyer's GFC, Gaelic football club in the County Armagh village
- Keady railway station, in the County Armagh village
- Keady (surname), with a list of people of this name
