= Zebulon C. Bishop =

American politician (1815–1864)

Speaker of the Oregon Territory House of Representatives
- In office 5 December 1853 – 2 February 1854
- Preceded by: Benjamin F. Harding
- Succeeded by: Lafayette Cartee

Member of the Oregon Territory House of Representatives
- In office 1851–1852; 1853–1854
- Constituency: Washington County

Personal details
- Born: 1815 Philadelphia, Pennsylvania
- Died: 21 August 1864 (aged 48–49) Cleveland, Ohio
- Party: Democratic
- Spouses: Mary Ann Alexander (m. 1844; died 1846); Sallie J. Hendrick (m. 1860)

Zebulon Comstock Bishop (1815–1864) was an American politician and traveler who served in the Oregon Territorial Legislature as a member of the House of Representatives. He was Speaker of the Oregon House during the 1853 legislative session. After leaving Oregon, Bishop traveled around Asia, eventually returning to the United States.

== Early life ==
Bishop was born in 1815 in Philadelphia, Pennsylvania. He was the son of Joshua and Martha Bishop.

In 1839, Bishop relocated to Missouri, following his brother Thomas who had moved to Warsaw in Benton County in 1832. By the time Zebulon arrived his brother was operating a frontier store and had been elected county recorder. In Warsaw, Bishop was well liked and worked as a tailor before being elected clerk of the local court. Bishop married Mary Ann Alexander on 24 August 1844. Mary was the daughter of Judge George Alexander, a leader in the Benton County community. Together they had one son, George Thomas. His wife Mary died on 12 November 1846.

When the Mexican–American War began in 1846, Bishop volunteered to serve in the United States Army. He was commissioned as a captain in the quartermaster corps. He served through the war years and was discharged from the army in October 1848. He served in Company D of the 4th Regiment of Kentucky Foot Volunteers.

== Oregon Territory ==
In 1850, Bishop left Missouri for the Pacific Northwest, leaving his son with his wife's parents. He first traveled to the Puget Sound area and then onto Oregon, settling on the south bank of the Columbia River in the community of St. Helens in Washington County.

The following year, Bishop was elected to the Oregon Territorial Legislature, representing Washington County in the House of Representatives. He was one of the three Washington County representatives, all Democrats. The other two representatives were Ralph Wilcox and William M. King, who was Speaker of the House that session. The 1851 session was opened on 1 December 1851 and adjourned on 21 January 1852. During the session, Bishop served on the military affairs, commerce, enrolled bills, and printing committees. As a member of the military affairs committee, Bishop brought a bill to the floor that ask the United States Congress to establish army posts in the Rouge River Valley.

Bishop and the other two Washington County Democrats lost their seats to three Whig Party candidates in the 1852 election.

In 1853, the Washington County Democratic convention nominated Bishop, Robert Thompson, and Charles P. Culver as its candidates for the three House seats representing the county. Bishop and Thompson won seats along with a Whig Party candidate, A. A. Durham. When the House was organized on 5 December, Bishop was elected Speaker. During the session, the legislature adopted a memorial asking the Federal Government to expedite payment to militiamen who had fought in the Rouge River Indian Wars and to pay claims of merchants who furnished supplies to the Army during that conflict. The session adjourned on 2 February 1854. In the next legislative session, Bishop was succeeded as Speaker of the Oregon Territory's House by Lafayette Cartee.

== Travel and later life ==
Either in late 1854 or early 1855, Bishop took a steamship to Formosa and then traveled to Hong Kong. While in Hong Kong, he was profitably employed and lived in a nice home with enough servants to live well.

He returned to the United States in 1856. After arriving, Bishop wrote to his brother in Missouri from Stockton, California. In California, he worked as a miner in the Sierra Nevada mountains and then as a ranch hand before returning to Missouri. By 1860, Bishop was living in St. Louis. Around that time, his son was killed in an accident while attending school in St. Louis. Bishop married Sallie J. Hendrick on 5 September 1860 in Cleveland, Ohio.

On 27 August 1861, Bishop was attacked on a street in St Louis. He was clubbed on the head with a cane by a drunk man Bishop had an on-going disagreement with. The attacker was found guilty in court and fined $53 for disturbing the peace.

Bishop died on 21 August 1864 in Cleveland, Ohio.

== Personal records ==
Today, a collection of his papers is held by the Oregon Historical Society Research Library in Portland, Oregon. The collection includes typed transcripts of letters Bishop wrote to his brother Thomas, other family members, and friends in Missouri. Most of the letters were written from locations in the Oregon Territory. However, there is also one letter from Stockton, California and one Bishop sent from Hong Kong. The topics covered in his letters include the 1851 territorial legislature session and the disagreement between the legislature and the governor regarding the location of Oregon's capital. Several of the letters were published in the June 1965 edition of the Oregon Historical Quarterly.
