= List of speakers of the Oregon House of Representatives =

This is a complete list of people who have served as speakers of the Oregon House of Representatives through the most recent session. Oregon became a state on February 14, 1859, with prior sessions of the House organized under the territorial government and the provisional government. Prior to the adoption of the second set of Organic Laws in 1845, the legislative body of the provisional government was the legislative committee, and leaders of that body are not listed below.

As of 2024 and the end of the 82nd Oregon Legislative Assembly, Julie Fahey is serving as the current speaker.

== Before statehood ==
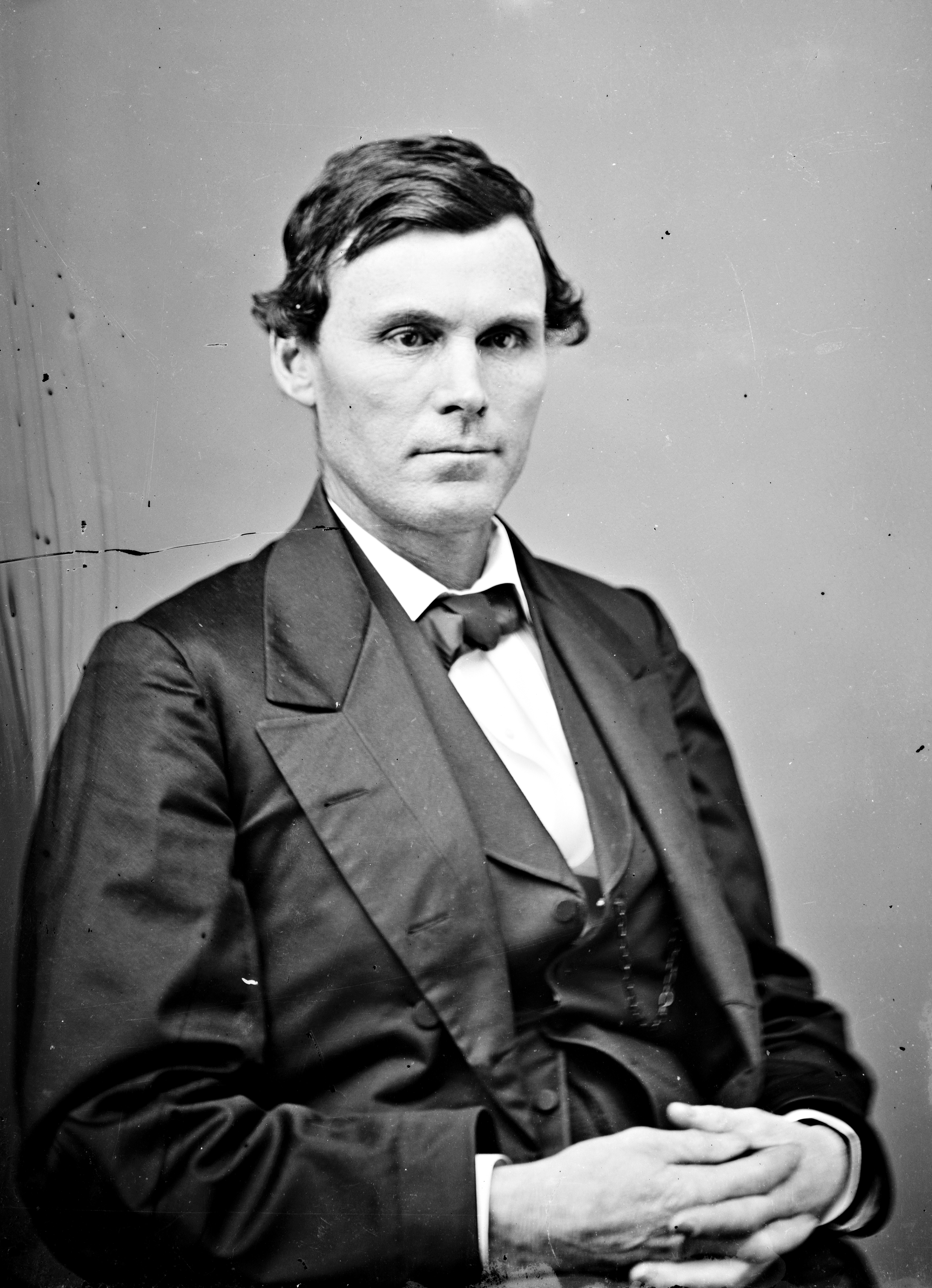
Benjamin F. Harding

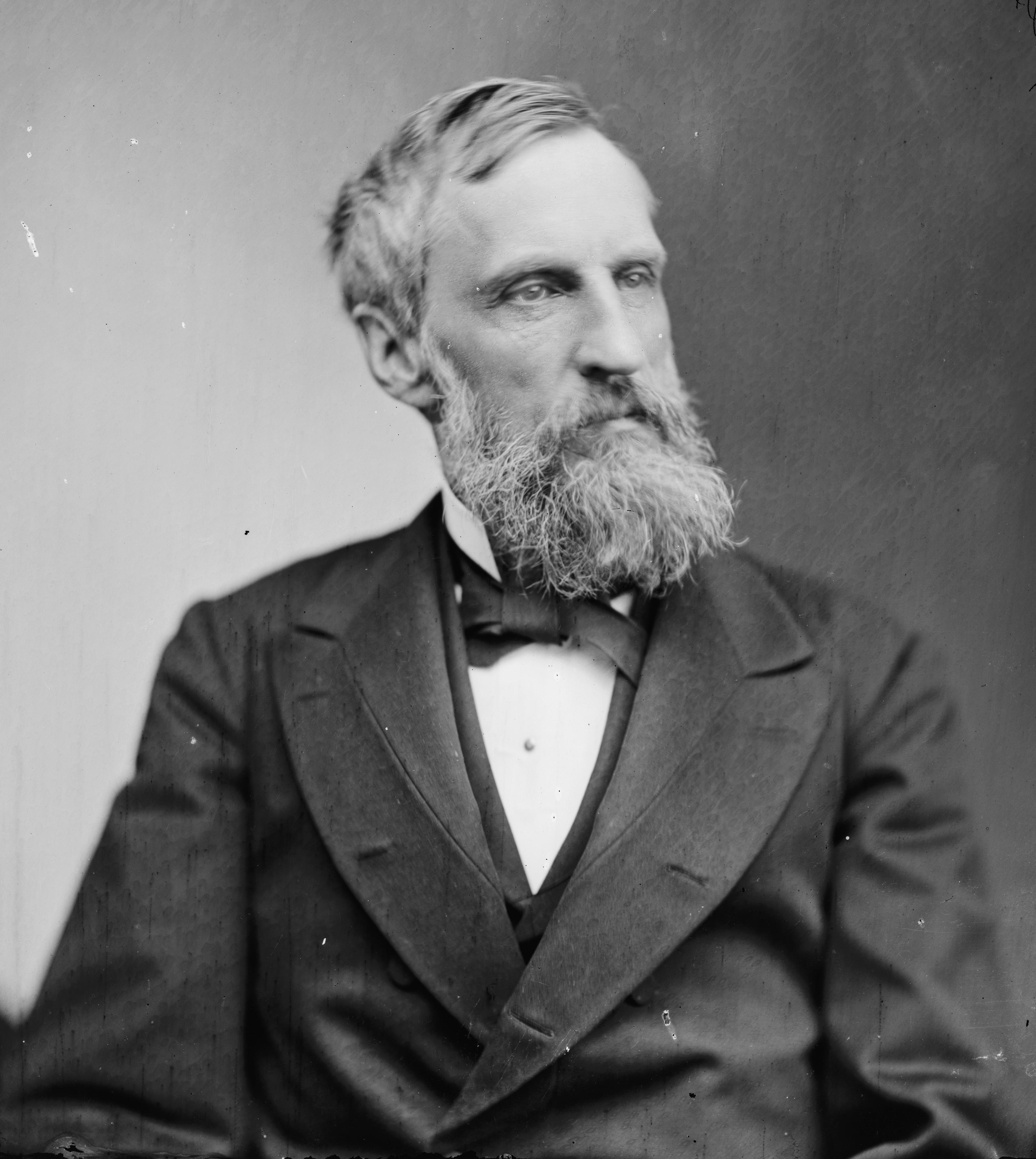
La Fayette Grover

| Session | Type | Name | District/County represented | Political party |
|---|---|---|---|---|
| 1845 | Provisional Legislature | Morton M. McCarver | Tuality | |
| 1845 | Provisional Legislature | Robert Newell; H. A. G. Lee | Champoeg; Clackamas | |
| 1846 | Provisional Legislature | Asa Lovejoy | Clackamas | |
| 1847 | Provisional Legislature | Robert Newell | Champoeg | |
| 1848-1849 | Provisional Legislature | Ralph Wilcox; Levi A. Rice | Tuality; Yamhill | |
| 1849 | Territorial Legislature | Asa Lovejoy | Clackamas | |
| 1850 | Territorial Legislature | Ralph Wilcox | Washington | |
| 1851 | Territorial Legislature | William M. King | Washington | |
| 1852 | Territorial Legislature | Benjamin F. Harding | Marion | Democratic |
| 1853 | Territorial Legislature | Zebulon C. Bishop | Washington | Democratic |
| 1854 | Territorial Legislature | Lafayette Cartee | Clackamas | Democratic |
| 1855 | Territorial Legislature | Delazon Smith | Linn | Democratic |
| 1856 | Territorial Legislature | La Fayette Grover | Marion | Democratic |
| 1857 | Territorial Legislature | Ira F. M. Butler | Polk | Democratic |
| 1858 | Territorial Legislature | Nathaniel H. Gates | Wasco | Democratic |

== After statehood ==
| No. | Portrait | Name District | Session | Party |
|---|---|---|---|---|
| 1 | | William G. T'Vault Jackson County | 1859 Sp. | Democratic |
| 2 | | Benjamin F. Harding Marion County | 1860 | Democratic |
| 3 | | Joel Palmer Yamhill County | 1862 | Republican |
| 4 | | Isaac R. Moores Jr. Marion County | 1864 1865 | Republican |
| 5 | | Francis A. Chenoweth Benton County | 1866 | Republican |
| 6 | | John Whiteaker Lane County | 1868 | Democratic |
| 7 | | Benjamin Hayden Polk County | 1870 | Democratic |
| 8 | | Rufus Mallory Marion County | 1872 | Republican |
| 9 | | John C. Drain Douglas County | 1874 | Democratic |
| 10 | | James K. Weatherford Linn County | 1876 | Democratic |
| 11 | | John M. Thompson Lane County | 1878 | Democratic |
| 12 | | Zenas Ferry Moody Wasco County | 1880 | Republican |
| 13 | | George W. McBride Columbia County | 1882 | Republican |
| 14 | | W. P. Keady (1st term) Benton County | 1885 | Republican |
| 15 | | J. T. Gregg Marion County | 1887 | Republican |
| 16 | | E. L. Smith Hood River County | 1889 | Republican |
| 17 | | Theodore Thurston Geer Marion County | 1891 | Republican |
| 14 | | W. P. Keady (2nd term) Multnomah County | 1893 | Republican |
| 18 | | Charles B. Moores Marion County | 1895 | Republican |
| 19 | | E. V. Carter Jackson County | 1898 Sp. 1899 | Republican |
| 20 | | Levi Branson Reeder Umatilla County | 1901 | Republican |
| 21 | | Lawrence T. Harris Lane County | 1903 | Republican |
| 22 | | A. L. Mills Multnomah County | 1905 | Republican |
| 23 | | Frank Davey Marion County | 1907 | Republican |
| 24 | | Clifton N. McArthur (1st term) Multnomah County | 1909 1909 Sp. | Republican |
| 25 | | John P. Rusk Wallowa County | 1911 | Republican |
| 24 | | Clifton N. McArthur (2nd term) Multnomah County | 1913 | Republican |
| 26 | | Ben Selling Multnomah County | 1915 | Republican |
| 27 | | Robert N. Stanfield Umatilla County | 1917 | Republican |
| 28 | | Seymour Jones Marion County | 1919 1920 | Republican |
| 29 | | Louis E. Bean Lane County | 1921 1921 Sp. | Republican |
| 30 | | Kaspar K. Kubli Multnomah County | 1923 | Republican |
| 31 | | Denton G. Burdick Deschutes County | 1925 | Republican |
| 32 | | John H. Carkin Jackson County | 1927 | Republican |
| 33 | | R. S. Hamilton Deschutes County | 1929 | Republican |
| 34 | | Frank J. Lonergan Multnomah County | 1931 | Republican |
| 35 | | Earl Snell Gilliam County | 1933 1933 Sp. | Republican |
| 36 | | John E. Cooter Lincoln County | 1935 | Democratic |
| 37 | | Howard Latourette Multnomah County | 1935 Sp. | Democratic |
| 38 | | Harry D. Boivin Klamath County | 1937 | Democratic |
| 39 | | Ernest R. Fatland Gilliam County | 1939 | Republican |
| 40 | | Robert S. Farrell Jr. Multnomah County | 1941 | Republican |
| 41 | | William M. McAllister Jackson County | 1943 | Republican |
| 42 | | Eugene E. Marsh Yamhill County | 1945 | Republican |
| 43 | | John Hubert Hall Multnomah County | 1947 | Republican |
| 44 | | Frank J. Van Dyke Jackson County | 1949 | Republican |
| 45 | | John F. Steelhammer Marion County | 1951 | Republican |
| 46 | | Rudie Wilhelm, Jr. Multnomah County | 1953 | Republican |
| 47 | | Edward A. Geary Klamath County | 1955 | Republican |
| 48 | | Pat Dooley Multnomah County | 1957 1957 Sp. | Democratic |
| 49 | | Robert B. Duncan Jackson County | 1959 1961 | Democratic |
| 50 | | Clarence Barton Coos County | 1963 1963 Sp. | Democratic |
| 51 | | Monte Montgomery Lane County | 1965 1965 Sp. 1967 1967 Sp. | Republican |
| 52 | | Bob Smith Harney County | 1969 1971 1971 Sp. | Republican |
| 53 | | Richard O. Eymann Lane County | 1973 1974 | Democratic |
| 54 | | Phil Lang 10 - Portland | 1975 1977 1978 Sp. | Democratic |
| 55 | | Hardy Myers 19 - Portland | 1979 1980 Sp. 1981 1981 Sp. | Democratic |
| 56 | | Grattan Kerans Lane County | 1983 1983 Sp. | Democratic |
| 57 | | Vera Katz 8 - Portland | 1985 1987 1989 1989 Sp. | Democratic |
| 58 | | Larry Campbell 43 - Eugene | 1991 1993 | Republican |
| 59 | | Bev Clarno 55 - Bend | 1995 1995 Sp. | Republican |
| 60 | | Lynn Lundquist 59 - Powell Butte | 1997 | Republican |
| 61 | | Lynn Snodgrass 10 - Boring | 1999 1999 Sp. | Republican |
| 62 | | Mark Simmons 58 - Elgin | 2001 2001 Sp. | Republican |
| 63 | | Karen Minnis 49 - Fairview | 2003 2005 | Republican |
| 64 | | Jeff Merkley 49 - Portland (Mill Park) | 2007 | Democratic |
| 65 | | Dave Hunt 40 - Gladstone | 2009 | Democratic |
| 66 | | Arnie Roblan (Co-speaker) 9 - Coos Bay | 2011 | Democratic |
| 66 | | Bruce Hanna (Co-speaker) 7 - Roseburg | 2011 | Republican |
| 67 | | Tina Kotek 49 - Portland (Kenton) | 2013 2015 2017 2019 2021 | Democratic |
| 68 | | Dan Rayfield 16 - Corvallis | 2022 Sp. 2023 | Democratic |
| 69 | | Julie Fahey 14 - Eugene | 2025 | Democratic |

== See also ==
- List of presidents of the Oregon State Senate
- List of Oregon Legislative Assemblies
