= Ralph Wilcox =

Ralph Wilcox may refer to:

- Ralph Wilcox (politician)
- Ralph Wilcox (actor)
