= Driftwood Room =

Bar and restaurant in Portland, Oregon, U.S.

- Interactive map of Driftwood Room

Restaurant information
- Location: Portland, Multnomah, Oregon, United States
- Coordinates: 45.52098°N 122.68769°W

The Driftwood Room is a bar and restaurant in Portland, Oregon's Hotel deLuxe, in the United States.

== Description ==
In 2012, Portland Monthly's Brandy Crowe said the bar "remains a heavily trafficked destination for cool kids and fans of mixology alike. The lounge retains its original plush and charm with very little retouching since being installed in the mid-1950s when it was still the Hotel Mallory." Jay Horton of Willamette Week wrote in 2016, "Once a withering lounge attached to a de facto extended care facility whose name described furnishings and patrons alike, the Driftwood Room has been reborn as a windowless jewel box of luxe tippling that lures a cosmopolitan array of visiting guests, West Hills dowagers, and genteel bohemians sniffing happy-hour bargains like half-price Champagne cocktails, in one of the few bars in Portland that has bothered to make such things into a house specialty alongside flights of Manhattans. Imagine ... a world of tiny Manhattans in dim light."

Condé Nast Traveler's Jen Stevenson described Driftwood as "a small, sultry, retro hole-in-the-wall bar, local legend, and destination all its own". Fodor's says, "Once your eyes adjust to the romantically dim lighting, you'll find a curved bar, leather banquette seating, and polished-wood ceilings and walls in this retro-chic bar in the Old Hollywood–themed Hotel deLuxe. The trendy cocktails are garnished with herbs culled from the hotel's garden. The happy-hour food menu is one of the best in the city." Time has described the bar as "one of Portland's iconic lounges" and a "dark, wood-paneled" space where "local deal-makers hobnob in cushy leather banquettes". According to Travel + Leisure, "The space has cushioned banquette seating, alligator skin and shark skin railing, moody wall sconces, and the namesake driftwood affixed to a purple back bar".

== History ==
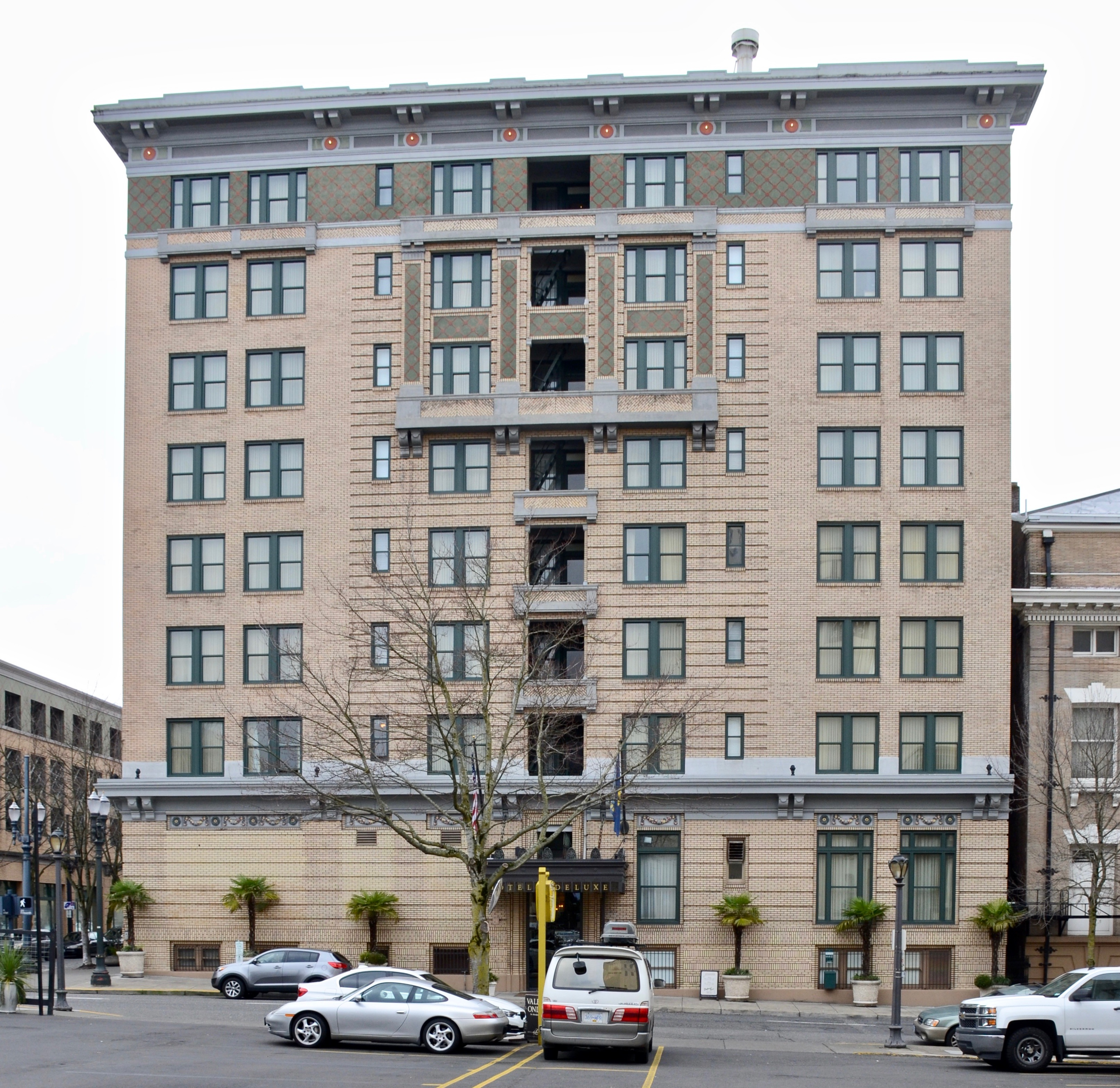
The bar is housed in the Hotel deLuxe (pictured in 2018)

Steven Sirok oversaw the cocktail menu, as of 2016. In 2019, the bar expanded its absinthe options, offering seven varieties of the spirit as well as multiple absinthe cocktails.

== Reception ==
In 2014, Michael Russell included Driftwood in The Oregonian lists of the top ten "classic" Portland bars and the city's 100 best bars overall. The newspaper's Grant Butler included Driftwood in a 2018 list of "30 great Portland bars that are still going strong". In 2019, the Portland Mercury's Megan Burbank wrote, "The Driftwood Room at the Hotel deLuxe isn't cheap, but it's one of the comfiest, loveliest places in town to drink, and the happy hour menu's heavy on full-fat delights and fizzy champagne cocktails." Ryan Smith included Driftwood in Architectural Digest's 2019 list of "The 20 Best-Designed Hotel Bars in the U.S.", writing, "The retro vibe of the Driftwood Room at the Hotel Deluxe in Portland is played up with cocktails named after Hollywood legends like Elizabeth Taylor."
