= Lafayette Cartee =

American pioneer surveyor and civil engineer

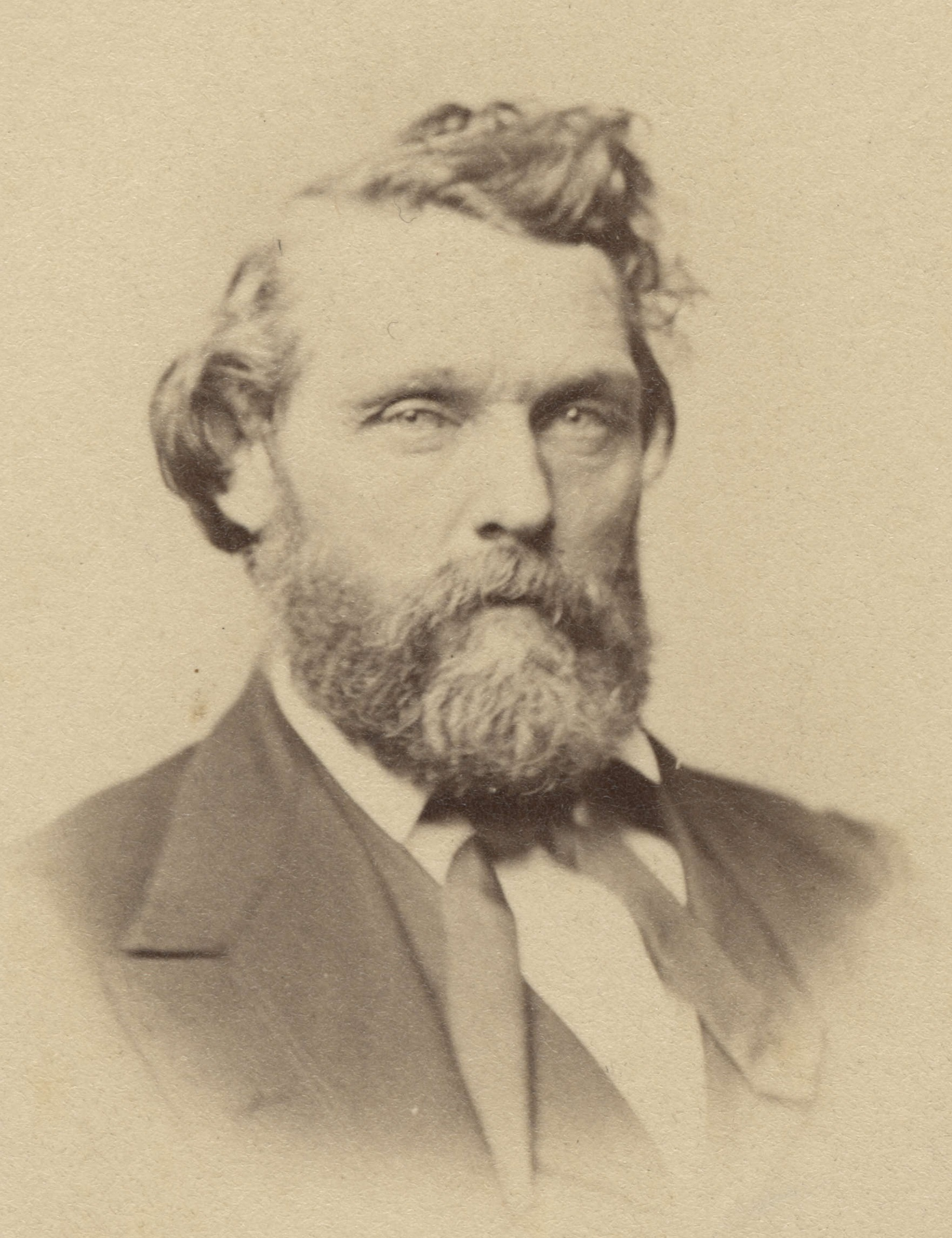

Speaker of the Oregon Territory House of Representatives
- In office December 4, 1854 – December 1, 1855
- Preceded by: Zebulon C. Bishop
- Succeeded by: Delazon Smith

Member of the Oregon Territory House of Representatives
- In office 1853–1855
- Constituency: Clackamas County, Oregon

Personal details
- Born: December 2, 1823 Syracuse, New York, U.S.
- Died: September 2, 1891 (aged 67) Boise, Idaho, U.S.
- Party: Democrat; later Republican
- Spouse: Mary S. Bell (died 1862)
- Profession: Surveyor, civil engineer

Lafayette F. Cartee (December 2, 1823 – September 2, 1891) was an American pioneer surveyor and civil engineer who conducted the initial surveys of many areas of Oregon, Washington, and Idaho. He was also an Oregon state legislator, served two terms in Oregon's territorial legislature. This included one term as Speaker of the Oregon House of Representatives during the 1854 legislative session. He was later appointed surveyor general of the Idaho Territory, a position he held for 14 years. While in Idaho he became an expert horticulturist, developing the territories first commercial plant nursery. He also built the territory's first greenhouse and its first fruit and vegetable cannery.

== Early life ==
Cartee was born in Syracuse, New York on December 2, 1823. He was the son of John L. Cartee and Seclendia (Cartier) Cartee. In 1825, he moved with his family to Coudersport, Pennsylvania, where he resided until 1844. When he was growing up, there were no schools nearby, so he was mostly self-educated at home.

He left Pennsylvania in 1844 and took a job as a high school principal in Newport, Kentucky. He held that position for two years before moving to Cincinnati, Ohio in 1846. In Cincinnati, he was hired as a professor of mathematics and civil engineering at St John's College. However, ill health forced him to resign from that position after two years.

To restore his health, Cartee's doctor recommended a long sea voyage. So, in 1848, he booked passage on a sailing ship headed for San Francisco, California. After sailing around South America, he arrived in San Francisco in June 1849 with his health greatly improved. After spending several months in California, he moved to the Oregon Territory, settling in Oregon City.

== Oregon Territory ==
After Cartee arrived in Oregon City, he opened a surveying and engineering business. The early 1850s were a good time to be a surveyor in Oregon since settlers attempting to secure property rights under the new Donation Land Claim Act needed their land accurately surveyed in order to file their claims. In addition, as a well-educated professional, Cartee quickly became a respected member of the Oregon City community, which was the seat of government for the Oregon Territory at that time.

In 1853, Cartee was elected as a delegate to the Oregon Territory's Democratic convention, representing Clackamas County. He served on the resolutions committee during the convention. Following the territorial convention, Cartee attended the Clackamas County Democratic convention, where he was selected as one of three Democratic nominees for a Clackamas County seat in Oregon's territorial House of Representatives. The other two Democratic nominees were F. C. Cason and B. B. Jackson.

Cartee and his two fellow Democrats were elected to the three Clackamas County seats in the Oregon House of Representatives. He took his seat in the Oregon House on December 5, 1853. He served through the 1853 session which ended on February 2, 1854. During the session, Cartee was appointed to the joint code committee, responsible for proposing new public laws.

Cartee ran for re-election in 1854. Once again, the Clackamas County's Democratic convention selected him as one of three candidates nominated to run for an Oregon House seat representing the county. The other two Democratic nominees were William A. Starkweather and J. Guthrie. Cartee and Starkweather won seats, but the third Clackamas County seat was won to Asa Lovejoy, a Whig Party candidate. When the House was organized, Cartee was elected Speaker of the House. He served as speaker through the 1854 session, which ended on February 1, 1855. During the session, the legislature created Wasco County which at that time included all of Eastern Oregon. The legislature also combined eastern Washington County and a northern section of Clackamas County to create Multnomah County. A bill was introduced that would have asked Oregon voters to approve holding a convention to draft a constitution, a mandatory first step in the process of seeking statehood. However, that bill did not pass.

Between legislature sessions, Cartee continued his survey work. In 1854, he was awarded a government contract to survey from Camas, Washington south to Estacada, Oregon. During that time, he trained several assistant surveyors including David P. Thompson, who was later appointed governor of the Idaho Territory.

After leaving the legislature in 1855, Cartee traveled back to Pennsylvania where he married Mary S. Bell. The newlyweds return to Oregon together and built a large brick house in Oregon City. Over the next few years, they had four children, a son and three daughters.

After Cartee returned from Pennsylvania, he surveyed government lands east of the Cascade Mountains near Hood River, Hermiston, and Maupin. In 1859, he spent a short time serving as the chief clerk for Oregon's surveyor general, William Chapman. The following year, he was awarded a government contract to survey parts of the Deschutes River basin. When that contract was completed, the scope was extended to cover an additional 300 miles of line. In 1861, he prepared the first city plat map of The Dalles. The map became an official part of the city record when it was approved by the city council later that year.

Sometime after leaving the legislature, Cartee quit the Democratic Party and joined the newly formed Republican Party. During the American Civil War, he was a strong and active supporter of the Union cause, encouraging Oregon voters to support pro-Union candidates regardless of their party affiliation.

In 1862, he was hired by the Oregon Steam Navigation Company as chief engineer responsible for constructing a 14-mile portage railroad along the south shore of the Columbia River. The railroad was necessary to bypassing the river's unnavigable rapids between Celilo Falls and The Dalles. This short line was the first railroad built in Oregon. His wife, Mary, died in The Dalles in 1862 while Cartee was away from home working on the railroad. Cartee never remarried. In 1863, he moved with his children to Boise City in the Idaho Territory. When his son was fourteen-years-old, Cartee sent him to The Dalles to recover Mary's body and transport it to Boise for re-burial.

== Idaho Territory ==
Cartee lived and worked in Boise for the rest of his life. In Idaho, he continued his successful surveying career and became well known for his horticultural expertise. His Boise home eventually became city landmark, noted for its fruit trees and beautiful flower garden. West Shore magazine published a lithograph picture of his home in its October 1878 edition.

In 1866, President Andrew Johnson appointed Cartee surveyor general of Idaho, a position he held for the next 14 years. He was the first person to hold that position. His survey work was important because government land in the Idaho Territory could not be made available for homesteading until it was surveyed. Cartee got started in April 1867 when he chose the initial point to begin surveying the territory. Idaho's initial point is the place where the Boise meridian intersects the Idaho survey baseline.

At the same time, he was overseeing the territorial survey, Cartee was expanding his knowledge of horticulture and developing his 24-acres garden into a commercial nursery. His nursery was located along the Boise River in a very nice part of the city. In 1871, he built the territory's first greenhouse on his nursery property in Boise.

For the next two decades, Cartee imported trees, shrubs, and flowers from the eastern United States. This was a challenge, since the plants had to be shipped by railroad to a station in Utah and then hauled by freight wagon 232 miles from the railhead to Boise. He also imported plants from China, Japan, and India which had to travel to North America by sea before beginning their rail journey. He imported cherry, plum, mulberry, quince, and orange trees. He also imported ornamental fir trees, Norway spruce, sugar maple, black walnut, and box elders. In addition, be brought new flowers to Boise including magnolias and lilacs. In 1878, he opened a fruit and vegetable cannery. Eventually, his cannery produced 30,000 cans a year. Between 1870 and 1890, plants from Cartee's nursery played an important role in making Boise a beautiful city.

Cartee continued to be in demand as a supervising engineer into his later years. In 1890, Cartee was hired to oversee the construction for a new cell block at Idaho's territorial prison. In early 1891, he built a drug store in downtown Boise.

== Personal life ==
Cartee was an active Mason for many years. He served as secretary of the Grand Lodge of Idaho in 1871, 1872, 1879, and 1880. He was deputy grand master in 1881 and then grand master in 1882. He was a member of Ada County's horticultural society, serving as president of that organization in 1872. He was a member of the Idaho Grange, serving as state deputy for Boise City in the mid-1870s. He was also a member of the Idaho Livestock Association and served on its executive committee. In addition, Cartee was chairman of the Idaho Territorial Republican Central Committee in the 1870s.

In the summer of 1891, Cartee fell ill. He died at his home in Boise on September 2 of that year at the age of 67. He was survived by his four children. He was so well respected in the community that all the businesses in Boise closed on the day of his funeral. Cartee was buried next to his wife in the Pioneer Cemetery of Boise.

Today, Cartee's papers and memorabilia are in the Idaho State Historical Society collection held in the Idaho State Archives. The Cartee papers includes personal letters, financial records from his nursery business, and various legal documents including his will.
