= Benjamin Hayden =

American politician (1822–1908)

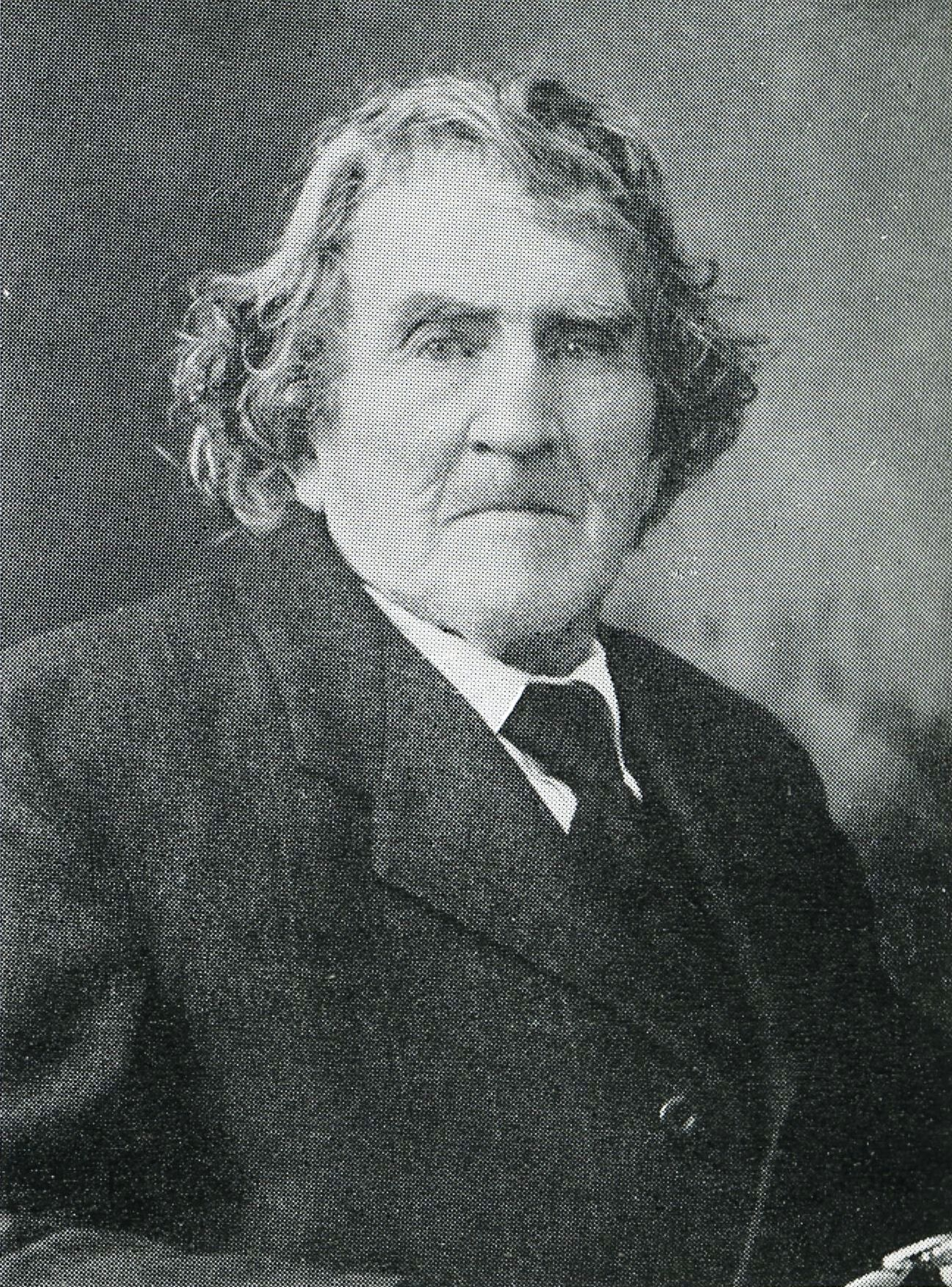

Member of the Oregon House of Representatives
- In office 1870–1871
- Constituency: Polk County

7th Speaker of the Oregon House of Representatives
- In office 1870–1871
- Preceded by: John Whiteaker
- Succeeded by: Rufus Mallory

Personal details
- Born: September 11, 1822 Logan County, Kentucky
- Died: October 29, 1908 (aged 86) Salem, Oregon
- Party: Democratic Party
- Spouse: Zerelda Gibson

Benjamin F. Hayden (September 11, 1822 – October 29, 1908) was an American attorney and politician in the state of Oregon. A native of Kentucky, he moved to the West Coast with the California Gold Rush in 1849 and to Oregon in 1852. A Democrat, he served in the Oregon House of Representatives, including the 1870 session as speaker of the body.

== Early life ==
Hayden was born in Logan County, Kentucky, on September 11, 1822, but grew up in Illinois. As a young man he moved to Missouri before traveling west to California in 1849 for the gold rush. In 1850, Hayden returned to Missouri where he married Zerelda Gibson (b. 1832) who was from Lincoln County, Missouri.

== Oregon ==
In 1852, the couple moved to what was then the Oregon Territory, settling in Polk County in the Willamette Valley. Hayden took up a Donation Land Claim in the Eola Hills near the community of Eola. There he was one of the early settlers and served as the first judge of Polk County in 1852.

In 1855, the Rogue River War began in Southern Oregon, with Hayden forming a company of troops and serving as captain of the company. Following service in the war against the Native Americans, he returned to the practice of law in 1856 and was a prominent lawyer in the Willamette Valley. In 1857, he was elected to represent Polk and Tillamook counties in the Oregon Territorial Legislature.

In 1870, Hayden was elected to the Oregon House of Representatives as a Democrat for a two-year term. Representing Polk County, he was also selected as the speaker of the house for the 1870 legislative session.

== Later years and family ==
Hayden would later move to Salem. He and his wife had six children, Estella, Dora, Benjamin N., Samuel Lee, and George. Oregon historian Ben Maxwell is a grandson. Benjamin Hayden died on October 29, 1908, in Salem and was buried at the Salem Pioneer Cemetery.
