= Keady (surname) =

Keady is a surname. Notable people with the surname include:

- Gene Keady (born 1936), American basketball coach
- Jim Keady (born 1971), American activist, educator, and politician
- Patrick Keady (1832–1908), Irish-American painter, politician, lawyer, and judge
- Tom Keady (1882–1964), American football, basketball, and baseball player and coach
- Tony Keady (1963–2017), Irish hurler
- W. P. Keady (1852–1917), American politician
- William Colbert Keady (1913–1989), United States district judge
