= Hotel deLuxe =

Hotel and historic building in Portland, Oregon, U.S.

- Mallory Hotel
- U.S. National Register of Historic Places
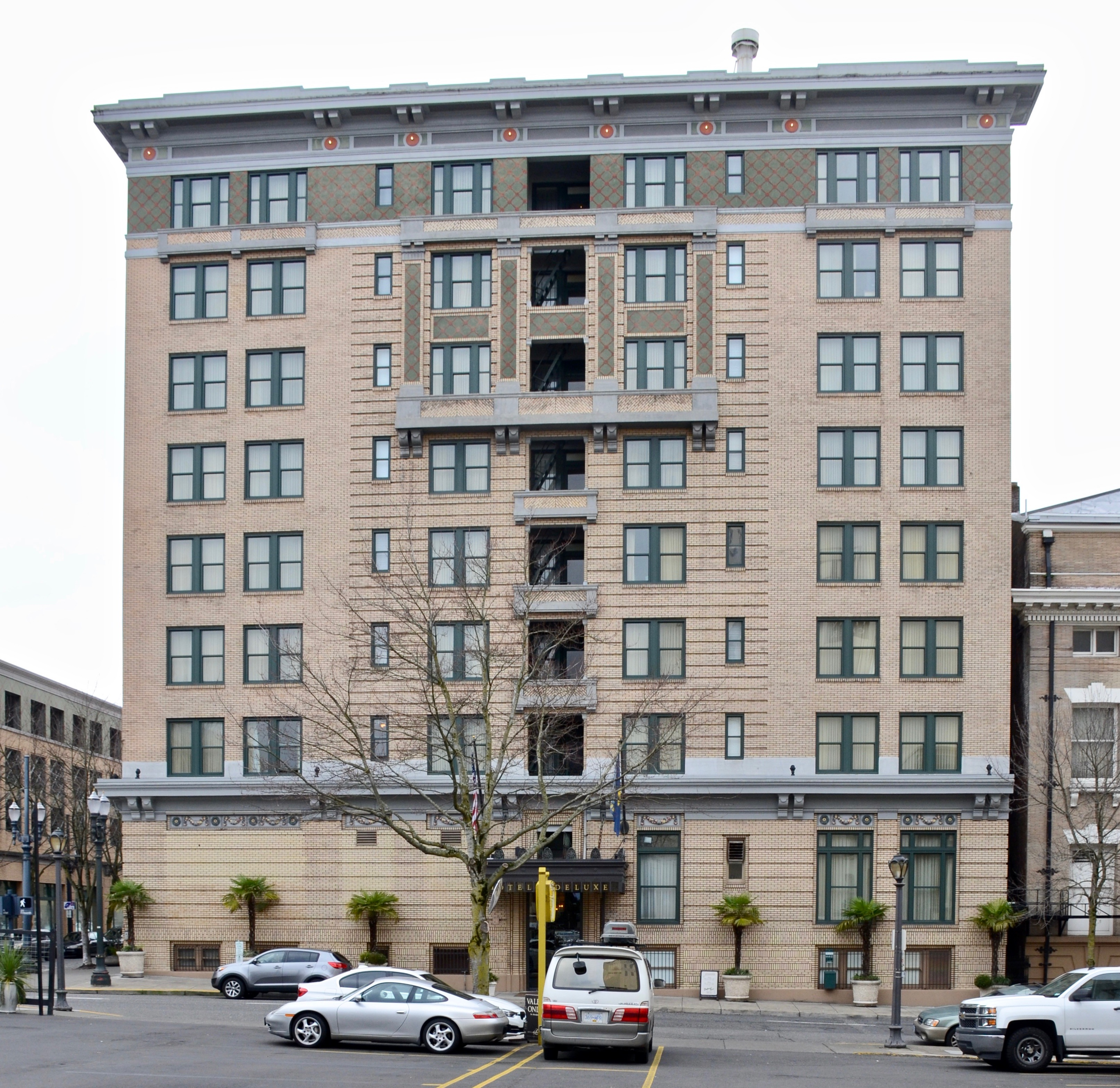
- East façade (front of building) in 2018

- Location within Portland, Oregon
- Location: 729 SW 15th Avenue; Portland, Oregon
- Coordinates: 45°31′15″N 122°41′16″W
- Built: 1912
- Architect: Hans Hanselmann
- Architectural style: Classical Revival
- NRHP reference No.: 06000406
- Added to NRHP: May 19, 2006

The Hotel deLuxe is a hotel located in southwest Portland, Oregon, in the Goose Hollow neighborhood.

== Description and history ==
Logo for Hotel deLuxe

Built in 1912 as the Mallory Hotel, the hotel was commissioned by Rufus Mallory, a Portland lawyer and politician, and is listed on the National Register of Historic Places under its original name. It was sold in 2004, renovated, and reopened as the Hotel deLuxe in 2006. The hotel houses the bar, Driftwood Room.

The hotel is now operated by Pyramid Global Hospitality.

== See also ==
- Lucy A. Mallory
- National Register of Historic Places listings in South and Southwest Portland, Oregon
