= Lucy A. Mallory =

American writer, publisher, newspaper editor

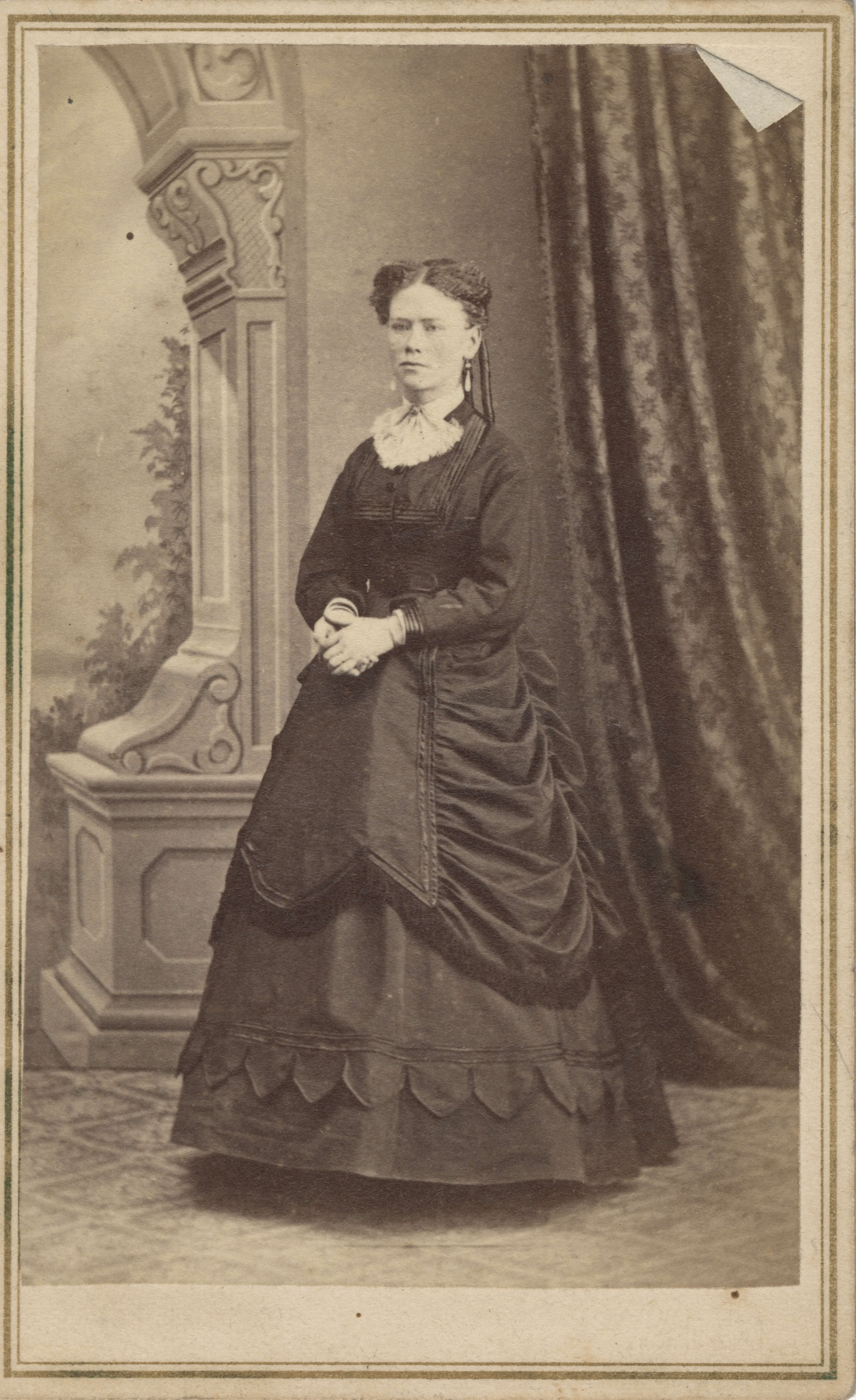
- Mallory in 1875
- Born: Lucy A. Rose c. 1843 or 1856; Michigan, U.S.
- Died: September 4, 1920 (aged 76–77 or 64); San Jose, California, U.S.
- Occupations: Writer, publisher, newspaper editor, spiritualist
- Spouse: Rufus Mallory (m. 1860)
- Children: 2
- Relatives: Aaron Rose (father)
- Writing career
- Language: English
- Notable works: The World's Advance Thought and the Universal Republic
- Literary movement: Metaphysical

Lucy A. Mallory (née, Rose; c. 1843 or 1856 – September 4, 1920) was an American writer, publisher, editor, and spiritualist. She was also a "suffragist, vegetarian, and devotee of metaphysical experiences". Leo Tolstoy was so influenced by Mallory's magazine, the monthly spiritualist, The World's Advance Thought, that he called her the "greatest woman in America". Mallory was editor and publisher of The World's Advance Thought and the Universal Republic — two periodicals printed under one cover — published for more than thirty years. She died in 1920.

== Early life ==
Lucy A. Rose was born c. 1843 in Michigan and grew up in Roseburg, Oregon. (Note: Willard (1893) states that Mallory was born in 1846 in Roseburg, Oregon. Anderson (2014) stated that Mallory was a native of Michigan, which is corroborated by Charles F. Ritter and John Wakelyn in American Legislative Leaders, 1850-1910 (1989). There is some dispute over her birth year; the Oregon Historical Society states she was born in 1843, while Prince & Schaffer (2017) record her year of birth as 1856. The California Birth Index cites her age at the time of her death in 1920 as 64, which indicates she would have been born c. 1846.) Her father, Aaron Rose, settled in Oregon early in the 1840s, and the city of Roseburg was named for him. He was one of the first European settlers at a time when the country was an unbroken wilderness. Her mother, Minerva Kellogg Rose, died in giving birth to Lucy. Mallory was reared among Native Americans.

== Career ==
On June 24, 1860, she married Rufus Mallory, who afterwards represented Oregon in Congress, and who was later one of the most successful lawyers in the Pacific Northwest, and was the senior member of the extensive law firm to which Senator Joseph N. Dolph belonged. She accompanied her husband to Washington, D.C., after which they returned to Salem, Oregon.

In 1874, the old slavery prejudice was so strong in Oregon that some forty-five African American and mulatto children were prevented from attending the Salem public schools and kept from all chance of acquiring an education, as no Caucasian teachers would condescend to teach them. A public fund was set apart for them, but no one came forward to labor for it. Mallory volunteered to instruct the children, in the face of sneers and ridicule. Her course shamed the people into a sense of duty, and within three years, friction and opposition ended, and the children were admitted into the public schools and classes. Mallory, having no immediate use for the public money which she drew for her work, let it remain in the bank.

In 1886, she used the fund for the purchase of a printing plant, and soon after, started her monthly magazine, the World's Advanced Thought, with Judge Horatio N. Maguire for assistant editor. After Maguire retired from editorial connection, on account of the pressure of other business affairs, he still contributed to its pages, while Mallory, who was always the proprietor, had full control. Her magazine circulated among advanced thinkers and workers. Tolstoy subscribed to it.

Mallory established and maintained the first free reading room in Portland. For thirty years, it was open to all who would enter it. In it were many rare books of spiritualism and philosophy, as well as periodicals, not easily obtainable elsewhere. Mallory, with her All World Soul Communion hour, to be observed around the world, was the pioneer in the "going into the Silence" idea, collectively. Many New Thought groups have since practised this method of attaining unity of thought. In addition to her reading room and periodicals, Mallory kept parlors open for meetings held twice or three times a week. Often these were addressed by speakers of world reputation, but oftener, those with unusual ideas spoke there as the one place in the city where they could utter their thoughts in a friendly and hospitable atmosphere. Many tried their speaking powers here for the first time. Elizabeth Towne, publisher of Nautilus Magazine, Holyoke, Massachusetts, was one of these. Prince & Schaffer (2017) described Mallory as an "anarchist creative" with her cultural club, the Association of Artists and Authors. Mallory was always a vegetarian.

Mallory was a Life Member of the National American Woman Suffrage Association. In the early 1900s, the Oregon Vegetarian Society held meetings in the "Advance Thought" parlor at the Hotel Mallory, the parlor being owned by Mallory.

== Personal life ==
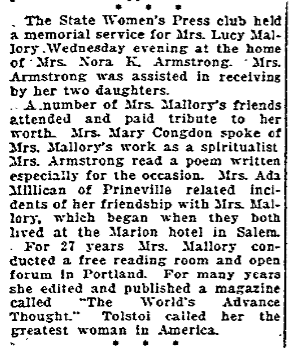
Notice of Mallory's memorial, "Women's Activities". The Morning Oregonian. Vol. XXXIX, no. 38. September 19, 1920. p. 10.

Her work, like that of her husband, was in Portland, but their home was on their ranch or fruit farm, 4 miles (6.4 km) out in the suburbs of the city. She had two children, Elmer Ellsworth (1862–1918), and Lulu (1872-1872), who died after 13 days. Mallory died in 1920, at age 76, in San Jose, California.

== Works cited ==
- Anderson, Heather Arndt (13 November 2014). Portland: A Food Biography. Rowman & Littlefield Publishers. ISBN 978-1-4422-2739-2.
- Bennion, Sherilyn Cox (1990). Equal to the Occasion: Women Editors of the Nineteenth-century West. University of Nevada Press. p. 142. ISBN 978-0-87417-163-1.
- Prince, Tracy J.; Schaffer, Zadie J. (2017). Notable Women of Portland. Arcadia Publishing. ISBN 978-1-4671-2505-5.
- Ritter, Charles F.; Wakelyn, Jon L. (1989). American Legislative Leaders, 1850-1910. Westport, Connecticut: Greenwood Press. ISBN 978-0-313-23943-4.
- Tolstoy, Leo (1 January 2018). Calendar of Wisdom. Alma Books. ISBN 978-0-7145-4569-1.
