= Scott Mountain (Douglas County, Oregon) =

Mountain in Oregon, United States

Coordinates: 43°22′20″N 123°3′54″W

Scott Mountain is a table mountain (a.k.a. table hill) in Douglas County, Oregon, United States with an elevation of 4,264 ft (1,300 m) and stands as one of the notable geographic features in the area, attracting outdoor enthusiasts and nature lovers. Both Scott Mountain and Mount Scott, in Klamath County, Oregon, are named after an early Oregon politician named Levi Scott.

== History ==
Historically, Scott Mountain and the surrounding region were inhabited by Native American tribes, including the Umpqua, who utilized the area for hunting, fishing, and gathering. Early European settlers, including Levi Scott and the Applegate brothers, began moving into the area in the 19th century, with the establishment of the Applegate Trail bringing more settlers through the region.

In the 20th century, the Umpqua National Forest was established, which helped to preserve the area surrounding Scott Mountain for future generations. The mountain has since become an important part of Oregon’s natural heritage, valued both for its beauty and its role in the local ecosystem.

The lookout tower on Scott Mountain has been used by the Douglas Forest Protective Association since 1912 and, according to an article published in 1982 and mentioned on the U.S. Geological Survey (USGS) website, Scott Mountain has also been known as Scott's Point.

== Geography ==
Scott Mountain is situated in the southern part of Douglas County, approximately 20 miles east of Roseburg, the county seat. It is located within the boundaries of the Umpqua National Forest and lies near the North Umpqua River. The region surrounding the mountain is characterized by rugged terrain and dense forest cover. The southern entrance to Scott Mountain is located a few miles east of Glide.

== The 2020 Archie Creek Fire ==
In September 2020, the Archie Creek Fire ravaged much of the Umpqua National Forest, including Scott Mountain. The fire, which started in the early fall, burned through 130,000 acres of forest, destroying trees, vegetation, and wildlife habitats across the area. The blaze, which was one of the largest in Oregon that year, severely impacted the region, including the slopes of Scott Mountain.

The Archie Creek Fire began near the small community of Steamboat, Oregon and spread rapidly due to dry conditions and high winds. By the time it was fully contained in late October 2020, the fire had scorched over 130,000 acres, including parts of Scott Mountain and surrounding forests. The fire destroyed large swaths of mature timber, leaving a charred landscape where dense coniferous forests once thrived. As recent as December 2023, PacifiCorp, an electric utility provider in the Pacific Northwest, agreed to pay $299 million to victims of fires in southern Oregon.

=== Post-fire recovery ===
In the aftermath of the fire, efforts to restore the land and support ecological recovery began, although much of the area around Scott Mountain remains in various stages of regrowth. The fire's effects were felt not just by local wildlife but also by the people living in nearby communities, as the fire caused evacuations and significant property damage.

The long-term environmental impact of the fire on Scott Mountain is still seen today. While some vegetation has begun to return, much of the forest on the mountain is still in recovery. Efforts to stabilize the soil, reduce erosion, and promote the growth of new vegetation are ongoing. In some areas, efforts are also being made to monitor wildlife populations and ensure that species that rely on the ecosystem can return to the region.

== Climate ==
Scott Mountain experiences relatively mild climate. The area sees significant rainfall in the winter months, contributing to the once lush forested environment. Snowfall occurs at higher elevations during the winter, but it is not as consistent or heavy as in other, more mountainous regions of Oregon.

The climate also plays a role in the ecological diversity of the area, supporting a wide range of plant and local animal species. The region's moderate temperatures and abundant precipitation make it an ideal environment for the growth of tall coniferous trees that once dominated the landscape.

== Nearby features ==
Scott Mountain is located near several other natural landmarks within Douglas County, including the North Umpqua River and Diamond Lake. These areas offer additional opportunities for outdoor recreation and serve as key components of the region's natural environment. Nearby towns, such as Glide and Roseburg, Oregon provide services to visitors traveling to the area.
