= Samuel Parker (Oregon politician) =

American politician (1806–1886)

President of the Council of the Oregon Territorial Legislature
- In office 1849; 1851
- Preceded by: position created W. W. Buck
- Succeeded by: W. W. Buck; Ralph Wilcox
- Constituency: Marion County, Oregon

Member of the Oregon House of Representatives
- In office 1860–1861
- Preceded by: T. T. Thomas
- Succeeded by: I. R. Moores
- Constituency: Marion County

Personal details
- Born: 1806
- Died: 1886 (aged 79–80) Oregon
- Party: Democrat
- Spouse(s): Elizabeth Sutton (d. 1845); Rosetta Spears

Samuel Parker (1806–1886) was an American pioneer of the Oregon Country, in what was to become the state of Oregon. Parker would later participate in the legislatures of the provisional, territorial, and state governments of Oregon.

== Early life ==
Samuel Parker was born in 1806. He married around 1828 to Miss Elizabeth Sutton, and they had ten children together. In 1845, the entire family began traveling the Oregon Trail, leaving behind their home in Van Buren County, Iowa. The Parkers joined the New London Emigrating Company wagon train that left Independence, Missouri, under the leadership of wagon train captain Abner Hackleman. The Parker family took the Meek Cutoff that meandered through the eastern and central parts of what is now the state of Oregon. During the journey, in October 1845, Samuel Jr. was born at The Dalles, Oregon. The infant died there along with his mother, Elizabeth, not long after the death of one of Samuel and Elizabeth’s daughters.

== Oregon ==
Arriving in the Willamette Valley in November 1845, Samuel Parker settled in Oregon City, Oregon. Samuel remarried in 1846 to Rosetta Spears. Parker would later move to present-day Marion County.

During the Cayuse War, a band of the Klamath tribe entered the Willamette Valley while the Oregon militia was on the east side of the Cascade Range. Parker was one of the volunteers who formed another militia in March 1848 that would battle the Klamath at the Battle of Abiqua, where he served as a captain. William Parker, not Samuel, fought in the battle of the Abiqua and founded the ghost town of Parkersville, near Silverton, OR.

== Political career ==
In 1848, Parker was elected to the Provisional Legislature of Oregon to represent the Champoeg District in the last session of that body before the territorial government was formed in early 1849. At the first session of the Oregon Territorial Legislature in 1849, Parker served Champoeg as a member of the upper chamber Council, and was elected president of that chamber. He also served in 1850 and in 1851, serving as president of the Council in 1851.

In 1858, he returned to the legislature for the final session before statehood. Parker was elected as a Democrat to the Council to represent Marion County, the new name for the Champoeg District. His final political office was in the first session of the Oregon Legislative Assembly in 1860, when he was elected to the Oregon House of Representatives.
