= W. P. Keady =

American politician (1852–1917)

Speaker of the Oregon House of Representatives
- In office 1885
- Preceded by: George W. McBride
- Succeeded by: J. T. Gregg
- In office 1893
- Preceded by: Theodore Thurston Geer
- Succeeded by: Charles B. Moores

Personal details
- Born: William P. Keady; April 1, 1852 Washington County, Pennsylvania, U.S.
- Died: September 16, 1917 (aged 65) Portland, Oregon, U.S.
- Party: Republican
- Spouse: Julia G. (Wilson) Crump
- Children: 3
- Profession: businessman

William P. Keady (April 1, 1852 – September 16, 1917) was an American politician who served in the Oregon House of Representatives. He was chosen to serve as Speaker of that body in 1885 and 1893. He was first elected to the House to represent Benton County in 1882 and served until 1885. In 1892, he was elected once again to the House, this time to represent Multnomah County.
