= Aaron Rose (pioneer) =

American pioneer

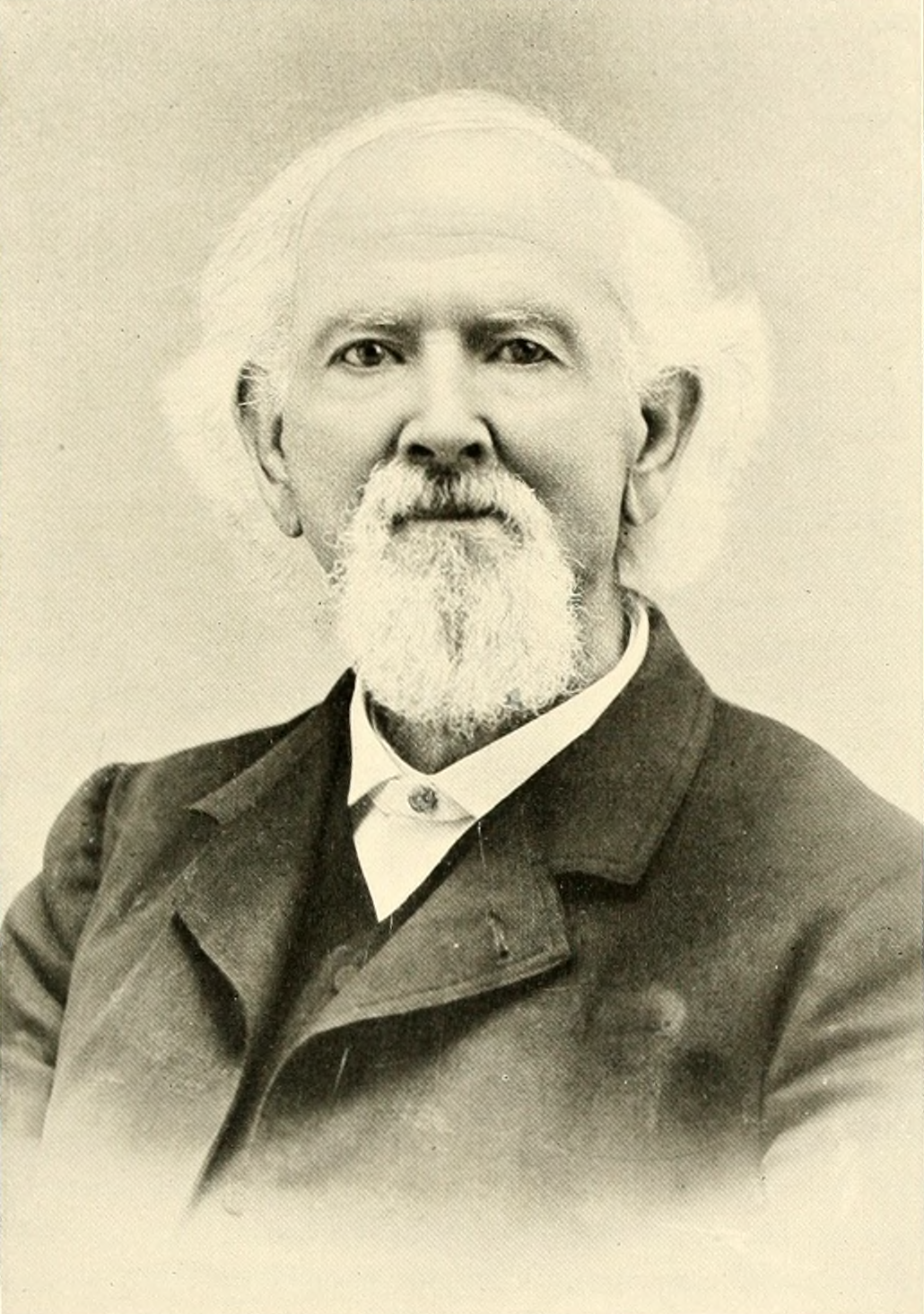
Aaron Rose, founder of Roseburg

Aaron Rose (1813–1899) was an American pioneer of Michigan and Oregon, who founded the city of Roseburg, Oregon.

== Early years ==
Rose was born in southeastern New York state, in 1813. He had at least one sibling, a brother, Abram.

== Career ==
After aiding in the pioneer development of Michigan, he left those forests in 1851, traveled the Applegate Trail, and arrived at the junction of Oregon's South Umpqua River and Deer Creek on September 23, 1851. His family and belongings were conveyed along with him in the prairie vehicle of the time, moved by oxen. Here, he settled on a donation claim of 320 acres (130 ha) from the government, the site which Roseburg now occupies.

He built him a clapboard shanty of sufficiently ample dimensions, near the place where the center of the city now is, and engaged in selling to travelers, teamsters and packers, who were very numerous in those days, such things as they needed. He also engaged in the business of farming and stock raising. Uncle Aaron, as he was familiarly called, seems to have thrived and prospered well in his mercantile and other pursuits, notwithstanding the fact that he sometimes saved money by taking his customers' notes for less than half the amount they owed him. In the early days, Rose stated, that money was more plentiful than provisions. Eggs and apples sold readily at US$1 apiece, and flour at US$1 a pound. Gold dust was the principal form of exchange.

Rose held out the most liberal inducements for people to locate in Roseburg and join him in building up a flourishing city. Every manufacturing enterprise, and many of the leading mercantile houses in Roseburg at the end of the 19th-century, were given free sites and free lots.

When the Southern Pacific Railroad was being built through Oregon, Rose gave the company a land subsidy valued at US$30,000 to run through Roseburg, which is now the end of one of the divisions of the road. To the Roseburg & Coos Bay Railroad, Rose gave five acres of land for depot facilities. All eight churches in Roseburg in his day, were given a lot free and money in addition to aid in the construction of the buildings. Rose, besides being Roseburg's leading benefactor, also did much for charity.

Prior to 1860, Rose gave most of his time to farming, before the building up of Roseburg, having become interested in the various city enterprises, both as a shareholder and in encouraging such institutions as city water works, electric lights, and so forth, by giving liberal bonuses. Rose owned the New Era flour mills which had a daily capacity of 75 barrels, and a warehouse capacity of 25,000 bushels.

== Personal life ==
Rose married three or four times, and had several children.

With his first wife, Minerva, he had three daughters, including, Lucy A. Mallory. With his third wife, Frances, he had five children.

He died in 1899. (Note: According to Gaston (1911), Rose died in 1901.)
