= Ira F. M. Butler =

American pioneer and politician

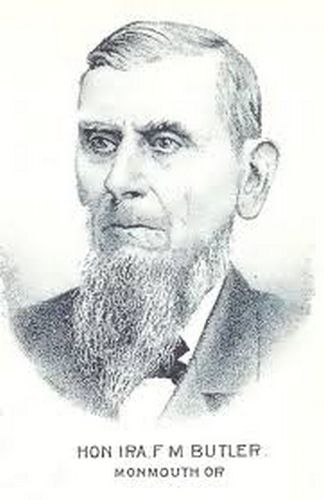
- Oregon legislator Ira Butler, 1889

9th Speaker of the Oregon Territory House of Representatives
- In office December 7, 1857 – February 5, 1858
- Preceded by: La Fayette Grover
- Succeeded by: Territorial Government dissolved

Member of the Oregon Territory House of Representatives
- In office 1854; 1857-1858
- Constituency: Polk County

Member of the Oregon House of Representatives from the 31st district
- In office 1860-1861

Personal details
- Born: May 20, 1812 Barren County, Kentucky, US
- Died: January 16, 1909 (aged 96) Monmouth, Oregon, US
- Party: Democratic
- Spouse: Mary Ann Davidson

Ira Francis Marion Butler (May 20, 1812 – January 16, 1909) was an American politician who served in the Oregon Territorial House of Representatives and the Oregon House of Representatives as a member of the Democratic Party. He served as Speaker of the Oregon House of Representatives from 1857 to 1858, which was the last session before Oregon's statehood. Before immigrating to Oregon, Butler served as sheriff of Warren County, Illinois, and was circuit court clerk for Stephen A. Douglas when he was an Illinois judge. After moving to Oregon in 1853, he operated a farm in Polk County and was later the county's judge.

== Early life ==
Ira Francis Marion Butler was born in Barren County, Kentucky, on May 20, 1812. He was the son of Major Peter Butler and Rachel Cooke (Murphy) Butler. He was the oldest of their ten children. His father was a farmer who served in the militia during the War of 1812 and later the Black Hawk War, attaining the rank of Major. Butler's formal education was very limited. Instead, he learned to read and write on his own while working on his family's farm.

In 1829, the Butler family moved to Illinois, settling in Warren County. During the Black Hawk War of 1832, he served as a private in an Illinois militia company commanded by his father. Butler married Mary Ann Davidson on November 5, 1835. Together, they had eight children (however, only six lived to adulthood).

When his father became Warren County sheriff, Butler was hired as a deputy sheriff. Butler became sheriff when his father retired from the post in 1838. Four years later, he was appointed circuit court clerk under judge Stephen A. Douglas. Butler held that position for seven years.

== Oregon settler ==
In 1853, Butler decided to move his family west to the Oregon Territory. After selling his farm in Illinois, he was elected captain of a wagon train bound for Oregon. He led his company to Oregon's Willamette Valley. Butler settled in Polk County, where he filed a Donation Land Act claim for 320 acres (130 ha) along the Luckiamute River. Three years later, he sold the land claim property and purchased 640 acres (260 ha) near modern-day Monmouth.

In the mid-1850s, Butler helped lay out the plat map for the town of Monmouth and was one of five community leaders who proposed naming the town after Monmouth, Illinois. The name was approved by local citizens during a community meeting. The community also agreed to establish Monmouth University with funds from the sale of town lots. Butler was a founding member of the university's board of trustees. In 1856, the first commercial building was built at the town site and a post office was established in 1859, shortly after Oregon became a state.

== Legislator and judge ==
Butler was a staunch Democrat throughout his life. In 1854, he decided to run for a seat in Oregon's territorial House of Representatives representing Polk County. He was opposed by William Gilliam. Butler was elected by a comfortable margin, receiving 397 votes against 93 votes for Gilliam. Butler took his seat in the Oregon House on December 4, 1854, representing Polk County (designated District 1). He served through the 1854 regular legislative session which ended on February 1.

Butler did not serve in the 1855 or 1856 legislatures. However, he was re-elected to Oregon House in 1857, again representing Polk County. The 1857 territorial legislative session opened on December 7. When the House was organized, Butler was a candidate for speaker. He was elected to the position, receiving 16 votes from members of the House while William M. King of Multnomah County received 8 votes with both Butler and King voting for Nathaniel H. Gates of Wasco County. As the session began, Governor George L. Curry delivered a message highlighting the settlement and growth of the territory. He also pointed out changes which would take place when Oregon achieved statehood. During the session, the legislature elected territorial officers and after conducting other required business adjourned on February 5, 1858.

After the legislature adjourned in early 1858, Butler returned to Polk County. In June, he served as chairman of the Polk County Democratic convention. During the convention, he was selected to run as the party's candidate for county probate judge. He was elected to that position in the general election that followed.

Oregon became a state in February 1859. The following year, Polk County's Democratic convention nominated Butler and C. C. Cram for the two House seats that represented the county in the state legislature. In the 1860 general election, both Butler and Cram won seats in the Oregon House of Representatives. Butler took his House seat representing Polk County's District 31 when the session opened on September 10, 1860. He served through the session which lasted a little over five weeks, ending on October 19.

== Later life ==
After completing his third term in the Oregon House of Representatives, Butler returned to his farm in Polk County. As events began to move the country towards civil war, Butler remained a strong supporter of the Union. In 1861, he helped organize a public meeting to support the United States Government and its elected leaders. Fourteen hundred citizens attended the meeting. The gathering elected him secretary to record and report the meeting's decisions. He was also appointed to the resolutions committee which proposed a strong message supporting the Union. The resolution was adopted by the citizens attending the meeting.

In 1865, Monmouth University merged with another small college and the new institution was renamed Christian College (after several subsequent name changes, the institution is now Western Oregon University). Butler remained an active supporter of the college, becoming chairman of the school's board of trustees in 1880. He remained chairman for over a decade. Butler also continued to actively support Democratic candidates and the party's policy platforms. He regularly participated in Polk County Democratic conventions, serving as chairman several times.

In 1873, Butler moved from his rural farm to the town of Monmouth. However, he continued farming on his rural property until 1882. He also remained an active member of the local grange throughout his life.

In 1878, Butler was elected Polk County judge. He served in that position for the next four years. After finishing his term as county judge in 1882, he became the second mayor of Monmouth. He was then appointed town recorder, a position he held for the next decade.

Butler helped establish the Bank of Monmouth in 1888 and remained one of its largest stockholders for the rest of his life. In 1890, he was a founding partner of the Western Oregon Land and Improvement Company. The company was formed with $5,000 of capital for the purpose of making real estate loans in the Polk County area. Butler was elected the company's first president.

In his advanced years, Butler lived in Monmouth with his two unmarried daughters, who took care of him at home. Butler died on January 16, 1909, at his home in Monmouth, Oregon. His funeral was held at the Monmouth Christian Church. He was buried near his wife and other members of their family in the Butler-Davidson Cemetery in Monmouth.
