= Nathaniel H. Gates =

Oregon lawyer and state legislator (1811–1889)

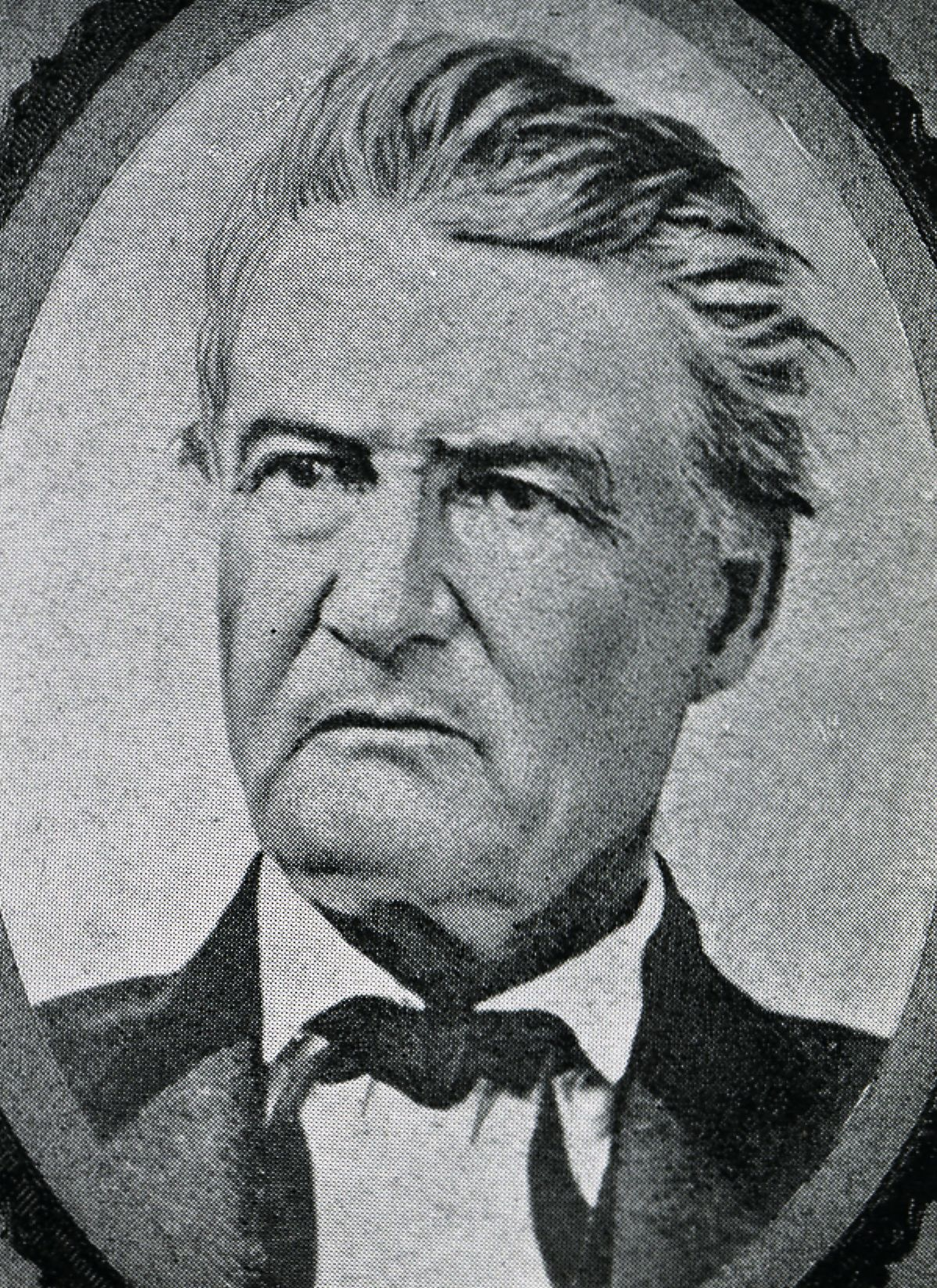
- Oregon state legislator N. H. Gates

Speaker of the Oregon Territory House of Representatives
- In office December 6, 1858 – February 13, 1859
- Preceded by: Ira F. M. Butler
- Succeeded by: Position abolished William G. T'Vault as Speaker of the Oregon House of Representatives

Member of the Oregon Territory House of Representatives
- In office 1855–1859
- Constituency: Wasco County

Member of the Oregon Senate from the 27 district
- In office 1880–1883
- Preceded by: S. G. Thompson
- Succeeded by: C. S. Cartwright
- Constituency: Lake and Wasco counties

Member of the Oregon House of Representatives from the 55 district
- In office 1878–1879

Personal details
- Born: February 17, 1811 Washington County, Ohio, U.S.
- Died: May 20, 1889 (aged 78) The Dalles, Oregon, U.S.
- Party: Democratic
- Spouses: Mary Koontz (m. 1834; died 1868); Mary Shubnel (m. 1868)
- Education: Muskingum Academy
- Profession: Lawyer

Nathaniel Holly Gates, also known as Colonel Gates for most of his life, (1811–1889) was an American pioneer lawyer and Oregon state legislator. He was an active Democrat throughout his life. He served four terms in Oregon's territorial legislature. This included one term as Speaker of the Oregon House of Representatives during the 1858 legislative session. After Oregon became a state in 1859, he served one two-year term in the Oregon House of Representatives and one four-year term in the Oregon State Senate. Before immigrating to Oregon, Gates lived and worked as a lawyer in Ohio and Iowa. After moving to Oregon, he settled in The Dalles and opened a law practice there. He helped develop that community and served as the city's mayor five times in non-consecutive terms.

== Early life ==
Gates was probably born on February 17, 1811, in Washington County, Ohio. He was the fourth son of Stephen Gates and Jerusha (Perry) Gates. He was raised on a farm in Gallia County, Ohio, where he attended local public schools. Gates probably attended college at Muskingum Academy (now Marietta College) in Marietta, Ohio. Several of his brothers and cousins also attended college in Marietta.

As a young man, Gates worked as a carpenter while he prepared for his bar examination. He was admitted to the Ohio bar in 1834 and then began practicing law in the state. Gates married Mary Koontz, known as Polly, on May 29, 1834, in Gallia, Ohio. Gates and his family migrated to Iowa in 1841.

== Oregon pioneer ==
In 1850, Gates moved to California while his family remained in Iowa. At that time, the California Gold Rush was underway and he spent the next two years mining and working in trade jobs. In 1852, his family crossed the North American plains in an ox-drawn wagon to join Gates on the west coast. The family spent the winter in Portland, Oregon, before moving to an area on the north side of the Columbia River near the Cascades (across the river from modern-day Cascade Locks). In 1854, Gates and his family moved to the south side of the river to avoid an Indian uprising in their area. The family settled near Fort Dalles.

Once he was settled in the Fort Dalles area, Gates became involved in both Oregon territorial politics and local government affairs. Gates was appointed to the rank of colonel in the Oregon militia by the territorial governor. From that time on, he was commonly known as "Colonel Gates". He helped develop the region around Fort Dalles, opening a hotel in the area. He also helped plan and construct the area's first courthouse and public jail.

On September 15, 1855, Gates was selected as chairman of a meeting of local residents held to discuss organizing a city government for the community around Fort Dalles. It was decided that the community would hold an election to select trustees to oversee the town's development. The election was held on April 7, 1856. Gates was elected as one of the town's three trustees. Members of the community also selected Gates as their delegate in the territorial House of Representatives and directed him to introduce a bill to incorporate Dalles City. He won his seat by a comfortable margin, 80 votes to 7 for his opponent, W. C. Laughlin.

== Territorial legislator ==
Gates took his seat in the Oregon House on December 1, 1855. He represented Wasco County, which had been created during the previous legislative session. At that time, Wasco County included all of eastern Oregon and southern Idaho from the crest of the Cascade Range to the summit of the Rocky Mountains, a total of about 130,000 square miles (340,000 km^{2}). The 1855 session ended on January 31, 1856. During the session, Gates introduced a bill to incorporate the Fort Dalles community, as instructed by his constituents. The bill passed and was signed by Governor George Curry. The following year, Dalles City was officially incorporated.

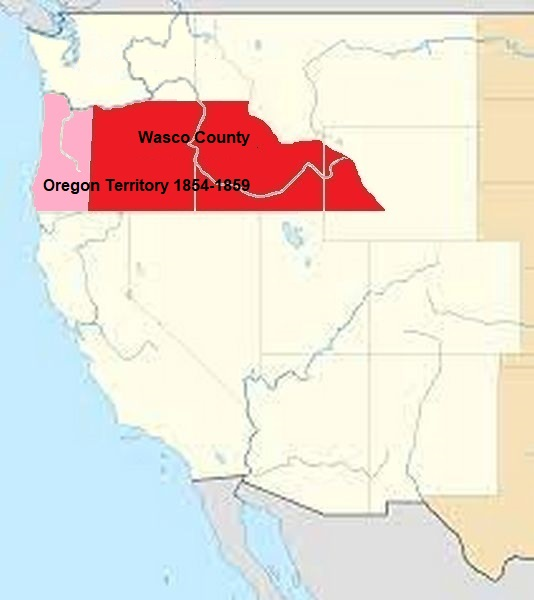
Oregon Territory's Wasco County, 1854–1859

After returning to the Fort Dalles area Gate wrote the original city charter for Dalles City. The Dalles City community elected their first city council before the city was officially incorporated. Gates was one of the councilmen elected in 1856. He served three consecutive one-year terms, including one term as council president in 1857.

At that time, legislative terms were for one year only. Gates ran for reelection 1856 and retained his seat. In that election, he received 130 votes; his opponent, A. G. Tripp, received 30 votes. Gates returned to the Oregon territorial House, representing Wasco County, in 1856. The 1856 legislative session began on December 1 and lasted through January 29, 1857. After the session adjourned, Gates attended the Wasco County Democratic convention that nominated delegates to attend Oregon's Constitutional Convention.

In the 1857 election, Gates was unopposed for the Wasco County House seat. The 1857 legislative session began on December 7 and lasted two months, adjourning on February 5, 1858.

In 1858, Oregon voters elected two legislatures: a state legislature, which would be seated if statehood was approved in 1858, and a separate territorial legislature, which would convene if admission to the Union were delayed. The Wasco County Democratic convention nominated Gates to run for a fourth term in the territorial House of Representatives as the official Democratic candidate. No other candidates ran for the territorial representative position, since it was hoped that statehood would be achieved prior to the next regular legislative session.

The state representatives assembled in July and September but quickly adjourned when it became clear that the United States Congress had not yet acted on Oregon statehood. By December, no statehood decision had been made, so the territorial legislature was seated to conduct required government business. When the territorial legislature was convened on December 6, 1858, Gates served as chairman of the credential committee. The following day, the House was organized and Gates was elected speaker. During the session, legislators discussed changing the location of Oregon's capital. However, none of the rival cities to Salem could gather enough votes to advance a bill to move the capital. At the close of the session, Speaker Gates noted that the conflict regarding the capital's location divided the legislature but that the discussion on the issue was conducted with courtesy that reflected credit on the members of the House. The legislature finished its business and adjourned on January 22, 1859. Oregon was officially admitted to the Union three weeks later, on February 14, 1859.

== State and local affairs ==
When Oregon became a state, the territorial government ceased to exist, and Gates returned to Dalles City. He remained active in state politics and continued serving in local government. In 1859, he was elected to the Oregon Democratic Party's newly formed state central committee, representing Wasco County. He remained a member of the party's state central committee into the 1880s. That same year, he left the Dalles City council and was elected city treasurer. In 1860, Dalles City was officially renamed "The Dalles".

In 1862, the Oregon Supreme Court formally approved the first three lawyers to practice law in state courts. The following year, Gates was among the second group of lawyers to be admitted to the Oregon bar. After being admitted to the bar, he opened a law practice in The Dalles in partnership with O. T. Tuthill.

In 1862, Gates ran for the Wasco County seat in the state House of Representatives. However, he lost to Orlando Humason by a vote of 445 to 166. Two years later, he ran for Wasco County prosecutor, but lost to C. R. Meigs, 734 to 542. Despite these losses in Wasco County races, Gates remained popular in The Dalles. He was elected mayor in 1865, the first of his five non-consecutive terms in that position. The other four terms began in 1871, 1877, 1878, and 1886. He alternated service as mayor with three terms on the city council, with short breaks when he left city government. In addition, Gates served as chairman of the Wasco County Democratic Convention in 1866.

Gates was a member of the Independent Order of Odd Fellows. He was active in the Odd Fellows Columbia Lodge which was located in The Dalles. The Columbia Lodge selected him to represent its members at the Grand Lodge of Oregon conclave in 1866.

Gates's first wife died in September 1868. She was buried at the Pioneer Cemetery in The Dalles. He married his second wife, Mary C. Shubnel, on November 24, 1868, in Wasco County.

In 1872, Gates was elected Wasco County judge. He won the election with 494 votes, defeating Republican Thomas Gordon, who received 378 votes. Two years later, Gates represented Wasco County at the state Democratic convention. The convention nominated him as a presidential elector for Horace Greeley, who was running against Ulysses S. Grant that year.

In late 1872, Governor La Fayette Grover appointed Gates to the State Board of Equalization, along with former governors John Whiteaker and George Curry, with Whiteaker serving as chairman. The equalization board was responsible for standardizing property tax assessments throughout the state and ensuring that county assessors applied tax laws fairly and as intended by the legislature. The following year, Gates served as the board's chairman. Governor Grover also promoted Gates to the rank of brigadier general in the Oregon militia.

Back in Wasco County, Gates was active in a number of business enterprises. In 1872, he became chairman of the Dalles and Sandy Wagon Road Commission. As chairman, he was responsible for overseeing a $30,000 offering of state warrants to finance construction of the road. In 1874, Gates and two partners formed the Dalles City Water Company. The company was capitalized with $20,000 of stock.

== State legislator ==
In 1878, Gates decided to run for a seat in Oregon's House of Representatives, representing Wasco County. Gates and A. B. Webdell were nominated at the Wasco County Democratic convention for the county's two House seats. The Republican Party nominated A. Allen and E. C. Wyatt. Gates and Webdell won Wasco County's two seats. Webdell received 812 votes. Gates ran second with 793 votes, while Wyatt received 532 votes and Allen trailed with 528 votes.

Gates took his seat in the Oregon House of Representatives on September 13, 1878, representing House District 55. The session lasted for six weeks, adjourning on October 23. During the session, Gates was appointed to the judiciary committee and a special joint committee to audit Oregon's prison operations.

In 1880, Gates decided to run for the Oregon State Senate seat representing Wasco and Lake counties. In the general election, Gates beat Republican N. B. Sinnott in a close election. Gates received 1,082 votes, while Sinnott fell short with 1,020 votes.

Gates took his seat in the Oregon Senate on September 13, 1880, representing Senate District 27. During the session, Gates was a strong advocate for creating a new county in Wasco County's Ochoco Country. The new county was approved. It became Crook County when it was organized in 1882. The 1880 legislative session was adjourned on October 23.

Since state senators served a four-year term, Gates did not have to run for re-election prior to the 1882 legislative session. Oregon's twelfth regular legislative session began on September 11, with Gates again representing Wasco and Lake counties. During the session, he was appointed to the public lands committee. The most important decision the legislature had to make in 1882 was the election of a United States senator to represent Oregon. At that time, United States senators were elected by state legislatures. Gates joined four other Democrats who initially voted for Republican John H. Mitchell. This choice was very unpopular with many Oregon Democrats. However, Gates continued to vote for Mitchell through the 75 ballots that it took to elect a senator. The legislature eventually chose Republican Joseph N. Dolph to fill Oregon's open senate seat. The legislative session ended on October 19. Gates's four-year state senate term expired at the end of 1883 without any additional legislative meetings.

== Later life ==
After the 1882 legislative session ended, Gates returned to his law practice and business interests in The Dalles. He lived and worked in The Dalles for the rest of his life. Gates served on a committee promoting a project to build locks at the Columbia River cascades to allow steamships to navigate around the falls and continue upstream beyond the rapids.

In 1886, Gates and two partners founded the Hood River and Miller Creek Water Ditch and Flume Company. The purpose of the company was to provide water to users in The Dalles. The company was incorporated with 250 shares of stock initially valued at $100 each. The following year, Gates joined seven partners to incorporate The Dalles Publishing Company. The company published a Wasco County newspaper, The Sun, which advocated for the Democratic Party and its candidates. The business was capitalized with a $4,000 stock offering. Gates sold his interest in the paper within a year of its founding. The Sun went out of business in 1894.

Gates died in The Dalles on May 20, 1889, at the age of 78. He was buried in the Odd Fellows Cemetery in The Dalles.
