= Umpqua County, Oregon =

Former county in Oregon, United States (1851–1862)

Coordinates: 43°10′N 123°10′W

Umpqua County was a county located in the U.S. state of Oregon. It was created on January 24, 1851, by the Oregon Territorial Legislature embracing the lands along the Umpqua River in southwestern Oregon. Gold had been discovered in the Umpqua region, which brought a rapid increase of settlers to the new county. The first meeting of the Umpqua County Court was in Elkton in 1852; later the county government was moved to Green Valley and Yoncalla.

On January 7, 1852, the territorial legislature created Douglas County from the eastern part of Umpqua County. On December 22, 1853, part of the western portion of the county was included in the newly formed Coos County. Finally, on October 16, 1862, the remainder of Umpqua county was incorporated into Lane County.

Some accounts state that politics caused the county's end.

== See also ==
- List of former United States counties
- List of counties in Oregon
