= Ralph Wilcox (politician) =

Oregon politician

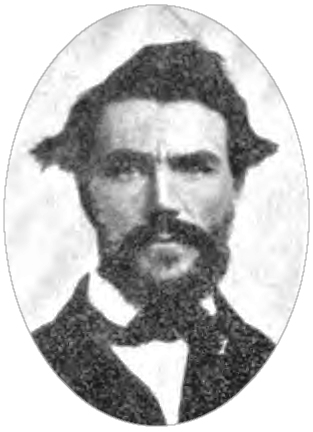

Speaker of the Provisional Legislature of Oregon
- In office December 13, 1848 – February 5, 1849
- Preceded by: Robert Newell
- Succeeded by: Levi A. Rice

Member of the Provisional Legislature of Oregon
- In office December 7, 1847 – February 16, 1849
- Succeeded by: Provisional Government dissolved
- Constituency: Tuality District

Speaker of the Oregon Territory House of Representatives
- In office December 2, 1850 – February 8, 1851
- Preceded by: Asa Lovejoy
- Succeeded by: William M. King

Member of the Oregon Territory House of Representatives
- In office December 2, 1850 – January 21, 1852
- Preceded by: David Hill
- Succeeded by: Seat split into three
- Constituency: Washington County

Oregon Territory Council
- In office 1853–1854
- Constituency: Washington County

Personal details
- Born: July 9, 1818 East Bloomfield, New York
- Died: April 18, 1877 (aged 58) Portland, Oregon
- Spouse: Julia Ann Fickel
- Occupation: physician

Ralph Wilcox (July 9, 1818 – April 18, 1877) was the first teacher and practicing medical doctor in Portland, Oregon. He also served in the Provisional Government of Oregon, was a legislator during both the territorial period and when Oregon became a state, and a judge of Twality County during the provisional government. He killed himself at work at the United States District Court for the District of Oregon in Portland.

== Early life ==
A native of New York, Wilcox was born in East Bloomfield, New York, to Arminta Lee Wilcox and Ralph Wilcox Sr. on July 9, 1818. In New York the younger Ralph graduated from Geneva Medical College in 1839. He then moved to Missouri where he practiced medicine. Then in 1840 Ralph married Julia Ann Fickel, and the couple would have five children. In 1845 the family traveled the Oregon Trail to Oregon Country and took the ill-fated Meek Cutoff.

== Oregon ==
After arriving in Oregon, Wilcox took a job teaching in Portland, Oregon, in 1847 and became the first teacher in that city. Later that year George Abernethy, the governor of the Provisional Government, appointed Wilcox as a county judge for Twality (now Washington) County. Also that year he was elected to the Provisional Legislature. The next year he was elected again and served in the final sessions of the provisional government in 1848 and 1849, including time as the speaker of the assembly.

In 1850 after Oregon had become a United States territory, Wilcox was elected to the Oregon House of Representatives of the Territorial Legislature, replacing David Hill and served as speaker of the body. The following year he returned representing what had become Washington County, but was not selected as speaker. In 1853 he returned to the legislature serving as president of the upper chamber Council.

From 1856 until 1858 Ralph Wilcox served as a registrar for the U. S. Land Office in Oregon City, and then as county judge in Washington County from 1858 to 1862. Wilcox was also elected Oregon City mayor during this time. In 1862 he returned to state politics and was elected as a representative to the Oregon House of Representatives as a Republican from Washington County. Also, from 1862 to 1863 he was the school superintendent for Washington County. During the American Civil War he was surgeon-general for Oregon’s militia, but no Oregon companies saw action in the war due to the distance to the fronts. Then from 1865 to 1877 he was a clerk for the United States District Court for the District of Oregon in Portland.

== Death ==
Ralph Wilcox died on April 18, 1877, at the age of 58. He killed himself after heavy drinking. He shot himself in the head with a Deringer pistol in his office of the federal court with Judge L. Sawyer being the first to discover the act after hearing the shot. Wilcox killed himself in the afternoon just before court was to resume with Matthew Deady and Sawyer. He left behind a wife, and a suicide note blaming drinking for the suicide. Wilcox was buried at Lone Fir Cemetery in East Portland.

== See also ==
- James C. Hawthorne, another early doctor in Portland.
