= Oregon Territorial Legislature =

American legislative body (1848–1859)

- Oregon Territory
- Seal of the Oregon Territory

Type
- Type: Bicameral
- Houses: Lower: House of Representatives; Upper: Council

History
- Established: 1848
- Disbanded: 1859
- Preceded by: Provisional Legislature of Oregon
- Succeeded by: Oregon Legislative Assembly
- Seats: 27 (1849); 35 (1858)

Meeting place
- Oregon City (1849–1851); Salem (1852–1859); Corvallis (1855)

Oregon's Territorial Legislature was a bicameral legislative body created by the United States Congress in 1848 as the legislative branch of the government of the Oregon Territory. The upper chamber Council and lower chamber House of Representatives first met in July 1849; they served as the region's legislative body until Oregon became a state in February 1859, when they were replaced by the bicameral Oregon State Legislature.

Ten annual sessions were held, with most starting in December and ending in February. During the sessions the capital of the territory was moved from Oregon City to Salem, then briefly to Corvallis, and back to Salem. Legislation included the creation of new counties, the renaming of old counties, and the authorization to hold the Oregon Constitutional Convention, among other acts. Membership in the Council remained at nine throughout the history of the body, while the House of Representatives membership increased from 17 to as high as 30 due to increases in population.

== Background ==
The Provisional Government of Oregon was the region's governing body from 1843 until 1849, at the end of the region's joint settlement by Great Britain and the United States. The Provisional Government's legislative body was the unicameral Provisional Legislature of Oregon.

In 1846 the United States and Great Britain settled the Oregon Question with the Oregon Treaty. The treaty created a boundary between British North America and the United States west of the Rocky Mountains at the 49th parallel. Two years later on August 14, 1848 the Organic Act was signed into law by President James K. Polk creating the Oregon Territory out of the lands south of the 49th parallel, north of the 42nd parallel (northern boundary of California) and west of the Rockies to the Pacific Ocean. The structural framework for the government came from the Northwest Ordinance, passed in 1787, which created the Northwest Territory. The Territorial Legislature then worked within the legal framework of the Organic Laws of Oregon. These laws were the de facto constitution of the Provisional Government. These laws were determined to be valid by Territorial Governor Joseph Lane when he arrived in the territory in 1849 and effectuated the beginning of United States control and government in Oregon Country.

== Structure ==
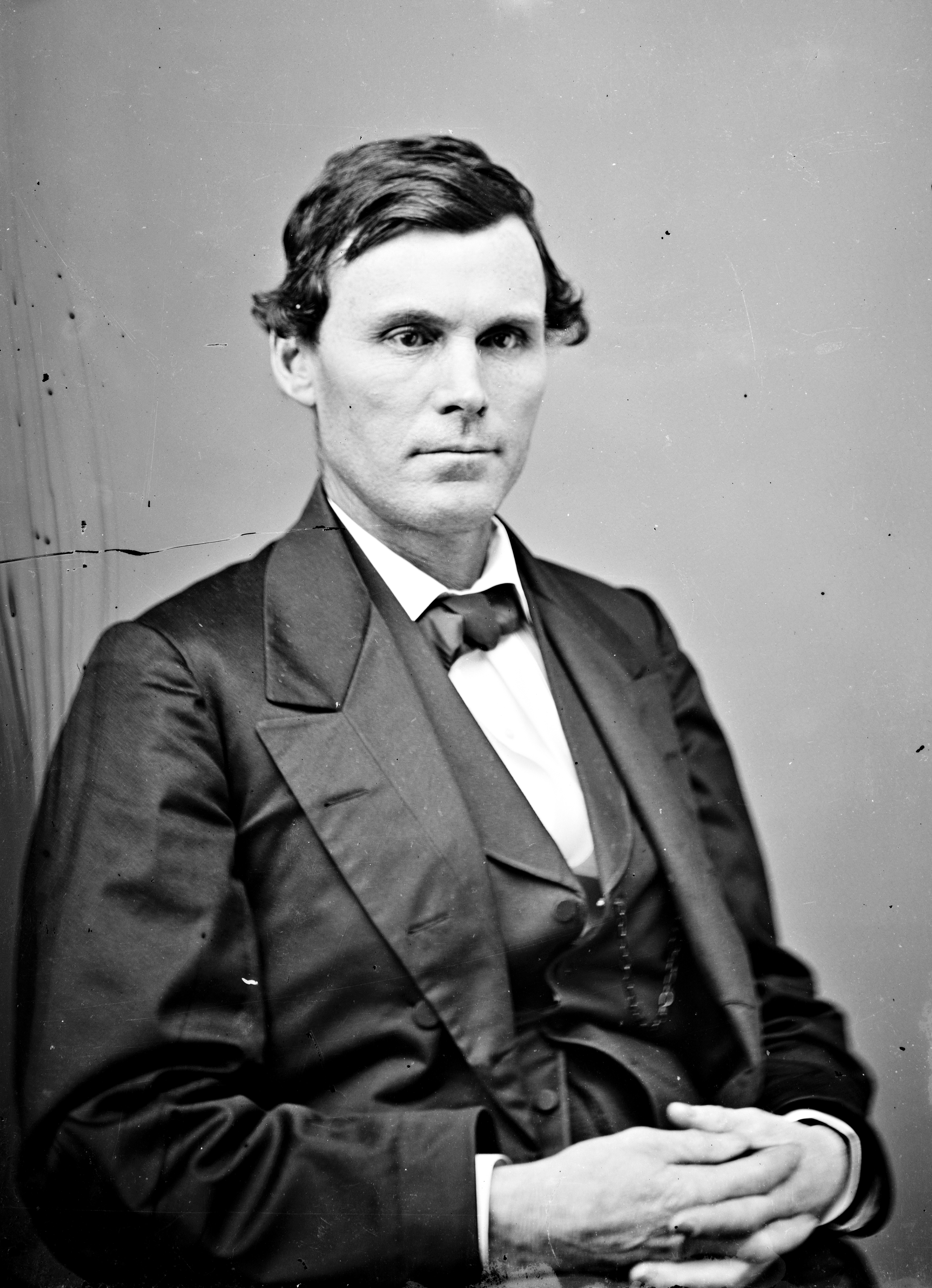
Legislator Benjamin F. Harding.

The legislature had two chambers: the larger, lower House of Representatives, and the upper chamber Council. The Council consisted of nine members, apportioned among the territory's counties. The House had about twice as many members, also apportioned by counties. As the population increased and counties added, the number of legislators in the House was expanded.

== Sessions ==
Though the Oregon Territory was created in August 1848, the territorial government did not arrive and assume power until Joseph Lane arrived on March 2, 1849. The first session of the Legislature convened on July 16, 1849 in Oregon City. Thereafter, regular sessions were held during the winter months of December, January, and February, with special sessions in May 1850 and July 1852.

=== 1849 ===
The first session met from July 16 to September 29 in Oregon City at the Methodist Church. During this session two of the original districts were renamed with Tuality (or Tualatin) County becoming Washington County and Champoeg County becoming Marion County. Also during the 1849 session Vancouver County on the north side of the Columbia River was renamed Clarke County with the "e" later dropped. Additionally, the legislators continued the policy of the Provisional Government and passed a law in September excluding blacks from settling in the Oregon Territory, but allowed those already in the region to remain. The law was later repealed in 1854, but a new version was added in 1857 when Oregon ratified its constitution in preparation for statehood. Asa Lovejoy served as the speaker of the House, and Samuel Parker as the President of the Council.

=== 1850 ===
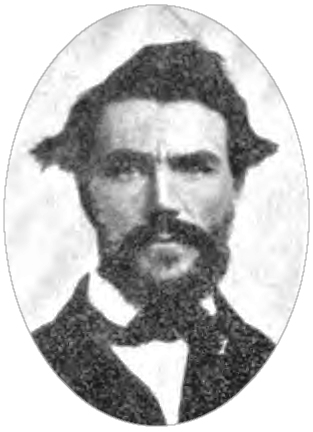
Ralph Wilcox, Speaker of the House for the 1850-51 legislative session.

From December 2, 1850 to February 8, 1851, the second session of the legislature gathered in Oregon City. W. W. Buck served as the President of the Council, Ralph Wilcox as the Speaker of the House.

The 1850-51 session was not a harmonious one, being divided over the controversial matter of location of the Oregon state capital. Legislators were split between the competing claims of Oregon City and Salem, with the majority of legislators backing the latter locale and a minority opining in favor of keeping the center of government at Oregon City. An omnibus location bill awarding Salem the state capital, Portland the territorial penitentiary, and Corvallis the territorial university ultimately passed the legislature by votes of 10-8 in the House and 6-3 in the Council. This matter, which left Oregon City entirely out of the equation, was acutely partisan, with Whigs favoring the historic capital and Democrats endorsing a move to Salem.

During the 1850-51 session the Legislature created three new counties for the Oregon Territory. The first of these, Pacific County, encompassed coastal areas north of the Columbia River, located primarily in today's Washington state. This new county, with Pacific City as the county seat, was created out of the southwest corner of Lewis County. Also established were Lane County, including that portion of the Willamette Valley south of Benton County and Linn County, as well as Umpqua County, comprising the area south of the Calapooya Mountains and headwaters of the Willamette River.

=== 1851 ===
The 1851-52 session of the Oregon Territorial Legislature met from December 1, 1851 to January 21, 1852, at the Oregon Institute in Salem. Samuel Parker served as the President of the Council with William M. King as the Speaker of the House.

The matter of the location of the capital of Oregon remained hotly contested, with the majority assembling in Salem while a rump group consisting of one member of the Council and four members of the House refusing to participate there but instead attempting to establish itself as the legitimate Oregon Territorial Legislature in a session held at the Territorial Library in Oregon City. This rival rump assembly continued to meet in Oregon City for two weeks, replete with the spectacle of Columbia Lancaster making and seconding his own motions in the "Council" himself.

The claims of this minority faction were backed by a 2-1 decision of the Oregon Supreme Court, which supported the view of Governor John P. Gaines that the move from Oregon City to Salem was unconstitutional by virtue of its omnibus nature — which was held to be contrary to the provisions of the act of Congress which organized the territory. This led to a split of the court, with Justice O. C. Pratt leaving Oregon City for Salem. A situation of dual power thus briefly existed, with the (Democratic) majority of the Territorial Legislature and a minority of the Supreme Court sitting in Salem and a (Whig) majority of the Supreme Court and minority of the Legislature sitting in Oregon City.

In the eyes of a majority of Oregonians political legitimacy lay with the elected majority of Legislators in Salem rather than the appointed majority of Supreme Court justices in Oregon City, however, and following a complicated set of maneuvers including redistricting of legal districts and passage of a memorial to the United States Congress for decision, the majority of the Legislature conducted its regular business in Salem as scheduled. A bill was passed calling for convocation of a constitutional convention in the event that Congress refused the appeal of the Legislature for direct election rather than appointment of the Territorial Governor and judges.

On January 12, 1852, the body created Jackson County in the southwest section of the territory. They also carved a swath of Umpqua County to form a new Douglas County, named in honor of Senator Stephen A. Douglas, a Democratic Party stalwart.

=== 1852 ===
In 1852 the Legislature met from December 6, 1852 until February 3, 1853 in Oregon City. On December 22, the two chambers passed an act to dissolve the marriage between David S. Maynard and Lydia A. Maynard, which would later become an issue that worked its way to the United States Supreme Court in the case of Maynard v. Hill. Matthew Deady served as the President of the Council with Benjamin F. Harding as the Speaker of the House for the session.

=== 1853 ===
On March 2, 1853, Washington Territory was created out of the northern and eastern portions of Oregon Territory, eliminating those counties from the Oregon Legislature. The 1853 Legislature met in Salem from December 5, 1853 to February 2, 1854. The legislature created Coos County in southwestern Oregon on the Oregon Coast on December 22, 1853, and Columbia County was created out of the northern portion of Washington County by an act of the body on January 16, 1854. Ralph Wilcox served as the President of the Council with Zebulon C. Bishop as the Speaker of the House.

=== 1854 ===
The 5th Oregon Territorial Legislature convened in Salem on December 4, 1854 and held its proceedings until February 1, 1855. On January 11, 1855, the legislature created Wasco County which at the time encompassed all of Eastern Oregon. Multnomah County was created during this session on December 22, 1854, with eastern Washington County being combined with the northern section of Clackamas County. A bill was submitted during the session to submit to voters the question of holding a convention to draft a constitution in an effort to attain statehood, but the bill was defeated. James K. Kelly served as the President of the Council with L. F. Cartee as the Speaker of the House.

=== 1855 ===
The 6th Territorial Legislature began in Corvallis in the ongoing dispute over which city would become the capital. Late in December the body moved back to Salem where the capitol building was nearing completion, but the building burned down on December 29, 1855. The session began on December 3 and ended on January 31, 1856. On December 18, 1855, the legislature separated the southern part of Coos County, creating Curry County, and then on January 22, 1856, created Josephine County out of the western portion of Jackson County. The legislature tried again to settle the question of holding a constitutional convention, and again it was defeated. During this session A. P. Dennison served as the Council president, with the Speaker of the House being Delazon Smith.

=== 1856 ===
Beginning on December 1, 1856, the legislature met in Salem, using rented space, remaining in session until January 29, 1857. The legislature again addressed the question of holding a constitutional convention, and during this session it passed with the citizens then voted in favor of the resolution on June 1, 1857, with a convention to be held later in the year. During the session James Kerr Kelly served as the Council president, with the Speaker of the House position held by La Fayette Grover.

=== 1857 ===
On December 7, 1857, the legislature began their session in Salem, lasting through February 5, 1858. During the session Hugh D. O'Bryant served as president of the Council chamber, with the Speaker of the House position held by Ira F. M. Butler.

=== 1858 ===
On August 17, 1857, the Oregon Constitutional Convention convened in Salem with the task of creating a constitution in order for Oregon to become a state. The Convention accomplished this task and submitted the final document to the voters of the territory for approval on November 9, 1857, when it was approved and then sent to the United States Senate for approval. Once approved by the Federal government, Oregon would become a state. However, communications between the East Coast and West Coast were still slow, and those elected as state officials had to wait for word of Oregon's admission to the Union before they could formally begin their service. The state legislators meet twice before admission, from July 6 to July 9, and September 13 & 14. They met and adjourned once there was no word on Oregon's statehood. The Territorial Legislature then met starting on December 6, 1858 for their final session. Previously in Oregon's government, the authority to dissolve a marriage was vested in the legislature, and during this final session the legislators granted 31 divorces before the authority shifted to the courts upon statehood. This session lasted until January 22, 1859, during which Charles Drain served as Council President and Nathaniel H. Gates was Speaker of the House.

== Aftermath ==
Oregon was then admitted to the Union on February 14, 1859, and the elected state officials and legislators took over governing the now state. The first session of the Oregon Legislative Assembly began on May 16, 1859, in a special session that lasted until June 4. Oregon's first regular session of the biennial legislature occurred from September 10 through October 19, 1860.
