= Political party strength in Oregon =

Politics in the US state of Oregon

The following table indicates the party of elected officials in the U.S. state of Oregon:

- Governor
- Oregon Secretary of State
- Attorney General
- State Treasurer
- Commissioner of Labor and Industries
- Superintendent of Public Instruction (before 2012)

The table also indicates the historical party composition in the:

- State Senate
- State House of Representatives
- State delegation to the U.S. Senate
- State delegation to the U.S. House of Representatives

For years in which a presidential election was held, the table indicates which party's nominees received the state's electoral votes.

== Pre-statehood (1845–1858) ==
Year	Executive offices			Provisional/Territorial Legislature		U. S. Congress
Year	Governor	Secretary of State	Treasurer	Council	House	Delegate
Provisional Government of Oregon
1845	George Abernethy (Note: Meetings at Champoeg led up to the first constitution of the Oregon Country, and several petitions for U.S. territorial status. The resulting acts also created this body as a provisional government for the region. The first executives of this government were a three-person elected committee known as the Executive Committee. In 1845, elections for a chief executive were held.)					
1846	George Abernethy					
1847	George Abernethy					
Oregon Territory
1848	Joseph Lane (D) (Note: Governor of Oregon Territory appointed by the President of the United States.)	Theophilus R. Magruder (W)	James Taylor			
1849	Joseph Lane (D)	Kintzing Prichette (D)	James Taylor	9? D	5D, 1W, 11?	Samuel Thurston (D)
1850	Kintzing Prichette (D) (Note: Acting territorial governor.)	Kintzing Prichette (D)	James Taylor	9?	5D, 1W, 11?	Samuel Thurston (D)
1850	John P. Gaines (W)	Edward D. Hamilton (W)	James Taylor	9?	5D, 1W, 11?	Samuel Thurston (D)
1851	John P. Gaines (W)	Edward D. Hamilton (W)	Levi A. Rice	4D, 5?	7D, 2W, 13?	Joseph Lane (D)
1851	John P. Gaines (W)	Edward D. Hamilton (W)	William W. Buck	4D, 5?	7D, 2W, 13?	Joseph Lane (D)
1852	John P. Gaines (W)	Edward D. Hamilton (W)	John D. Boon (D)	4D, 4W	13D, 7W, 5Fed	Joseph Lane (D)
1853	John P. Gaines (W)	Edward D. Hamilton (W)	John D. Boon (D)	8D, 1W	22D, 4W	Joseph Lane (D)
1853	Joseph Lane (D)	George Law Curry (D)	John D. Boon (D)	8D, 1W	22D, 4W	Joseph Lane (D)
1853	George Law Curry (D)	George Law Curry (D)	John D. Boon (D)	8D, 1W	22D, 4W	Joseph Lane (D)
1853	John Wesley Davis (D)	George Law Curry (D)	John D. Boon (D)	8D, 1W	22D, 4W	Joseph Lane (D)
1854	John Wesley Davis (D)	George Law Curry (D)	John D. Boon (D)	7D, 2W	23D, 6W	Joseph Lane (D)
1854	George Law Curry (D)	George Law Curry (D)	John D. Boon (D)	7D, 2W	23D, 6W	Joseph Lane (D)
1855	George Law Curry (D)	Benjamin F. Harding (D)	Nathaniel H. Lane	7D, 2W	27D, 3W	Joseph Lane (D)
1856	George Law Curry (D)	Benjamin F. Harding (D)	John D. Boon (D)	7D, 2W	23D, 3W, 4?	Joseph Lane (D)
1857	George Law Curry (D)	Benjamin F. Harding (D)	John D. Boon (D)	6D, 3W	19D, 11W	Joseph Lane (D)
1858	George Law Curry (D)	Benjamin F. Harding (D)	John D. Boon (D)	6D, 2W, 1?	27D, 6R	Joseph Lane (D)

== Statehood (1859–present) ==
Year	Executive offices						Legislative Assembly		United States Congress			Electoral votes
Year	Governor	Secretary of State	Attorney General	Treasurer	Comm. of Labor (Note: The exact title of the official chiefly responsible for enforcement of labor and related laws has varied through its existence, beginning with Labor Commissioner in 1903, becoming Commissioner of the Bureau of Labor Statistics and Inspector of Factories and Workshops in 1918, then Commissioner of the Bureau of Labor in 1930, and finally Commissioner of Labor and Industries in 1979.)	Supt. of Pub. Inst.	State Senate	State House	Senator (Class II)	Senator (Class III)	House	Electoral votes
1859	John Whiteaker (D)	Lucien Heath (D)	(Note: Office of Attorney General established by statute on May 20, 1891.)	John D. Boon (D)	(Note: Office of Labor Commissioner established by statute on June 2, 1903.)	(Note: Prior to 1872, the governor was ex officio the Superintendent of Public Instruction. The Legislative Assembly established Superintendent of Public Instruction as a separate office by statute in February 1872.)	14D, 2R	30D, 4R	Delazon Smith (D)	Joseph Lane (D)	La Fayette Grover (D)	
1859	John Whiteaker (D)	Lucien Heath (D)	(Note: Office of Attorney General established by statute on May 20, 1891.)	John D. Boon (D)	(Note: Office of Labor Commissioner established by statute on June 2, 1903.)	(Note: Prior to 1872, the governor was ex officio the Superintendent of Public Instruction. The Legislative Assembly established Superintendent of Public Instruction as a separate office by statute in February 1872.)	14D, 2R	30D, 4R	vacant (Note: Legislature failed to elected a senator.)	Joseph Lane (D)	Lansing Stout (D)	
1860	John Whiteaker (D)	Lucien Heath (D)	(Note: Office of Attorney General established by statute on May 20, 1891.)	John D. Boon (D)	(Note: Office of Labor Commissioner established by statute on June 2, 1903.)	(Note: Prior to 1872, the governor was ex officio the Superintendent of Public Instruction. The Legislative Assembly established Superintendent of Public Instruction as a separate office by statute in February 1872.)	14D, 2R	30D, 4R	vacant	Joseph Lane (D)	Lansing Stout (D)	Lincoln/ Hamlin (R) ✓
1860	John Whiteaker (D)	Lucien Heath (D)	(Note: Office of Attorney General established by statute on May 20, 1891.)	John D. Boon (D)	(Note: Office of Labor Commissioner established by statute on June 2, 1903.)	(Note: Prior to 1872, the governor was ex officio the Superintendent of Public Instruction. The Legislative Assembly established Superintendent of Public Instruction as a separate office by statute in February 1872.)	14D, 2R	30D, 4R	Edward Dickinson Baker (R) (Note: Died in office.)	Joseph Lane (D)	Lansing Stout (D)	Lincoln/ Hamlin (R) ✓
1861	John Whiteaker (D)	Lucien Heath (D)	(Note: Office of Attorney General established by statute on May 20, 1891.)	John D. Boon (D)	(Note: Office of Labor Commissioner established by statute on June 2, 1903.)	(Note: Prior to 1872, the governor was ex officio the Superintendent of Public Instruction. The Legislative Assembly established Superintendent of Public Instruction as a separate office by statute in February 1872.)	13D, 3R	24D, 10R	Edward Dickinson Baker (R)	James Nesmith (D)	Andrew J. Thayer (D) (Note: Election successfully contested by George K. Shiel July 30, 1861.)	Lincoln/ Hamlin (R) ✓
1861	John Whiteaker (D)	Lucien Heath (D)	(Note: Office of Attorney General established by statute on May 20, 1891.)	John D. Boon (D)	(Note: Office of Labor Commissioner established by statute on June 2, 1903.)	(Note: Prior to 1872, the governor was ex officio the Superintendent of Public Instruction. The Legislative Assembly established Superintendent of Public Instruction as a separate office by statute in February 1872.)	13D, 3R	24D, 10R	Benjamin Stark (D) (Note: Appointed to fill a vacancy.)	James Nesmith (D)	George K. Shiel (D)	Lincoln/ Hamlin (R) ✓
1862	John Whiteaker (D)	Lucien Heath (D)	(Note: Office of Attorney General established by statute on May 20, 1891.)	John D. Boon (D)	(Note: Office of Labor Commissioner established by statute on June 2, 1903.)	(Note: Prior to 1872, the governor was ex officio the Superintendent of Public Instruction. The Legislative Assembly established Superintendent of Public Instruction as a separate office by statute in February 1872.)	13D, 3R	24D, 10R	Benjamin Stark (D)	James Nesmith (D)	George K. Shiel (D)	Lincoln/ Hamlin (R) ✓
1862	A. C. Gibbs (R)	Samuel E. May (R)	(Note: Office of Attorney General established by statute on May 20, 1891.)	Edwin N. Cooke (R)	(Note: Office of Labor Commissioner established by statute on June 2, 1903.)	(Note: Prior to 1872, the governor was ex officio the Superintendent of Public Instruction. The Legislative Assembly established Superintendent of Public Instruction as a separate office by statute in February 1872.)	13D, 3R	24D, 10R	Benjamin F. Harding (D)	James Nesmith (D)	George K. Shiel (D)	Lincoln/ Hamlin (R) ✓
1863	A. C. Gibbs (R)	Samuel E. May (R)	(Note: Office of Attorney General established by statute on May 20, 1891.)	Edwin N. Cooke (R)	(Note: Office of Labor Commissioner established by statute on June 2, 1903.)	(Note: Prior to 1872, the governor was ex officio the Superintendent of Public Instruction. The Legislative Assembly established Superintendent of Public Instruction as a separate office by statute in February 1872.)	10R, 5D, 1I	33R, 1D	Benjamin F. Harding (D)	James Nesmith (D)	John R. McBride (R)	Lincoln/ Hamlin (R) ✓
1864	A. C. Gibbs (R)	Samuel E. May (R)	(Note: Office of Attorney General established by statute on May 20, 1891.)	Edwin N. Cooke (R)	(Note: Office of Labor Commissioner established by statute on June 2, 1903.)	(Note: Prior to 1872, the governor was ex officio the Superintendent of Public Instruction. The Legislative Assembly established Superintendent of Public Instruction as a separate office by statute in February 1872.)	10R, 5D, 1I	33R, 1D	Benjamin F. Harding (D)	James Nesmith (D)	John R. McBride (R)	Lincoln/ Johnson (NU) ✓
1865	A. C. Gibbs (R)	Samuel E. May (R)	(Note: Office of Attorney General established by statute on May 20, 1891.)	Edwin N. Cooke (R)	(Note: Office of Labor Commissioner established by statute on June 2, 1903.)	(Note: Prior to 1872, the governor was ex officio the Superintendent of Public Instruction. The Legislative Assembly established Superintendent of Public Instruction as a separate office by statute in February 1872.)	15R, 3D	33R, 5D	George Henry Williams (R)	James Nesmith (D)	James H. D. Henderson (R)	Lincoln/ Johnson (NU) ✓
1866	A. C. Gibbs (R)	Samuel E. May (R)	(Note: Office of Attorney General established by statute on May 20, 1891.)	Edwin N. Cooke (R)	(Note: Office of Labor Commissioner established by statute on June 2, 1903.)	(Note: Prior to 1872, the governor was ex officio the Superintendent of Public Instruction. The Legislative Assembly established Superintendent of Public Instruction as a separate office by statute in February 1872.)	15R, 3D	33R, 5D	George Henry Williams (R)	James Nesmith (D)	James H. D. Henderson (R)	Lincoln/ Johnson (NU) ✓
1866	George Lemuel Woods (R)	Samuel E. May (R)	(Note: Office of Attorney General established by statute on May 20, 1891.)	Edwin N. Cooke (R)	(Note: Office of Labor Commissioner established by statute on June 2, 1903.)	(Note: Prior to 1872, the governor was ex officio the Superintendent of Public Instruction. The Legislative Assembly established Superintendent of Public Instruction as a separate office by statute in February 1872.)	15R, 3D	33R, 5D	George Henry Williams (R)	James Nesmith (D)	James H. D. Henderson (R)	Lincoln/ Johnson (NU) ✓
1867	George Lemuel Woods (R)	Samuel E. May (R)	(Note: Office of Attorney General established by statute on May 20, 1891.)	Edwin N. Cooke (R)	(Note: Office of Labor Commissioner established by statute on June 2, 1903.)	(Note: Prior to 1872, the governor was ex officio the Superintendent of Public Instruction. The Legislative Assembly established Superintendent of Public Instruction as a separate office by statute in February 1872.)	17R, 7D, 1I	24R, 23D	George Henry Williams (R)	Henry W. Corbett (R)	Rufus Mallory (R)	Lincoln/ Johnson (NU) ✓
1868	George Lemuel Woods (R)	Samuel E. May (R)	(Note: Office of Attorney General established by statute on May 20, 1891.)	Edwin N. Cooke (R)	(Note: Office of Labor Commissioner established by statute on June 2, 1903.)	(Note: Prior to 1872, the governor was ex officio the Superintendent of Public Instruction. The Legislative Assembly established Superintendent of Public Instruction as a separate office by statute in February 1872.)	17R, 7D, 1I	24R, 23D	George Henry Williams (R)	Henry W. Corbett (R)	Rufus Mallory (R)	Seymour/ Blair (D) ✗
1869	George Lemuel Woods (R)	Samuel E. May (R)	(Note: Office of Attorney General established by statute on May 20, 1891.)	Edwin N. Cooke (R)	(Note: Office of Labor Commissioner established by statute on June 2, 1903.)	(Note: Prior to 1872, the governor was ex officio the Superintendent of Public Instruction. The Legislative Assembly established Superintendent of Public Instruction as a separate office by statute in February 1872.)	12D, 10R	25D, 18R	George Henry Williams (R)	Henry W. Corbett (R)	Joseph Showalter; Smith (D)	Seymour/ Blair (D) ✗
1870	George Lemuel Woods (R)	Samuel E. May (R)	(Note: Office of Attorney General established by statute on May 20, 1891.)	Edwin N. Cooke (R)	(Note: Office of Labor Commissioner established by statute on June 2, 1903.)	(Note: Prior to 1872, the governor was ex officio the Superintendent of Public Instruction. The Legislative Assembly established Superintendent of Public Instruction as a separate office by statute in February 1872.)	12D, 10R	25D, 18R	George Henry Williams (R)	Henry W. Corbett (R)	Joseph Showalter; Smith (D)	Seymour/ Blair (D) ✗
1870	La Fayette Grover (D) (Note: Resigned.)	Stephen F. Chadwick (D)	(Note: Office of Attorney General established by statute on May 20, 1891.)	L. Fleischner (D)	(Note: Office of Labor Commissioner established by statute on June 2, 1903.)	(Note: Prior to 1872, the governor was ex officio the Superintendent of Public Instruction. The Legislative Assembly established Superintendent of Public Instruction as a separate office by statute in February 1872.)	12D, 10R	25D, 18R	George Henry Williams (R)	Henry W. Corbett (R)	Joseph Showalter; Smith (D)	Seymour/ Blair (D) ✗
1871	La Fayette Grover (D)	Stephen F. Chadwick (D)	(Note: Office of Attorney General established by statute on May 20, 1891.)	L. Fleischner (D)	(Note: Office of Labor Commissioner established by statute on June 2, 1903.)	(Note: Prior to 1872, the governor was ex officio the Superintendent of Public Instruction. The Legislative Assembly established Superintendent of Public Instruction as a separate office by statute in February 1872.)	13D, 9R	28D, 19R	James K. Kelly (D)	Henry W. Corbett (R)	James H. Slater (D)	Seymour/ Blair (D) ✗
1872	La Fayette Grover (D)	Stephen F. Chadwick (D)	(Note: Office of Attorney General established by statute on May 20, 1891.)	L. Fleischner (D)	(Note: Office of Labor Commissioner established by statute on June 2, 1903.)	Sylvester C. Simpson (D)	13D, 9R	28D, 19R	James K. Kelly (D)	Henry W. Corbett (R)	James H. Slater (D)	Grant/ Wilson (R) ✓
1873	La Fayette Grover (D)	Stephen F. Chadwick (D)	(Note: Office of Attorney General established by statute on May 20, 1891.)	L. Fleischner (D)	(Note: Office of Labor Commissioner established by statute on June 2, 1903.)	Sylvester C. Simpson (D)	13R, 9D	32R, 17D	James K. Kelly (D)	John H. Mitchell (R)	Joseph G. Wilson (R)	Grant/ Wilson (R) ✓
1874	La Fayette Grover (D)	Stephen F. Chadwick (D)	(Note: Office of Attorney General established by statute on May 20, 1891.)	L. Fleischner (D)	(Note: Office of Labor Commissioner established by statute on June 2, 1903.)	Sylvester C. Simpson (D)	13R, 9D	32R, 17D	James K. Kelly (D)	John H. Mitchell (R)	James Nesmith (D)	Grant/ Wilson (R) ✓
1874	La Fayette Grover (D)	Stephen F. Chadwick (D)	(Note: Office of Attorney General established by statute on May 20, 1891.)	A. H. Brown (D)	(Note: Office of Labor Commissioner established by statute on June 2, 1903.)	Levi L. Rowland (R)	13R, 9D	32R, 17D	James K. Kelly (D)	John H. Mitchell (R)	James Nesmith (D)	Grant/ Wilson (R) ✓
1875	La Fayette Grover (D)	Stephen F. Chadwick (D)	(Note: Office of Attorney General established by statute on May 20, 1891.)	A. H. Brown (D)	(Note: Office of Labor Commissioner established by statute on June 2, 1903.)	Levi L. Rowland (R)	18D, 11R, 1I	23I, 20D, 17R (Note: A Democrat-turned-Independent, John C. Drain, was elected Speaker, and the Independents organized the chamber with the help of Democrats.)	James K. Kelly (D)	John H. Mitchell (R)	George A. La Dow (D)	Grant/ Wilson (R) ✓
1876	La Fayette Grover (D)	Stephen F. Chadwick (D)	(Note: Office of Attorney General established by statute on May 20, 1891.)	A. H. Brown (D)	(Note: Office of Labor Commissioner established by statute on June 2, 1903.)	Levi L. Rowland (R)	18D, 11R, 1I	23I, 20D, 17R	James K. Kelly (D)	John H. Mitchell (R)	Lafayette Lane (D)	Hayes/ Wheeler (R) ✓
1877	Stephen F. Chadwick (D) (Note: Assumed office following the death or resignation of predecessor.)	Stephen F. Chadwick (D)	(Note: Office of Attorney General established by statute on May 20, 1891.)	A. H. Brown (D)	(Note: Office of Labor Commissioner established by statute on June 2, 1903.)	Levi L. Rowland (R)	18D, 10R, 2I	30R, 27D, 3I (Note: A Democrat, James Knox Weatherford, was elected Speaker, and the Democrats organized the chamber with the help of Independents and renegade Republicans.)	La Fayette Grover (D)	John H. Mitchell (R)	Richard Williams (R)	Hayes/ Wheeler (R) ✓
1878	Stephen F. Chadwick (D)	Stephen F. Chadwick (D)	(Note: Office of Attorney General established by statute on May 20, 1891.)	A. H. Brown (D)	(Note: Office of Labor Commissioner established by statute on June 2, 1903.)	Levi L. Rowland (R)	18D, 10R, 2I	30R, 27D, 3I	La Fayette Grover (D)	John H. Mitchell (R)	Richard Williams (R)	Hayes/ Wheeler (R) ✓
1878	W. W. Thayer (D)	Rockey P. Earhart (R)	(Note: Office of Attorney General established by statute on May 20, 1891.)	Edward Hirsch (R)	(Note: Office of Labor Commissioner established by statute on June 2, 1903.)	Leonard J. Powell (R)	18D, 10R, 2I	30R, 27D, 3I	La Fayette Grover (D)	John H. Mitchell (R)	Richard Williams (R)	Hayes/ Wheeler (R) ✓
1879	W. W. Thayer (D)	Rockey P. Earhart (R)	(Note: Office of Attorney General established by statute on May 20, 1891.)	Edward Hirsch (R)	(Note: Office of Labor Commissioner established by statute on June 2, 1903.)	Leonard J. Powell (R)	18D, 10R, 2I	30D, 28R, 2I (Note: A Democrat, John M. Thompson, was elected Speaker, and the Democrats organized the chamber with the help of Independents.)	La Fayette Grover (D)	James H. Slater (D)	John Whiteaker (D)	Hayes/ Wheeler (R) ✓
1880	W. W. Thayer (D)	Rockey P. Earhart (R)	(Note: Office of Attorney General established by statute on May 20, 1891.)	Edward Hirsch (R)	(Note: Office of Labor Commissioner established by statute on June 2, 1903.)	Leonard J. Powell (R)	18D, 10R, 2I	30D, 28R, 2I	La Fayette Grover (D)	James H. Slater (D)	John Whiteaker (D)	Garfield/ Arthur (R) ✓
1881	W. W. Thayer (D)	Rockey P. Earhart (R)	(Note: Office of Attorney General established by statute on May 20, 1891.)	Edward Hirsch (R)	(Note: Office of Labor Commissioner established by statute on June 2, 1903.)	Leonard J. Powell (R)	16R, 14D	40R, 20D	La Fayette Grover (D)	James H. Slater (D)	Melvin Clark George (R)	Garfield/ Arthur (R) ✓
1882	W. W. Thayer (D)	Rockey P. Earhart (R)	(Note: Office of Attorney General established by statute on May 20, 1891.)	Edward Hirsch (R)	(Note: Office of Labor Commissioner established by statute on June 2, 1903.)	Leonard J. Powell (R)	16R, 14D	40R, 20D	La Fayette Grover (D)	James H. Slater (D)	Melvin Clark George (R)	Garfield/ Arthur (R) ✓
1882	Zenas Ferry Moody (R)	Rockey P. Earhart (R)	(Note: Office of Attorney General established by statute on May 20, 1891.)	Edward Hirsch (R)	(Note: Office of Labor Commissioner established by statute on June 2, 1903.)	Ebenezer B. McElroy (R)	16R, 14D	40R, 20D	La Fayette Grover (D)	James H. Slater (D)	Melvin Clark George (R)	Garfield/ Arthur (R) ✓
1883	Zenas Ferry Moody (R)	Rockey P. Earhart (R)	(Note: Office of Attorney General established by statute on May 20, 1891.)	Edward Hirsch (R)	(Note: Office of Labor Commissioner established by statute on June 2, 1903.)	Ebenezer B. McElroy (R)	16R, 14D	37R, 21D, 2I	Joseph N. Dolph (R)	James H. Slater (D)	Melvin Clark George (R)	Garfield/ Arthur (R) ✓
1884	Zenas Ferry Moody (R)	Rockey P. Earhart (R)	(Note: Office of Attorney General established by statute on May 20, 1891.)	Edward Hirsch (R)	(Note: Office of Labor Commissioner established by statute on June 2, 1903.)	Ebenezer B. McElroy (R)	16R, 14D	37R, 21D, 2I	Joseph N. Dolph (R)	James H. Slater (D)	Melvin Clark George (R)	Blaine/ Logan (R) ✗
1885	Zenas Ferry Moody (R)	Rockey P. Earhart (R)	(Note: Office of Attorney General established by statute on May 20, 1891.)	Edward Hirsch (R)	(Note: Office of Labor Commissioner established by statute on June 2, 1903.)	Ebenezer B. McElroy (R)	17R, 13D	35R, 25D	Joseph N. Dolph (R)	vacant	Binger Hermann (R)	Blaine/ Logan (R) ✗
1885	Zenas Ferry Moody (R)	Rockey P. Earhart (R)	(Note: Office of Attorney General established by statute on May 20, 1891.)	Edward Hirsch (R)	(Note: Office of Labor Commissioner established by statute on June 2, 1903.)	Ebenezer B. McElroy (R)	17R, 13D	35R, 25D	Joseph N. Dolph (R)	John H. Mitchell (R)	Binger Hermann (R)	Blaine/ Logan (R) ✗
1886	Zenas Ferry Moody (R)	Rockey P. Earhart (R)	(Note: Office of Attorney General established by statute on May 20, 1891.)	Edward Hirsch (R)	(Note: Office of Labor Commissioner established by statute on June 2, 1903.)	Ebenezer B. McElroy (R)	17R, 13D	35R, 25D	Joseph N. Dolph (R)	John H. Mitchell (R)	Binger Hermann (R)	Blaine/ Logan (R) ✗
1887	Sylvester Pennoyer (Fus) (Note: Elected on a Democratic–Populist fusion ticket.)	George W. McBride (R)	(Note: Office of Attorney General established by statute on May 20, 1891.)	G. W. Webb (D)	(Note: Office of Labor Commissioner established by statute on June 2, 1903.)	Ebenezer B. McElroy (R)	19R, 11D	34R, 26D	Joseph N. Dolph (R)	John H. Mitchell (R)	Binger Hermann (R)	Blaine/ Logan (R) ✗
1888	Sylvester Pennoyer (Fus)	George W. McBride (R)	(Note: Office of Attorney General established by statute on May 20, 1891.)	G. W. Webb (D)	(Note: Office of Labor Commissioner established by statute on June 2, 1903.)	Ebenezer B. McElroy (R)	19R, 11D	34R, 26D	Joseph N. Dolph (R)	John H. Mitchell (R)	Binger Hermann (R)	Harrison/ Morton (R) ✓
1889	Sylvester Pennoyer (Fus)	George W. McBride (R)	(Note: Office of Attorney General established by statute on May 20, 1891.)	G. W. Webb (D)	(Note: Office of Labor Commissioner established by statute on June 2, 1903.)	Ebenezer B. McElroy (R)	21R, 9D	51R, 9D	Joseph N. Dolph (R)	John H. Mitchell (R)	Binger Hermann (R)	Harrison/ Morton (R) ✓
1890	Sylvester Pennoyer (Fus)	George W. McBride (R)	(Note: Office of Attorney General established by statute on May 20, 1891.)	G. W. Webb (D)	(Note: Office of Labor Commissioner established by statute on June 2, 1903.)	Ebenezer B. McElroy (R)	21R, 9D	51R, 9D	Joseph N. Dolph (R)	John H. Mitchell (R)	Binger Hermann (R)	Harrison/ Morton (R) ✓
1891	Sylvester Pennoyer (Fus)	George W. McBride (R)	Phil Metschan (R)	G. W. Webb (D)	(Note: Office of Labor Commissioner established by statute on June 2, 1903.)	Ebenezer B. McElroy (R)	23R, 7D	43R, 17D	Joseph N. Dolph (R)	John H. Mitchell (R)	Binger Hermann (R)	Harrison/ Morton (R) ✓
1891	Sylvester Pennoyer (Fus)	George W. McBride (R)	Phil Metschan (R)	George E. Chamberlain (D) (Note: Appointed to fill a vacancy, and subsequently elected in his or her own right.)	(Note: Office of Labor Commissioner established by statute on June 2, 1903.)	Ebenezer B. McElroy (R)	23R, 7D	43R, 17D	Joseph N. Dolph (R)	John H. Mitchell (R)	Binger Hermann (R)	Harrison/ Morton (R) ✓
1892	Sylvester Pennoyer (Fus)	George W. McBride (R)	Phil Metschan (R)	George E. Chamberlain (D)	(Note: Office of Labor Commissioner established by statute on June 2, 1903.)	Ebenezer B. McElroy (R)	23R, 7D	43R, 17D	Joseph N. Dolph (R)	John H. Mitchell (R)	Binger Hermann (R)	Harrison/ Reid (R) ✗
1893	Sylvester Pennoyer (Fus)	George W. McBride (R)	Phil Metschan (R)	George E. Chamberlain (D)	(Note: Office of Labor Commissioner established by statute on June 2, 1903.)	Ebenezer B. McElroy (R)	16R, 13D, 1Pop	38R, 19D, 3Pop	Joseph N. Dolph (R)	John H. Mitchell (R)	2R	Harrison/ Reid (R) ✗
1894	Sylvester Pennoyer (Fus)	George W. McBride (R)	Phil Metschan (R)	George E. Chamberlain (D)	(Note: Office of Labor Commissioner established by statute on June 2, 1903.)	Ebenezer B. McElroy (R)	16R, 13D, 1Pop	38R, 19D, 3Pop	Joseph N. Dolph (R)	John H. Mitchell (R)	2R	Harrison/ Reid (R) ✗
1895	William Paine Lord (R)	Harrison R. Kincaid (R)	Phil Metschan (R)	Cicero M. Idleman (R)	(Note: Office of Labor Commissioner established by statute on June 2, 1903.)	George M. Irwin (R)	19R, 8D, 3Pop	53R, 7Pop	George W. McBride (R)	John H. Mitchell (R)	2R	Harrison/ Reid (R) ✗
1896	William Paine Lord (R)	Harrison R. Kincaid (R)	Phil Metschan (R)	Cicero M. Idleman (R)	(Note: Office of Labor Commissioner established by statute on June 2, 1903.)	George M. Irwin (R)	19R, 8D, 3Pop	53R, 7Pop	George W. McBride (R)	John H. Mitchell (R)	2R	McKinley/ Hobart (R) ✓
1897	William Paine Lord (R)	Harrison R. Kincaid (R)	Phil Metschan (R)	Cicero M. Idleman (R)	(Note: Office of Labor Commissioner established by statute on June 2, 1903.)	George M. Irwin (R)	24R, 3D, 3Pop (Note: Due to splits between factions of the Republican Party, the Legislative Assembly did not organize for this session.)	39R, 17Pop, 4D	George W. McBride (R)	vacant	2R	McKinley/ Hobart (R) ✓
1898	William Paine Lord (R)	Harrison R. Kincaid (R)	Phil Metschan (R)	Cicero M. Idleman (R)	(Note: Office of Labor Commissioner established by statute on June 2, 1903.)	George M. Irwin (R)	24R, 3D, 3Pop	39R, 17Pop, 4D	George W. McBride (R)	vacant	2R	McKinley/ Hobart (R) ✓
1898	William Paine Lord (R)	Harrison R. Kincaid (R)	Phil Metschan (R)	Cicero M. Idleman (R)	(Note: Office of Labor Commissioner established by statute on June 2, 1903.)	George M. Irwin (R)	24R, 3D, 3Pop	39R, 17Pop, 4D	George W. McBride (R)	Joseph Simon (R)	2R	McKinley/ Hobart (R) ✓
1899	Theodore Thurston Geer (R)	Frank L. Dunbar (R)	D. R. N. Blackburn (R)	Charles S. Moore (R)	(Note: Office of Labor Commissioner established by statute on June 2, 1903.)	John H. Ackerman (R)	24R, 3D, 3Pop	42R, 17Pop, 1D	George W. McBride (R)	Joseph Simon (R)	2R	McKinley/ Hobart (R) ✓
1900	Theodore Thurston Geer (R)	Frank L. Dunbar (R)	D. R. N. Blackburn (R)	Charles S. Moore (R)	(Note: Office of Labor Commissioner established by statute on June 2, 1903.)	John H. Ackerman (R)	24R, 3D, 3Pop	42R, 17Pop, 1D	George W. McBride (R)	Joseph Simon (R)	2R	McKinley/ Roosevelt (R) ✓
1901	Theodore Thurston Geer (R)	Frank L. Dunbar (R)	D. R. N. Blackburn (R)	Charles S. Moore (R)	(Note: Office of Labor Commissioner established by statute on June 2, 1903.)	John H. Ackerman (R)	21R, 4Cit, 3P, 1D, 1Un	35R, 13Cit, 7D, 3Un, 1P, 1 vac.	John H. Mitchell (R)	Joseph Simon (R)	2R	McKinley/ Roosevelt (R) ✓
1902	Theodore Thurston Geer (R)	Frank L. Dunbar (R)	D. R. N. Blackburn (R)	Charles S. Moore (R)	(Note: Office of Labor Commissioner established by statute on June 2, 1903.)	John H. Ackerman (R)	21R, 4Cit, 3P, 1D, 1Un	35R, 13Cit, 7D, 3Un, 1P, 1 vac.	John H. Mitchell (R)	Joseph Simon (R)	2R	McKinley/ Roosevelt (R) ✓
1903	George E. Chamberlain (D)	Frank L. Dunbar (R)	Andrew M. Crawford (R)	Charles S. Moore (R)	(Note: Office of Labor Commissioner established by statute on June 2, 1903.)	John H. Ackerman (R)	21R, 3D, 3Cit, 2Un, 1Pop	48R, 11D, 1Cit	John H. Mitchell (R)	Charles W. Fulton (R)	2R	McKinley/ Roosevelt (R) ✓
1903	George E. Chamberlain (D)	Frank L. Dunbar (R)	Andrew M. Crawford (R)	Charles S. Moore (R)	O. P. Hoff (R)	John H. Ackerman (R)	21R, 3D, 3Cit, 2Un, 1Pop	48R, 11D, 1Cit	John H. Mitchell (R)	Charles W. Fulton (R)	2R	McKinley/ Roosevelt (R) ✓
1904	George E. Chamberlain (D)	Frank L. Dunbar (R)	Andrew M. Crawford (R)	Charles S. Moore (R)	O. P. Hoff (R)	John H. Ackerman (R)	21R, 3D, 3Cit, 2Un, 1Pop	48R, 11D, 1Cit	John H. Mitchell (R)	Charles W. Fulton (R)	2R	Roosevelt/ Fairbanks (R) ✓
1905	George E. Chamberlain (D)	Frank L. Dunbar (R)	Andrew M. Crawford (R)	Charles S. Moore (R)	O. P. Hoff (R)	John H. Ackerman (R)	25R, 5D	50R, 10D	John H. Mitchell (R)	Charles W. Fulton (R)	2R	Roosevelt/ Fairbanks (R) ✓
1906	George E. Chamberlain (D)	Frank L. Dunbar (R)	Andrew M. Crawford (R)	Charles S. Moore (R)	O. P. Hoff (R)	John H. Ackerman (R)	25R, 5D	50R, 10D	John M. Gearin (D)	Charles W. Fulton (R)	2R	Roosevelt/ Fairbanks (R) ✓
1907	George E. Chamberlain (D)	Frank W. Benson (R)	Andrew M. Crawford (R)	George A. Steel (R)	O. P. Hoff (R)	John H. Ackerman (R)	24R, 6D	59R, 1D	Frederick W. Mulkey (R)	Charles W. Fulton (R)	2R	Roosevelt/ Fairbanks (R) ✓
1907	George E. Chamberlain (D)	Frank W. Benson (R)	Andrew M. Crawford (R)	George A. Steel (R)	O. P. Hoff (R)	John H. Ackerman (R)	24R, 6D	59R, 1D	Jonathan Bourne Jr. (R)	Charles W. Fulton (R)	2R	Roosevelt/ Fairbanks (R) ✓
1908	George E. Chamberlain (D)	Frank W. Benson (R)	Andrew M. Crawford (R)	George A. Steel (R)	O. P. Hoff (R)	John H. Ackerman (R)	24R, 6D	59R, 1D	Jonathan Bourne Jr. (R)	Charles W. Fulton (R)	2R	Taft/ Sherman (R) ✓
1909	Frank W. Benson (R)	Frank W. Benson (R)	Andrew M. Crawford (R)	George A. Steel (R)	O. P. Hoff (R)	John H. Ackerman (R)	24R, 6D	53R, 7D	Jonathan Bourne Jr. (R)	George E. Chamberlain (D)	2R	Taft/ Sherman (R) ✓
1910	Frank W. Benson (R)	Frank W. Benson (R)	Andrew M. Crawford (R)	George A. Steel (R)	O. P. Hoff (R)	John H. Ackerman (R)	24R, 6D	53R, 7D	Jonathan Bourne Jr. (R)	George E. Chamberlain (D)	2R	Taft/ Sherman (R) ✓
1910	Jay Bowerman (R)	Frank W. Benson (R)	Andrew M. Crawford (R)	George A. Steel (R)	O. P. Hoff (R)	John H. Ackerman (R)	24R, 6D	53R, 7D	Jonathan Bourne Jr. (R)	George E. Chamberlain (D)	2R	Taft/ Sherman (R) ✓
1911	Oswald West (D)	Frank W. Benson (R)	Andrew M. Crawford (R)	Thomas B. Kay (R)	O. P. Hoff (R)	Lewis R. Alderman (R)	27R, 3D	58R, 2D	Jonathan Bourne Jr. (R)	George E. Chamberlain (D)	2R	Taft/ Sherman (R) ✓
1911	Oswald West (D)	Ben W. Olcott (R) (Note: Resigned as lieutenant governor on May 28, 1920, after assuming the governorship in 1919.)	Andrew M. Crawford (R)	Thomas B. Kay (R)	O. P. Hoff (R)	Lewis R. Alderman (R)	27R, 3D	58R, 2D	Jonathan Bourne Jr. (R)	George E. Chamberlain (D)	2R	Taft/ Sherman (R) ✓
1912	Oswald West (D)	Ben W. Olcott (R)	Andrew M. Crawford (R)	Thomas B. Kay (R)	O. P. Hoff (R)	Lewis R. Alderman (R)	27R, 3D	58R, 2D	Jonathan Bourne Jr. (R)	George E. Chamberlain (D)	2R	Wilson/ Marshall (D) ✓
1913	Oswald West (D)	Ben W. Olcott (R)	Andrew M. Crawford (R)	Thomas B. Kay (R)	O. P. Hoff (R)	Lewis R. Alderman (R)	28R, 2D	48R, 7Prog, 5D	Harry Lane (D)	George E. Chamberlain (D)	3R	Wilson/ Marshall (D) ✓
1913	Oswald West (D)	Ben W. Olcott (R)	Andrew M. Crawford (R)	Thomas B. Kay (R)	O. P. Hoff (R)	Julius A. Churchill (R)	28R, 2D	48R, 7Prog, 5D	Harry Lane (D)	George E. Chamberlain (D)	3R	Wilson/ Marshall (D) ✓
1914	Oswald West (D)	Ben W. Olcott (R)	Andrew M. Crawford (R)	Thomas B. Kay (R)	O. P. Hoff (R)	Julius A. Churchill (R)	28R, 2D	48R, 7Prog, 5D	Harry Lane (D)	George E. Chamberlain (D)	3R	Wilson/ Marshall (D) ✓
1915	James Withycombe (R)	Ben W. Olcott (R)	George M. Brown (R)	Thomas B. Kay (R)	O. P. Hoff (R)	Julius A. Churchill (R)	28R, 2D	56R, 4D	Harry Lane (D)	George E. Chamberlain (D)	3R	Wilson/ Marshall (D) ✓
1916	James Withycombe (R)	Ben W. Olcott (R)	George M. Brown (R)	Thomas B. Kay (R)	O. P. Hoff (R)	Julius A. Churchill (R)	28R, 2D	56R, 4D	Harry Lane (D)	George E. Chamberlain (D)	3R	Hughes/ Fairbanks (R) ✗
1917	James Withycombe (R)	Ben W. Olcott (R)	George M. Brown (R)	Thomas B. Kay (R)	O. P. Hoff (R)	Julius A. Churchill (R)	24R, 5D, 1I	55R, 4D, 1I	Harry Lane (D)	George E. Chamberlain (D)	3R	Hughes/ Fairbanks (R) ✗
1917	James Withycombe (R)	Ben W. Olcott (R)	George M. Brown (R)	Thomas B. Kay (R)	O. P. Hoff (R)	Julius A. Churchill (R)	24R, 5D, 1I	55R, 4D, 1I	Charles L. McNary (R)	George E. Chamberlain (D)	3R	Hughes/ Fairbanks (R) ✗
1918	James Withycombe (R)	Ben W. Olcott (R)	George M. Brown (R)	Thomas B. Kay (R)	O. P. Hoff (R)	Julius A. Churchill (R)	24R, 5D, 1I	55R, 4D, 1I	Charles L. McNary (R)	George E. Chamberlain (D)	3R	Hughes/ Fairbanks (R) ✗
1918	James Withycombe (R)	Ben W. Olcott (R)	George M. Brown (R)	Thomas B. Kay (R)	O. P. Hoff (R)	Julius A. Churchill (R)	24R, 5D, 1I	55R, 4D, 1I	Frederick W. Mulkey (R)	George E. Chamberlain (D)	3R	Hughes/ Fairbanks (R) ✗
1919	James Withycombe (R)	Ben W. Olcott (R)	George M. Brown (R)	O. P. Hoff (R)	C. H. Gram (R)	Julius A. Churchill (R)	24R, 3D, 3I	54R, 6D	Charles L. McNary (R) (Note: Appointed to office, having already been elected to the next term.)	George E. Chamberlain (D)	3R	Hughes/ Fairbanks (R) ✗
1919	Ben W. Olcott (R)	Ben W. Olcott (R)	George M. Brown (R)	O. P. Hoff (R)	C. H. Gram (R)	Julius A. Churchill (R)	24R, 3D, 3I	54R, 6D	Charles L. McNary (R)	George E. Chamberlain (D)	3R	Hughes/ Fairbanks (R) ✗
1920	Ben W. Olcott (R)	Ben W. Olcott (R)	George M. Brown (R)	O. P. Hoff (R)	C. H. Gram (R)	Julius A. Churchill (R)	24R, 3D, 3I	54R, 6D	Charles L. McNary (R)	George E. Chamberlain (D)	3R	Harding/ Coolidge (R) ✓
1920	Ben W. Olcott (R)	Sam A. Kozer (R)	Isaac H. Van Winkle (R)	O. P. Hoff (R)	C. H. Gram (R)	Julius A. Churchill (R)	24R, 3D, 3I	54R, 6D	Charles L. McNary (R)	George E. Chamberlain (D)	3R	Harding/ Coolidge (R) ✓
1921	Ben W. Olcott (R)	Sam A. Kozer (R)	Isaac H. Van Winkle (R)	O. P. Hoff (R)	C. H. Gram (R)	Julius A. Churchill (R)	27R, 2I, 1D	58R, 2D	Charles L. McNary (R)	Robert N. Stanfield (R)	3R	Harding/ Coolidge (R) ✓
1922	Ben W. Olcott (R)	Sam A. Kozer (R)	Isaac H. Van Winkle (R)	O. P. Hoff (R)	C. H. Gram (R)	Julius A. Churchill (R)	27R, 2I, 1D	58R, 2D	Charles L. McNary (R)	Robert N. Stanfield (R)	3R	Harding/ Coolidge (R) ✓
1923	Walter M. Pierce (D)	Sam A. Kozer (R)	Isaac H. Van Winkle (R)	O. P. Hoff (R)	C. H. Gram (R)	Julius A. Churchill (R)	26R, 4D	51R, 9D	Charles L. McNary (R)	Robert N. Stanfield (R)	2R, 1D	Harding/ Coolidge (R) ✓
1924	Walter M. Pierce (D)	Sam A. Kozer (R)	Isaac H. Van Winkle (R)	O. P. Hoff (R)	C. H. Gram (R)	Julius A. Churchill (R)	26R, 4D	51R, 9D	Charles L. McNary (R)	Robert N. Stanfield (R)	2R, 1D	Coolidge/ Dawes (R) ✓
1924	Walter M. Pierce (D)	Sam A. Kozer (R)	Isaac H. Van Winkle (R)	Jefferson Myers (D)	C. H. Gram (R)	Julius A. Churchill (R)	26R, 4D	51R, 9D	Charles L. McNary (R)	Robert N. Stanfield (R)	2R, 1D	Coolidge/ Dawes (R) ✓
1925	Walter M. Pierce (D)	Sam A. Kozer (R)	Isaac H. Van Winkle (R)	Thomas B. Kay (R)	C. H. Gram (R)	Julius A. Churchill (R)	26R, 4D	57R, 3D	Charles L. McNary (R)	Robert N. Stanfield (R)	3R	Coolidge/ Dawes (R) ✓
1926	Walter M. Pierce (D)	Sam A. Kozer (R)	Isaac H. Van Winkle (R)	Thomas B. Kay (R)	C. H. Gram (R)	Julius A. Churchill (R)	26R, 4D	57R, 3D	Charles L. McNary (R)	Robert N. Stanfield (R)	3R	Coolidge/ Dawes (R) ✓
1926	Walter M. Pierce (D)	Sam A. Kozer (R)	Isaac H. Van Winkle (R)	Thomas B. Kay (R)	C. H. Gram (R)	Richard R. Turner (D)	26R, 4D	57R, 3D	Charles L. McNary (R)	Robert N. Stanfield (R)	3R	Coolidge/ Dawes (R) ✓
1927	I. L. Patterson (R)	Sam A. Kozer (R)	Isaac H. Van Winkle (R)	Thomas B. Kay (R)	C. H. Gram (R)	Charles A. Howard (R)	27R, 3D	56R, 4D	Charles L. McNary (R)	Frederick Steiwer (R)	3R	Coolidge/ Dawes (R) ✓
1928	I. L. Patterson (R)	Sam A. Kozer (R)	Isaac H. Van Winkle (R)	Thomas B. Kay (R)	C. H. Gram (R)	Charles A. Howard (R)	27R, 3D	56R, 4D	Charles L. McNary (R)	Frederick Steiwer (R)	3R	Hoover/ Curtis (R) ✓
1928	I. L. Patterson (R)	Hal E. Hoss (R)	Isaac H. Van Winkle (R)	Thomas B. Kay (R)	C. H. Gram (R)	Charles A. Howard (R)	27R, 3D	56R, 4D	Charles L. McNary (R)	Frederick Steiwer (R)	3R	Hoover/ Curtis (R) ✓
1929	I. L. Patterson (R)	Hal E. Hoss (R)	Isaac H. Van Winkle (R)	Thomas B. Kay (R)	C. H. Gram (R)	Charles A. Howard (R)	28R, 2D	58R, 2D	Charles L. McNary (R)	Frederick Steiwer (R)	3R	Hoover/ Curtis (R) ✓
1930	A. W. Norblad (R)	Hal E. Hoss (R)	Isaac H. Van Winkle (R)	Thomas B. Kay (R)	C. H. Gram (R)	Charles A. Howard (R)	28R, 2D	58R, 2D	Charles L. McNary (R)	Frederick Steiwer (R)	3R	Hoover/ Curtis (R) ✓
1931	Julius Meier (I)	Hal E. Hoss (R)	Isaac H. Van Winkle (R)	Thomas B. Kay (R)	C. H. Gram (R)	Charles A. Howard (R)	29R, 1D	53R, 7D	Charles L. McNary (R)	Frederick Steiwer (R)	2R, 1D	Hoover/ Curtis (R) ✓
1931	Julius Meier (I)	Hal E. Hoss (R)	Isaac H. Van Winkle (R)	Rufus C. Holman (R)	C. H. Gram (R)	Charles A. Howard (R)	29R, 1D	53R, 7D	Charles L. McNary (R)	Frederick Steiwer (R)	2R, 1D	Hoover/ Curtis (R) ✓
1932	Julius Meier (I)	Hal E. Hoss (R)	Isaac H. Van Winkle (R)	Rufus C. Holman (R)	C. H. Gram (R)	Charles A. Howard (R)	29R, 1D	53R, 7D	Charles L. McNary (R)	Frederick Steiwer (R)	2R, 1D	Roosevelt/ Garner (D) ✓
1933	Julius Meier (I)	Hal E. Hoss (R)	Isaac H. Van Winkle (R)	Rufus C. Holman (R)	C. H. Gram (R)	Charles A. Howard (R)	22R, 8D	42R, 17D, 1I	Charles L. McNary (R)	Frederick Steiwer (R)	2D, 1R	Roosevelt/ Garner (D) ✓
1934	Julius Meier (I)	Peter J. Stadelman (R)	Isaac H. Van Winkle (R)	Rufus C. Holman (R)	C. H. Gram (R)	Charles A. Howard (R)	22R, 8D	42R, 17D, 1I	Charles L. McNary (R)	Frederick Steiwer (R)	2D, 1R	Roosevelt/ Garner (D) ✓
1935	Charles Martin (D)	Earl Snell (R)	Isaac H. Van Winkle (R)	Rufus C. Holman (R)	C. H. Gram (R)	Charles A. Howard (R)	17R, 13D	38D, 22R	Charles L. McNary (R)	Frederick Steiwer (R)	2R, 1D	Roosevelt/ Garner (D) ✓
1936	Charles Martin (D)	Earl Snell (R)	Isaac H. Van Winkle (R)	Rufus C. Holman (R)	C. H. Gram (R)	Charles A. Howard (R)	17R, 13D	38D, 22R	Charles L. McNary (R)	Frederick Steiwer (R)	2R, 1D	Roosevelt/ Garner (D) ✓
1937	Charles Martin (D)	Earl Snell (R)	Isaac H. Van Winkle (R)	Rufus C. Holman (R)	C. H. Gram (R)	Charles A. Howard (R)	18R, 12D	38D, 21R, 1I	Charles L. McNary (R)	Frederick Steiwer (R)	2D, 1R	Roosevelt/ Garner (D) ✓
1937	Charles Martin (D)	Earl Snell (R)	Isaac H. Van Winkle (R)	Rufus C. Holman (R)	C. H. Gram (R)	Rex Putnam (D)	18R, 12D	38D, 21R, 1I	Charles L. McNary (R)	Frederick Steiwer (R)	2D, 1R	Roosevelt/ Garner (D) ✓
1938	Charles Martin (D)	Earl Snell (R)	Isaac H. Van Winkle (R)	Rufus C. Holman (R)	C. H. Gram (R)	Rex Putnam (D)	18R, 12D	38D, 21R, 1I	Charles L. McNary (R)	Frederick Steiwer (R)	2D, 1R	Roosevelt/ Garner (D) ✓
1938	Charles Martin (D)	Earl Snell (R)	Isaac H. Van Winkle (R)	Rufus C. Holman (R)	C. H. Gram (R)	Rex Putnam (D)	18R, 12D	38D, 21R, 1I	Charles L. McNary (R)	Alfred E. Reames (D)	2D, 1R	Roosevelt/ Garner (D) ✓
1938	Charles Martin (D)	Earl Snell (R)	Isaac H. Van Winkle (R)	Rufus C. Holman (R)	C. H. Gram (R)	Rex Putnam (D)	18R, 12D	38D, 21R, 1I	Charles L. McNary (R)	Alexander G. Barry (R)	2D, 1R	Roosevelt/ Garner (D) ✓
1939	Charles A. Sprague (R)	Earl Snell (R)	Isaac H. Van Winkle (R)	Walter E. Pearson (D)	C. H. Gram (R)	Rex Putnam (D)	22R, 8D	46R, 13D, 1I	Charles L. McNary (R)	Rufus C. Holman (R)	2R, 1D	Roosevelt/ Garner (D) ✓
1940	Charles A. Sprague (R)	Earl Snell (R)	Isaac H. Van Winkle (R)	Walter E. Pearson (D)	C. H. Gram (R)	Rex Putnam (D)	22R, 8D	46R, 13D, 1I	Charles L. McNary (R)	Rufus C. Holman (R)	2R, 1D	Roosevelt/ Wallace (D) ✓
1941	Charles A. Sprague (R)	Earl Snell (R)	Isaac H. Van Winkle (R)	Leslie M. Scott (R)	C. H. Gram (R)	Rex Putnam (D)	25R, 5D	38R, 22D	Charles L. McNary (R)	Rufus C. Holman (R)	2R, 1D	Roosevelt/ Wallace (D) ✓
1942	Charles A. Sprague (R)	Earl Snell (R)	Isaac H. Van Winkle (R)	Leslie M. Scott (R)	C. H. Gram (R)	Rex Putnam (D)	25R, 5D	38R, 22D	Charles L. McNary (R)	Rufus C. Holman (R)	2R, 1D	Roosevelt/ Wallace (D) ✓
1943	Earl Snell (R) (Note: Killed in the 1947 Oregon Beechcraft Bonanza crash.)	Robert S. Farrell Jr. (R)	Isaac H. Van Winkle (R)	Leslie M. Scott (R)	W. E. Kimsey (R)	Rex Putnam (NP/D) (Note: Office converted from partisan to nonpartisan by the Legislative Assembly, effective with the 1942 election.)	27R, 3D	51R, 9D	Charles L. McNary (R)	Rufus C. Holman (R)	4R	Roosevelt/ Wallace (D) ✓
1944	Earl Snell (R)	Robert S. Farrell Jr. (R)	George Neuner (R)	Leslie M. Scott (R)	W. E. Kimsey (R)	Rex Putnam (NP/D)	27R, 3D	51R, 9D	Charles L. McNary (R)	Rufus C. Holman (R)	4R	Roosevelt/ Truman (D) ✓
1944	Earl Snell (R)	Robert S. Farrell Jr. (R)	George Neuner (R)	Leslie M. Scott (R)	W. E. Kimsey (R)	Rex Putnam (NP/D)	27R, 3D	51R, 9D	Guy Cordon (R)	Rufus C. Holman (R)	4R	Roosevelt/ Truman (D) ✓
1945	Earl Snell (R)	Robert S. Farrell Jr. (R)	George Neuner (R)	Leslie M. Scott (R)	W. E. Kimsey (R)	Rex Putnam (NP/D)	25R, 5D	50R, 10D	Guy Cordon (R)	Wayne Morse (R)	4R	Roosevelt/ Truman (D) ✓
1946	Earl Snell (R)	Robert S. Farrell Jr. (R)	George Neuner (R)	Leslie M. Scott (R)	W. E. Kimsey (R)	Rex Putnam (NP/D)	25R, 5D	50R, 10D	Guy Cordon (R)	Wayne Morse (R)	4R	Roosevelt/ Truman (D) ✓
1947	Earl Snell (R)	Robert S. Farrell Jr. (R)	George Neuner (R)	Leslie M. Scott (R)	W. E. Kimsey (R)	Rex Putnam (NP/D)	25R, 5D	58R, 2D	Guy Cordon (R)	Wayne Morse (R)	4R	Roosevelt/ Truman (D) ✓
1947	John Hubert Hall (R)	Earl T. Newbry (R)	George Neuner (R)	Leslie M. Scott (R)	W. E. Kimsey (R)	Rex Putnam (NP/D)	25R, 5D	58R, 2D	Guy Cordon (R)	Wayne Morse (R)	4R	Roosevelt/ Truman (D) ✓
1948	John Hubert Hall (R)	Earl T. Newbry (R)	George Neuner (R)	Leslie M. Scott (R)	W. E. Kimsey (R)	Rex Putnam (NP/D)	25R, 5D	58R, 2D	Guy Cordon (R)	Wayne Morse (R)	4R	Dewey/ Warren (R) ✗
1949	Douglas McKay (R)	Earl T. Newbry (R)	George Neuner (R)	Walter J. Pearson (D)	W. E. Kimsey (R)	Rex Putnam (NP/D)	20R, 10D	51R, 9D	Guy Cordon (R)	Wayne Morse (R)	4R	Dewey/ Warren (R) ✗
1950	Douglas McKay (R)	Earl T. Newbry (R)	George Neuner (R)	Walter J. Pearson (D)	W. E. Kimsey (R)	Rex Putnam (NP/D)	20R, 10D	51R, 9D	Guy Cordon (R)	Wayne Morse (R)	4R	Dewey/ Warren (R) ✗
1951	Douglas McKay (R)	Earl T. Newbry (R)	George Neuner (R)	Walter J. Pearson (D)	W. E. Kimsey (R)	Rex Putnam (NP/D)	21R, 9D	51R, 9D	Guy Cordon (R)	Wayne Morse (R)	4R	Dewey/ Warren (R) ✗
1952	Douglas McKay (R)	Earl T. Newbry (R)	George Neuner (R)	Walter J. Pearson (D)	W. E. Kimsey (R)	Rex Putnam (NP/D)	21R, 9D	51R, 9D	Guy Cordon (R)	Wayne Morse (R)	4R	Eisenhower/ Nixon (R) ✓
1953	Paul L. Patterson (R) (Note: Assumed office following the death or resignation of predecessor, and subsequently elected in his or her own right.)	Earl T. Newbry (R)	Robert Y. Thornton (D)	Sig Unander (R)	W. E. Kimsey (R)	Rex Putnam (NP/D)	26R, 4D	49R, 11D	Guy Cordon (R)	Wayne Morse (I) (Note: Changed party affiliation from Republican to Independent in 1952.)	4R	Eisenhower/ Nixon (R) ✓
1954	Paul L. Patterson (R)	Earl T. Newbry (R)	Robert Y. Thornton (D)	Sig Unander (R)	W. E. Kimsey (R)	Rex Putnam (NP/D)	26R, 4D	49R, 11D	Guy Cordon (R)	Wayne Morse (I)	4R	Eisenhower/ Nixon (R) ✓
1955	Paul L. Patterson (R)	Earl T. Newbry (R)	Robert Y. Thornton (D)	Sig Unander (R)	Norman O. Nilsen (D)	Rex Putnam (NP/D)	24R, 6D	35R, 25D	Richard L. Neuberger (D)	Wayne Morse (D) (Note: Changed party affiliation from Independent to Democratic in 1955.)	3R, 1D	Eisenhower/ Nixon (R) ✓
1956	Elmo Smith (R)	Earl T. Newbry (R)	Robert Y. Thornton (D)	Sig Unander (R)	Norman O. Nilsen (D)	Rex Putnam (NP/D)	24R, 6D	35R, 25D	Richard L. Neuberger (D)	Wayne Morse (D)	3R, 1D	Eisenhower/ Nixon (R) ✓
1957	Robert D. Holmes (D)	Mark Hatfield (R) (Note: Resigned after election as governor.)	Robert Y. Thornton (D)	Sig Unander (R)	Norman O. Nilsen (D)	Rex Putnam (NP/D)	15D, 15R (Note: After 11 days of tied votes over organization of the chamber, one the twelfth day the two parties elected Democrat Boyd Overhulse as President, and organized the chamber on a bipartisan basis.)	37D, 23R	Richard L. Neuberger (D)	Wayne Morse (D)	3D, 1R	Eisenhower/ Nixon (R) ✓
1958	Robert D. Holmes (D)	Mark Hatfield (R)	Robert Y. Thornton (D)	Sig Unander (R)	Norman O. Nilsen (D)	Rex Putnam (NP/D)	15D, 15R	37D, 23R	Richard L. Neuberger (D)	Wayne Morse (D)	3D, 1R	Eisenhower/ Nixon (R) ✓
1959	Mark Hatfield (R)	Howell Appling Jr. (R)	Robert Y. Thornton (D)	Sig Unander (R)	Norman O. Nilsen (D)	Rex Putnam (NP/D)	19D, 11R	33D, 27R	Richard L. Neuberger (D)	Wayne Morse (D)	3D, 1R	Eisenhower/ Nixon (R) ✓
1960	Mark Hatfield (R)	Howell Appling Jr. (R)	Robert Y. Thornton (D)	Howard Belton (R)	Norman O. Nilsen (D)	Rex Putnam (NP/D)	19D, 11R	33D, 27R	Richard L. Neuberger (D)	Wayne Morse (D)	3D, 1R	Nixon/ Lodge (R) ✗
1960	Mark Hatfield (R)	Howell Appling Jr. (R)	Robert Y. Thornton (D)	Howard Belton (R)	Norman O. Nilsen (D)	Rex Putnam (NP/D)	19D, 11R	33D, 27R	Hall S. Lusk (D)	Wayne Morse (D)	3D, 1R	Nixon/ Lodge (R) ✗
1961	Mark Hatfield (R)	Howell Appling Jr. (R)	Robert Y. Thornton (D)	Howard Belton (R)	Norman O. Nilsen (D)	Leon P. Minear (NP) (Note: No election for Superintendent of Public Instruction held in 1962, due to legislative statute making the office appointive. Elections resumed in 1966 after the Oregon Supreme Court overturned the statute in 1965.)	20D, 10R	31D, 29R	Maurine Neuberger (D)	Wayne Morse (D)	2D, 2R	Nixon/ Lodge (R) ✗
1962	Mark Hatfield (R)	Howell Appling Jr. (R)	Robert Y. Thornton (D)	Howard Belton (R)	Norman O. Nilsen (D)	Leon P. Minear (NP)	20D, 10R	31D, 29R	Maurine Neuberger (D)	Wayne Morse (D)	2D, 2R	Nixon/ Lodge (R) ✗
1963	Mark Hatfield (R)	Howell Appling Jr. (R)	Robert Y. Thornton (D)	Howard Belton (R)	Norman O. Nilsen (D)	Leon P. Minear (NP)	21D, 9R	31D, 29R	Maurine Neuberger (D)	Wayne Morse (D)	3D, 1R	Nixon/ Lodge (R) ✗
1964	Mark Hatfield (R)	Howell Appling Jr. (R)	Robert Y. Thornton (D)	Howard Belton (R)	Norman O. Nilsen (D)	Leon P. Minear (NP)	21D, 9R	31D, 29R	Maurine Neuberger (D)	Wayne Morse (D)	3D, 1R	Johnson/ Humphrey (D) ✓
1965	Mark Hatfield (R)	Tom McCall (R)	Robert Y. Thornton (D)	Robert W. Straub (D)	Norman O. Nilsen (D)	Leon P. Minear (NP)	19D, 11R	33R, 27D	Maurine Neuberger (D)	Wayne Morse (D)	3D, 1R	Johnson/ Humphrey (D) ✓
1966	Mark Hatfield (R)	Tom McCall (R)	Robert Y. Thornton (D)	Robert W. Straub (D)	Norman O. Nilsen (D)	Leon P. Minear (NP)	19D, 11R	33R, 27D	Maurine Neuberger (D)	Wayne Morse (D)	3D, 1R	Johnson/ Humphrey (D) ✓
1967	Tom McCall (R)	H. Clay Myers Jr. (R)	Robert Y. Thornton (D)	Robert W. Straub (D)	Norman O. Nilsen (D)	Leon P. Minear (NP)	19D, 11R	38R, 22D	Mark Hatfield (R)	Wayne Morse (D)	2D, 2R	Johnson/ Humphrey (D) ✓
1968	Tom McCall (R)	H. Clay Myers Jr. (R)	Robert Y. Thornton (D)	Robert W. Straub (D)	Norman O. Nilsen (D)	Leon P. Minear (NP)	19D, 11R	38R, 22D	Mark Hatfield (R)	Wayne Morse (D)	2D, 2R	Nixon/ Agnew (R) ✓
1968	Tom McCall (R)	H. Clay Myers Jr. (R)	Robert Y. Thornton (D)	Robert W. Straub (D)	Norman O. Nilsen (D)	Jesse V. Fasold (NP)	19D, 11R	38R, 22D	Mark Hatfield (R)	Wayne Morse (D)	2D, 2R	Nixon/ Agnew (R) ✓
1968	Tom McCall (R)	H. Clay Myers Jr. (R)	Robert Y. Thornton (D)	Robert W. Straub (D)	Norman O. Nilsen (D)	Dale Parnell (NP)	19D, 11R	38R, 22D	Mark Hatfield (R)	Wayne Morse (D)	2D, 2R	Nixon/ Agnew (R) ✓
1969	Tom McCall (R)	H. Clay Myers Jr. (R)	Robert Y. Thornton (D)	Robert W. Straub (D)	Norman O. Nilsen (D)	Dale Parnell (NP)	16D, 14R	38R, 22D	Mark Hatfield (R)	Wayne Morse (D)	2D, 2R	Nixon/ Agnew (R) ✓
1969	Tom McCall (R)	H. Clay Myers Jr. (R)	Lee Johnson (R)	Robert W. Straub (D)	Norman O. Nilsen (D)	Dale Parnell (NP)	16D, 14R	38R, 22D	Mark Hatfield (R)	Bob Packwood (R)	2D, 2R	Nixon/ Agnew (R) ✓
1970	Tom McCall (R)	H. Clay Myers Jr. (R)	Lee Johnson (R)	Robert W. Straub (D)	Norman O. Nilsen (D)	Dale Parnell (NP)	16D, 14R	38R, 22D	Mark Hatfield (R)	Bob Packwood (R)	2D, 2R	Nixon/ Agnew (R) ✓
1971	Tom McCall (R)	H. Clay Myers Jr. (R)	Lee Johnson (R)	Robert W. Straub (D)	Norman O. Nilsen (D)	Dale Parnell (NP)	16D, 14R	34R, 26D	Mark Hatfield (R)	Bob Packwood (R)	2D, 2R	Nixon/ Agnew (R) ✓
1972	Tom McCall (R)	H. Clay Myers Jr. (R)	Lee Johnson (R)	Robert W. Straub (D)	Norman O. Nilsen (D)	Dale Parnell (NP)	16D, 14R	34R, 26D	Mark Hatfield (R)	Bob Packwood (R)	2D, 2R	Nixon/ Agnew (R) ✓
1973	Tom McCall (R)	H. Clay Myers Jr. (R)	Lee Johnson (R)	James A. Redden (D)	Norman O. Nilsen (D)	Dale Parnell (NP)	18D, 12R	33D, 27R	Mark Hatfield (R)	Bob Packwood (R)	2D, 2R	Nixon/ Agnew (R) ✓
1974	Tom McCall (R)	H. Clay Myers Jr. (R)	Lee Johnson (R)	James A. Redden (D)	Norman O. Nilsen (D)	Dale Parnell (NP)	18D, 12R	33D, 27R	Mark Hatfield (R)	Bob Packwood (R)	2D, 2R	Nixon/ Agnew (R) ✓
1974	Tom McCall (R)	H. Clay Myers Jr. (R)	Lee Johnson (R)	James A. Redden (D)	Norman O. Nilsen (D)	Jesse V. Fasold (NP)	18D, 12R	33D, 27R	Mark Hatfield (R)	Bob Packwood (R)	2D, 2R	Nixon/ Agnew (R) ✓
1975	Robert W. Straub (D)	H. Clay Myers Jr. (R)	Lee Johnson (R)	James A. Redden (D)	Bill Stevenson (D)	Verne Duncan (NP)	22D, 7R, 1I	38D, 22R	Mark Hatfield (R)	Bob Packwood (R)	4D	Nixon/ Agnew (R) ✓
1976	Robert W. Straub (D)	H. Clay Myers Jr. (R)	Lee Johnson (R)	James A. Redden (D)	Bill Stevenson (D)	Verne Duncan (NP)	22D, 7R, 1I	38D, 22R	Mark Hatfield (R)	Bob Packwood (R)	4D	Ford/ Dole (R) ✗
1977	Robert W. Straub (D)	Norma Paulus (R)	James Redden (D)	H. Clay Myers Jr. (R)	Bill Stevenson (D)	Verne Duncan (NP)	24D, 6R (Note: The Independent from the 1975 session switched their party affiliation to Democratic.)	37D, 23R	Mark Hatfield (R)	Bob Packwood (R)	4D	Ford/ Dole (R) ✗
1978	Robert W. Straub (D)	Norma Paulus (R)	James Redden (D)	H. Clay Myers Jr. (R)	Bill Stevenson (D)	Verne Duncan (NP)	24D, 6R	37D, 23R	Mark Hatfield (R)	Bob Packwood (R)	4D	Ford/ Dole (R) ✗
1979	Victor Atiyeh (R)	Norma Paulus (R)	James Redden (D)	H. Clay Myers Jr. (R)	Mary Wendy Roberts (D)	Verne Duncan (NP)	23D, 7R	34D, 26R	Mark Hatfield (R)	Bob Packwood (R)	4D	Ford/ Dole (R) ✗
1980	Victor Atiyeh (R)	Norma Paulus (R)	James Redden (D)	H. Clay Myers Jr. (R)	Mary Wendy Roberts (D)	Verne Duncan (NP)	23D, 7R	34D, 26R	Mark Hatfield (R)	Bob Packwood (R)	4D	Reagan/ Bush (R) ✓
1980	Victor Atiyeh (R)	Norma Paulus (R)	James M. Brown (D)	H. Clay Myers Jr. (R)	Mary Wendy Roberts (D)	Verne Duncan (NP)	23D, 7R	34D, 26R	Mark Hatfield (R)	Bob Packwood (R)	4D	Reagan/ Bush (R) ✓
1981	Victor Atiyeh (R)	Norma Paulus (R)	David B. Frohnmayer (R)	H. Clay Myers Jr. (R)	Mary Wendy Roberts (D)	Verne Duncan (NP)	22D, 8R	33D, 27R	Mark Hatfield (R)	Bob Packwood (R)	3D, 1R	Reagan/ Bush (R) ✓
1982	Victor Atiyeh (R)	Norma Paulus (R)	David B. Frohnmayer (R)	H. Clay Myers Jr. (R)	Mary Wendy Roberts (D)	Verne Duncan (NP)	22D, 8R	33D, 27R	Mark Hatfield (R)	Bob Packwood (R)	3D, 1R	Reagan/ Bush (R) ✓
1983	Victor Atiyeh (R)	Norma Paulus (R)	David B. Frohnmayer (R)	H. Clay Myers Jr. (R)	Mary Wendy Roberts (D)	Verne Duncan (NP)	21D, 9R	36D, 24R	Mark Hatfield (R)	Bob Packwood (R)	3D, 2R	Reagan/ Bush (R) ✓
1984	Victor Atiyeh (R)	Norma Paulus (R)	David B. Frohnmayer (R)	H. Clay Myers Jr. (R)	Mary Wendy Roberts (D)	Verne Duncan (NP)	21D, 9R	36D, 24R	Mark Hatfield (R)	Bob Packwood (R)	3D, 2R	Reagan/ Bush (R) ✓
1984	Victor Atiyeh (R)	Norma Paulus (R)	David B. Frohnmayer (R)	Bill Rutherford (R)	Mary Wendy Roberts (D)	Verne Duncan (NP)	21D, 9R	36D, 24R	Mark Hatfield (R)	Bob Packwood (R)	3D, 2R	Reagan/ Bush (R) ✓
1985	Victor Atiyeh (R)	Barbara Roberts (D)	David B. Frohnmayer (R)	Bill Rutherford (R)	Mary Wendy Roberts (D)	Verne Duncan (NP)	18D, 12R	34D, 26R	Mark Hatfield (R)	Bob Packwood (R)	3D, 2R	Reagan/ Bush (R) ✓
1986	Victor Atiyeh (R)	Barbara Roberts (D)	David B. Frohnmayer (R)	Bill Rutherford (R)	Mary Wendy Roberts (D)	Verne Duncan (NP)	18D, 12R	34D, 26R	Mark Hatfield (R)	Bob Packwood (R)	3D, 2R	Reagan/ Bush (R) ✓
1987	Neil Goldschmidt (D)	Barbara Roberts (D)	David B. Frohnmayer (R)	Bill Rutherford (R)	Mary Wendy Roberts (D)	Verne Duncan (NP)	18D, 12R	34D, 26R	Mark Hatfield (R)	Bob Packwood (R)	3D, 2R	Reagan/ Bush (R) ✓
1987	Neil Goldschmidt (D)	Barbara Roberts (D)	David B. Frohnmayer (R)	Tony Meeker (R)	Mary Wendy Roberts (D)	Verne Duncan (NP)	17D, 13R	31D, 29R	Mark Hatfield (R)	Bob Packwood (R)	3D, 2R	Reagan/ Bush (R) ✓
1988	Neil Goldschmidt (D)	Barbara Roberts (D)	David B. Frohnmayer (R)	Tony Meeker (R)	Mary Wendy Roberts (D)	Verne Duncan (NP)	17D, 13R	31D, 29R	Mark Hatfield (R)	Bob Packwood (R)	3D, 2R	Dukakis/ Bentsen (D) ✗
1989	Neil Goldschmidt (D)	Barbara Roberts (D)	David B. Frohnmayer (R)	Tony Meeker (R)	Mary Wendy Roberts (D)	Verne Duncan (NP)	19D, 11R	32D, 28R	Mark Hatfield (R)	Bob Packwood (R)	3D, 2R	Dukakis/ Bentsen (D) ✗
1990	Neil Goldschmidt (D)	Barbara Roberts (D)	David B. Frohnmayer (R)	Tony Meeker (R)	Mary Wendy Roberts (D)	John Erickson (NP)	19D, 11R	32D, 28R	Mark Hatfield (R)	Bob Packwood (R)	3D, 2R	Dukakis/ Bentsen (D) ✗
1990	Neil Goldschmidt (D)	Barbara Roberts (D)	David B. Frohnmayer (R)	Tony Meeker (R)	Mary Wendy Roberts (D)	Norma Paulus (NP/R)	19D, 11R	32D, 28R	Mark Hatfield (R)	Bob Packwood (R)	3D, 2R	Dukakis/ Bentsen (D) ✗
1991	Barbara Roberts (D)	Phil Keisling (D)	David B. Frohnmayer (R)	Tony Meeker (R)	Mary Wendy Roberts (D)	Norma Paulus (NP/R)	20D, 10R	31R, 29D	Mark Hatfield (R)	Bob Packwood (R)	4D, 1R	Dukakis/ Bentsen (D) ✗
1992	Barbara Roberts (D)	Phil Keisling (D)	Charles Crookham (R)	Tony Meeker (R)	Mary Wendy Roberts (D)	Norma Paulus (NP/R)	20D, 10R	31R, 29D	Mark Hatfield (R)	Bob Packwood (R)	4D, 1R	Clinton/ Gore (D) ✓
1993	Barbara Roberts (D)	Phil Keisling (D)	Ted Kulongoski (D)	Jim Hill (D)	Mary Wendy Roberts (D)	Norma Paulus (NP/R)	16D, 14R	32R, 28D	Mark Hatfield (R)	Bob Packwood (R)	4D, 1R	Clinton/ Gore (D) ✓
1994	Barbara Roberts (D)	Phil Keisling (D)	Ted Kulongoski (D)	Jim Hill (D)	Mary Wendy Roberts (D)	Norma Paulus (NP/R)	16D, 14R	32R, 28D	Mark Hatfield (R)	Bob Packwood (R)	4D, 1R	Clinton/ Gore (D) ✓
1995	John Kitzhaber (D)	Phil Keisling (D)	Ted Kulongoski (D)	Jim Hill (D)	Jack Roberts (R)	Norma Paulus (NP/R)	19R, 11D	33R, 27D	Mark Hatfield (R)	Bob Packwood (R)	3D, 2R	Clinton/ Gore (D) ✓
1996	John Kitzhaber (D)	Phil Keisling (D)	Ted Kulongoski (D)	Jim Hill (D)	Jack Roberts (R)	Norma Paulus (NP/R)	19R, 11D	33R, 27D	Mark Hatfield (R)	Bob Packwood (R)	3D, 2R	Clinton/ Gore (D) ✓
1996	John Kitzhaber (D)	Phil Keisling (D)	Ted Kulongoski (D)	Jim Hill (D)	Jack Roberts (R)	Norma Paulus (NP/R)	19R, 11D	33R, 27D	Mark Hatfield (R)	Ron Wyden (D) (Note: Initially elected in special election.)	3D, 2R	Clinton/ Gore (D) ✓
1997	John Kitzhaber (D)	Phil Keisling (D)	Hardy Myers (D)	Jim Hill (D)	Jack Roberts (R)	Norma Paulus (NP/R)	20R, 10D	31R, 29D	Gordon Smith (R)	Ron Wyden (D)	4D, 1R	Clinton/ Gore (D) ✓
1998	John Kitzhaber (D)	Phil Keisling (D)	Hardy Myers (D)	Jim Hill (D)	Jack Roberts (R)	Norma Paulus (NP/R)	20R, 10D	31R, 29D	Gordon Smith (R)	Ron Wyden (D)	4D, 1R	Clinton/ Gore (D) ✓
1999	John Kitzhaber (D)	Phil Keisling (D)	Hardy Myers (D)	Jim Hill (D)	Jack Roberts (NP/R) (Note: Office converted from partisan to nonpartisan by the 1995 Legislative Assembly.)	Stan Bunn (NP/R)	17R, 13D	34R, 25D, 1I	Gordon Smith (R)	Ron Wyden (D)	4D, 1R	Clinton/ Gore (D) ✓
2000	John Kitzhaber (D)	Bill Bradbury (D)	Hardy Myers (D)	Jim Hill (D)	Jack Roberts (NP/R)	Stan Bunn (NP/R)	17R, 13D	34R, 25D, 1I	Gordon Smith (R)	Ron Wyden (D)	4D, 1R	Gore/ Lieberman (D) ✗
2001	John Kitzhaber (D)	Bill Bradbury (D)	Hardy Myers (D)	Randall Edwards (D)	Jack Roberts (NP/R)	Stan Bunn (NP/R)	16R, 14D	32R, 27D, 1I	Gordon Smith (R)	Ron Wyden (D)	4D, 1R	Gore/ Lieberman (D) ✗
2002	John Kitzhaber (D)	Bill Bradbury (D)	Hardy Myers (D)	Randall Edwards (D)	Jack Roberts (NP/R)	Stan Bunn (NP/R)	16R, 14D	32R, 27D, 1I	Gordon Smith (R)	Ron Wyden (D)	4D, 1R	Gore/ Lieberman (D) ✗
2003	Ted Kulongoski (D)	Bill Bradbury (D)	Hardy Myers (D)	Randall Edwards (D)	Dan Gardner (NP/D)	Susan Castillo (NP/D)	15D, 15R (Note: A power-sharing agreement was negotiated, with Democrats choosing Peter Courtney to be the president, Republicans choosing Lenn Hannon as president pro tempore, and all committees and chairmanships split evenly between the parties.)	35R, 25D	Gordon Smith (R)	Ron Wyden (D)	4D, 1R	Gore/ Lieberman (D) ✗
2004	Ted Kulongoski (D)	Bill Bradbury (D)	Hardy Myers (D)	Randall Edwards (D)	Dan Gardner (NP/D)	Susan Castillo (NP/D)	15D, 15R	35R, 25D	Gordon Smith (R)	Ron Wyden (D)	4D, 1R	Kerry/ Edwards (D) ✗
2005	Ted Kulongoski (D)	Bill Bradbury (D)	Hardy Myers (D)	Randall Edwards (D)	Dan Gardner (NP/D)	Susan Castillo (NP/D)	17D, 11R	33R, 27D	Gordon Smith (R)	Ron Wyden (D)	4D, 1R	Kerry/ Edwards (D) ✗
2006	Ted Kulongoski (D)	Bill Bradbury (D)	Hardy Myers (D)	Randall Edwards (D)	Dan Gardner (NP/D)	Susan Castillo (NP/D)	17D, 11R	33R, 27D	Gordon Smith (R)	Ron Wyden (D)	4D, 1R	Kerry/ Edwards (D) ✗
2007	Ted Kulongoski (D)	Bill Bradbury (D)	Hardy Myers (D)	Randall Edwards (D)	Dan Gardner (NP/D)	Susan Castillo (NP/D)	19D, 11R	31D, 29R	Gordon Smith (R)	Ron Wyden (D)	4D, 1R	Kerry/ Edwards (D) ✗
2008	Ted Kulongoski (D)	Bill Bradbury (D)	Hardy Myers (D)	Randall Edwards (D)	Dan Gardner (NP/D)	Susan Castillo (NP/D)	19D, 11R	31D, 29R	Gordon Smith (R)	Ron Wyden (D)	4D, 1R	Obama/ Biden (D) ✓
2008	Ted Kulongoski (D)	Bill Bradbury (D)	Hardy Myers (D)	Randall Edwards (D)	Brad Avakian (NP/D)	Susan Castillo (NP/D)	19D, 11R	31D, 29R	Gordon Smith (R)	Ron Wyden (D)	4D, 1R	Obama/ Biden (D) ✓
2009	Ted Kulongoski (D)	Kate Brown (D)	John Kroger (D)	Ben Westlund (D)	Brad Avakian (NP/D)	Susan Castillo (NP/D)	18D, 12R	36D, 24R	Jeff Merkley (D)	Ron Wyden (D)	4D, 1R	Obama/ Biden (D) ✓
2010	Ted Kulongoski (D)	Kate Brown (D)	John Kroger (D)	Ted Wheeler (D)	Brad Avakian (NP/D)	Susan Castillo (NP/D)	18D, 12R	36D, 24R	Jeff Merkley (D)	Ron Wyden (D)	4D, 1R	Obama/ Biden (D) ✓
2011	John Kitzhaber (D) (Note: Won re-election to fourth term in 2014 but resigned on February 13, 2015 effective February 18, 2015.)	Kate Brown (D)	John Kroger (D)	Ted Wheeler (D)	Brad Avakian (NP/D)	Susan Castillo (NP/D)	16D, 14R	30D, 30R (Note: A power-sharing agreement was negotiated, with Democrats choosing Arnie Roblan to be their Co-Speaker, Republicans choosing Bruce Hanna as their Co-Speaker, and all committees and chairmanships split evenly between the parties.)	Jeff Merkley (D)	Ron Wyden (D)	4D, 1R	Obama/ Biden (D) ✓
2012	John Kitzhaber (D)	Kate Brown (D)	Ellen Rosenblum (D)	Ted Wheeler (D)	Brad Avakian (NP/D)	(Note: Elected position eliminated by state law. Governor serves as Superintendent and appoints a deputy to oversee the duties of the office.)	16D, 14R	30D, 30R	Jeff Merkley (D)	Ron Wyden (D)	4D, 1R	Obama/ Biden (D) ✓
2013	John Kitzhaber (D)	Kate Brown (D)	Ellen Rosenblum (D)	Ted Wheeler (D)	Brad Avakian (NP/D)	(Note: Elected position eliminated by state law. Governor serves as Superintendent and appoints a deputy to oversee the duties of the office.)	16D, 14R	34D, 26R	Jeff Merkley (D)	Ron Wyden (D)	4D, 1R	Obama/ Biden (D) ✓
2014	John Kitzhaber (D)	Kate Brown (D)	Ellen Rosenblum (D)	Ted Wheeler (D)	Brad Avakian (NP/D)	(Note: Elected position eliminated by state law. Governor serves as Superintendent and appoints a deputy to oversee the duties of the office.)	16D, 14R	34D, 26R	Jeff Merkley (D)	Ron Wyden (D)	4D, 1R	Obama/ Biden (D) ✓
2015	John Kitzhaber (D)	Kate Brown (D)	Ellen Rosenblum (D)	Ted Wheeler (D)	Brad Avakian (NP/D)	(Note: Elected position eliminated by state law. Governor serves as Superintendent and appoints a deputy to oversee the duties of the office.)	18D, 12R	35D, 25R	Jeff Merkley (D)	Ron Wyden (D)	4D, 1R	Obama/ Biden (D) ✓
2015	Kate Brown (D)	Jeanne Atkins (D)	Ellen Rosenblum (D)	Ted Wheeler (D)	Brad Avakian (NP/D)	(Note: Elected position eliminated by state law. Governor serves as Superintendent and appoints a deputy to oversee the duties of the office.)	18D, 12R	35D, 25R	Jeff Merkley (D)	Ron Wyden (D)	4D, 1R	Obama/ Biden (D) ✓
2016	Kate Brown (D)	Jeanne Atkins (D)	Ellen Rosenblum (D)	Ted Wheeler (D)	Brad Avakian (NP/D)	(Note: Elected position eliminated by state law. Governor serves as Superintendent and appoints a deputy to oversee the duties of the office.)	18D, 12R	35D, 25R	Jeff Merkley (D)	Ron Wyden (D)	4D, 1R	Clinton/ Kaine (D) ✗
2017	Kate Brown (D)	Dennis Richardson (R)	Ellen Rosenblum (D)	Tobias Read (D)	Brad Avakian (NP/D)	(Note: Elected position eliminated by state law. Governor serves as Superintendent and appoints a deputy to oversee the duties of the office.)	17D, 13R	35D, 25R	Jeff Merkley (D)	Ron Wyden (D)	4D, 1R	Clinton/ Kaine (D) ✗
2018	Kate Brown (D)	Dennis Richardson (R)	Ellen Rosenblum (D)	Tobias Read (D)	Brad Avakian (NP/D)	(Note: Elected position eliminated by state law. Governor serves as Superintendent and appoints a deputy to oversee the duties of the office.)	17D, 13R	35D, 25R	Jeff Merkley (D)	Ron Wyden (D)	4D, 1R	Clinton/ Kaine (D) ✗
2019	Kate Brown (D)	Dennis Richardson (R)	Ellen Rosenblum (D)	Tobias Read (D)	Val Hoyle (NP/D)	(Note: Elected position eliminated by state law. Governor serves as Superintendent and appoints a deputy to oversee the duties of the office.)	18D, 12R	38D, 22R	Jeff Merkley (D)	Ron Wyden (D)	4D, 1R	Clinton/ Kaine (D) ✗
2019	Kate Brown (D)	Bev Clarno (R)	Ellen Rosenblum (D)	Tobias Read (D)	Val Hoyle (NP/D)	(Note: Elected position eliminated by state law. Governor serves as Superintendent and appoints a deputy to oversee the duties of the office.)	18D, 12R	38D, 22R	Jeff Merkley (D)	Ron Wyden (D)	4D, 1R	Clinton/ Kaine (D) ✗
2020	Kate Brown (D)	Bev Clarno (R)	Ellen Rosenblum (D)	Tobias Read (D)	Val Hoyle (NP/D)	(Note: Elected position eliminated by state law. Governor serves as Superintendent and appoints a deputy to oversee the duties of the office.)	18D, 12R	38D, 22R	Jeff Merkley (D)	Ron Wyden (D)	4D, 1R	Biden/ Harris (D) ✓
2021	Kate Brown (D)	Shemia Fagan (D)	Ellen Rosenblum (D)	Tobias Read (D)	Val Hoyle (NP/D)	(Note: Elected position eliminated by state law. Governor serves as Superintendent and appoints a deputy to oversee the duties of the office.)	18D, 11R, 1I (Note: Sen. Brian Boquist left the Republican Party on registered as a member of the Independent Party of Oregon.)	37D, 23R	Jeff Merkley (D)	Ron Wyden (D)	4D, 1R	Biden/ Harris (D) ✓
2022	Kate Brown (D)	Shemia Fagan (D)	Ellen Rosenblum (D)	Tobias Read (D)	Val Hoyle (NP/D)	(Note: Elected position eliminated by state law. Governor serves as Superintendent and appoints a deputy to oversee the duties of the office.)	18D, 11R, 1I	37D, 23R	Jeff Merkley (D)	Ron Wyden (D)	4D, 1R	Biden/ Harris (D) ✓
2023	Tina Kotek (D)	LaVonne Griffin-Valade (D)	Ellen Rosenblum (D)	Tobias Read (D)	Christina Stephenson (NP/D)	(Note: Elected position eliminated by state law. Governor serves as Superintendent and appoints a deputy to oversee the duties of the office.)	17D, 12R, 1I	35D, 25R	Jeff Merkley (D)	Ron Wyden (D)	4D, 2R	Biden/ Harris (D) ✓
2024	Tina Kotek (D)	LaVonne Griffin-Valade (D)	Ellen Rosenblum (D)	Tobias Read (D)	Christina Stephenson (NP/D)	(Note: Elected position eliminated by state law. Governor serves as Superintendent and appoints a deputy to oversee the duties of the office.)	17D, 13R (Note: Senator Brian Boquist left the Independent Party of Oregon, re-registering as a Republican and re-joining the Republican caucus.)	35D, 24R, 1I (Note: Representative Charlie Conrad left the Republican Party on June 20, 2024 and registered as a member of the Independent Party of Oregon.)	Jeff Merkley (D)	Ron Wyden (D)	4D, 2R	Harris/ Walz (D) ✗
2025	Tina Kotek (D)	Tobias Read (D)	Dan Rayfield (D)	Elizabeth Steiner (D)	Christina Stephenson (NP/D)	(Note: Elected position eliminated by state law. Governor serves as Superintendent and appoints a deputy to oversee the duties of the office.)	18D, 12R	36D, 24R	Jeff Merkley (D)	Ron Wyden (D)	5D, 1R	Harris/ Walz (D) ✗
2025	Tina Kotek (D)	Tobias Read (D)	Dan Rayfield (D)	Elizabeth Steiner (D)	Christina Stephenson (NP/D)	(Note: Elected position eliminated by state law. Governor serves as Superintendent and appoints a deputy to oversee the duties of the office.)	18D, 12R	37D, 23R (Note: Representative Cyrus Javadi left the Republican Party on September 5, 2025 and registered as a member of the Democratic Party of Oregon.)	Jeff Merkley (D)	Ron Wyden (D)	5D, 1R	Harris/ Walz (D) ✗
2026	Tina Kotek (D)	Tobias Read (D)	Dan Rayfield (D)	Elizabeth Steiner (D)	Christina Stephenson (NP/D)	(Note: Elected position eliminated by state law. Governor serves as Superintendent and appoints a deputy to oversee the duties of the office.)	18D, 12R	37D, 23R	Jeff Merkley (D)	Ron Wyden (D)	5D, 1R	Harris/ Walz (D) ✗
2027	Tina Kotek (D)	Tobias Read (D)	Dan Rayfield (D)	Elizabeth Steiner (D)	Christina Stephenson (NP/D)	(Note: Elected position eliminated by state law. Governor serves as Superintendent and appoints a deputy to oversee the duties of the office.)	19D, 11R	39D, 21R	Jeff Merkley (D)	Ron Wyden (D)	5D, 1R	Harris/ Walz (D) ✗

Key to party colors and abbreviations for members of the U.S. Congress and other politicians or officials
Alaskan Independence (AKIP) Know Nothing (KN) American Labor (AL) Anti-Jacksonian (Anti-J); National Republican (NR) Anti-Administration (AA) Anti-Masonic (Anti-M) Conservative (Con) Covenant (Cov)	Democratic (D) Democratic–Farmer–Labor (DFL) Democratic–NPL (D-NPL) Dixiecrat (Dix), States' Rights (SR) Democratic-Republican (DR) Farmer–Labor (FL) Federalist (F); Pro-Administration (PA)	Free Soil (FS) Fusion (Fus) Greenback (GB) Independence (IPM) Jacksonian (J) Liberal (Lib) Libertarian (L) National Union (NU)	Nonpartisan League (NPL) Nullifier (N) Opposition Northern (O); Opposition Southern (O) Populist (Pop) Progressive (Prog) Prohibition (Proh) Readjuster (Rea)	Republican (R) Silver (Sv) Silver Republican (SvR) Socialist (Soc) Union (U) Unconditional Union (UU) Vermont Progressive (VP) Whig (W)	Independent (I) Nonpartisan (NP)

== See also ==
- Politics in Oregon
- Politics of Oregon
- Elections in Oregon
