= Sam Simpson =

Samuel or Sam Simpson may refer to:

- Sam Simpson (footballer) (born 1998), Australian rules footballer for Geelong
- Sam Simpson (gymnast) (born 1984), Australian gymnast
- Samuel L. Simpson (1845–1899), American poet
