= Oregon Diploma =

The Oregon Diploma is part of the public high school graduation requirements in the U.S. state of Oregon. It is the result of a redesign effort of Oregon's K-12 education system that focused on graduation requirements. The Oregon Diploma requirements were advocated for by Oregon Superintendent of Public Instruction Susan Castillo and adopted by the Oregon State Board of Education in 2007. They were fully implemented by 2014. Students are required to do a minimum of 24 credits for subjects such as English, Social science, mathematics, etc. Students also have to meet Personalized Learning Requirements and Essential skills in Reading, Writing, and Math. Individual districts might have slightly different requirements, such as Portland Public Schools requiring 2 years of world language as part of the elective section. Since the COVID-19 pandemic, the graduating classes of 2020 and 2021 were exempt from the Personalized Learning Requirements and Essential Skills to graduate. Individual School District's were not allowed in any circumstance to add or change requirements and were also not allowed to issue a District Diploma, they must issue an Oregon State Diploma. The class of 2022 are also exempt from Essential Skills requirement's, although they are still required to complete all the Personalized Learning Requirements.

In 2023, the state extended lowered requirements for graduation to 2024, prompting backlash from some commentators.

== See also ==
- Oregon modified high school diploma
