= Verne Duncan =

American politician (born 1934)

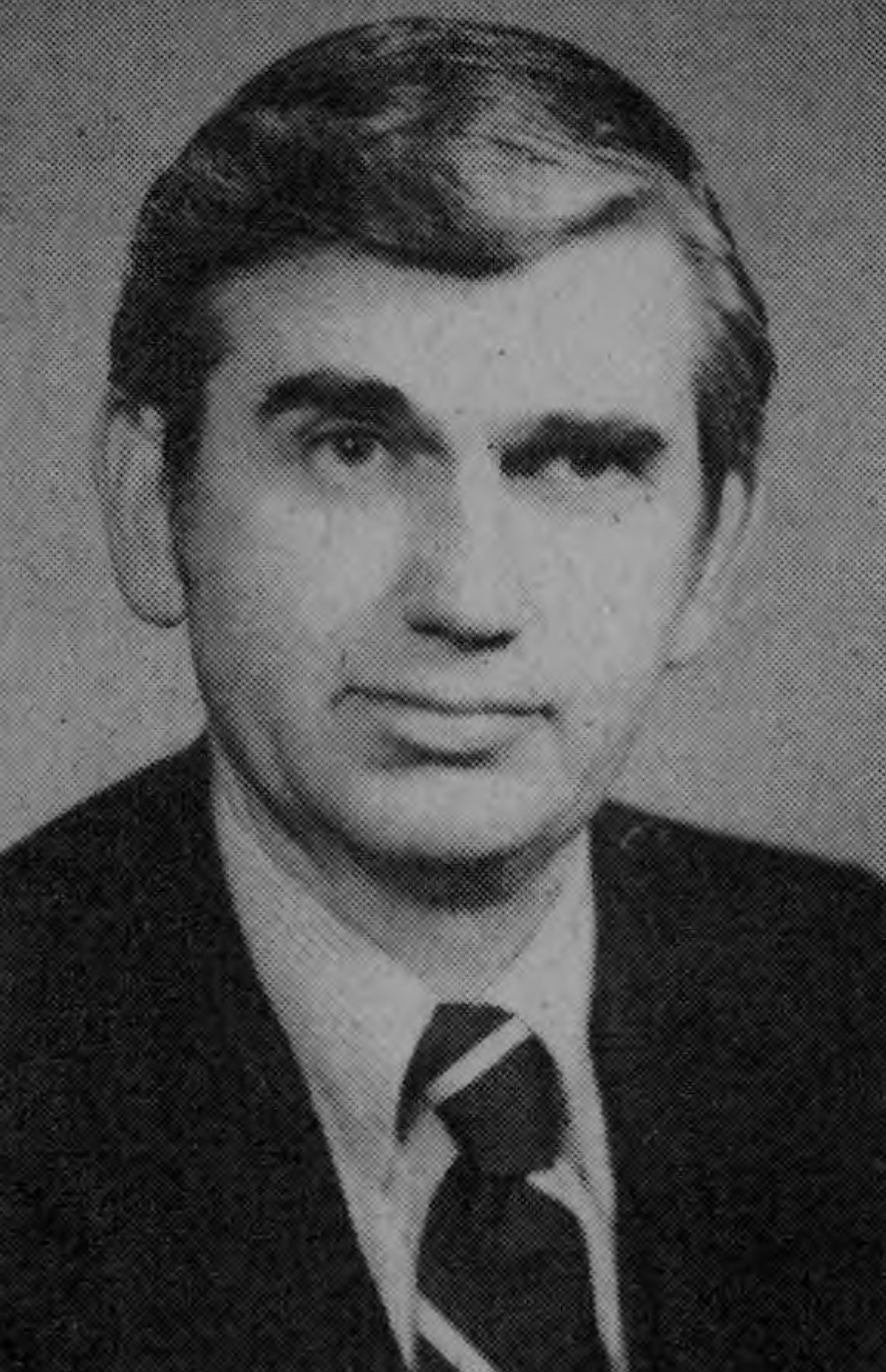

Member of the Oregon Senate from the 20th district
- In office 1997–2003
- Preceded by: Bill Kennemer
- Succeeded by: Kurt Schrader

Oregon Superintendent of Public Instruction
- In office 1975–1989
- Governor: Robert W. Straub; Victor Atiyeh; Neil Goldschmidt
- Preceded by: Jesse Fassold
- Succeeded by: John Erickson

Member of the Idaho House of Representatives from Butte County
- In office 1962–1965

Personal details
- Born: Verne Allen Duncan; April 6, 1934 (age 92) McMinnville, Oregon U.S.
- Party: Republican. Independent since 2022
- Spouse(s): Donna Nichols Duncan, (1937-2018)
- Children: Annette Kirk, Christine Didway
- Education: Idaho State university (BA); University of Idaho (MEd); University of Oregon (PhD); University of Portland (MBA)
- Occupation: Educator, Politician

Verne Allen Duncan (born April 6, 1934) is an American politician from the state of Oregon. As an educator and moderate Republican, he has become outspoken in protest of policies of his own party he views as extreme.

A former classroom teacher, principal, district superintendent and professor, Duncan has served in the legislatures of two states, Idaho and Oregon, held the office of Oregon Superintendent of Public Instruction, and served as a university dean.

== Early life ==
Born and raised in McMinnville, Duncan is a member of a pioneer Oregon family. His grandfather, S.S. Duncan, had been a teacher and for many years was superintendent of schools for Yamhill County. His uncle was Leland Duncan, long-time district attorney of Harney County, Oregon.

As a schoolboy, Duncan had occasion to visit the state Department of Education on a class trip. When he needed a workspace on which to take down some notes, then-superintendent Rex Putnam rose from his desk and offered it to the young Duncan. Neither knew the boy would grow up to occupy that desk for fifteen years as superintendent himself.

After completing a public school education, including graduation from McMinnville High School, he attended Linfield College in McMinnville, Oregon. Duncan served in the United States Army, remaining active in the reserves, ultimately attaining the rank of colonel. Duncan graduated from Idaho State College, earning a B.A. in 1960, and began a long career in education. He would ultimately earn several graduate degrees, including an M.Ed. in Education Administration from the University of Idaho, a PhD in Public School Administration from the University of Oregon and an M.B.A. in Labor Management from the University of Portland.

== Career in education and politics ==
Duncan began his teaching career in the Butte County Public Schools in Arco, Idaho, in 1954. He subsequently became a principal and later the superintendent of schools. Before serving as superintendent, he was elected to the state legislature, serving from 1962 to 1965. He then completed his Ph.D. at the University of Oregon and after a short interim on the faculty at the University became the Superintendent of Schools of the Clackamas County Intermediate Education District. In 1974, he was elected State Superintendent of Schools. After his four-term tenure as Oregon's Superintendent of Public Instruction, Duncan returned to teaching in 1990, serving as dean of the University of Portland’s School of Education until 1996, when he took emeritus professor status. He was appointed the following year by Governor Kitzhaber to fill a vacancy in the Oregon State Senate, and was elected to serve a full four-year term in 1998 after defeating Monroe Sweetland in the November election.

As a politician, Duncan took positions which placed him in the progressive or moderate wing of the Oregon Republican Party, as were many of his immediate predecessors and contemporaries, including the likes of Tom McCall, Clay Myers, Bob Packwood and Mark Hatfield. He supported the creation of Metro, voted for Governor Kitzhaber's transportation package, and was on record as pro-choice and in favor of nondiscrimination laws for gays, prompting Willamette Week to characterize him as "a moderate's moderate," in its 1998 editorial endorsement.

In a 2000 interview with The Oregonian, Duncan admitted to having voted personally for both Republican and Democratic presidential candidates, refusing to give particulars, but indicating that he was an enthusiastic supporter of George H. W. Bush but not his son. He also told the reporter that the Republicans must become more inclusive and less extreme. "Sometimes it doesn't hurt to lose," he said. "It keeps you humble."

== Legacy ==
In 2008, the North Clackamas School District named a new elementary school in Duncan's honor. Duncan lives in Oak Grove, within the District, and had served as district superintendent.
