= Oregon modified high school diploma =

Educational qualification in Oregon, United States

The Oregon modified high school diploma, also known as the OAR Modified Diploma, is a document that is given to students who have "a documented history of the inability to maintain grade level achievement due to significant learning and instructional barriers...or a documented history of a medical condition that creates a barrier to achievement." It was given following a 2007 Oregon law, and after some misuse was termed "diploma lite" by The Oregonian.

== Availability ==
Modified high school diplomas are awarded to students with disabilities who cannot pass regular academic classes even with special education accommodations and support. Even though students who earn modified high school diplomas take fewer academic classes in high school, they are eligible for federal financial aid in college but probably will not be accepted into the military.

Most special education students are helped through accommodations and support to earn standard (not modified) high school diplomas. The modified high school diplomas are awarded only to students with a documented history of not maintaining grade level achievement due to a learning, instructional, or medical barrier.

== Dropout loophole ==
In 2009, five Portland-area high schools, Marshall, Roosevelt, Madison, Jefferson, and Reynolds, were found to have used a loophole in the modified diploma program where the schools called non-disabled students disabled in order to award them a modified high school diploma, averaging one modified diploma per eight graduates. Schools awarded the modified diploma so they would not have to report a non-disabled student as having failed to graduate.

== Timeline ==
The parent of the disabled student will be notified if the student is eligible for a modified high school diploma when the student is in the sixth grade. Between the completion of 6th grade and two years before the student's anticipated completion of high school (age 21 for severely developmentally disabled people in Oregon), the parents must choose if they wish to pursue the diploma. After the 8th grade, the student's progress is reviewed annually by their parents and school team.

== See also ==
- Oregon Diploma
