= Sylvester C. Simpson =

American educator and lawyer

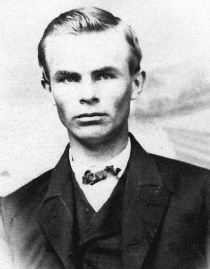
- Simpson as a young man

Oregon Superintendent of Public Instruction
- In office January 30, 1873 – September 14, 1874
- Governor: La Fayette Grover
- Preceded by: position created
- Succeeded by: Levi L. Rowland

Personal details
- Born: March 21, 1844 Elm Grove, Missouri
- Died: March 3, 1913 (aged 68) San Francisco, California
- Party: Democratic
- Spouse: Mary Francis McFarland

Sylvester Confucius Simpson (March 21, 1844 – May 3, 1913) was an American educator and attorney in the state of Oregon. A native of Missouri, he served as the first Oregon Superintendent of Public Instruction and was later the secretary to Oregon Governor Stephen F. Chadwick before moving to California. A Democrat, he also served as the chief clerk in the Oregon State Senate.

== Early years ==
Sylvester Simpson was born in Elm Grove, Missouri, on March 21, 1844, to Nancy (née Cooper) and Benjamin Simpson. In 1846, the family traveled the Oregon Trail to the Oregon Country and settled in the Willamette Valley. Sylvester received his early education in the schools of Marion and Polk counties, including attending the Dallas Academy in Dallas. He then enrolled at Willamette University in Salem where he studied law and graduated in 1864 with a masters of arts degree.

While still in college, he worked as a professor at Willamette, teaching ancient languages. Simpson also was a lecturer at the school on mythology. On October 11, 1866, he married Mary Francis McFarland in Salem. The couple would have nine children, five boys and four girls, with eight of the nine born in Salem. One of his brothers was poet Samuel L. Simpson.

== Political career ==
Simpson started working in government as the chief clerk of the Oregon Senate beginning with the 1868 legislative session. He maintained that position for the next five sessions, ending with the 1878 session. During this time, in May 1871, Governor La Fayette Grover appointed Simpson as the librarian for the state’s library. The next year during the 1872 legislature, Simpson’s father Benjamin was a member of the Oregon House, while his younger brother Samuel was a clerk for the Oregon House.

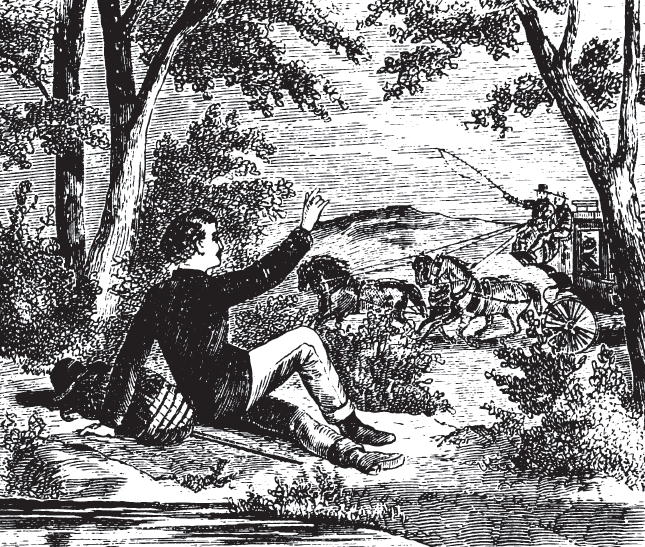
Illustration from the Fifth Reader published in 1875

A Democrat, Simpson was appointed by Grover to serve as the first Superintendent of Public Instruction for Oregon when the office was created in 1873. Simpson served in the position from January 30, 1873 until September 14, 1874. After appointment to the office, he helped select the school readers for the state, selecting the Pacific Coast Series in 1873. His brother Samuel was one of the writers for that series, with the books published by A.L. Bancroft & Co. in San Francisco. This led to assertions of favoritism, plus the content and quality of these books was questioned, which led to their removal from schools in 1879. By then Simpson had left office and had worked as the personal secretary for Governor Stephen F. Chadwick from 1877 until 1878. Simpson also ran to serve in the Oregon House in 1876, but lost the election.

== Later years ==
After leaving the superintendent’s office, Simpson also practiced law in Portland as well as Salem. He moved south to California in 1879; the family settled in San Francisco. Simpson continued his legal work, and was employed in part by Bancroft and Company, which had been at the center of the state reader controversy. On March 3, 1913, Sylvester Confucius Simpson died in San Francisco at the age of 68.
