= John W. Tibbatts =

American politician (1802–1852)

Member of the U.S. House of Representatives from Kentucky's 10th district
- In office March 4, 1843 – March 3, 1847
- Preceded by: Thomas F. Marshall
- Succeeded by: John P. Gaines

Personal details
- Born: John Wooleston Tibbatts; June 12, 1802 Lexington, Kentucky, U.S.
- Died: July 5, 1852 (aged 50) Newport, Kentucky, U.S.
- Resting place: Evergreen Cemetery
- Party: Democratic
- Spouse: Ann Wilkinson Taylor
- Occupation: Politician; lawyer

John Wooleston Tibbatts (June 12, 1802 – July 5, 1852) was an American politician and lawyer from Kentucky. He served in the Kentucky House of Representatives and representing the state in the United States House of Representatives. He was a colonel in the Mexican–American War and was civil military governor of Monterrey.

== Early life ==
John Wooleston Tibbatts was born on June 12, 1802, in Lexington, Kentucky. He was educated in the classics and read law under Judge William T. Barry of Lexington. He began working with Barry in May 1823 and was admitted to the bar in 1826.

== Career ==
Tibbatts practiced law with Barry. He moved to Newport, Kentucky, and practiced law there.

Tibbatts represented Campbell County in the Kentucky House of Representatives from 1827 to 1829 and from 1841 to 1843. In 1836, he was president of a committee in Campbell County to assess the practicability of building a railroad from Newport to Lexington as part of the Cincinnati and Charleston Railroad.

Tibbatts was elected as a Democrat to the United States House of Representatives, defeating William K. Wall in 1842. He represented the 10th district in that body from 1843 to 1847. He was defeated for re-election in 1847 by John P. Gaines. In his campaign against his relative and Whig candidate William Wright Southgate, they canvassed the district together and played music for people, Tibbatts playing the fiddle left-handed. According to one story on the campaign trail, Southgate insinuated to the public that Tibbatts could play fiddle the fiddle better with his right hand, but only to "nice people" and not to "ignorant people".

In May 1844, Tibbatts advocated for the annexation of Texas. His speech stated that the expansion into Texas would be "favorable to the gradual, peaceable, and constitutional abolition of slavery on this continent. The African race... will gradually recede from the North, which is uncongenial to their natures... and become blended with the mixed population of Mexico". In December 1844, he proposed the annexation of Texas as a state and that they should receive protection from the Union on the House floor. He unsuccessfully proposed in February 1846 a boundary settlement with Mexico along the Sierra Madre Mountains. When war came he supported the Polk administration's war policy.

Tibbatts was appointed by President James K. Polk as a colonel of the 16th Infantry Regiment in the Mexican–American War. He served from March 1847 to August 1848. The regiment were engaged in the campaign to the Rio Grande. They were part of the guard of Monterrey. Tibbatts was appointed as the civil military governor of Monterrey by General Zachary Taylor on September 1, 1847. Following the war, he resumed practicing law in Newport.

== Personal life ==
Tibbatts married Ann Wilkinson Taylor, a daughter of Keturah (née Moss) and General James Taylor, of Newport in 1824 or 1825. Tibbatts had at least two daughters, Susan and Keturah Moss. His daughter Keturah Moss married Kentucky politician and Confederate general George Baird Hodge.

Tibbatts died of cholera on July 5, 1852, at his home in Newport. He was buried in Evergreen Cemetery.

U.S. House of Representatives
| Preceded by Thomas F. Marshall | Member of the U.S. House of Representatives from Kentucky's 10th congressional district March 4, 1843 – March 3, 1847 (obsolete district) | Succeeded by John P. Gaines |
