= Oregon Superintendent of Public Instruction =

Former Oregon elected office

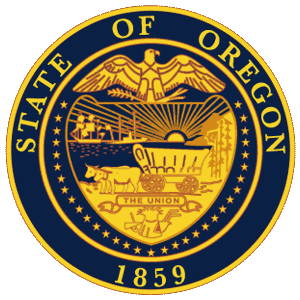
- Great Seal of the State of Oregon

Details of Office
- Branch: Executive
- Type: Nonpartisan
- Selection: Statewide election
- Term: 4 years
- Authority: Constitution
- Established: 1872
- Abolished: 2012

The Superintendent of Public Instruction, sometimes referred to as the State Superintendent of Schools, was a constitutional office within the executive branch of the Oregon state government from 1872 to 2012, when it was eliminated by state law. The superintendent acted as administrative officer of the State Board of Education and was executive head of the Department of Education. The superintendent was elected by the people of Oregon in a nonpartisan statewide ballot for a term of office of four years.

== Duties ==
The superintendent's responsibilities included providing leadership for some 551,290 elementary and secondary students in Oregon’s 198 school districts, as well as those enrolled in public preschool programs, the state Schools for the Blind and the Deaf, programs for children with disabilities and education programs for young people in statewide juvenile corrections facilities.

The superintendent had no direct control over policy, which was set by the Board of Education, and which adopts rules affecting local school districts, who are ultimately responsible for establishing policy at the district level. As chief administrator, however, the superintendent had considerable influence on policy through recommendation to the Board, and certification and licensing authority.

As chief administrative officer for the Department of Education, the superintendent oversaw state funding for schools, and made budget recommendations to the governor's office, subject to action by the state legislature.

== Office elimination ==
As part of a broader education policy overhaul, a 2011 state law eliminated the elected office of Superintendent of Public Instruction and consolidated its functions with the office of Governor. Under the current system, the Governor appoints a Deputy Superintendent of Public Instruction to act as day-to-day administrator of the department. The Deputy Superintendent is a professional position, as opposed to an elected position. The appointee must further have at least five years of experience as a school administrator and is subject to approval by the Oregon Senate. The law enacting the change took effect on June 29, 2012, when Susan Castillo, the last person to be elected Superintendent, resigned to take a job in the private sector.

== List of office holders ==
The following table lists the twenty individuals who held the office of Superintendent of Public Instruction with dates of service:

#	Name	Term
1	Sylvester C. Simpson	January 30, 1873 – September 14, 1874
2	Levi L. Rowland	September 14, 1874 – September 9, 1878
3	Leonard J. Powell	September 9, 1878 – September 11, 1882
4	Ebenezer B. McElroy	September 11, 1882 – January 14, 1895
5	George M. Irwin	January 14, 1895 – January 9, 1899
6	John H. Ackerman	January 9, 1899 – January 3, 1911
7	Lewis R. Alderman	January 4, 1911 – June 28, 1913
8	Julius A. Churchill	July 1, 1913 – June 1, 1926
9	Richard R. Turner	June 1, 1926 – January 3, 1927
10	Charles A. Howard	January 3, 1927 – September 1, 1937
11	Rex Putnam	September 1, 1937 – January 31, 1961
12	Leon P. Minear	February 1, 1961 – March 31, 1968
13	Jesse V. Fasold	April 1, 1968 – July 1, 1968
14	Dale Parnell	July 1, 1968 – April 1, 1974
15	Jesse V. Fasold	April 1, 1974 – January 6, 1975
16	Verne Duncan	January 6, 1975 – November 15, 1989
17	John Erickson	December 18, 1989 – September 30, 1990
18	Norma Paulus	October 1, 1990 – January 3, 1999
19	Stan Bunn	January 4, 1999 – January 5, 2003
20	Susan Castillo	January 6, 2003 – June 29, 2012
