= Kintzing Pritchette =

American politician (1800–1869)

2nd Territorial Governor of Oregon
- In office June 18, 1850 – August 18, 1850
- Preceded by: Joseph Lane
- Succeeded by: John P. Gaines

2nd Secretary of the Oregon Territory
- In office April 9, 1849 – September 18, 1850
- Preceded by: Theophilus Magruder
- Succeeded by: Edward D. Hamilton

1st Michigan Secretary of State
- In office 1835–1838
- Governor: Stevens T. Mason
- Preceded by: Position created
- Succeeded by: Randolph Manning

Personal details
- Born: June 24, 1800 Philadelphia, Pennsylvania, US
- Died: April 12, 1869 (aged 68) At Sea
- Profession: Politician

Kintzing Pritchette (June 24, 1800 – April 12, 1869) was an American politician. He was primarily a political appointee within the federal government's various departments, which at the time included U.S. territories. He is best known as the last Secretary of the Michigan Territory (1835–1838), Secretary of the Oregon Territory (1849–1850), and serving a two-month term as Governor of the Oregon Territory after the resignation of General Joseph Lane. He was appointed to the last two positions by President James K. Polk.

== Michigan ==
In 1835, Pritchette was appointed as the Secretary to the Michigan Territory. He served until 1838, with Michigan becoming a state in 1837, with Pritchette then serving as the first Secretary of State of Michigan.

== Wisconsin Territory ==
Pritchette purchased the title to the lands of Madison, Wisconsin, by June 1839 and began offering plots for sale to the public. In October 1839, Pritchette registered the plat of Madison at the registrar's office of the then-territorial Dane County. At the time he platted the city he was residing in Detroit, Michigan. Also in 1839 he owned the American Hotel in Madison, and attempted to sell the establishment through his attorney, Moses M. Strong.

== Oregon ==
Pritchette came to Oregon from Pennsylvania and served as Territorial secretary from 1849 to 1850. He served as acting governor from June 18, 1850, to August 18, 1850. John P. Gaines had been appointed governor, but did not arrive in Oregon until August 18, when he was sworn in.

In May 1850, judge Orville C. Pratt of the Oregon Supreme Court appointed Pritchette to serve as defense counsel for the Native Americans charged with the Whitman Massacre at their trial in Oregon City, Oregon after the Cayuse War. Shortly after the trial, Pritchette was sworn in as governor. According to the account of U.S. Marshal Joseph Meek, Pritchette ordered Meek to free the five convicted natives. But Meek refused, on the grounds that former governor Lane had already signed their death warrants, and he carried out the executions.

Little is known about Pritchette today, as he is mentioned very little in the media reports of his day. No portraits or photographs have been found of him, earning him the distinction of being Oregon's only "faceless governor". Even the spelling of his last name is disputed, with at least four different spellings depending upon the historical document, including "Prichett", "Pritchett", and "Prichette". His first name is also spelled "Kentzing".

== Later years and death ==
After leaving Oregon he went to Washington, D.C. and worked for the Bureau of Indian Affairs as an agent. In that capacity, he dealt with the Santee Sioux in the Iowa Territory during the Inkpaduta affair in 1857. Pritchette later served as a United States Consul to Fiji at Laucala, where it was said he suffered from delirium tremens.

He died aboard the British-flagged brig Rona en route from Sydney to California via Huaheine in the Society Islands. He died from what was termed "congestion of the brain" on April 12, 1869, at the age of 68, and was buried at sea. His personal effects were lost when the Rona sank on May 2, 1869.

Political offices
Preceded by new office	Secretary of State of Michigan; 1835–1838	Succeeded by Randolph Manning
Preceded by Joseph Lane	Governor of Oregon Territory; 1850	Succeeded by John P. Gaines
