= Levi L. Rowland =

American politician

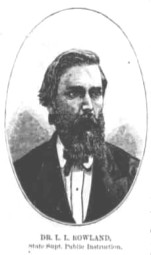

Oregon Superintendent of Public Instruction
- In office September 14, 1874 – September 9, 1878
- Governor: La Fayette Grover; Stephen F. Chadwick
- Preceded by: Sylvester C. Simpson
- Succeeded by: Leonard J. Powell

Superintendent of the Oregon Insane Asylum
- In office July 8, 1891 – August 1, 1895
- Preceded by: Harry Lane
- Succeeded by: D. A. Paine

Personal details
- Born: September 17, 1831 Nashville, Tennessee
- Died: January 19, 1908 (aged 76) Salem, Oregon
- Party: Republican
- Spouse: Emma J. Sanders

Levi Lindsey Rowland FRSE (September 17, 1831 – January 19, 1908) was an American educator and physician in the state of Oregon. A native of Tennessee, he served as the Oregon Superintendent of Public Instruction, president of what became Western Oregon University, and as the superintendent of Oregon's insane asylum, now the Oregon State Hospital. The Republican was also a pastor and farmer.

== Early years ==
Levi Rowland was born in Nashville, Tennessee, on September 17, 1831, the son of Jeremiah and Lucy (née Butler) Rowland. In 1844, he came over the Oregon Trail with his parents and settled in the Yamhill District in the Oregon Country. After farming for a few years he left what was then the Oregon Territory in 1849 and headed south to the gold mines of California during the California Gold Rush. Rowland returned to Oregon in 1851 after accumulating some wealth, but then returned east to Virginia to attend college. In 1856, he graduated from Bethany College in Virginia (now West Virginia) and was ordained as a minister of the Disciples of Christ.

== Educator and doctor ==
After graduation from college, Rowland spent time in the eastern United States as a teacher and as a minister. He married Emma J. Sanders in 1859, and they had five children. That year he returned to what had become the state of Oregon and served as the principal at the Bethel Institute in the Eola Hills in Polk County. Rowland worked as the principal until 1861, but in 1860 he became the superintendent of Polk County's schools. In 1862, he started the first teacher's institute in Oregon.

He then served as the president of Monmouth Christian College (now Western Oregon University) in Monmouth in Polk County from 1866 to 1869. His former school, Bethel Institute, had merged with the later school in 1865, and he became the first president of the school. Rowland left the college in order to start medical school at Willamette University College of Medicine in Salem, and where he graduated in 1872. While still in school he served as a professor at the medical school from 1870 until 1878.

Rowland was elected as Oregon Superintendent of Public Instruction in 1874, while still working as a professor at Willamette. He was the first person elected to that office, as his predecessor had been appointed when the office was still part of the governor's office. He served as state superintendent until 1878 when he then traveled around Europe and Asia. Also during his time in Salem he was the pastor of the First Christian Church. After returning to Oregon from his trip abroad he worked on his farm and started an insurance company, as well as serving as president the State Insurance Society.

== Later years ==
In 1891, he returned to public office when he was elected as the superintendent of the insane asylum, now known as the Oregon State Hospital. A Republican, he served in that office until 1895 when he retired to his country estate at Mehama in Marion County. He later began to suffer from several illnesses and moved to his home in Salem. Levi Lindsey Rowland died on January 19, 1908, in Salem at the age of 76 of dropsy.

== Electoral history ==
1874 general election: Oregon Superintendent of Public Instruction
| Party | Candidate | Votes | % |
|---|---|---|---|
| Republican | Levi L. Rowland | 9,730 | 38.8 |
| Democratic | E. J. Dawne | 9,690 | 38.6 |
| Independent | M. M. Oglesby | 5,657 | 22.6 |

Academic offices
| Preceded by position created | President of Monmouth Christian College; 1866–1869 | Succeeded by Thomas Franklin Campbell |
