= Susan Castillo =

American politician

Oregon Superintendent of Public Instruction
- In office January 6, 2003 – June 29, 2012
- Governor: Ted Kulongoski; John Kitzhaber
- Preceded by: Stan Bunn
- Succeeded by: Position abolished

Member of the Oregon Senate from the 7th district
- In office January 1997 – January 6, 2003
- Preceded by: Pete Sorenson
- Succeeded by: Kurt Schrader

Personal details
- Born: August 14, 1951 (age 74) Los Angeles, California, U.S.
- Party: Democratic
- Spouse: Paul Machu

Susan Castillo (born August 14, 1951) is a politician in the U.S. state of Oregon who most recently served as Superintendent of Public Instruction from 2003 to 2012. A Democrat, she also served from 1997 to 2003 in the Oregon State Senate. Before entering politics, she had pursued a career in broadcast journalism, first for Oregon Public Broadcasting, and later for KVAL-TV in Eugene, Oregon. Upon her resignation as superintendent to pursue an opportunity in the private sector, the position was eliminated as an elective office.

== Life before politics ==
A third-generation Hispanic American, Castillo was born in Los Angeles, and raised there by her mother, who had not finished eighth grade. Castillo cites watching her mother's struggles as a source of her understanding of the importance of education. "Growing up and seeing your parent experience that," she told Northwest Education in a 2006 interview, "you really do make that connection between education and opportunity."

By the mid-1970s, Castillo was working as a secretary in the Affirmative Action Office of Oregon State University (OSU) for its director, Pearl Gray. Gray urged her to consider pursuing a college degree, which she did, graduating from OSU in 1981 with a BA in communications.

In 1982, Castillo began an award-winning broadcast journalism career, joining the reporting team at Oregon Public Radio; she became a reporter for KVAL-TV in 1982. As a journalist, she was frequently called upon to cover or comment on Oregon government and politics.

== Legislative career ==
Castillo was the first Hispanic woman be seated in the Oregon Legislative Assembly, and would later become the first to gain election to a statewide office.

She was first appointed by the Lane County commissioners to fill a vacancy in the Oregon State Senate in 1996, winning re-election in 1998. She became vice-chair of the Education Committee, dealing with such issues as charter schools, teacher tenure and school reform, and was selected an assistant Democratic leader for the 1999 and 2001 legislative sessions. During her tenure as a state senator, she worked to bolster funding for public schools, foster innovation in school programs, and remove barriers to achievement.

In 2001, she gained national press attention when she and State Senator Margaret Carter (D-Portland) filed suit in U.S. District Court to force the Census Bureau to disclose its adjusted statistical count, which they suspected would reveal an undercount of as many as 43,000 Oregonians. They further estimated the cost to the State of Oregon in lost federal funding for social and educational programs over ten years at US$16 million. Judge James A. Redden ruled in favor of the disclosure, and the decision was upheld in 2002 on appeal by the Census Bureau.

== Tenure as State Superintendent of Schools ==
Castillo was elected Superintendent of Public Instruction, a nonpartisan position, in the May, 2002, Oregon primary election. She ran against the incumbent, Stan Bunn, a Republican whose administration had been marred by an ethics scandal, and Rob Kremer, a longtime charter school proponent. She received a majority of votes in the May primary, avoiding a runoff in the November general election.

She was sworn into office on January 6, 2003, to a four-year term to oversee a State Education Department serving more than a half million students in over 1,200 public schools at a time when Oregon had experienced the worst budget shortfalls since World War II. She also faced turmoil within the agency, demoralized by her predecessor's alleged mismanagement and ethics violations, prompting a group of department employees to present the newly elected superintendent with a petition of grievances in a surprise public confrontation less than three weeks after taking office.

Oregon's school funding problems were sufficiently dire that Portland teachers agreed to working ten days without pay, and serious consideration was given to reducing the school year by nearly a full month. The situation received national attention, due in no small part to a series of Doonesbury cartoon strips lampooning the situation. "Oregon is the poster child of what is going on in the states because of declining revenues," Jan Chambers of the Oregon Education Association is quoted as saying, continuing, "It's ghastly here."

=== Administration ===
In a position which has little control over school policies and curricula, which largely remain the province of local school districts, nor school funding, which is solely dependent upon local levies and state support levels set by the legislature, Castillo quickly focused her attention on six priorities for her administration:

- increasing education system accountability;
- closing the gaps in achievement for low income and minority students;
- raising literacy levels at all grades;
- improving middle and high Schools;
- creating community schools; and
- enhancing Department of Education efficiency.

A key to Castillo's promotion of effective teaching practices has been to showcase schools that have made big gains and facilitating their sharing effective strategies through department sponsored workshops and presentations.

Concurrently, Castillo restructured the Oregon Department of Education around three core functions: accountability; leadership; and school improvement.

Castillo claims schools have improved during her term of office, despite severe budget constraints which predate her election to the post, and test scores do show modest increases since she took office, and stronger gains in closing the so-called "achievement gap." She states that her biggest disappointment in office was not being able to persuade lawmakers to put more money into education. Perhaps in evidence of this frustration, and despite the fact that they are members of the same party, she has not shied away from criticizing Governor Ted Kulongoski over what she has seen as inadequate funding for education in his proposed budgets.

Through most of her first term as Superintendent, Castillo attempted to bolster the effectiveness of the Mastery Certificate programs, part of earlier educational reforms of her predecessor, Norma Paulus, which had failed to live up to expectations. After watching limited resources being consumed in administration of the programs, she proposed in 2006 that they be phased out in favor of higher standards for high school graduation. Castillo's advocacy led to the State Board of Education's adoption of the Oregon Diploma, a redesign of Oregon's graduation standards, and the elimination of the CIM/CAM system.

=== Controversies ===
Castillo's administration of the Department of Education has not been without controversy. In November, 2001, the state Attorney General's office notified the education department a new state law prohibited providing funds for "transition services" for youthful offenders leaving jail. In addition to the new legislation restricting funding to classroom instruction, questions were raised over contracts being awarded without bid, and other financial irregularities. Education department spokesmen responded that the mismanagement issues were due to inadequate management practices of the previous administration which were being addressed under Castillo's leadership, and that the decision to continue the funding was within the discretion of the Superintendent, who was not bound by the notification from the Attorney General's office.

In 2006, she was criticized by parents groups and the press for certifying a 2006 Oregon School Activities Association (OSAA) reclassification and redistricting plan based solely on school size. The plan requires lengthy and costly trips by athletes to compete against distant schools, often involving lost instruction time. She has defended the action as required under existing state law. The matter is in the courts, several districts having filed suit.

In 2007, Castillo and her department were involved in a high-profile dispute with a computer-based testing vendor that left school districts statewide scrambling to meet federal No Child Left Behind (NCLB) requirements. Castillo and Deputy Superintendent Ed Dennis blamed the vendor, Pennsylvania-based Vantage Learning, for the situation. State officials filed a lawsuit on behalf of the Oregon Department of Education, claiming Vantage Learning was in breach of contract. In November 2008, however, an Oregon jury ruled against the state and awarded Vantage Learning more than $3.5 million.

In 2008, an accounting scandal surfaced at the Oregon Department of Education. The agency's director of accounting services was accused of embezzling nearly $1 million intended for charter schools, anti-drug youth initiatives and school-based health programs. The scandal raised questions about the level of oversight and the strength of internal controls within the agency.

=== 2006 re-election ===
In December 2005, Castillo announced she would run for a second term amidst widespread speculation she was considering a gubernatorial or congressional bid. She was challenged by Deb Andrews, an Oak Grove education consultant, who said Oregon schools fail to match curriculum to individual students. She was also critical of reading instruction in most Oregon schools, which she proposed should employ phonics-based reading programs and Direct Instruction, a highly scripted teaching method used in a handful of Oregon schools. Castillo, with the backing of the Oregon Education Association, received 67% of the votes cast, and began her second four-year term in January 2007.

=== 2010 re-election ===
In October 2009, Castillo indicated she would run for another term, and defeated State Representative Ron Maurer in a close election in May 2010 to win a third term. In 2011, a state law eliminated the position of elected Superintendent of Public Instruction, effective with the end of Castillo's term or resignation, and made the Governor the Superintendent, with the responsibility of appointing a Deputy Superintendent of Public Instruction. Castillo resigned in June 2012 to become a vice president of Project Lead the Way, a provider of middle and high school math, science, and engineering curriculum.

== Distinctions and awards ==
- 2004 - Named one of the "100 Most Influential Hispanics" in America, Hispanic Business Magazine.

== Trivia ==
- While still a broadcast journalist, Castillo appeared in the 1993 film, Fire in the Sky playing a TV news anchor.
