= John P. Gaines =

American politician

John Pollard Gaines
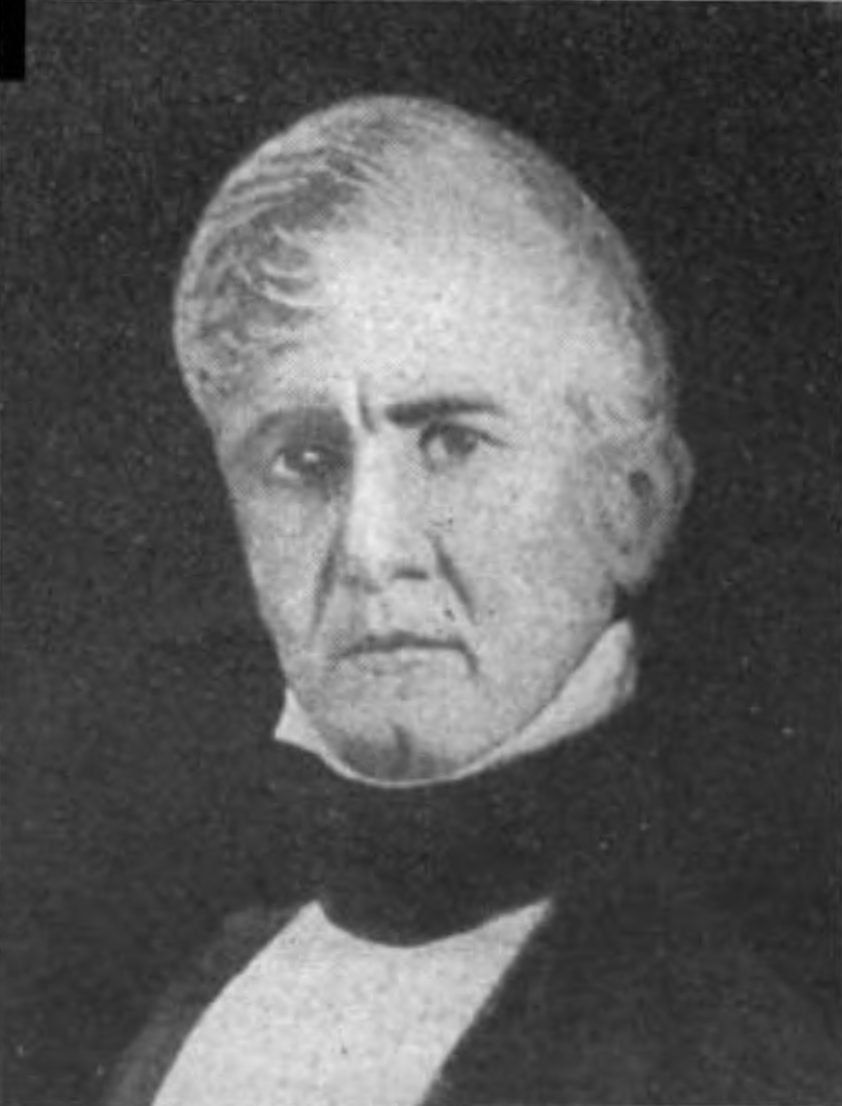

3rd Territorial Governor of Oregon
- In office August 18, 1850 – May 16, 1853
- President: Millard Fillmore
- Preceded by: Kintzing Prichette
- Succeeded by: Joseph Lane (as Acting Territorial Governor)

Member of the U.S. House of Representatives from Kentucky's 10th district
- In office March 4, 1847 – March 3, 1849
- Preceded by: John W. Tibbatts
- Succeeded by: Richard H. Stanton

Personal details
- Born: September 22, 1795 Augusta County, Virginia, U.S.
- Died: December 9, 1857 (aged 62) Salem, Oregon, U.S.
- Party: Whig
- Spouses: Elizabeth Kinkead Gaines; Margaret B. Wands Gaines
- Profession: Politician, Lawyer

John Pollard Gaines (September 22, 1795 – December 9, 1857) was a U.S. military and political figure. He was a Whig member of the United States House of Representatives, representing Kentucky from 1847 to 1849, and he served as Governor of the Oregon Territory from 1850 to 1853, stepping down after a turbulent term in office. He was the owner of Margaret Garner, whose enslavement and sexual assault is the basis for Toni Morrison's novel, Beloved.

== Biography ==
=== Early life ===
Gaines was born September 22, 1795, in Augusta County, Virginia, to Abner Gaines and Elizabeth Matthews. His grandfathers and great-grandfather served during the American Revolutionary War. He received an education and studied law, and volunteered in the War of 1812. In 1819, Gaines married Elizabeth Kincaid from Kentucky He was a lawyer practicing in Boone County, Kentucky, and served as a state legislator in Kentucky during the 1820s and 1830s.

=== Military ===
Gaines volunteered and was appointed the rank of Major during the Mexican–American War in 1846. During the war in 1847 he was General Winfield Scott's aide-de-camp. He and some 80 soldiers were captured at Encarnacion in January 1847. They were held captive in Mexico City until August. While a prisoner, he was elected to the 30th United States Congress from Kentucky's 10th Congressional District. He served one term (March 4, 1847, to March 3, 1849) and lost reelection.

=== Governor of Oregon Territory ===
He was a supporter of President Zachary Taylor, who was elected in 1848. At the end of his term as congressman he returned to Boone County, and in October 1849 he accepted the position of Governor of the Territory of Oregon. He received the appointment after the positions of territorial secretary and governor were declined by another Taylor supporter, Abraham Lincoln, whose term in Congress had also ended earlier that year. He traveled to Oregon with Territorial Secretary Edward D. Hamilton aboard the sloop Falmouth.

From the start, Gaines's tenure in office proved to be difficult. He arrived in the territory by ship, losing two of his daughters to yellow fever at Santa Catarina Island, Brazil. Shortly after arriving in the territory, his wife died in 1851 after falling off a horse. His political life would prove to be just as turbulent.

During his tenure in June 1850 he became a member of an Indian Commission set up by the United States government to negotiate treaties with the Native American tribes west of the Cascade Mountains in the territory. This commission was created because the Donation Land Act in 1850 allowed citizens to settle up to 640 acres (2.6 km^{2}) and the government wanted the lands west of the Cascades for settlement and to move the tribes to Eastern Oregon. However, Gaines and his fellow commissioners Alonzo A. Skinner and Beverly S. Allen were only able to get treaties signed that allowed the tribes to remain on the west side and in the foothills of the Willamette Valley. The commission ratified 19 treaties and was then disbanded in February 1851.

His tenure was marked with fierce partisanship, facing opposition from the press and the Democratic-controlled territorial legislature. Gaines unsuccessfully tried to keep the territorial capital at Oregon City. The governor also pushed for other Whig policies that were often at odds with popular sentiment. These unpopular positions, coupled with fierce partisanship, cemented a perception that Gaines was an Easterner, out of touch with Pacific Coast needs and attitudes.

In 1853, Gaines left office, succeeded by the Democrat Joseph Lane, who assumed the reins of government for three days. Undeterred by the past hostilities of the Oregon electorate, he chose to stay, remarrying and settling on a farm just outside Salem. His second marriage was to Margaret B. Wands in 1853. In 1854 he and two of his sons (Archibald and Abner) drove over a herd of over 200 head from Kentucky and Arkansas across the plains to Oregon, including 35 purebred Durham, in order to help start a beef cattle industry in Oregon.

=== Slave owner ===
In 1825 Gaines purchased a plantation called Maplewood in Kentucky. Around a dozen enslaved persons worked this plantation, including the mother of Margaret Garner, who was born in 1833. Aged five or six, Margaret was put to work in Gaines' house, where her duties involved looking after his children. In 1849 Gaines permitted her to marry Robert Garner, whose owner, James Marshall, occupied a neighboring plantation.

In 1849 Gaines left Kentucky to become governor of the Oregon Territory, and therefore sold Maplewood and its enslaved residents to his younger brother Archibald Gaines. In 1856 Margaret, her husband and four children escaped to Cincinnati, but a posse quickly tracked them down. As they were surrounded, Margaret tried to kill herself and her children (successfully killing her two-year-old daughter), rather than be returned to slavery. Garner's life inspired Toni Morrison's novel Beloved.

=== Later life ===
Gaines ran for the U.S. House of Representatives in 1855, but lost to Lane. Governor Gaines' appointment to the governorship indirectly lead to the death of several of his family, including his daughters Harriet and Florella, who died in 1850. In 1851 his wife Elizabeth went for a ride on the Clatsop plains and was thrown from her horse, which had become frightened by a wagon. Mrs. Gaines was crushed beneath the wagon's wheels and died from the injuries she sustained. After this tragedy his remaining children were sent back to relatives in the East.

About 15 months after his wife's death, Gaines remarried, joining in matrimony with Margaret B. Wands, one of five schoolteachers recently sent to the state.

John P. Gaines died December 9, 1857, and is interred in the Old Pioneer Cemetery at Salem, Oregon.

== Footnotes ==
U.S. House of Representatives
Preceded by John W. Tibbatts	Member of the U.S. House of Representatives from Kentucky's 10th congressional district March 4, 1847 – March 3, 1849 (obsolete district)	Succeeded by Richard H. Stanton
Political offices
Preceded by Kintzing Prichette	Territorial Governor of Oregon; 1850–1853	Succeeded by Joseph Lane; Acting Territorial Governor
