= Lewis R. Alderman =

Oregon state employee

Lewis R. Alderman (October 20, 1872 – 1965) was an American educator who worked for multiple education agencies in the U.S. state of Oregon. Born and raised in Dayton, he served as Oregon's Superintendent from January 4, 1911, to June 28, 1913.
