= Samuel L. Simpson =

American poet (1845–1899)

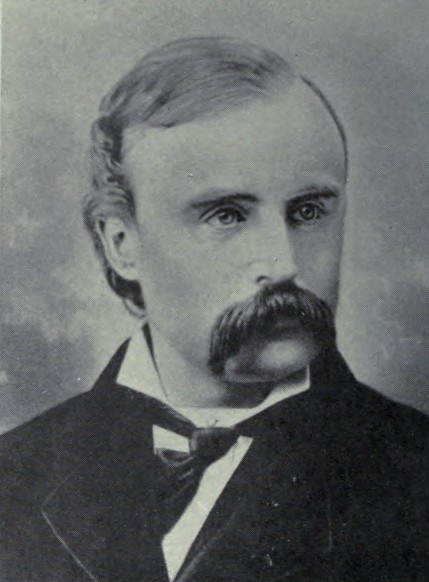

Samuel Leonidas Simpson (1845–1899) was an American poet, known for his works about the U.S. state of Oregon. Simpson was born in Missouri on November 10, 1845, moving to Oregon with his parents the following year. His parents were Ben and Nancy (née Cooper) Simpson; he married Julia Humphrey in 1867. Simpson graduated from Willamette University in 1866. He served for four months that year as editor of the Salem Statesman, until his father was compelled to sell the newspaper. He worked as an attorney for several years. He published poems and short stories in regional periodicals. He died in June 1899. His works were posthumously collected in a volume titled The Gold-Gated West: Songs and Poems, published in 1910.
