= Rex Putnam =

American politician

Oregon Superintendent of Public Instruction
- In office September 1, 1937 – January 31, 1961
- Governor: Charles Martin; Charles A. Sprague; Earl Snell; John H. Hall; Douglas McKay; Paul L. Patterson; Elmo Smith; Robert D. Holmes; Mark Hatfield
- Preceded by: Charles A. Howard
- Succeeded by: Leon P. Minear

Personal details
- Born: June 7, 1890 Buffalo Gap, South Dakota U.S.
- Died: May 17, 1967 (aged 76) Portland, Oregon
- Party: Democratic
- Spouse: Elinor
- Occupation: Educator

Rex Putnam (June 7, 1890 – May 17, 1967) was an American educator from the state of Oregon. A former classroom teacher and district superintendent, Putnam served as Oregon Superintendent of Public Instruction for nearly 25 years, the longest-serving state school superintendent in Oregon history. Following his retirement in 1961, a new high school in his adopted hometown of Milwaukie, Oregon was named Rex Putnam High School in his honor.

== Early life and career ==
Born in Buffalo Gap, South Dakota, Putnam received a Bachelor of Arts degree from the University of Oregon in 1915 and began teaching in Springfield, Oregon that year. He taught high school science in Tacoma, Washington for five years before returning to Oregon, where he became superintendent of the Redmond School District in Redmond in 1923. He received a master's degree from the University of Oregon in 1929, and in 1932, he was named superintendent of schools in Albany. He would later receive a doctorate from Lewis & Clark College in 1945.

== Oregon Superintendent of Public Instruction ==
In 1937, Oregon Superintendent of Public Instruction Charles A. Howard resigned to become president of Eastern Oregon Normal School (now Eastern Oregon University), and governor Charles Martin appointed Putnam to replace Howard. In 1938, Putnam was elected to a full term as a Democrat. In 1942, the position was changed to non-partisan, and Putnam was re-elected five more times, each time unopposed. In his nearly 25 years as state school superintendent, Putnam was an active contributor to academic articles about education and an influential voice for Oregon schools among nationwide educational organizations. During his tenure, Oregon's educational system expanded to include vocational education programs, special needs and gifted education, programs for Native Americans, along with expanded curriculum and other programs. School funding issues were also a focus of Putnam's tenure. He resigned from office in early 1961 due to health concerns.

== Personal and legacy ==
In 1962, a high school then under construction in Milwaukie, where Putnam lived, was named Rex Putnam High School in his honor. The school opened in 1963. Putnam died after a short illness in 1967. He and his wife Elinor had two sons, one of whom was killed in action during World War II.
