= 32nd Oregon Legislative Assembly =

Oregon legislature, 1923

←	31st Legislative Assembly	33rd Legislative Assembly	→
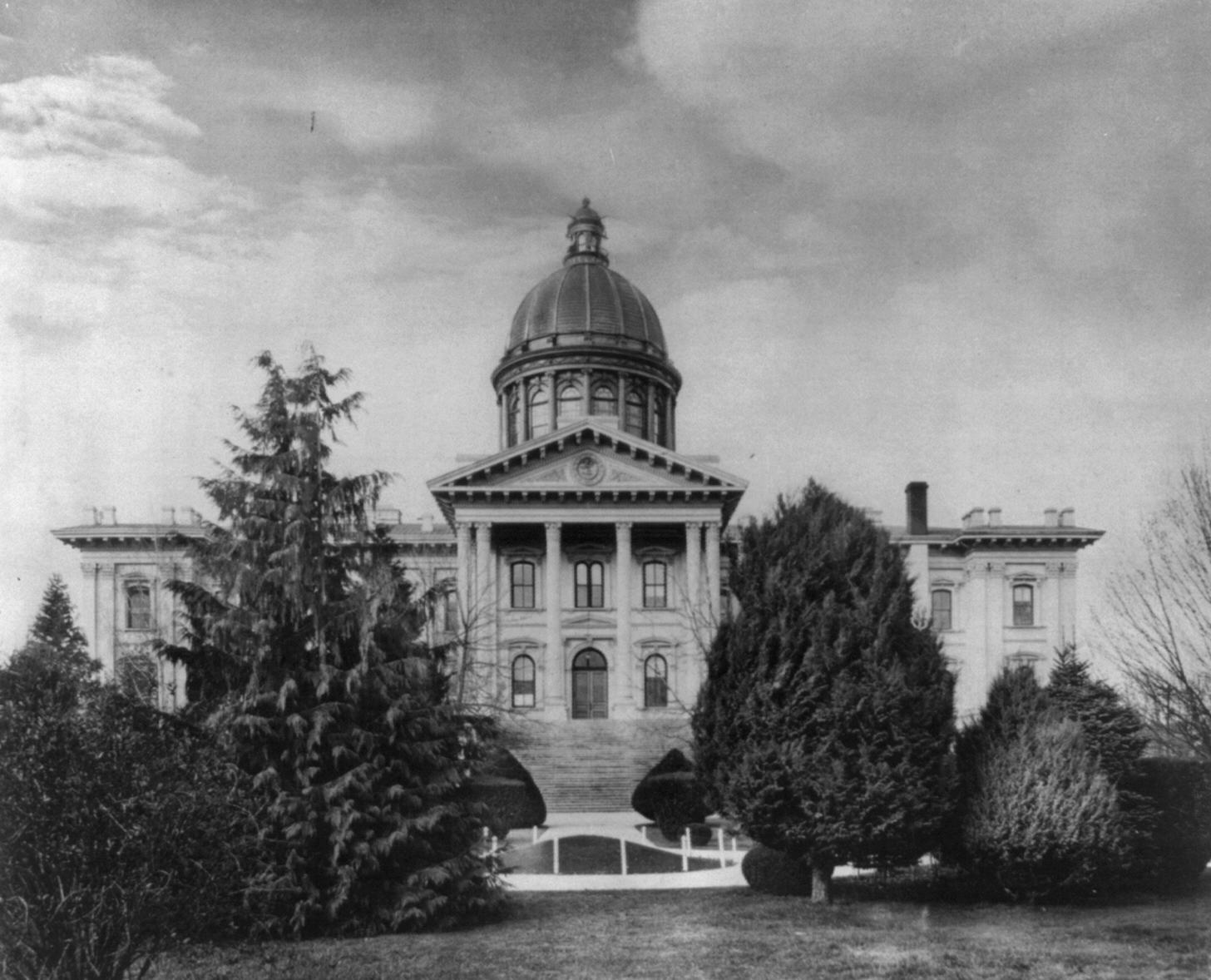
- The legislature took place in the second Oregon State Capitol, seen here in 1909

Overview
- Legislative body: Oregon Legislative Assembly
- Jurisdiction: Oregon, United States
- Meeting place: Oregon State Capitol
- Term: 1923–1924

Oregon State Senate
- Members: 30 Senators
- Party control: Republican Party

Oregon House of Representatives
- Members: 60 Representatives
- Speaker of the House: K. K. Kubli
- Party control: Republican Party

The 32nd Oregon Legislative Assembly was the biannual session of the bicameral state legislature held in the state of Oregon in 1923.

== House members ==
Speaker of the House: K. K. Kubli (R–18 Portland)

District	Name	Residence	Counties	Party
1	Lloyd T. Reynolds	Salem	Marion	Republican
1	Thomas B. Kay	Salem	Marion	Republican
1	Otto J. Wilson	Salem	Marion	Republican
2	Sterling H. Goin	Jefferson	Linn	Democratic
2	A. K. McMahan	Albany	Linn	Democratic
3	Edward F. Bailey	Junction City	Lane	Democratic
3	Ben F. Keeney	Eugene	Lane	Republican
3	H. C. Wheeler	Pleasant Hill	Lane	Republican
4	D. S. Beals	Riddle	Douglas	Republican
4	J. M. Throne	Roseburg	Douglas	Republican
5	T. T. Bennett	Marshfield	Coos	Republican
6	S. P. Peirce	Sixes	Coos/Curry	Republican
7	Theodore P. Cramer, Jr.	Grants Pass	Josephine	Republican
8	John H. Carkin	Medford	Jackson	Republican
8	Ralph P. Cowgill	Central Point	Jackson	Republican
9	L. N. Blowers	Hood River	Hood River	Republican
10	Claude Buchanan	Corvallis	Benton	Republican
11	D. E. Fletcher	Independence	Polk	Republican
12	W. C. Bolton	Maupin	Wasco	Republican
13	Arthur McPhillips	McMinnville	Yamhill	Democratic
13	Ed Cary	Lafayette	Yamhill	Republican
14	B. F. Jones	Newport	Lincoln	Republican
15	Loyal M. Graham	Forest Grove	Washington	Republican
15	L. M. Hesse	Beaverton	Washington	Republican
15	Edward Schulmerich	Hillsboro	Washington	Republican
16	Philip Hammond	Oregon City	Clackamas	Republican
16	M. J. Lee	Canby	Clackamas	Republican
16	George G. Randall	New Era	Clackamas	Republican
17	James A. Lackey	Ontario	Malheur	Democratic
18	George A. Lovejoy	Portland	Multnomah	Democratic
18	L. H. Adams	Portland	Multnomah	Republican
18	Cyril G. Brownell	Portland	Multnomah	Republican
18	E. R. Campbell	Portland	Multnomah	Republican
18	Herbert Gordon	Portland	Multnomah	Republican
18	Thomas H. Hurlburt	Portland	Multnomah	Republican
18	Oliver B. Huston	Portland	Multnomah	Republican
18	R. J. Kirkwood	Portland	Multnomah	Republican
18	K. K. Kubli	Portland	Multnomah	Republican
18	Louis Kuehn	Portland	Multnomah	Republican
18	D. C. Lewis	Portland	Multnomah	Republican
18	Mrs. C. B. Simmons	Portland	Multnomah	Republican
18	William F. Woodward	Portland	Multnomah	Republican
19	E. N. Hurd	Astoria	Clatsop	Republican
19	James W. Mott	Seaside	Clatsop	Republican
20	Sherman Miles	St. Helens	Columbia	Democratic
21	Denton G. Burdick	Redmond	Crook/Deschutes/Jefferson/Klamath/Lake	Republican
21	J. M. Ezell	Klamath Falls	Crook/Deschutes/Jefferson/Klamath/Lake	Republican
21	H. J. Overturf	Bend	Crook/Deschutes/Jefferson/Klamath/Lake	Republican
22	Alfred J. Smith	Pendleton	Morrow/Umatilla	Republican
23	L. L. Mann	Milton	Umatilla	Republican
23	S. A. Miller	Milton	Umatilla	Republican
24	Charles A. Hunter	Wallowa	Union/Wallowa	Republican
25	A. R. Hunter	Island City	Union	Democratic
26	Charles J. Shelton	Barker	Baker	Republican
27	R. A. Ford	Dayville	Grant/Harney	Republican
28	W. F. Jackson	Moro	Gilliam/Sherman/Wheeler	Democratic
28	R. J. Carsner	Spray	Gilliam/Sherman/Wheeler	Republican
29	Rollie W. Watson	Tillamook	Tillamook	Republican
30	Fred J. Meindl	Portland	Clackamas/Multnomah	Republican

== Senate members ==
Senate President: Jay H. Upton (R–17 Prineville)

District	Senator	Residence	Counties	Party
1	Sam H. Brown	Gervais	Marion	Republican
1	Alex M. LaFollette	Gervais	Marion	Republican
2	S. M. Garland	Lebanon	Linn	Democratic
3	J. S. Magladry	Dorena	Lane	Republican
4	Fred Fisk	Eugene	Lane/Linn	Democratic
5	B. L. Eddy	Roseburg	Douglas	Republican
6	George W. Dunn	Ashland	Jackson	Republican
7	J. C. Smith	Grants Pass	Josephine	Republican
8	Charles Hall	Marshfield	Coos/Curry	Republican
9	A. J. Johnson	Corvallis	Benton/Polk	Republican
10	Peter Zimmerman	Yamhill	Yamhill	Republican
11	William G. Hare	Hillsboro	Washington	Republican
12	F. J. Tooze	Oregon City	Clackamas	Republican
13	Henry L. Corbett	Portland	Multnomah	Republican
13	Robert S. Farrell	Portland	Multnomah	Republican
13	George W. Joseph	Portland	Multnomah	Republican
13	Milton R. Klepper	Portland	Multnomah	Republican
13	Gus C. Moser	Portland	Multnomah	Republican
13	Isaac E. Staples	Portland	Multnomah	Republican
14	W. J. H. Clark	Portland	Clackamas/Columbia/Multnomah	Republican
15	W. S. Kinney	Astoria	Clatsop	Republican
16	John R. Nickelsen	Hood River	Hood River	Republican
17	Jay H. Upton	Bend	Crook/Deschutes/Jefferson/Klamath/Lake	Republican
18	R. J. Carsner	Spray	Gilliam/Sherman/Wheeler	Republican
19	J. H. Taylor	Pendleton	Morrow/Umatilla/Union	Democratic
20	Roy W. Ritner	Pendleton	Umatilla	Republican
21	Bruce Dennis	La Grande	Union/Wallowa	Republican
22	Charles W. Ellis	Burns	Grant/Harney/Malheur	Republican
23	W. H. Strayer	Baker	Baker	Democratic
24	C. J. Edwards	Tillamook	Tillamook/Washington/Yamhill	Republican

== See also ==
- Government of Oregon

Preceded by 31st legislature	32nd Oregon Legislative Assembly; 1923–1924	Succeeded by 33rd legislature
