= 33rd Oregon Legislative Assembly =

←	32nd Legislative Assembly	34th Legislative Assembly	→
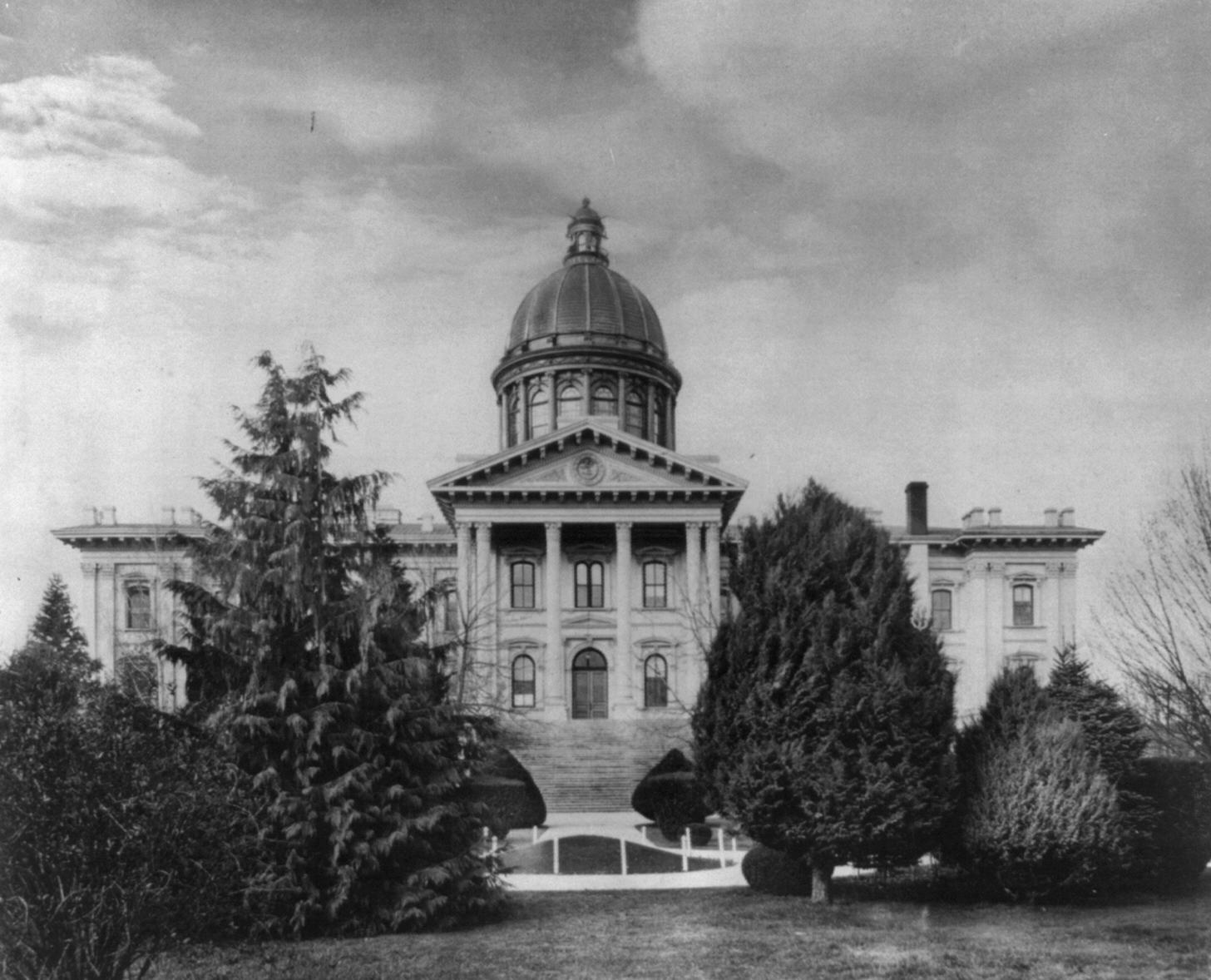
- The legislature took place in the second Oregon State Capitol, seen here in 1909

Overview
- Legislative body: Oregon Legislative Assembly
- Jurisdiction: Oregon, United States
- Meeting place: Oregon State Capitol
- Term: 1925
- Website: www.oregonlegislature.gov

Oregon State Senate
- Members: 30 Senators
- Senate President: Gus C. Moser (R)
- Party control: Republican Party of Oregon

Oregon House of Representatives
- Members: 60 Representatives
- Speaker of the House: Denton G. Burdick (R)
- Party control: Republican Party of Oregon

The 33rd Oregon Legislative Assembly was the legislative session of the Oregon Legislative Assembly that convened on January 12, 1927 and adjourned February 26, 1925.

== Senate ==
Affiliation	Members
Democratic	4
Republican	26

== Senate Members ==
Composition of the Senate
Senator	Residence	Party
W. W. Banks	Portland	Republican
A. G. Beals	Tillamook	Republican
Sam H. Brown	Gervais	Republican
R. R. Butler	The Dalles	Republican
R. J. Carsner	Spray	Republican
W. J. H. Clark	Portland	Republican
Henry L. Corbett	Portland	Republican
George E. Davis	Vale	Republican
Bruce Dennis	La Grande	Republican
George W. Dunn	Ashland	Republican
B. L. Eddy	Roseburg	Republican
Fred Fisk	Eugene	Democratic
S. M. Garland	Lebanon	Democratic
Charles Hall	Marshfield (Now Coos Bay)	Republican
William G. Hare	Hillsboro	Republican
A. J. Johnson	Corvallis	Republican
George W. Joseph	Portland	Republican
Mary Strong Kinney	Astoria	Republican
Milton R. Klepper	Portland	Republican
A. M. LaFollett	Gervais	Republican
J. S. Magladry	Eugene	Republican
Edward W. Miller	Grants Pass	Republican
Gus C. Moser	Portland	Republican
Roy W. Ritner	Pendleton	Republican
Isaac E. Staples	Portland	Republican
W. H. Strayer	Baker	Democratic
H. J. Taylor	Pendleton	Democratic
F. J. Tooze	Oregon City	Republican
Jay H. Upton	Bend	Republican
Peter C. Zimmerman	Yamhill	Republican

== House ==
Affiliation	Members
Democratic	4
Republican	56
Total	60

== House Members ==
Composition of the House
House Member	Residence	Party
J. O. Bailey	Portland	Republican
Edward G. Bates	Gearhart	Republican
J. E. Bennett	Portland	Republican
Claude Buchanen	Corvallis	Republican
Denton G. Burdick	Redmond	Republican
John H. Carkin	Medford	Republican
John B. Coffey	Portland	Republican
A. M. Collier	Klamath Falls	Republican
Ralph P. Cowgill	Medford	Republican
Theodore P. Cramer Jr.	Grants Pass	Republican
Walter S. Fisher	Roseburg	Democratic
M. Fitzmaurice	Condon	Republican
R. A. Ford	Dayville	Republican
W. V. Fuller	Dallas	Republican
Fred W. German	Portland	Republican
Herbert Gordon	Portland	Republican
Loyal M. Graham	Forest Grove	Republican
George S. Hall	Sherwood	Republican
R. S. Hamilton	Bend	Republican
Philip Hammond	Oregon City	Republican
James H. Hazlett	Hood River	Democratic
R. A. Hercher	Dillard	Republican
L. M. Hesse	Beaverton	Republican
Emmett Howard	Eugene	Republican
Albert R. Hunter	Island City	Democratic
Charles A. Hunter	Wallowa	Republican
Thomas H. Hurlburt	Portland	Republican
Howard D. Kilham	Portland	Republican
Dal M. King	Myrtle Point	Republican
R. J. Kirkwood	Portland	Republican
D. C. Lewis	Portland	Republican
Frank J. Lonergan	Portland	Republican
L. L. Mann	Pendleton	Republican
Mark D. McCallister	Salem	Republican
Fred J. Meindl	Portland	Republican
S. A. Miller	Milton	Republican
James W. Mott	Salem	Republican
W. C. North	Portland	Republican
Ivan E. Oakes	Ontario	Republican
S. P. Pierce	Sixes	Republican
E. O. Potter	Eugene	Republican
George C. Randall	Oregon City	Republican
Lloyd T. Reynolds	Salem	Republican
Albert S. Roberts	The Dalles	Republican
Allen G. Rushlight	Portland	Republican
Walter W. Russell	McMinnville	Republican
F. W. Settlemier	Woodburn	Republican
Charles J. Shelton	Baker	Democratic
M. S. Schrock	Milwaukie	Republican
A. R. Shumway	Milton	Republican
L. L. Swan	Albany	Republican
J. H. Teegarden	Yamhill	Republican
C. A. Tom	Rufus	Republican
H. C. Wheeler	Pleasant Hill	Republican
Otto J. Wilson	Salem	Republican
George P. Winslow	Tillamook	Republican
William F. Woodward	Portland	Republican
