= 34th Oregon Legislative Assembly =

←	33rd Legislative Assembly	35th Legislative Assembly	→
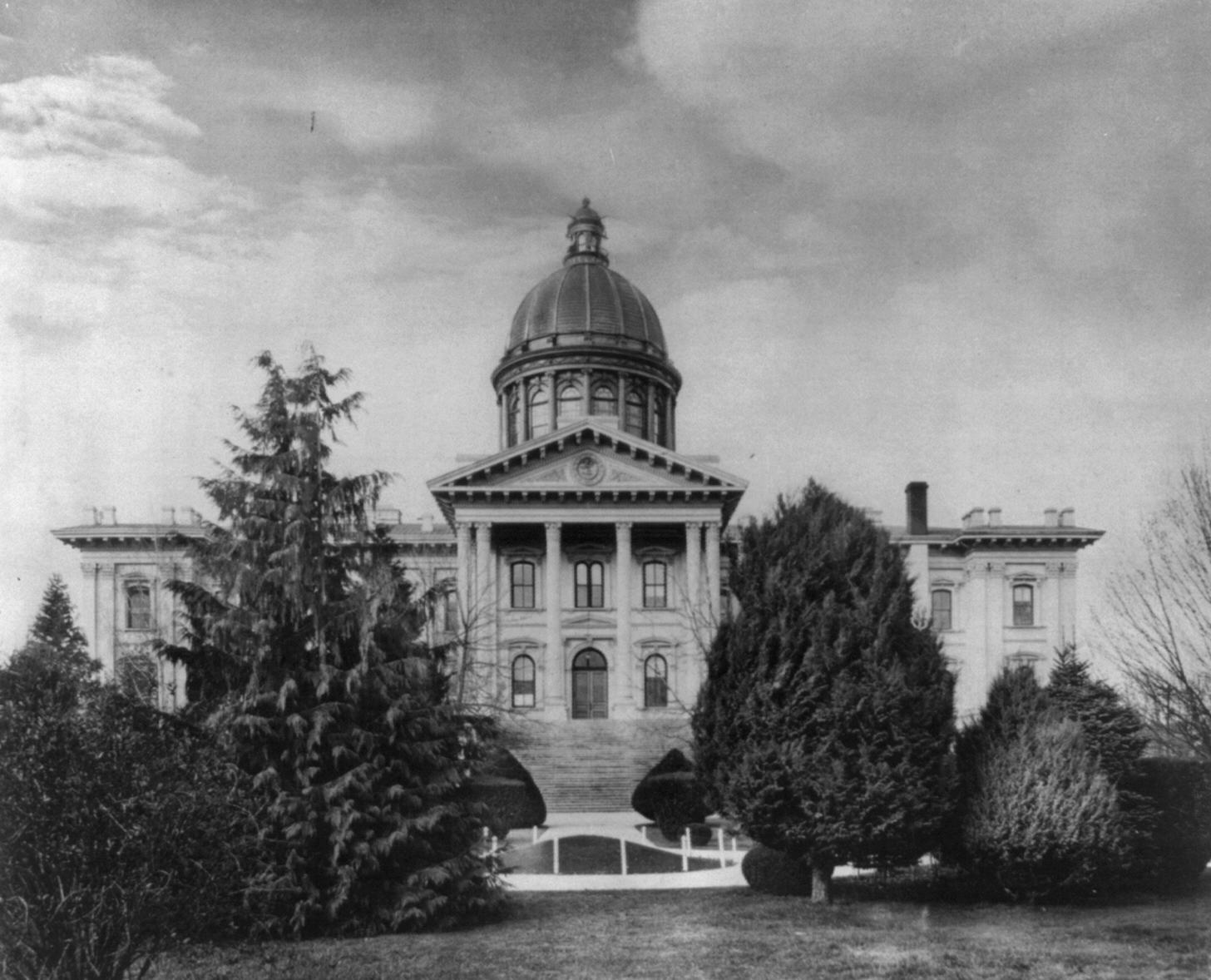
- The legislature took place in the second Oregon State Capitol, seen here in 1909

Overview
- Legislative body: Oregon Legislative Assembly
- Jurisdiction: Oregon, United States
- Meeting place: Oregon State Capitol
- Term: 1927
- Website: www.oregonlegislature.gov

Oregon State Senate
- Members: 30 Senators
- Senate President: Henry L. Corbett (R)
- Party control: Republican Party of Oregon

Oregon House of Representatives
- Members: 60 Representatives
- Speaker of the House: John H. Carkin (R)
- Party control: Republican Party of Oregon

The 34th Oregon Legislative Assembly was the legislative session of the Oregon Legislative Assembly that convened on January 10, 1927 and adjourned February 25, 1927.

== Senate ==
Affiliation	Members
Democratic	3
Republican	27

== Senate Members ==
Composition of the Senate
Senator	Residence	Party
Edward F. Bailey	Junction City	Democratic
W. W. Banks	Portland	Republican
A. G. Beals	Tillamook	Republican
John B. Bell	Eugene	Republican
Sam H. Brown	Gervais	Republican
R. R. Butler	The Dalles	Republican
Clarence Butt	Newberg	Republican
R. J. Carsner	Spray	Republican
Henry L. Corbett	Portland	Republican
George E. Davis	Vale	Republican
George W. Dunn	Ashland	Republican
Joe E. Dunne	Portland	Republican
B. L. Eddy	Roseburg	Republican
Herbert J. Elliott	Perrydale	Republican
Charles Hall	Marshfield (Now Coos Bay)	Republican
William G. Hare	Hillsboro	Republican
Albert R. Hunter	La Grande	Democratic
Linn E. Jones	Oregon City	Republican
George W. Joseph	Portland	Republican
Fred E. Kiddle	Island City	Republican
Milton R. Klepper	Portland	Republican
L. L. Mann	Pendleton	Republican
Willard L. Marks	Albany	Republican
Edward W. Miller	Grants Pass	Republican
Gus C. Moser	Portland	Republican
A. W. Norblad	Astoria	Republican
Lloyd T. Reynolds	Salem	Republican
Isaac E. Staples	Portland	Republican
W. H. Strayer	Baker	Democratic
Jay H. Upton	Bend	Republican

== House ==
Affiliation	Members
Democratic	4
Republican	56
Total	60

== House Members ==
Composition of the House
House Member	Residence	Party
A. E. Allen	Wallowa	Republican
J. O. Bailey	Portland	Republican
J. D. Billingsley	Ontario	Republican
William M. Briggs	Ashland	Republican
Earl C. Bronaugh Jr.	Portland	Republican
Claude Buchanen	Corvallis	Republican
Denton G. Burdick	Redmond	Republican
H. H. Chindgren	Molalla	Republican
J. F. Clark	West Linn	Republican
A. M. Collier	Klamath Falls	Republican
Theodore P. Cramer Jr.	Grants Pass	Republican
F. W. Eppinger	Baker	Republican
Walter S. Fisher	Roseburg	Democratic
Fred W. German	Portland	Republican
John B. Giesy	Salem	Republican
R. L. Gile	Roseburg	Republican
Loyal M. Graham	Forest Grove	Republican
James H. Hazlett	Hood River	Democratic
Wilbur Henderson	Portland	Republican
Emmett Howard	Eugene	Republican
C. A. Hunter	Wallowa	Republican
Dorr E. Keasey	Portland	Republican
Dal M. King	Myrtle Point	Republican
Louis Kuehn	Portland	Republican
Charles R. La Follett	Cornelius	Republican
D. C. Lewis	Portland	Republican
Frank J. Lonergan	Portland	Republican
Hector Macpherson Sr.	Albany	Republican
Mark McCallister	Salem	Republican
John B. McCourt	Portland	Republican
Lynn S. McCready	Eugene	Republican
Archie McGowan	Burns	Republican
Arthur McPhillips	McMinnville	Democratic
Fred J. Meindel	Portland	Republican
S. A. Miller	Milton	Republican
James W. Mott	Salem	Republican
W. C. North	Portland	Republican
J. S. Norvell	Helix	Republican
James D. Olson	Portland	Republican
Mark A. Paulson	Silverton	Republican
A. T. Peterson	Toledo	Republican
S. P. Pierce	Sixes	Republican
E. O. Potter	Eugene	Republican
Albert S. Roberts	The Dalles	Republican
Allen G. Rushlight	Portland	Republican
Walter W. Russell	McMinnville	Republican
Edward Schulmerich	Hillsboro	Republican
Joseph H. Scott	Pendleton	Democratic
F. W. Settlemier	Woodburn	Republican
Charles T. Sievers	Gladstone	Republican
Earl W. Snell	Arlington	Republican
S. L. Stewart	Rickreall	Republican
L. L. Swan	Albany	Republican
C. A. Tom	Rufus	Republican
H. H. Weatherspoon	Elgin	Republican
George P. Winslow	Tillamook	Republican
