= 31st Oregon Legislative Assembly =

Term of state legislature in Oregon, US

←	30th Legislative Assembly	32nd Legislative Assembly	→
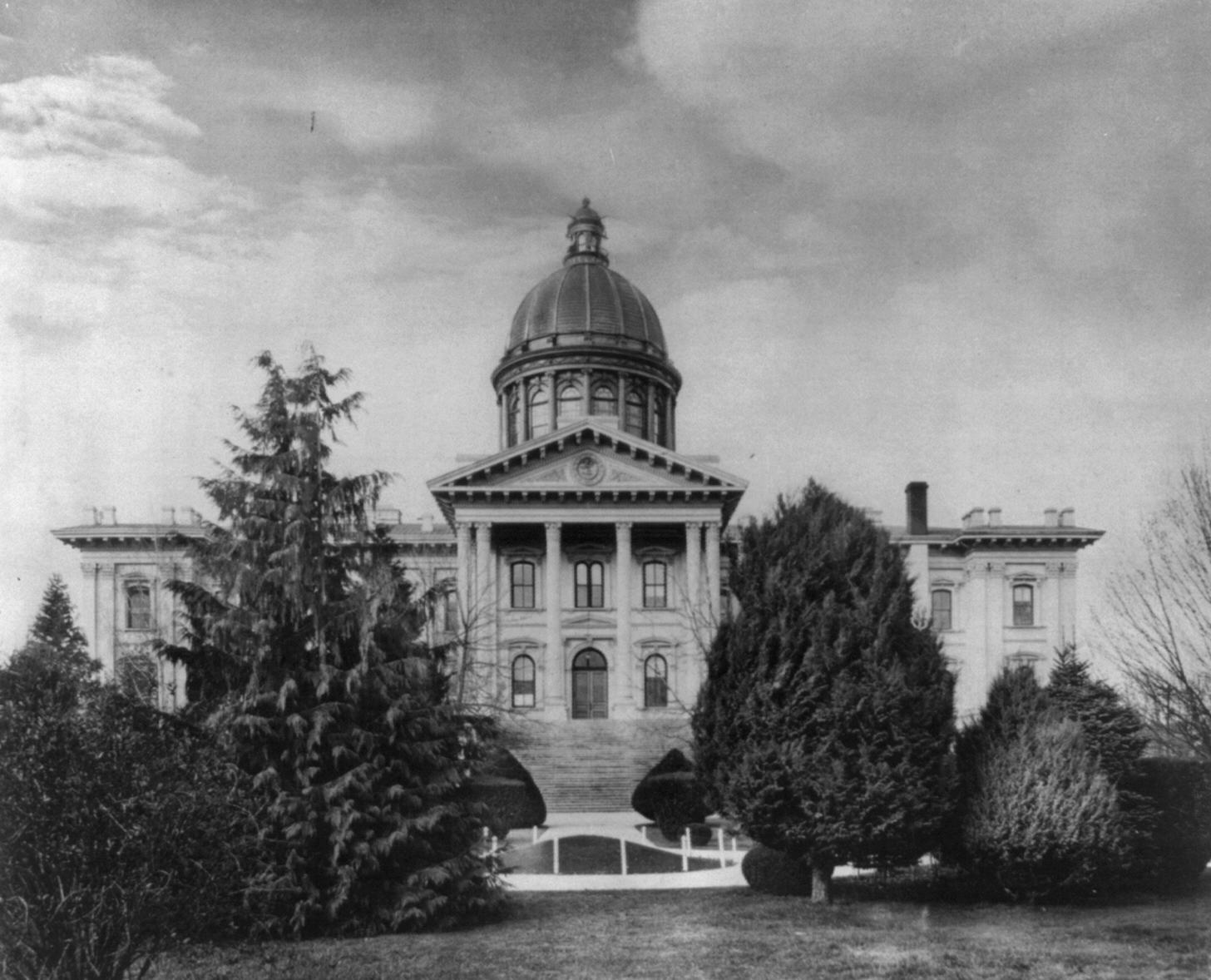
- The legislature took place in the second Oregon State Capitol, seen here in 1909

Overview
- Legislative body: Oregon Legislative Assembly
- Jurisdiction: Oregon, United States
- Meeting place: Oregon State Capitol
- Term: 1921
- Website: www.oregonlegislature.gov

Oregon State Senate
- Members: 30 Senators
- Senate President: Roy W. Ritner (R)
- Party control: Republican Party of Oregon

Oregon House of Representatives
- Members: 60 Representatives
- Speaker of the House: Louis E. Bean (R)
- Party control: Republican Party of Oregon

The 31st Oregon Legislative Assembly was the legislative session of the Oregon Legislative Assembly that convened on January 10, 1921 and adjourned February 25, 1921. There was a special session held from December 19 to December 24, 1921.

== Senate ==
Affiliation	Members
Democratic	1
Republican	27
Independent	2
Total	30

=== Senate members ===
Composition of the Senate
Senator	Residence	Party
W. W. Banks	Portland	Republican
John B. Bell	Eugene	Republican
Bruce Dennis	La Grande	Republican
Colon R. Eberhard	La Grande	Republican
B. L. Eddy	Roseburg	Republican
C. J. Edwards	Tillamook	Republican
Charles W. Ellis	Burns	Republican
Robert S. Farrell	Portland	Republican
John Gill	Portland	Republican
Charles Hall	Marshfield (Now Coos Bay)	Republican
William G. Hare	Hillsboro	Republican
Wilson T. Hume (Note: Hume died October 8, 1921 and did not participate in the special session.)	Portland	Republican
Walter B. Jones	Eugene	Independent
George W. Joseph	Portland	Republican
Louis Lachmund	Salem	Republican
Alex M. La Follett	Gervais	Independent
Gus C. Moser	Portland	Republican
John R. Nickelsen	Hood River	Republican
Albin Walter Norblad Sr.	Astoria	Republican
I. L. Patterson	Salem	Republican
F. H. Porter	Halsey	Republican
Roy W. Ritner	Pendleton	Republican
O. B. Robertson	Condon	Republican
Thomas F. Ryan	Oregon City	Republican
Dr. J. C. Smith	Grants Pass	Republican
Isaac E. Staples	Portland	Republican
W. H. Strayer	Baker	Democratic
C. M. Thomas	Medford	Republican
Jay H. Upton	Prineville	Republican
William T. Vinton	McMinnville	Republican

== House ==
Affiliation	Members
Democratic	2
Republican	58
Total	60

=== House members ===
Composition of the House of Representatives
Representative	Residence	Party
Robert S. Acheson	Shedd	Republican
Seward D. Allen	Eugene	Republican
F. R. Beals	Tillamook	Republican
Louis E. Bean	Eugene	Republican
E. H. Belknap	Monroe	Republican
T. T. Bennett	Marshfield	Republican
Denton G. Burdick	Redmond	Republican
R. J. Carsner	Spray	Republican
E.V. Carter	Ashland	Republican
Ed Cary	Carlton	Republican
Charles Childs	Brownsville	Republican
Frank Davey	Salem	Republican
Herbert Egbert	The Dalles	Republican
Earl E. Fisher	Beaverton	Republican
D. E. Fletcher	Independence	Republican
A. B. Flint	Beaverton	Republican
P. J. Gallagher	Ontario	Republican
Herbert Gordon	Portland	Republican
W. T. Gordon	Eugene	Republican
Philip Hammond	Oregon City	Republican
Charles C. Hindman	Portland	Republican
Charles F. Hopkins	Roseburg	Republican
O. W. Hosford	Portland	Republican
F. L. Hubbard	Baker	Republican
Albert R. Hunter	Island City	Democratic
E. N. Hurd	Seaside	Republican
George W. Hyatt	Enterprise	Republican
J. N. Johnston	Grants Pass	Republican
Thomas B. Kay	Salem	Republican
William S. (Mrs.) Kinney	Astoria	Republican
Franklin F. Korell	Portland	Republican
K. K. Kubli	Portland	Republican
C. M. LaFollett	Amity	Republican
J. D. Lee	Portland	Republican
Barge E. Leonard	Portland	Republican
David H. Looney	Jefferson	Republican
Walter G. Lynn	Portland	Republican
Arthur H. Marsh	Lookingglass	Republican
Ivan G. Martin	Salem	Republican
W. R. McDonald	Portland	Republican
E. C. McFarland	Portland	Republican
Sherman M. Miles	St. Helens	Democratic
S. A. Miller	Milton	Republican
W. C. North	Portland	Republican
H. J. Overturf	Bend	Republican
S. P. Peirce	Sixes	Republican
J. C. Perry	Salem	Republican
Perry O. Powell	Monmouth	Republican
Oren R. Richards	Portland	Republican
Albert S. Roberts	The Dalles	Republican
F. D. Shank	Boring	Republican
Benjamin C. Sheldon	Medford	Republican
A. E. Shiria	Sutherlin	Republican
Frank Sloan	Stanfield	Republican
William M. Stone	Oregon City	Republican
W. C. Templeton	Brownsville	Republican
Harvey Wells	Portland	Republican
A. E. Westcott	Banks	Republican
C. E. Woodson	Heppner	Republican
A. M. Wright	Moro	Republican
