= Senator La Follette =

Senator La Follette may refer to:

- Alex M. LaFollette (1845–1927), Oregon State Senate
- Doug La Follette (born 1940), Wisconsin State Senate
- Robert M. La Follette Sr. (1855–1925), U.S. Senator from Wisconsin
- Robert M. La Follette Jr. (1895–1953), U.S. Senator from Wisconsin and son of Robert Sr.
