= 1934 Oregon gubernatorial election =

- November 6, 1934
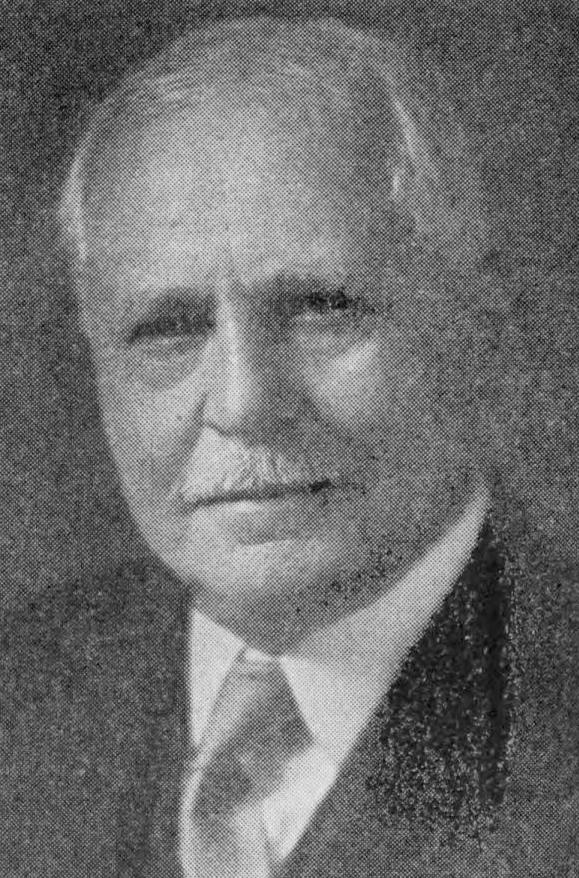

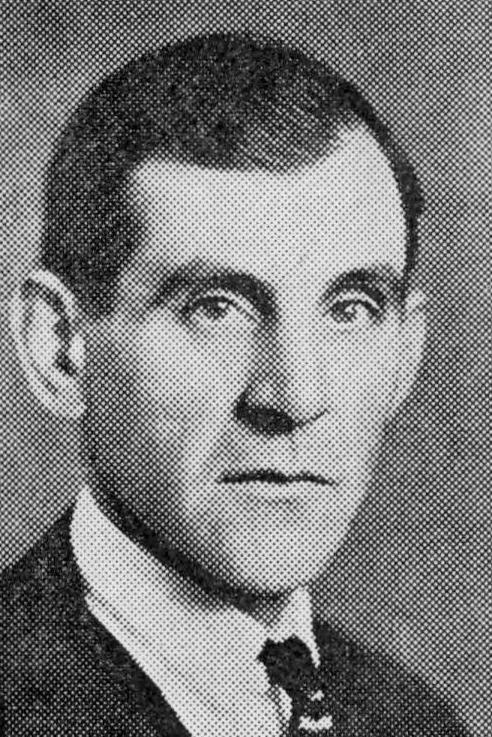

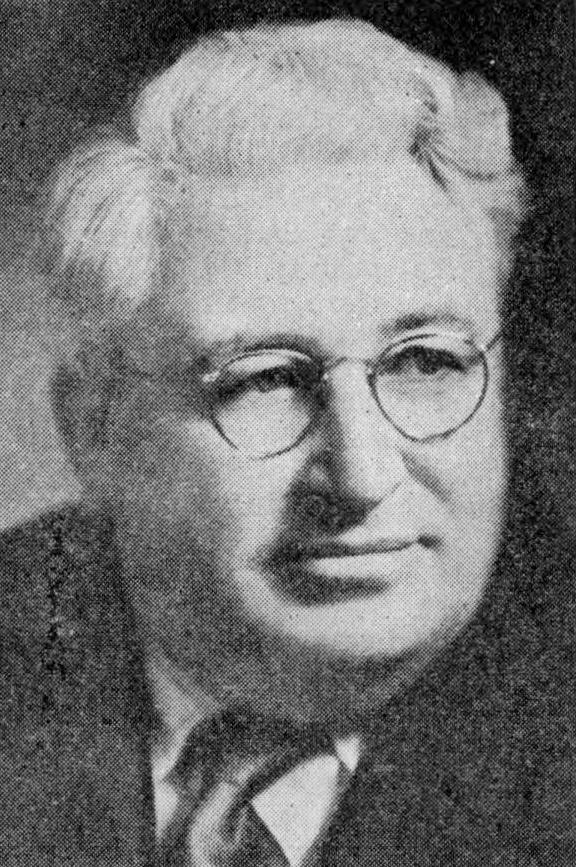
Nominee	Charles H. Martin	Peter Zimmerman	Joe E. Dunne
Party	Democratic	Independent	Republican
Popular vote	116,677	95,519	86,923
Percentage	38.57%	31.57%	28.73%
- County results Martin: 30–40% 40–50% 50–60% Zimmerman: 30–40% 40–50% Dunne: 30–40% 40–50% 50–60%
Governor before election
Julius Meier
Independent
Elected Governor
Charles H. Martin
Democratic

The 1934 Oregon gubernatorial election took place on November 6, 1934, to elect the governor of the U.S. state of Oregon. Democrat Charles H. Martin, who retired from the United States House of Representatives to run for governor, won a plurality over Republican Oregon State Senator Peter Zimmerman (who ran as an Independent), Republican nominee Joe E. Dunne, also a state senator, and several minor candidates. Willis Mahoney unsuccessfully sought the Democratic nomination, while Rufus C. Holman unsuccessfully sought the Republican nomination. Oregon would not elect another Democratic governor until 1956. As of 2026, this is also the last gubernatorial election in which Malheur County supported the Democratic candidate.

== Primary election ==
Oregon held primary elections on May 18, 1934.

=== Democratic party ===
Representative Charles H. Martin defeated Willis Mahoney for the Democratic nomination.

==== Candidates ====
- Willis Mahoney, mayor of Klamath Falls
- Charles H. Martin, representative from Oregon's 3rd district

==== Results ====
Democratic primary results
Party	Candidate	Votes	%
Democratic	Charles H. Martin	46,372	58.36%
Democratic	Willis Mahoney	32,962	41.48%
Democratic	Scattering	126	0.16%
Total votes		79,460	100.00%

=== Republican party ===
State senator Joe E. Dunne emerged victorious from a crowded primary field.

==== Candidates ====
- Sam H. Brown, member of Oregon State Senate
- Joe E. Dunne, member of Oregon State Senate
- Rufus C. Holman, Treasurer of Oregon
- Frank J. Lonergan, member of Oregon House of Representatives
- Ulysses G. McAlexander, military officer

==== Results ====
Republican primary results
Party	Candidate	Votes	%
Republican	Joe E. Dunne	42,563	30.00%
Republican	Sam H. Brown	29,913	21.08%
Republican	Rufus C. Holman	27,804	19.60%
Republican	Ulysses G. McAlexander	20,793	14.65%
Republican	Frank J. Lonergan	18,121	12.77%
Republican	Scattering	2,695	1.90%
Total votes		141,889	100.00%

== General election ==
=== Candidates ===
- Joe E. Dunne, Republican
- Charles H. Martin, Democratic
- Peter Zimmerman, Independent
- Harry J. Correll, Independent
- Abraham M. Silverman, Independent
- Hank E. Wirth, Independent

=== Results ===
1934 Oregon gubernatorial election
Party	Candidate	Votes	%	±%
Democratic	Charles H. Martin	116,677	38.57%	+13.47%
Independent	Peter Zimmerman	95,519	31.57%	
Republican	Joe E. Dunne	86,923	28.73%	+9.91%
Independent	Harry J. Correll	1,475	0.49%	
Independent	Abraham M. Silverman	1,379	0.46%	
Independent	Hank E. Wirth	536	0.18%	
Write-in	Scattering	12	0.00%	
Total votes		302,521	100.00%	
Plurality		21,158	6.99%	
Democratic gain from Independent		Swing	+36.41%	

=== Results by county ===
In addition to this being the most recent election in which Malheur County backed the Democratic candidate, Jefferson County, Josephine County, and Sherman County have only voted Democratic once since this election. (Note: In 1998) As of 2026, this is the last gubernatorial election in which a Democrat was elected without carrying Lincoln County.

County	Charles H. Martin Democratic		Peter Zimmerman Independent		Joe E. Dunne Republican		All Others Independent		Margin (Note: Since Zimmerman ran ahead of Dunne, the margin's are Martin over Zimmerman unless otherwise noted.)		Total votes cast
County	#	%	#	%	#	%	#	%	#	%	Total votes cast
Baker	2,394	46.60%	1,111	21.63%	1,576	30.68%	56	1.09%	818 (Note: Martin's margin over Dunne)	15.92%	5,137
Benton	2,138	37.02%	996	17.24%	2,617	45.31%	25	0.43%	-479 (Note: Dunne's margin over Martin)	-8.29%	5,776
Clackamas	4,994	32.01%	6,807	43.63%	3,644	23.35%	158	1.01%	-1,813	-11.62%	15,603
Clatsop	2,957	48.22%	1,230	20.06%	1,807	29.47%	138	2.25%	1,150	18.75%	6,132
Columbia	1,924	34.94%	1,950	35.41%	1,582	28.73%	51	0.93%	-26	-0.47%	5,507
Coos	3,180	42.48%	1,632	21.80%	2,489	33.25%	184	2.46%	691	9.23%	7,485
Crook	461	39.03%	220	18.63%	487	41.24%	13	1.10%	-26	-2.20%	1,181
Curry	503	40.60%	320	25.83%	368	29.70%	48	3.87%	135	10.90%	1,239
Deschutes	1,747	40.85%	951	22.24%	1,499	35.05%	80	1.87%	248	5.80%	4,277
Douglas	2,818	37.05%	1,539	20.24%	3,142	41.31%	106	1.39%	-324	-4.26%	7,605
Gilliam	486	44.42%	232	21.21%	370	33.82%	6	0.55%	116	10.60%	1,094
Grant	557	33.35%	472	28.26%	613	36.71%	28	1.68%	-56	-3.35%	1,670
Harney	567	42.44%	393	29.42%	357	26.72%	19	1.42%	174	13.02%	1,336
Hood River	1,145	44.45%	511	19.84%	905	35.13%	15	0.58%	240	9.32%	2,576
Jackson	5,086	49.78%	2,013	19.70%	3,016	29.52%	102	1.00%	2,070	20.26%	10,217
Jefferson	332	45.73%	122	16.80%	265	36.50%	7	0.96%	67	9.23%	726
Josephine	2,079	51.03%	754	18.51%	1,193	29.28%	48	1.18%	886	21.75%	4,074
Klamath	2,140	23.34%	2,602	28.38%	4,101	44.73%	325	3.54%	-1,499 (Note: Dunne's margin over Zimmerman)	-16.35%	9,168
Lake	817	44.14%	283	15.29%	716	38.68%	35	1.89%	101	5.46%	1,851
Lane	6,634	37.45%	5,797	32.73%	5,135	28.99%	146	0.82%	837	4.73%	17,712
Lincoln	1,149	32.97%	1,191	34.18%	1,093	31.36%	52	1.49%	-42	-1.21%	3,485
Linn	3,207	34.89%	3,004	32.68%	2,901	31.56%	79	0.86%	203	2.21%	9,191
Malheur	1,108	42.68%	573	22.07%	876	33.74%	39	1.50%	232	8.94%	2,596
Marion	6,537	33.40%	8,227	42.03%	4,633	23.67%	176	0.90%	-1,690	-8.63%	19,573
Morrow	492	38.89%	340	26.88%	416	32.89%	17	1.34%	76	6.01%	1,265
Multnomah	44,059	40.19%	36,862	33.62%	27,675	25.24%	1,040	0.95%	7,197	6.56%	109,636
Polk	2,057	38.17%	1,952	36.22%	1,340	24.87%	40	0.74%	105	1.95%	5,389
Sherman	378	37.43%	291	28.81%	337	33.37%	4	0.40%	41	4.06%	1,010
Tillamook	1,218	32.13%	1,527	40.28%	1,015	26.77%	31	0.82%	-309	-8.15%	3,791
Umatilla	3,147	46.13%	1,336	19.58%	2,283	33.47%	56	0.82%	864	12.66%	6,822
Union	1,882	39.50%	1,432	30.05%	1,391	29.19%	60	1.26%	450	9.44%	4,765
Wallowa	605	28.74%	740	35.15%	736	34.96%	24	1.14%	-4 (Note: Zimmerman's margin over Dunne)	-0.19%	2,105
Wasco	1,763	45.82%	677	17.59%	1,382	35.91%	26	0.68%	381	9.90%	3,848
Washington	3,201	33.90%	3,861	40.89%	2,291	24.26%	90	0.95%	-660	-6.99%	9,443
Wheeler	413	34.97%	151	12.79%	596	50.47%	21	1.78%	-183	-15.50%	1,181
Yamhill	2,502	31.06%	3,420	42.46%	2,076	25.77%	57	0.71%	-918	-11.40%	8,055
Total	116,677	38.57%	95,519	31.57%	86,923	28.73%	3,402	1.12%	21,158	6.99%	302,521

==== Counties that flipped from Independent to Democratic ====
- Baker
- Clatsop
- Coos
- Curry
- Deschutes
- Gilliam
- Hood River
- Jackson
- Jefferson
- Josephine
- Lake
- Malheur
- Morrow
- Multnomah
- Sherman
- Umatilla
- Union
- Wasco

==== Counties that flipped from Republican to Democratic ====
- Harney

==== Counties that flipped from Democratic to Independent ====
- Lincoln

==== Counties that flipped from Democratic to Republican ====
- Benton

==== Counties that flipped from Independent to Republican ====
- Crook
- Douglas
- Grant
- Klamath
