= Effie Simmons =

American suffragist and politician

Euphemia Comstock Simmons (née Euphemia Dicken Comstock 1874–1961), known as Effie Simmons, was an American suffragist, politician, and the first woman from Multnomah County to serve in the Oregon House of Representatives. She was the fourth woman to serve in the Oregon House.

== Early life ==
Effie Simmons was born Euphemia Dicken Comstock in Santa Cruz, California in 1874. Her mother's name was Adeline. Her sister Alta had physical disabilities, and Adeline's entire small estate was bequeathed to her for her continued support. Her sister Edna graduated from the San Jose Normal School.

== Political career ==
Simmons joined Portland Woman's Club (founded in 1895) in 1908, and served as its president from 1916 to 1918. In 1912, she supported the club's participation in the successful effort (the sixth such attempt) to have the word "male" removed from the voting privileges section of the Oregon Constitution. She later joined the National American Woman Suffrage Association (NAWSA), which became the League of Women Voters.

Simmons helped found the Oregon State Suffrage Alliance (later known as the Oregon Equal Suffrage Alliance) in 1915. The group worked with the NAWSA to achieve nationwide suffrage. During World War I, she suspended her suffrage efforts to work with the American Red Cross and raise money for liberty bonds. She submitted letters from the front from her son Rouse, who had joined the French army, to The Oregonian. In 1919, the 19th Amendment to the U.S. Constitution was passed and she helped convince Governor Ben W. Olcott, along with Alta Smith Corbett and Grace Harbison Torrey (Mrs. Harry Beal Torrey) to call a special session of the Oregon Legislative Assembly to vote on ratification.

She was elected to the Oregon House of Representatives in 1922.

In 1924 she ran for the Oregon Senate.

== Personal life ==
Effie married Clayton B. Simmons, later the vice-president of an oil-investment securities company, in 1897. They had three children: Rouse (b. 1899), Helen (b. 1905), and Frances (b. 1908). They later divorced. Clayton died in 1924.

== See also ==
- 32nd Oregon Legislative Assembly
- Chinese American women's suffrage in Oregon
- Oregon Equal Suffrage Amendment
