= Doc C. Lewis =

Texas state legislator

Doc C. Lewis (1843 – ?) was a farmer and state legislator in Texas. A Republican, he served from 1881 to 1883 during the Seventeenth Texas Legislature in the Texas House of Representatives. He was one of four African American members of the Texas House at the time.

He lived in Wharton County and was 37 when elected to the Texas House.

== See also ==
- African American officeholders from the end of the Civil War until before 1900
