= List of presidents of the Oregon State Senate =

President of the Senate of Oregon
- Great Seal of the State of Oregon

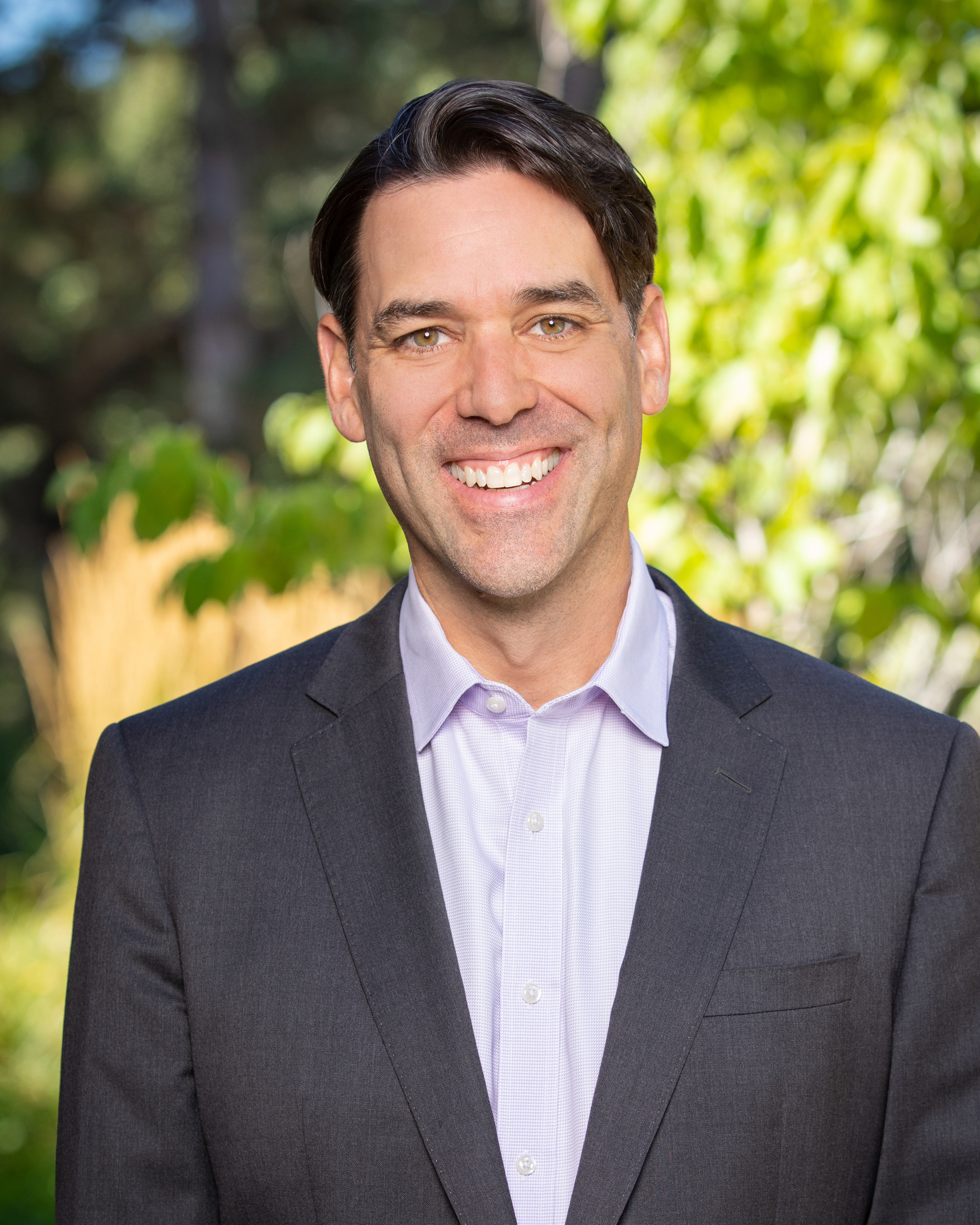
- Incumbent; Rob Wagner since January 9, 2023
- Succession: Third

This is a complete list of people who have served as president of the Oregon State Senate.

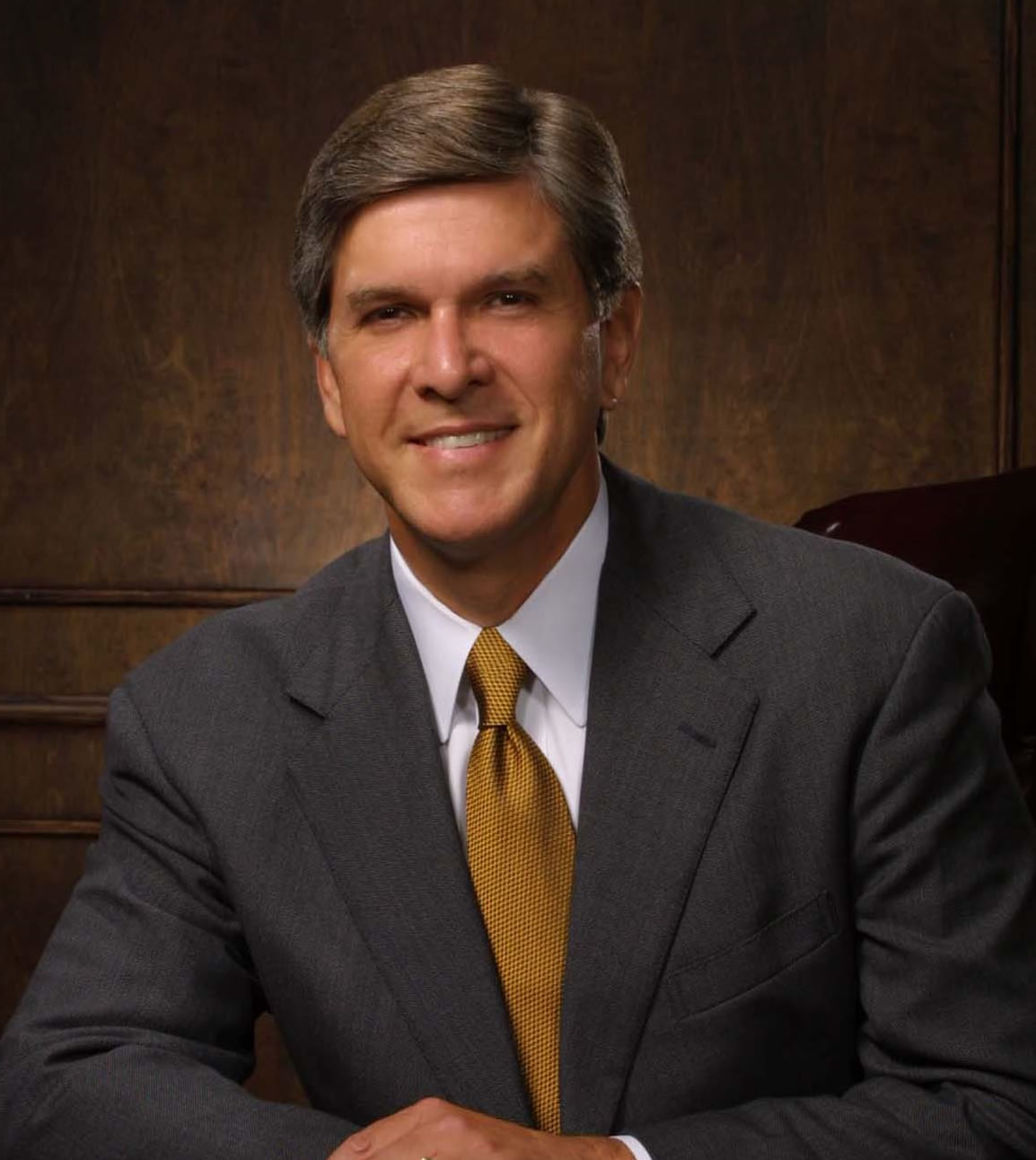
Gordon Smith

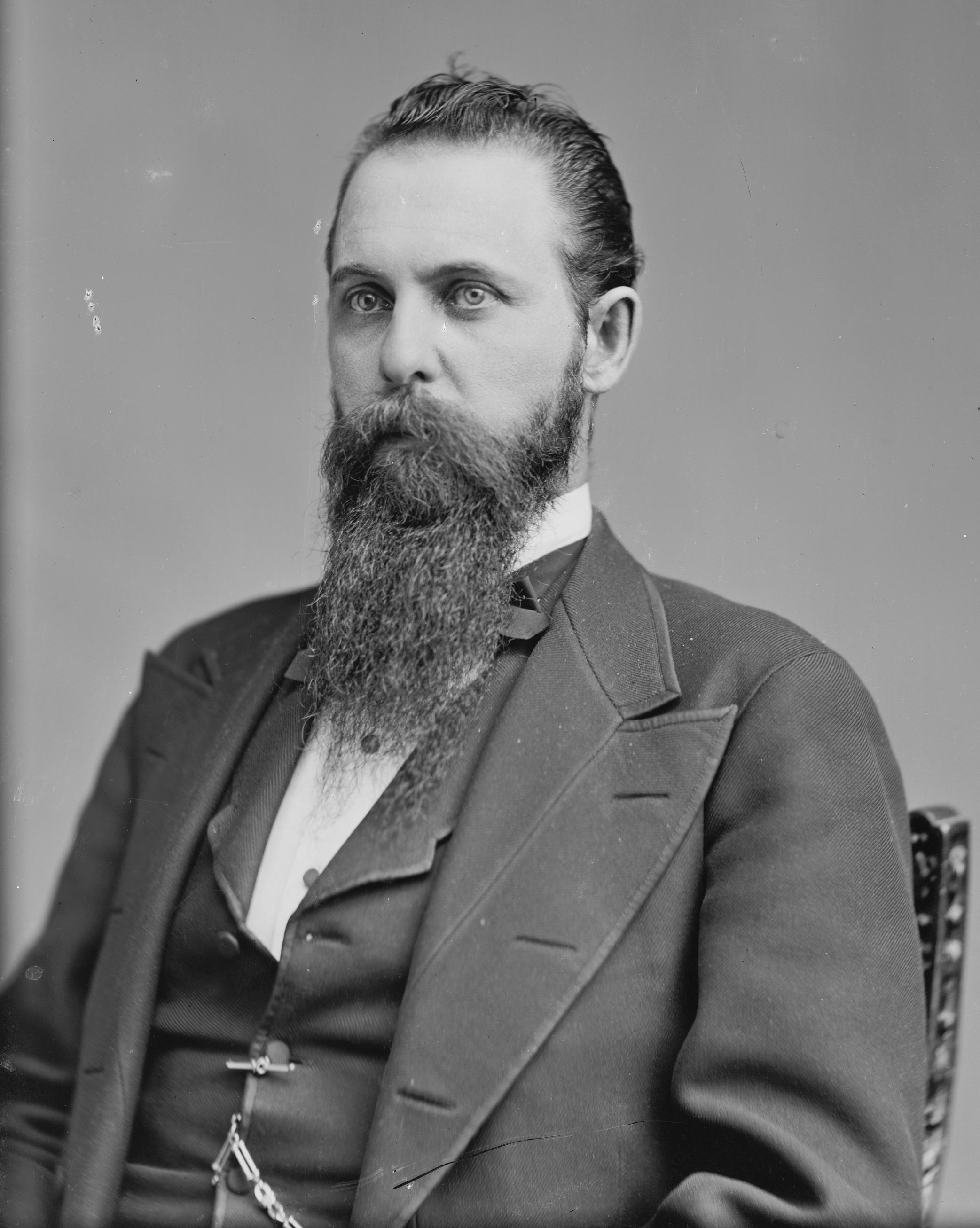
John H. Mitchell

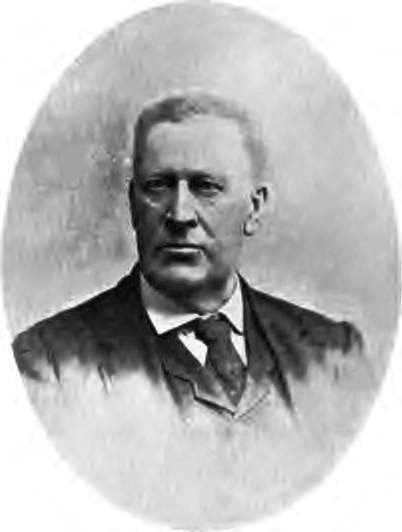
Thomas R. Cornelius

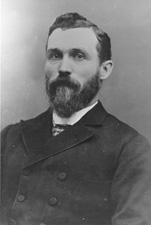
William J. McConnell

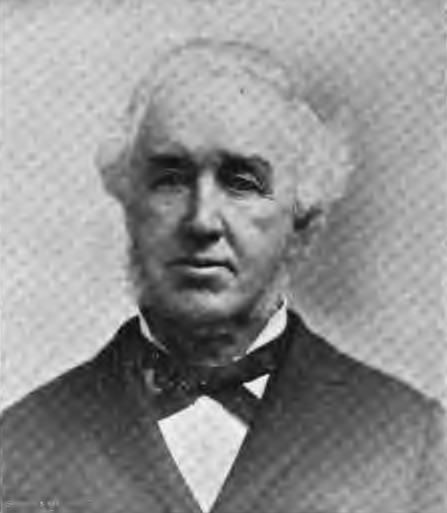
John C. Carson

Number	Session	Type	Name	County represented	Political party
1	1859	Special	Luther Elkins	Linn	Democratic
1	1860	Regular	Luther Elkins	Linn	Democratic
2	1862	Regular	Wilson Bowlby	Washington	Republican
3	1864	Regular	John H. Mitchell	Multnomah	Republican
3	1865	Special	John H. Mitchell	Multnomah	Republican
4	1866	Regular	Thomas R. Cornelius	Washington	Republican
5	1868	Regular	Benjamin Franklin Burch	Polk	Democratic
6	1870	Regular	James D. Fay	Jackson	Democratic
6	1872	Regular	James D. Fay	Jackson	Democratic
7	1874	Regular	Robert B. Cochran	Lane	Democratic
8	1876	Regular	John Whiteaker	Lane	Democratic
8	1878	Regular	John Whiteaker	Lane	Democratic
9	1880	Regular	Solomon Hirsch	Multnomah	Republican
10	1882	Regular	William J. McConnell	Yamhill	Republican
11	1885	Regular; Special	William Waldo	Marion	Republican
12	1887	Regular	John C. Carson	Multnomah	Republican
13	1889	Regular	Joseph Simon	Multnomah	Republican
13	1891	Regular	Joseph Simon	Multnomah	Republican
14.	1893	Regular	Charles W. Fulton	Clatsop	Republican
13	1895	Regular	Joseph Simon	Multnomah	Republican
13	1897	Regular	Joseph Simon	Multnomah	Republican
13	1898	Special	Joseph Simon	Multnomah	Republican
15	1899	Regular	T. C. Taylor	Umatilla	Republican
14	1901	Regular	Charles W. Fulton	Clatsop	Republican
16	1903	Regular; Special	George C. Brownell	Clackamas	Republican
17	1905	Regular	William Kuykendall	Lane	Republican
18	1907	Regular	Edward W. Haines	Washington	Republican
19	1909	Regular; Special	Jay Bowerman	Gilliam	Republican
20	1911	Regular	Ben Selling	Multnomah	Republican
21	1913	Regular	Daniel J. Malarkey	Multnomah	Republican
22	1915	Regular	W. Lair Thompson	Lake	Republican
23	1917	Regular	Gus C. Moser	Multnomah	Republican
24	1919	Regular	William T. Vinton	Yamhill	Republican
24	1920	Special	William T. Vinton	Yamhill	Republican
25	1921	Regular; Special	Roy W. Ritner	Umatilla	Republican
26	1923	Regular	Jay H. Upton	Crook	Republican
23	1925	Regular	Gus C. Moser	Multnomah	Republican
27	1927	Regular	Henry L. Corbett	Multnomah	Republican
28	1929	Regular	A. W. Norblad	Clatsop	Republican
29	1931	Regular	Willard L. Marks	Linn	Republican
30	1933	Regular; Special	Fred E. Kiddle	Union	Republican
27	1935	Regular	Henry L. Corbett	Multnomah	Republican
31	1937	Regular	F. M. Franciscovich	Clatsop	Republican
32	1939	Regular	Robert M. Duncan	Harney	Republican
33	1941	Regular	Dean H. Walker	Polk	Republican
34	1943	Regular	William H. Steiwer	Wheeler	Republican
35	1945	Regular	Howard C. Belton	Clackamas	Republican
36	1947	Regular	Marshall E. Cornett	Klamath	Republican
37	1949	Regular	William E. Walsh	Coos	Republican
38	1951	Regular	Paul L. Patterson	Washington	Republican
39	1953	Regular	Eugene E. Marsh	Yamhill	Republican
40	1955	Regular	Elmo Smith	Grant	Republican
41	1957	Regular; Special	Boyd R. Overhulse	Jefferson	Democratic
42	1959	Regular	Walter J. Pearson	Multnomah	Democratic
43	1961	Regular	Harry D. Boivin	Klamath	Democratic
44	1963	Regular; Special	Ben Musa	Wasco	Democratic
43	1965	Regular; Special	Harry D. Boivin	Klamath	Democratic
45	1967	Regular; Special	Eugene "Debbs" Potts	Josephine	Democratic
45	1969	Regular	Eugene "Debbs" Potts	Josephine	Democratic
46	1971	Regular; Special	John D. Burns	Multnomah	Democratic
47	1973	Regular	Jason Boe	Douglas	Democratic
47	1974	Special	Jason Boe	Douglas	Democratic
47	1975	Regular	Jason Boe	Douglas	Democratic
47	1977	Regular	Jason Boe	Douglas	Democratic
47	1978	Special	Jason Boe	Douglas	Democratic
47	1979	Regular	Jason Boe	Douglas	Democratic
47	1980	Special	Jason Boe	Douglas	Democratic
48	1981	Regular; Special	Fred W. Heard	Klamath	Democratic
49	1983	Regular; Special	Edward N. Fadeley	Lane	Democratic
50	1985	Regular	John Kitzhaber	Douglas	Democratic
50	1987	Regular	John Kitzhaber	Douglas	Democratic
50	1989	Regular; Special	John Kitzhaber	Douglas	Democratic
50	1991	Regular	John Kitzhaber	Douglas	Democratic
51	1993	Regular	Bill Bradbury	Coos	Democratic
52	1995	Regular; Special	Gordon Smith	Umatilla	Republican
53	1997	Regular	Brady L. Adams	Josephine	Republican
53	1999	Regular; Special	Brady L. Adams	Josephine	Republican
54	2001	Regular; Special	Gene Derfler	Marion	Republican
55	2003	Regular	Peter Courtney	Marion	Democratic
55	2005	Regular	Peter Courtney	Marion	Democratic
55	2006	Special	Peter Courtney	Marion	Democratic
55	2007	Regular	Peter Courtney	Marion	Democratic
55	2008	Special	Peter Courtney	Marion	Democratic
55	2009	Regular	Peter Courtney	Marion	Democratic
55	2010	Special	Peter Courtney	Marion	Democratic
55	2011	Regular	Peter Courtney	Marion	Democratic
55	2012	Regular; Special	Peter Courtney	Marion	Democratic
55	2013	Regular; Special	Peter Courtney	Marion	Democratic
55	2014	Regular	Peter Courtney	Marion	Democratic
55	2015	Regular	Peter Courtney	Marion	Democratic
55	2016	Regular	Peter Courtney	Marion	Democratic
55	2017	Regular	Peter Courtney	Marion	Democratic
55	2018	Regular; Special	Peter Courtney	Marion	Democratic
55	2019	Regular	Peter Courtney	Marion	Democratic
55	2020	Regular; Special	Peter Courtney	Marion	Democratic
55	2021	Regular; Special	Peter Courtney	Marion	Democratic
55	2022	Regular	Peter Courtney	Marion	Democratic
56	2023	Regular	Rob Wagner	Clackamas	Democratic
56	2024	Regular; Special	Rob Wagner	Clackamas	Democratic
56	2025	Regular	Rob Wagner	Clackamas	Democratic

== See also ==
- List of speakers of the Oregon House of Representatives
- List of Oregon Legislative Assemblies
- Lists of Oregon-related topics
