= Roy W. Ritner =

Oregon state legislator and farmer (1867–1942)

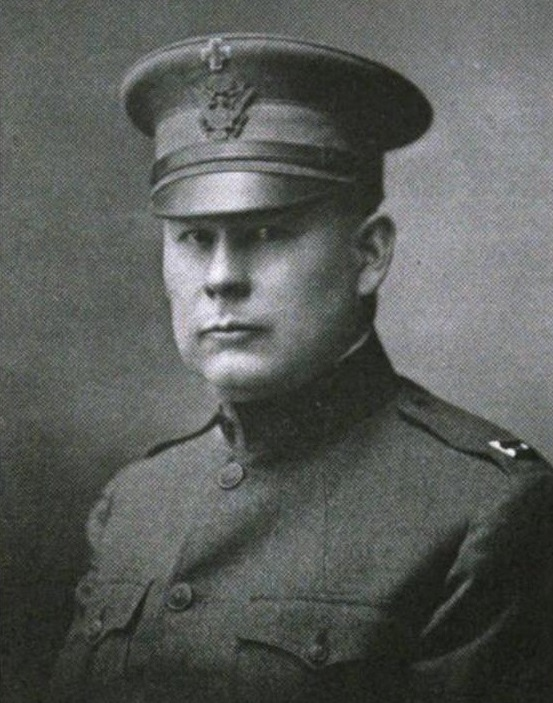
- Ritner in Red Cross uniform, 1918

25th President of the Oregon State Senate
- In office 1921–1922
- Preceded by: William T. Vinton
- Succeeded by: Jay Upton

Member of the Oregon Senate from the 20th district
- In office 1919–1926
- Preceded by: Frederick Steiwer
- Succeeded by: Lawrence L. Mann
- Constituency: Umatilla County

Member of the Oregon Senate from the 23rd district
- In office 1915–1918
- Preceded by: Lawrence L. Mann
- Succeeded by: Cyril G. Brownell
- Constituency: Umatilla County

Personal details
- Born: Roy Wallace Ritner; February 13, 1876 Placerville, California, U.S.
- Died: December 3, 1942 (aged 66) Pendleton, Oregon, U.S.
- Party: Republican
- Profession: Farmer

Roy Wallace Ritner (February 13, 1876 – December 3, 1942) was an American politician and farmer from Pendleton, Oregon. Beginning in 1915, he served two two-year terms in the Oregon House of Representatives followed by two four-year terms in the Oregon State Senate. Ritner was a conservative Republican who represented Umatilla County in both of Oregon's legislative chambers. He was President of the Oregon State Senate from 1921 through 1922. While he was senate president in 1922, he served as acting governor for 35 days while the elected governor was out of the state. Ritner was also a successful wheat farmer and served as the business manager for the Pendleton Round-Up for many years.

== Early life ==
Ritner was born on February 13, 1876, in Placerville, California. He was the son of Joseph P. Ritner and Sarah (Harbison) Ritner. His father came to the west coast by way of the Isthmus of Panama in 1850. In California, he organized pack trains to and from gold mining areas for the Wells Fargo Company before moving to Oregon. In Oregon, he was employed building bridges for the Oregon Railroad and Navigation Company. He eventually settled with his family in northeastern Oregon.

Ritner was raised in Umatilla County and attended school in Pendleton. He went on to attend Weston Normal School in Weston, Oregon. After graduation, he began teaching in rural Umatilla County. He then worked briefly as a reporter for the Pendleton Tribune before taking a job as a bookkeeper at the Pendleton Saving Bank (later renamed American National Bank of Pendleton). Ritner worked at the bank for ten years. Ritner also served as a Sergeant in Company C of the Oregon National Guard's Third Battalion during the mid-1890s. He deployed with his unit in 1898 to support in the Spanish-American War.

Ritner used the money he made to buy farmland. Eventually, he owned 1,920 acres (7.8 km^{2}) which he began farming in 1908. He also acquired an interest in a local flour mill and a boarding house in Pendleton. When the Pendleton Round-Up was started in 1910, Ritner became the unpaid business manager for the annual event. He continued in that position until he joined the American Red Cross in France during World War I.

Ritner was very active in community affairs. He was president of the Pendleton Commercial Association and secretary of the local Red Cross organization. He was a member of the local Elks lodge and Knights of Pythias, serving as president of the local chapter. He was a Mason in the Shriners and Commandery orders. He was also president of the local automobile club and a well-known baseball player, serving as president of the Western Tri-State Baseball League for several years.

Ritner first became interested in state politics in 1909 when he worked as the Oregon State Senate's calendar clerk, a position elected by members of the senate. He returned to that position for the 1911 legislative session. He applied for the clerk position again in 1913, but lost his bid after four tied ballots in the senate. While he lost the vote for clerk, the experience of working at the legislature aroused a lifelong interest in state government.

== State representative ==
In 1914, Ritner announced he would run for a seat in the Oregon House of Representatives, representing Umatilla County. He was one of two Republicans who filed for the District 23 House seats. The other candidate was Joseph T. Hinkle from Hermiston. Because there were two District 23 seats in the House, Republicans could nominate two candidates for the general election. Therefore, Ritner and Hinkle both advanced to the general election while Umatilla County Democrats nominated H. J. Taylor and A. W. Simmons for the two district 23 seats.

Ritner and Hinkle won the two District 23 House seats in the 1914 general election. Ritner received 3,924 votes while Hinkle got 3,496 votes, beating Taylor by only 7 votes. Simmons finishing last with 2,893 votes.

Ritner took his seat in the Oregon House of Representatives on January 11, 1915, representing District 23. When the session was organized, Ritner was appointed chairman of the public institutions committee. He also served on the game, livestock, resolutions, and roads and highways committees. He served through the 28th regular session of the legislature which adjourned on February 20. During the session, Ritner introduces a bill that required Oregon's railroad commission to have at least one commissioner from Eastern Oregon. A compromise bill to elect railroad commissioners by district passed the legislature. As a result, there would be one commissioner from an Eastern Oregon district, one from a Western Oregon district, and one at-large commissioner. Ritner also helped reform Oregon game laws and promoted a county library bill that boosted library construction around the state.

In 1916, Ritner announced his decision to run for re-election to the Oregon House. He officially filed for the District 23 seat a few weeks later. Once again, there were only two Republicans in the primary running for the county's two District 23 House seats. Ritner won Republican primary with 2,701 votes with J. A. Best trailing with 2,180 votes. However, because there were two available seats, both Ritner and Best advanced to the general election. The Democratic primary nominated Louis Hodgen and W. T. Reeves for the two District 23 seats.

In the general election, Ritner won re-election to the House with 3,549 votes. One of the Democratic candidates, Louis Hodgen, won the second District 23 seat with 3,388 votes. Reeves was third with 3,255 votes and Best was last receiving only 2,723 votes.

Ritner was a strong supporter of Robert N. Stanfield for House speaker. After the general election, he helped secure support from other House members before the legislative session began. Two weeks after the general election, Ritner announced that Stanfield had 40 votes for speaker. Since the House had 60 members, all he needed was 31 to assure his election as speaker.

Ritner took his seat in Oregon's House of Representatives when the legislative session began on January 8. During the session, Stanfield appointed Ritner chairman of the banking committee. He was also a member of the game, resolutions, and roads and highways committees. The session completed its business and adjourned on February 19.

== State senator ==
In early 1918, Ritner announced he would run for the Oregon State Senate's District 20 seat, representing Umatilla County. He officially filed for the District 20 seat, once again as a Republican.

By 1918, the United States had entered World War I. Ritner had been active in the local Red Cross chapter for a number of years. Shortly after filing for the state senate seat, Ritner volunteered for an unpaid Red Cross position serving on the front line in France. Once he was accepted for the position, he was given only two weeks to settle his affairs at home. He was also required to pay his own expenses while he was deployed. Before leaving for France, he announced that he would remain a candidate for the state senate.

When Ritner arrived in France, he was given the Red Cross rank of captain, equivalent of an Army captain. He was assigned to the Fifth Infantry Division (known as the Red Diamond Division). He was then integrated into the headquarters staff as the division's Red Cross field representative. During his time in France, Ritner cared for wounded at the Battle of Saint-Mihiel and the Argonne Forest. Eventually, he was given responsibility for the division's supply system. He served in France for nine months, returning home on Christmas Day 1918.

Back in Oregon, no other Republicans filed for the District 20 senate seat, nor did any Democrats. As a result, he won both the Republican primary and the general election unopposed while he was serving in France.

Ritner returned from France just in time to join the 1919 legislative session, which began on January 13. As the state senate was organizing, it initially looked like William T. Vinton might fall short of the required 16 votes needed to be elected senate president. At that point, the media speculated that Ritner might be a good alternative to Vinton. However, Vinton ultimately secured the require majority and was elected senate president. During the session, Ritner was appointed chairman of the senate assessment and taxation committee. He was also a member of the federal relations, game, military affairs, public lands, and resolutions committees. The regular session was adjourned on February 27.

In early 1920, the legislature was called back for a special session. The special session began on January 12 and lasted less than a week. During that short session, the Oregon legislature passed the federal women suffrage amendment.

Since Oregon's state senators served four-year terms, Ritner did not have to run for re-election prior to the 1921 legislative session. Six months before the 1921 legislative session began, Ritner was an announced candidate for senate president. Prior to the session, Ritner met with fellow senators, actively seeking their support. The state media reported that there were four senators seeking the post of senate president. They were divided into two groups, each group had two candidates vying for support within their group and trying to gain support from the few uncommitted senators. Ritner and William W. Banks of Multnomah County led one group with around 15 supporters. The leaders of the second group were Benjamin L. Eddy of Douglas County and Louis Lachmund of Marion County. According to media reports, Ritner had the most supporters, but not enough to be elected without support from Banks. On the other side, Eddy and Lachmund each had six votes lined up. Sixteen votes were needed to be elected president. When Banks dropped out of the race and endorses Ritner, he likely had enough vote to be elected senate president. However, half of the incumbent senators were running for re-election and some were unwilling to officially announce their support until after the general election. After the election, Ritner gathered commitments from 19 fellow senators, assuring him of being elected senate president.

When the 1921 legislative session opened on January 10, Ritner was nominated for senate president by Senator Eddy. He was then unanimously elected to that post. Ritner presided over the senate chamber throughout the regular session which end on February 23. At the close of the legislative session, fellow senators praised Ritner for his fairness and impartiality. In recognition of his service, his senate peers presented him with a diamond ring bearing the image of the Oregon state capitol. Later that year, Ritner presided over the senate during a special legislative session that began on December 19. The special session finished its business and adjourned on December 24.

In late November 1922, as his two-year term as senate president was coming to an end, Ritner became acting governor for 35 days. At that time, the senate president became acting governor whenever the elected governor left the state for any reason. As Governor Ben W. Olcott's term was ending, he decided to take an out-of-state vacation after attending the national governors' conference. This left Ritner in charge of the state government. He used his time as governor to finish the state budget proposal that would go to the legislature in January. He earned praise for that work. However, he also extended executive clemency to 74 state penitentiary inmates including 27 pardons, 28 early paroles, 7 paroles with full restoration of citizenship rights, and 12 sentence commutations. This included releasing 10 murderers who were serving life sentences. While in every case he required a positive recommendation from the sentencing judge along with a statement from the prison warden certifying that the inmate had been a model prisoner, these actions were very controversial.

As he ended his two-year stint as president of the state senate, Ritner announced he would run for re-election in Umatilla County. Media reports indicated that it was unlikely that Ritner would have any opposition for the District 20 seat. That proved true. Ritner files for re-election with no opposition from either party filing against him, so he was easily re-elected.

Ritner took his District 20 seat when the legislative session began on January 8. During the session Ritner served as chairman of the resolutions committee. He was also a member of the assessment and taxation, military affairs, and roads and highways committees. The session lasted six weeks, adjourning on February 26.

Due to his four-year term, Ritner did not have to run for re-election prior to the 1925 legislative session. The session began on January 12. Ritner served as temporary chairman of the senate while the chamber was organized, and officers were elected. The senate elected Gus C. Moser as senate president with Riter's support. Moser appointed Ritner to the powerful three-member rules committee. He was also appointed chairman of elections and privileges committee and served as a member of assessment and taxation, military affairs, and resolutions committees. The session was adjourned on February 26.

== Later politics ==
Ritner decided not to run for re-election to the state senate in 1926. Instead, he announced that he would run for the House District 22 seat, a joint district representing both Umatilla and Morrow counties. He was well known in both counties and was endorsed by the Morrow County newspaper. He was opposed in the Republican primary by J. P. Gilliland. Ritner won the Republican nomination for the House District 22 seat by 110 votes over Gilliland.

In the general election, Ritner was opposed by the Democratic nominee, Joseph N. Scott. Ritner lost the general election to Scott, who received 3,872 votes against his 3,768 votes. The prison pardons Ritner had handed out while serving as acting governor in 1922 came up during the campaign. The media blamed Ritner loss on the pardons controversy.

After losing the election, Ritner returned to his Umatilla County farm and continued his civic work in the Pendleton area. However, he remained interested and active in state politics. In 1928, Ritner decided to run against the incumbent Democrat, Joseph Scott, for the District 22 House seat. However, Ritner withdrew from the state House race at the last minute when Congressman Nicholas J. Sinnott resigned on short notice to take a federal judge position.

Sinnott's resignation left Oregon's 2nd congressional district vacant with no Republican candidates on the primary ballot. As a result, Republicans who were interested in the second congressional district seat needed to seek write-in votes and that is what Ritner did. He asked his supporters to write-in his name for the open congressional seat in the Republican primary. Ritner's write-in campaign placed him second in the race for the Republican nomination for the second congressional district seat. Robert R. Butler won the nomination with 4,244 write-in votes, followed by Ritner with 2,158 votes. The others eight write-in candidates trailed far behind Butler and Ritner.

== Later life ==
Ritner remained engaged in state politics and agricultural affairs. He was a spokesman for several agriculture groups. In early 1929, Ritner was elected president of the Eastern Oregon Wheat League. Later that year, he was elected to the North Pacific Grain Growers board of directors. He also remained interested in Republican politics. For example, he attended a large eastern Oregon Republican conference in 1930.

In 1936, Ritner announced another run for Oregon's 2nd congressional district. Ritner and four other Republicans competed for the nomination. The other four were C. D. Nickelson of Hood River, Clarence Phillips of Burns, R. A. Tull of La Grande, and Phil Yates of Pendleton. Walter M. Pierce and Clint Haight competed for the Democratic nomination. Ritner won the Republican primary with 7,329 votes. Nickleson was second with 6,569 votes, followed by Phillips with 3,817, Tull with 2,653, and Yates with 2,395 votes. In the Democratic primary, Pierce won with 10,111 votes over Haight who got 7,235 votes. In the general election, Pieces won re-election by a wide margin over Ritner, receiving 46,752 votes against Ritner's 21,763 votes.

In 1940, Ritner once again filed for the Republican nomination for Oregon's 2nd congressional district seat. He faced Rex Ellis of Pendleton in the Republican primary, while incumbent Walter Pierce was unopposed in the Democratic primary. Ellis defeated Ritner in the Republican primary. Ellis received 11,247 votes while Ritner fell short with 10,391.

In his later years, Ritner was secretary of the Pendleton Chamber of Commerce, serving in that position from 1932 to 1941. He served as secretary of the Oregon Farm Bureau beginning in 1941 and was vice president of the Rodeo Association of America. In addition, he continued as the Pendleton Round-Up's business manager until his death.

Ritner died in a Pendleton hospital on December 3, 1942, after a paralytic stroke. He was 75 years old at the time of his death. His funeral service was held in Pendleton on December 5, 1942. Members of the Pendleton Round-Up Association were pallbearers at the funeral.
