= William T. Vinton =

Oregon attorney and state legislator (1865–1945)

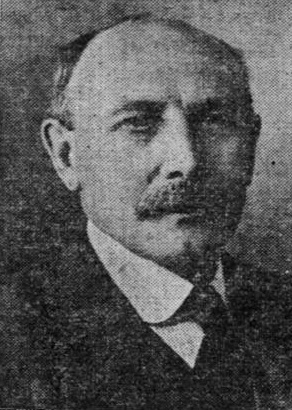
- Oregon senate president W. T. Vinton, 1913

24th President of the Oregon State Senate
- In office 1919–1920
- Preceded by: Gus C. Moser
- Succeeded by: Roy W. Ritner

Member of the Oregon Senate from the 10th district
- In office 1915–1921
- Preceded by: J. L. Hoskins
- Succeeded by: Peter C. Zimmerman
- Constituency: Yamhill County

Personal details
- Born: William Thomas Vinton; June 16, 1865 Fond du Lac, Wisconsin, U.S.
- Died: August 8, 1945 (aged 80) McMinnville, Oregon, U.S.
- Party: Republican
- Spouse: Minnie May Wood (m. 1892)
- Children: 1
- Profession: Attorney

William Thomas Vinton (June 16, 1865 – August 8, 1945), known as W. T. Vinton or Billy Vinton, was an American attorney and politician from McMinnville, Oregon. He represented Yamhill County in the Oregon State Senate from 1915 through 1922, as a conservative Republican. He was president of the state senate from 1919 through 1920. In that capacity, he served as acting governor for two short periods in 1919 while the elected governor was out of the state. Vinton was a successful attorney who practiced law from 1892 until his death in 1945.

== Early life ==
Vinton was born on June 16, 1865, in Fond du Lac, Wisconsin. He was the son of John C. Vinton and his wife Harriet. Vinton's father was born in Wales and immigrated to the United States in 1838. He settled in Pennsylvania and then Wisconsin, where he bought a large farm. His wife was born in New York. Together they had eight children. William was their sixth child. The family later moved to Iowa, where young Vinton attended public schools in Central City before entering the Iowa State Normal School at Cedar Falls. He then attended Lenox College in Hopkinton, Iowa. He graduated from college with a Bachelor of Arts degree in 1888.

After graduating from college, Vinton moved to Oregon. He taught school in Moro and Grass Valley until 1891, when he moved to McMinnville. There, he studied law under the guidance of James McCain, a successful local attorney. Vinton married Minnie May Wood on January 3, 1892. Together they had one son, Gale Boyd Vinton, whose own son Will Vinton would become an award-winning claymation animator. He was admitted to the Oregon State Bar in 1892 and joined McCain's law firm as a partner. He remained in that partnership until McCain died in 1919. Vinton then took Walter L. Tooze as his law partner. Their firm was very successful. It was widely known for its excellent law library.

Vinton was a member of the local bar association, the state bar association, and the American Bar Association. He was a member of the local Elks lodge and Knights of Pythias as well as a Free Mason. Over the years, Vinton acquired five large farms in Yamhill, Polk, and Jefferson counties, which he leased to local farmers. His farms produced grass, seed wheat, and other grain crops. Vinton also kept a large flock of pure-bred Cotswold sheep on his farm property.

Vinton was also active in public affairs. He served two terms as McMinnville's city recorder, then deputy district attorney for Yamhill County, and McMinnville's city attorney before being elected mayor in 1911 and serving one term. While mayor, Vinton refused to sign a paving contract he believed was illegal. A local court ruled that as mayor, he did not have the authority to refuse to sign a contract that was approved by the city council. When he still refused to sign, the judge sent him to jail for contempt of court. He only served three hours before being released. He appealed the local court decision. Ultimately, Vinton was vindicated by an Oregon Supreme Court decision in his favor.

== State senator ==
Vinton served two four-year terms in the Oregon State Senate. He was first elected in 1914 and took his seat in January 1915 and continued serving in the state senate until he was defeated in the 1922 Republican primary. Vinton was elected president of the Oregon State Senate by his fellow senators in 1919 and served in that position through 1920. While he was senate president, he served as acting governor twice in 1919 when the elected governor was out of the state.

=== First term ===
In 1914, Vinton announced he would run for a seat in the Oregon State Senate, representing Yamhill County. He was one of three Republicans who filed for the District 10 senate seat. The other two candidates were Roy Graves of Sheridan and Sam Laughlin of Yamhill. Vinton easily won the Republican primary for the District 10 senate seat with 1,059 votes, while Graves received 678 votes and Laughlin got only 563. Since no Democrats filed for the District 10 senate seat, Vinton was unopposed in the general election.

Vinton took his seat in the Oregon State Senate on January 11, 1915, representing District 10. When the session was organized, Vinton was appointed chairman of the military affairs committee. He also served on the commerce and navigation, education, judiciary, and medicine, pharmacy, and dentistry committees. He served through the 28th regular session of the legislature, which adjourned on February 20.

Since Oregon's state senators served four-year terms, Vinton did not have to run for re-election prior to the 1917 legislative session. According to media reports, he was a leading candidate for senate president. Prior to the session, Vinton met with Gus C. Moser, who was actively seeking the senate president position. Vinton agreed to support Moser.

Vinton took his District 10 seat when the legislative session began on January 8. When the session opened, Vinton seconded Moser's nomination for senate president, and Moser was elected unanimously to that position. Moser appointed Vinton to the powerful three-person rules committee. He was also appointed chairman of the judiciary committee. In addition, he served on the county and state officers, insurance, medicine, pharmacy, and dentistry, and public lands committees. The 1915 legislative session lasted through February 19.

=== Second term ===
In 1918, Vinton announced he would be a candidate for re-election to the state senate in District 10. Shortly after the announcement, he officially filed for re-election. No one else filed for the District 10 seat, so he was unopposed in both the Republican primary and in the general election. As a result, he was re-elected to the state senate. Vinton also announced he would be a candidate for the senate president position.

Conrad P. Olson of Multnomah County also announced his interest in the senate president position. However, before the legislative session began, Olson was appointed to Oregon Supreme Court. A short time after Olson left the race, Senator Robert S. Farrell of Multnomah County decided to become a candidate for senate president. Vinton was supported by former state senate president Gus C. Moser. Eventually, Vinton lined up 16 Republicans and 2 Democratic senators pledged to support him for senate president. In a 30-member senate chamber, just 16 votes are required to elect the president.

The state's 30th regular legislative session began on January 13, 1919. When the senate was organized, Vinton was elected senate president without opposition. During the session, Vinton proposed a state-wide construction program to provide jobs for returning World War I veterans. His plan included expanded road construction, new building for state agencies, improvement at state college campuses, and a new state penitentiary. He proposed funding the program with a special bond issue. The 1919 legislative session was adjourned on February 22. At the close of the legislative session, fellow senators recognized Vinton for his affability and firm but fair leadership, and presented him with a gold watch.

At that time, the senate president became acting governor whenever the elected governor left the state. In June 1919, Vinton was acting governor for two days while Governor Ben W. Olcott was in California. He served as acting governor again in August 1919 while Governor Olcott was out of the state attending the western governors' conference in Salt Lake City.

The Oregon legislature was called into special session in January 1920. The special session began on January 12 and lasted for a week. Vinton was the presiding officer in the senate. During the session, the legislature passed the federal women suffrage amendment.

Vinton did not have to run for re-election before the start of the 1921 legislative session. That session began on January 10 and lasted through February 23. Vinton did not seek the senate president position. Instead, he served as chairman of the county and state officers committee. He was also a member of the federal relations, industries, judiciary, and municipal affairs committees.

In 1922, three Republicans filed for District 10 senate seat. The three Republican candidates were Vinton, Peter C. Zimmerman of Yamhill, and W. W. Lunger of Lafayette. In addition to the Republicans, G. B. Foster of Dayton filed as a Democrat. In the Republican primary, Zimmerman defeated Vinton by 35 votes, with Lunger running far behind. Zimmerman went on the win the District 10 seat in the general election.

== Later life ==
After leaving the state senate, Vinton returned to his McMinnville law practice on a full-time basis. He remained in partnership with Walter Tooze until 1926, when Tooze relocated to Portland. Shortly after Tooze left, Vinton brought Eugene E. Marsh into the firm. In 1936, Marsh's twin brother Frances E. Marsh joined the partnership. At that time, the firm became known as Vinton, Marsh and Marsh. Vinton was president of the Polk-Yamhill Bar Association in 1939.

In 1943, the Oregon legislature passed a law allowing counties to publish budget summaries in lieu of printing the complete budget. Vinton challenged the law the following year, when Yamhill County published an abbreviated budget. Ultimately, his case was heard by the Oregon Supreme Court. The supreme court sided with Vinton and ruled that counties must publish the full text of county budgets.

Vinton also remained engaged in politics and civic affairs. In 1936, he was selected as a delegate to the Republican national convention in Cleveland, Ohio. In the community, Vinton was a member of the Chamber of Commerce. He was an active member of McMinnville's Elks Lodge and the local Knights of Pythias chapter, serving as president of both those organizations. He was also a lifelong Mason.

Vinton died on August 8, 1945, at his home in McMinnville, Oregon. He was 80 years old at the time of his death. His funeral service was held at the Methodist church in McMinnville on August 10.

== See also ==
- Will Vinton, his grandson, a famous Oregon animator.
