= Joe E. Dunne =

American politician

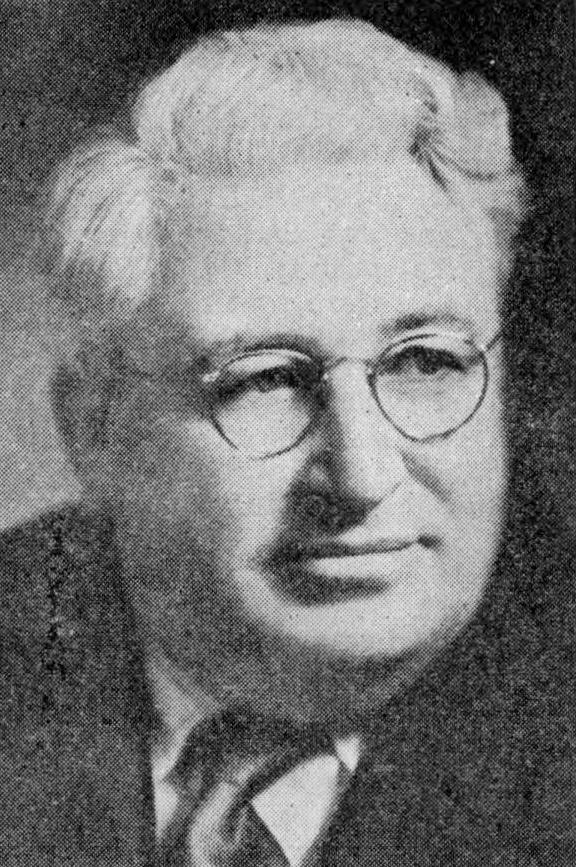

Member of the Oregon Senate from the 14th district
- In office January 10, 1927 – January 14, 1935
- Preceded by: W. J. H. Clark
- Succeeded by: Walter E. Pearson

Personal details
- Born: November 20, 1881 Portland, Oregon, United States
- Died: April 8, 1963 (aged 81) Portland
- Party: Republican

Joseph Edward Dunne (November 20, 1881 – April 8, 1963) was an American politician from Oregon.

== Biography ==
Dunne was born in 1881 in Portland, Oregon.

He was elected to the Oregon State Senate in 1926, serving until 1935.

Dunne ran for Governor of Oregon in 1934. He defeated Peter C. Zimmerman in the Republican primary, but lost to Charles Martin in the general election, in which Zimmerman ran as an independent with the backing of farm groups. Dunne received 29% of the vote, finishing in third place out of six candidates.

Dunne was later a delegate to the 1936 Republican National Convention.

Party political offices
Preceded by Phil Metschan Jr.	Republican nominee for Governor of Oregon; 1934	Succeeded by Charles A. Sprague
