= Willis Mahoney =

American politician

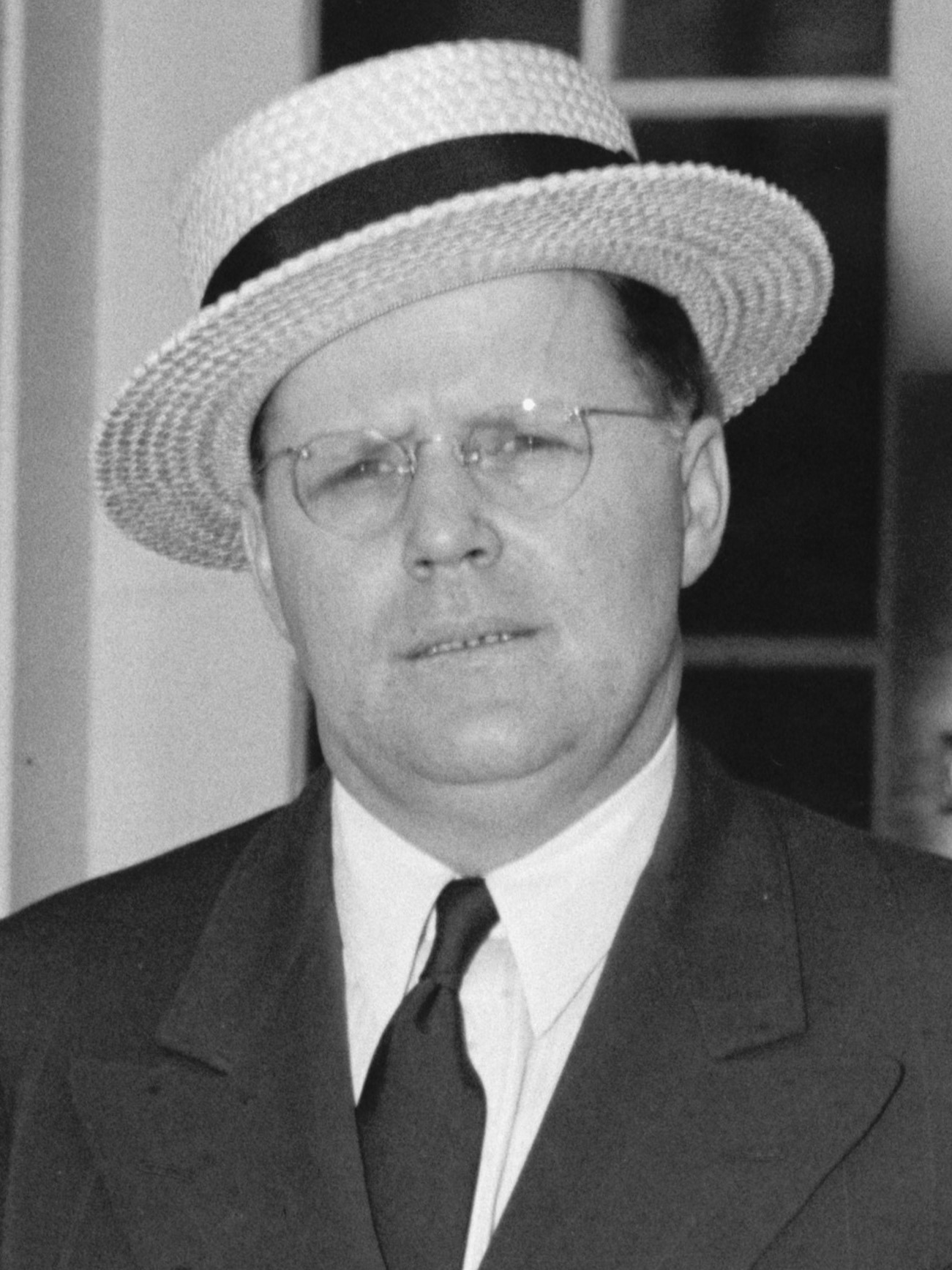
- Mahoney in 1938

Mayor of Klamath Falls, Oregon
- In office January 4, 1933 – January 4, 1937
- Succeeded by: Clifton Richmond

Member of the Washington House of Representatives from the 8th district
- In office January 8, 1923 – January 12, 1925
- Preceded by: Multi-member district
- Succeeded by: Multi-member district

Personal details
- Born: June 13, 1895 Moscow, Idaho, U.S.
- Died: June 2, 1968 (aged 72) Astoria, Oregon, U.S.
- Party: Democratic

Willis Edward Mahoney (June 13, 1895 – June 2, 1968) was an American politician from the states of Oregon and Washington. He was a member of the Washington State Legislature, was mayor of Klamath Falls, Oregon, and three times was a candidate to represent Oregon in the United States Senate, losing to Charles L. McNary in 1936, Rufus Holman in 1938, and Guy Cordon in 1944.

Mahoney supported the Townsend Plan, a proposal presented by Francis Townsend for a national sales tax to pay for a $200 monthly pension for everyone over age 60, as well as President Franklin D. Roosevelt and the New Deal.

== Biography ==
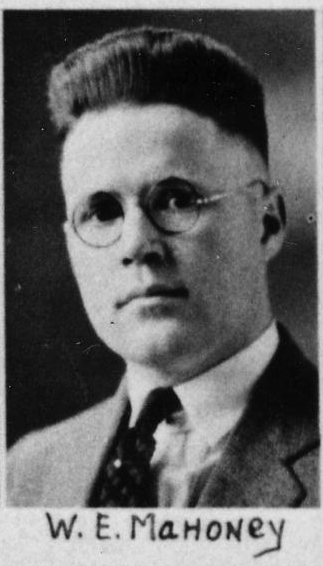
Mahoney's official State House portrait, 1923

Mahoney was born in Moscow, Idaho on June 13, 1895. He studied law and served one term in the Washington House of Representatives from 1923 to 1925. He had lived in Oregon for five years before announcing his campaign for U.S. Senate against McNary, but he proved to be an aggressive opponent to the senator, at times asking crowds: "Has anybody seen from our Senior Senator lately?" The election was close, but McNary was reelected.

One year after his defeat, Mahoney was charged with reckless driving in an incident that killed Thomas L. Zimmerman of Shedd. But he filed for another race for U.S. Senate in 1938, and won the Democratic primary.

The reckless driving case seemed to be over by 1938, but it was reopened during the campaign, but did not affect Mahoney's campaign from moving forward. Still, he lost the race 57-42% to Holman, and was defeated for yet another run for the Senate in 1944, by Guy Cordon. He died in 1968.

Party political offices
Preceded by Elton Watkins	Democratic nominee for U.S. Senator from Oregon (Class 2); 1936	Succeeded by Walter W. Whitbeck
Preceded by Walter B. Gleason	Democratic nominee for U.S. Senator from Oregon (Class 3); 1938	Succeeded by Edgar W. Smith
Preceded by Walter W. Whitbeck	Democratic nominee for U.S. Senator from Oregon (Class 2); 1944	Succeeded by Manley J. Wilson
