= Alex M. LaFollette =

American politician

Alex M. LaFollette (a.k.a. La Follet) (1845 – July 25, 1927) was a Republican member of the Oregon Legislative Assembly representing Salem, Oregon, and a farmer. He served in the house of representatives (1887 and 1903) and in the state senate from 1915 to 1925. In the 1919 and 1921 sessions in the senate, he served as an independent.

LaFollette was born in Indiana in 1845, moved to California in 1853, and to Oregon in 1859. He became wealthy through his farming, specifically through commercial fruit production. He was known as a steadfast opponent of taxation. On August 27, 1925, he announced he would not be seeking re-election and effectively retire. He died in his home after an illness of several weeks. By the time of his death, he was the longest-serving and most senior member of the Oregon Legislature.

== Personal life ==
LaFollete was notified on March 24, 1919, that his son, Perry, and his family were poisoned.
