= Peter C. Zimmerman =

American politician (1887–1950)

Peter Zimmerman
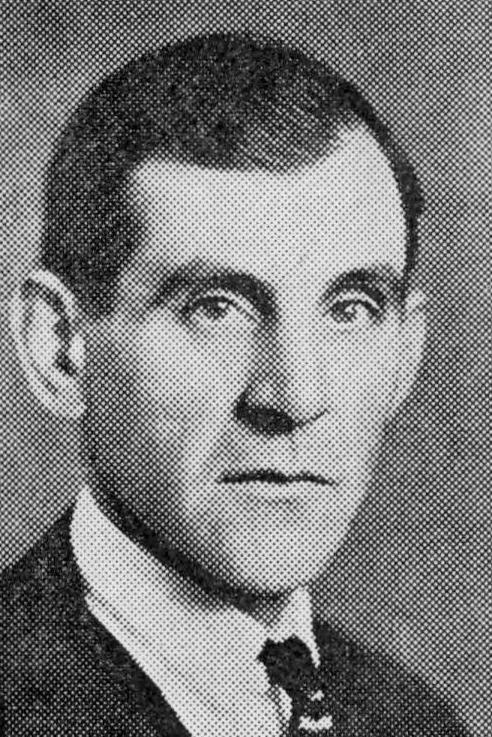

Member of the Oregon Senate from the 24th district
- In office January 9, 1933 – January 11, 1937
- Preceded by: Earl E. Fisher

Member of the Oregon Senate from the 10th district
- In office January 8, 1923 – January 10, 1927
- Preceded by: William T. Vinton
- Succeeded by: Clarence Butt

Personal details
- Born: August 17, 1887 Yamhill County, Oregon, United States
- Died: October 28, 1950 (aged 63)
- Party: Republican
- Other political affiliations: Independent (1934)
- Spouse: Ethel F. Patey
- Children: 1
- Education: Oregon State University

Peter Christian Zimmerman (August 17, 1887 – October 28, 1950) was an American politician from the state of Oregon.

== Biography ==
Zimmerman was born in 1887 to Christian Zimmerman and Louisa Sophia Nolteon and raised on a farm near Yamhill, Oregon. At the age of 15, he left home and apprenticed as a blacksmith. He continued his secondary education while working as a blacksmith and later graduated in engineering from Oregon State University. At the age of 22, Zimmerman purchased a small farm near Yamhill in 1919.

Zimmerman ran for the Oregon State Senate in 1922, defeating incumbent William T. Vinton in the Republican primary. He served until 1927, and was elected again in 1932, serving until 1937.

In 1934, Zimmerman ran for Governor of Oregon. Although he was defeated in the Republican primary by fellow state senator Joe E. Dunne, he was urged to run as an independent by farm groups. Zimmerman lost the general election to Democrat Charles Martin, receiving 32% of the vote and coming in second place, winning eight counties.

Zimmerman and his wife, Ethel F. Patey, had one daughter, Carolyn; she married Ben Larson. He died of throat cancer in 1950, aged 63.
