= Henry L. Corbett =

American politician

Henry Ladd Corbett
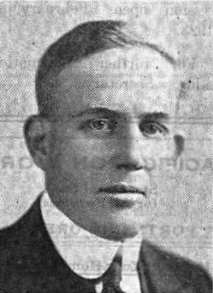
- Corbett circa 1922

President of the Oregon State Senate
- In office 1st: 1927–1928; 2nd: 1935–1936
- Preceded by: 1st: Gus C. Moser; 2nd: Fred E. Kiddle
- Succeeded by: 1st: A. W. Norblad; 2nd: F. M. Franciscovich

Oregon State Senator
- In office 1923–1931, 1933–1936
- Constituency: Multnomah County

Personal details
- Born: July 29, 1881 Portland, Oregon, US
- Died: April 22, 1957 (aged 75) Dunsmuir, California, US
- Party: Republican
- Spouse: Gretchen Hoyt Corbett
- Profession: Businessman

Henry Ladd Corbett (July 29, 1881 – April 22, 1957) was an American businessman, civic leader, and politician in the state of Oregon. He was born into one of the wealthiest and most influential families in Oregon. Corbett attended Harvard University and then returned to Oregon to manage family business interests. Over the years, he served as president of the Portland Chamber of Commerce and president of Portland Port Commission. He also represented Multnomah County in the Oregon State Senate, serving two terms as President of the Senate. He served as acting governor of Oregon twice in 1927.

== Early life ==
Corbett was born in Portland, Oregon on July 29, 1881, the son of Henry J. Corbett and Helen Ladd Corbett. The Corbett family was one of the wealthiest and most influential families in Oregon at that time. One of Corbett's grandfathers was Henry W. Corbett, a successful businessman and United States senator from Oregon. His other grandfather, William S. Ladd, was the mayor of Portland and founder the Ladd and Tilton Bank, the first bank established in the state of Oregon.

Henry grew up in Portland, where he attended the Portland Academy. His father died in 1895, when Corbett was 13 years old. As a young man, Corbett attended Harvard University. In addition to his academic studies, he was a football player at Harvard. He graduated with a Bachelor of Arts degree in 1903.

Because his father was dead when his grandfather, Henry W. Corbett, died in 1903, Corbett and his two younger brothers (Elliott R. Corbett and Hamilton F. Corbett) inherited the bulk of the Corbett family fortune. His grandfather's estate was valued at approximately $5,000,000, making all three young men very wealthy.

== Businessman ==
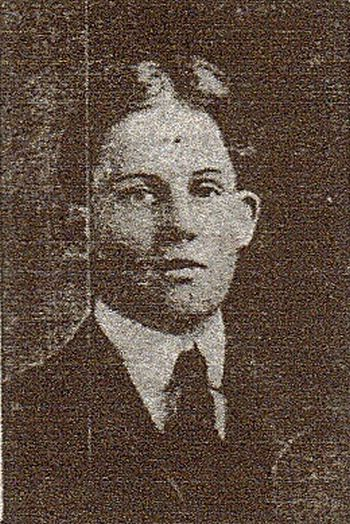
Corbett in 1903

After graduating from Harvard, Corbett returned to Oregon to manage family business interests which included a major ownership stake in Ladd and Tilton Bank inherited from the Ladd side of his family as well as the extensive holdings of the Corbett estate. In addition, Corbett got involved in Portland area civic affairs. He was appointed to the Lewis and Clark Exposition board of directors in 1903. He joined the Portland chamber of commerce and the Multnomah Athletic Club, where he played community league football. He also took up the sport of polo. In 1904, Corbett bought 19 acres (7.7 ha) in southwest Portland where he later built his family home. That home, known as the H. L. and Gretchen Hoyt Corbett House, is now listed on the National Register of Historic Places.

In 1907, Corbett joined C.E.S. Wood to establish the Blitzen Valley Land Company. The company bought the P Ranch, a 64,717-acre (26,190 ha) cattle ranch in Harney County, Oregon. The ranch was originally owned by the pioneer cattle baron, Peter French. After buying the property, Corbett moved to the ranch as the on-site manager. As a hands-on manager, he worked with his buckaroos out on the range whenever it was required. Eventually, the company was renamed the Eastern Oregon Live Stock Company. To service ranch visitors, the company built the Fenchglen Hotel in Frenchglen, Oregon, approximately 1 mile (1.6 km) from the ranch headquarters.

Corbett's businesses included the Portland Hotel.

After living on the ranch for about a year, Corbett returned to Portland. In May 1908, the Ladd and Tilton Bank was incorporated and Corbett was elected to the board of directors. Corbett and his brothers were also the corporation's largest stock holders. In addition his position on the Ladd and Tilton board, Corbett was a member of the board of directors for the First National Bank of Portland (later renamed First National Bank of Oregon). He was also president of the Portland Hotel Company that operated the Portland Hotel and vice president of the Oregon Electric Railway company as well as a member of that company's board of directors.

At the age of 26, Corbett married Gretchen Hoyt of New York City on 3 June 1908. Because of his prominence as a Portland businessman and community leader, the Morning Oregonian covered both Corbett's engagement announcement and his wedding on the front page of the newspaper.

In 1909, Portland's mayor, Joseph Simon, appointed Corbett to the Portland Executive Committee. The committee served as the mayor's cabinet, advising him on city government activities and related public affairs. Later that year, Corbett was elected to the board of directors for the Portland-based Home Telephone Company, one of the largest telephone systems in the United States at that time. By 1911, Corbett was also vice president of the Oregon Surety and Casualty Company and a member of that company's board of directors.

In 1915 and 1916, Corbett built a family home on his southwest Portland property, in an area now known as Dunthorpe. The home was designed by Whitehouse and Fouilhoux, a well known Portland architecture firm. It was a large two-story home with 7,000 square feet (650 m^{2}) of interior space. In addition to the family living areas, there was a two-story servants' wing connected to the main house.

Corbett served as president of Portland's chamber of commerce from 1917 through 1919. During World War I, he was president of the Oregon Council of National Defense and chairman of the United States War Trade Board in Portland. He was also chairman of Oregon's state Red Cross committee and headed two Red Cross fundraising drives. As president of the chamber of commerce, he worked with the War Industries Board to expand war production. He helped organize the Spruce Production Division for the war effort and facilitated increased output at Portland shipyards. He then began army training to enter active military service, but the war ended before he was commissioned.

After the war, Corbett was appointed to the Port of Portland Commission. During the post-war period, he also served as president of the Northwest Rivers and Harbors Congress. In addition, he continued to serve on company boards of directors, including those of the Ladd and Tilton Bank and the First National Bank. In 1926, Corbett and his brothers built the ten-story Pacific Building on property they owned across the street from the Pioneer Courthouse in Portland. The building site was once the garden and cow pasture of their grandfather, Henry W. Corbett and his adjoining home was still occupied by his widow.

== Political career ==
Corbett was an active Republican. In 1922, he was elected to fill a Multnomah County vacancy in the Oregon State Senate. He served in the Oregon legislature's 1923 regular session before running for a full senate term in 1924. During the session he gained a reputation as an advocate of efficient government and low taxes.

Corbett won his 1924 senate race by the largest margin ever given a senate candidate from Multnomah County. His four-year term allowed him to serve in both the 1925 and 1927 regular sessions. During the 1927–1928 legislative session, he was elected President of the Senate by his peers. As President of the Senate, he served as acting governor of Oregon twice in 1927 when Governor I. L. Patterson was traveling outside the state.

Corbett was then re-elected to the Senate in 1928 and served in the 1929 regular session. However, he left the senate in 1931 to run for governor, but was defeated. In 1932, he ran again for a state senate seat representing Multnomah County and was re-elected. During this four-year term, he serve in the 1933 and 1935 regular sessions plus three special sessions, two in 1933 and the other in 1935. During the 1935–1936 legislative session, he was elected President of the Senate for a second time.

== More business and public service ==
In 1940, Corbett was elected to the Southern Pacific board of directors. He remained a member of the Southern Pacific board for the next seventeen years. Corbett also continued to serve on the Port of Portland Commission, assuming the role of commission president. As president of the port commission, he helped the United States War Department lease land for a Portland area air base in 1941.

During World War II, Corbett was a member of the joint military-civilian committee that oversaw emergency defenses for the Port of Portland, ensuring wartime operations were not interrupted. In 1943, he was appointed to the Northwest Region War Labor Board. The board was responsible for making wartime wage determination decisions, ensuring that local labor disputes did not affect the war effort. He also led a wartime blood drive for the Portland area Red Cross.

== Later life ==
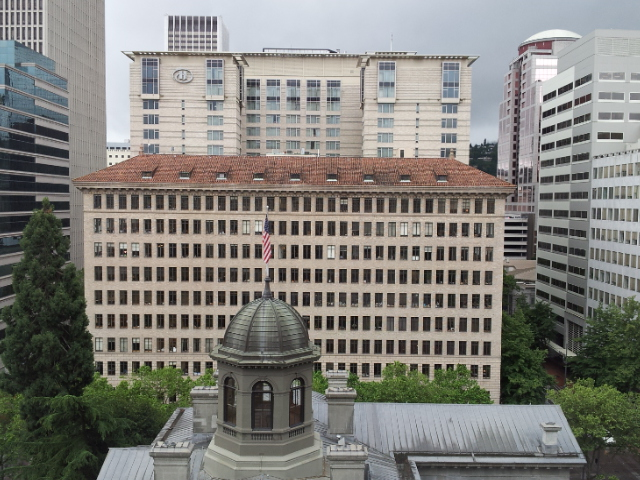
Corbett sold the Pacific Building in 1956.

When he retired from the port commission in 1951, Corbett had served for over 25 years, including 13 years as president of the commission. Corbett remained active in civic and business affairs into the mid-1950s. He was Oregon state chairman of the Crusade for Freedom in 1954, a national campaign to raise funds for Radio Free Europe. In 1956, the real estate holding company owned by Corbett and his two brothers, sold several of its downtown buildings. The properties included the Pacific Building, the ten-story Corbett Building, and the Corbett Brothers Auto Storage Garage plus two quarter-block lots in downtown Portland.

In 1952, Corbett and his wife gave the state of Oregon 63 acres (25 ha) on the east slope of the Cascade Range, adjacent to Blue Lake Crater near Highway 20, for a state park. The park honors their youngest son, Elliott R. Corbett II, who was killed in Europe during World War II while serving as an infantryman in the United States Army.

Corbett died of a heart attack on 22 April 1957 in Dunsmuir, California, while traveling home to Oregon from Santa Barbara, California. He was survived by his wife, Gretchen Hoyt Corbett, and four of their five children, Helen E. Corbett, Henry L. Corbett Jr., Alfred H. Corbett, and Rosina C. Morgan, plus six grandchildren. His two younger brothers, Elliott R. Corbett and Hamilton F. Corbett, also out lived him. He was buried at River View Cemetery in Portland, Oregon.

== Legacy ==
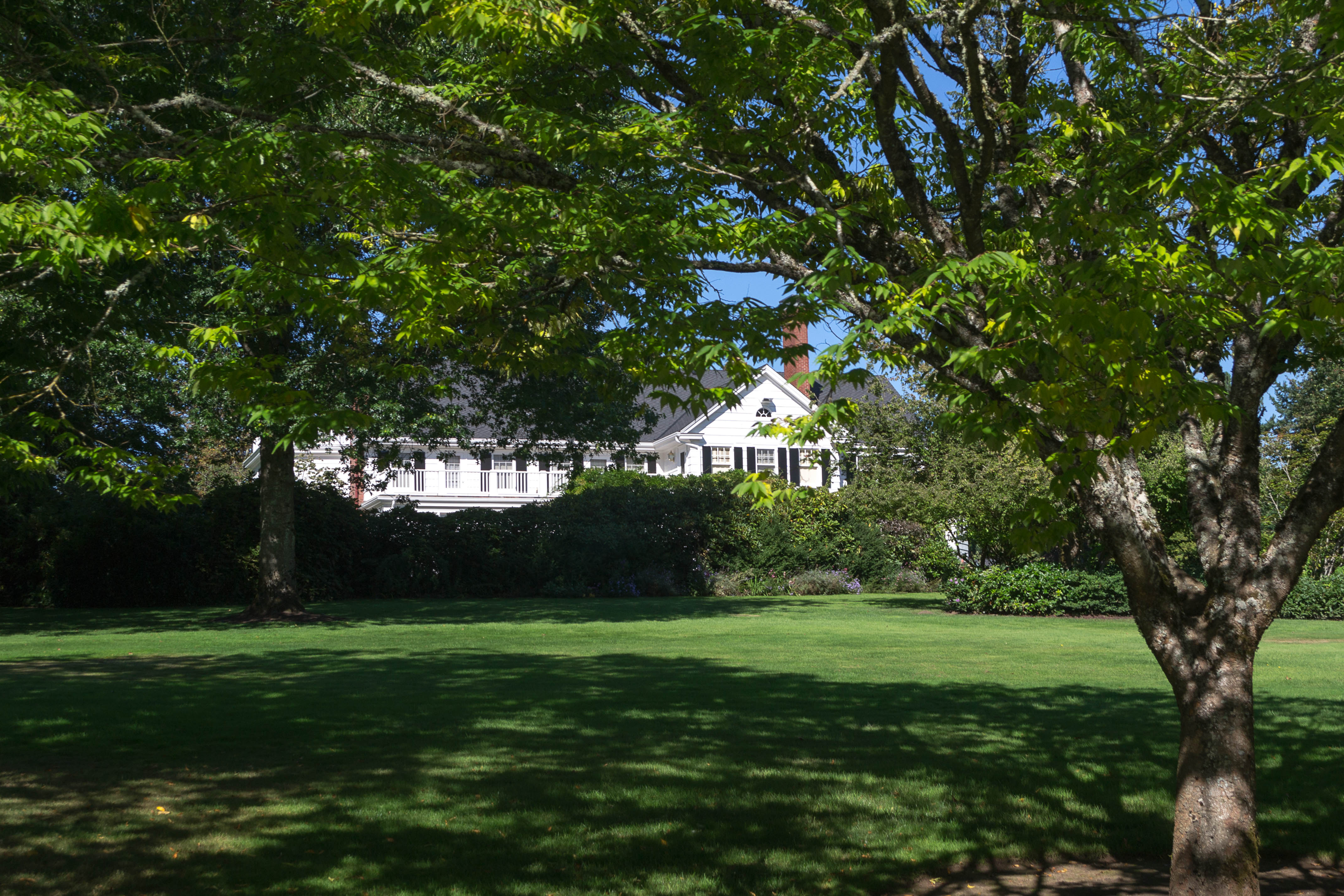
Historic H. L. Corbett House in Portland

On 23 April 1957, the Oregon legislature passed a joint resolution honoring Corbett. The legislature recognized Corbett for his distinguished service to the Oregon state, specifically highlighting his two terms as president of the state senate.

The home Corbett built in 1916 still stands in southwest Portland. He lived in the house with his wife until his death in 1957. His wife continued to live there until her death in 1978. Today, the house is listed on the National Register of Historic Places as the H. L. and Gretchen Hoyt Corbett House.

The Pacific Building, built by Corbett and his brothers, is now a historic landmark in downtown Portland. Today, the classic ten-story office building is listed on the National Register of Historic Places.

Elliott Corbett Memorial State Recreation Site is a 63 acres (25 ha) state park on the east slope of the Cascade Range in Jefferson County, Oregon. The park is a small wilderness area administered by the Oregon Parks and Recreation Department.
