= Gus C. Moser =

Attorney and state legislator in Oregon (1870–1937)

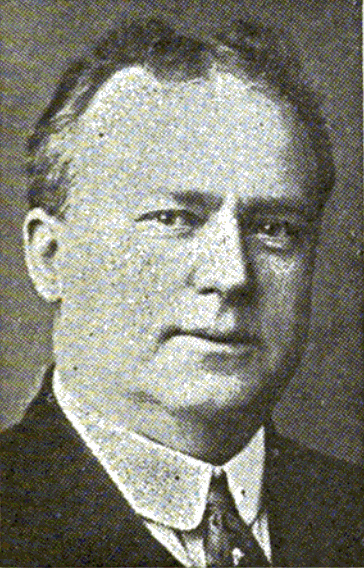
- Oregon senate president Gus Moser, 1921

23rd President of the Oregon State Senate
- In office 1925–1926
- Preceded by: Jay H. Upton
- Succeeded by: Henry L. Corbett
- In office 1917–1918
- Preceded by: W. Lair Thompson
- Succeeded by: William T. Vinton

Member of the Oregon Senate from the 13th district
- In office 1913–1932
- Constituency: Multnomah County

Personal details
- Born: Gustavus Charles Moser; November 15, 1870 Alma, Wisconsin, U.S.
- Died: April 2, 1937 (aged 66) Portland, Oregon, U.S.
- Political party: Republican
- Spouse: Sara Meta Keats (m. 1898)
- Profession: Attorney

Gustavus Charles Moser (November 15, 1870 – April 2, 1937) was an American attorney and state legislator from Portland, Oregon. He served twenty years in the Oregon State Senate from 1913 through 1932. Moser was a conservative Republican who represented Multnomah County in the state senate. He was President of the Oregon State Senate twice. The first time was during the 1917–1918 legislative term and then again during the 1925–1926 term. He also served as acting governor for a week in 1926. Moser was a successful attorney who practiced law from 1894 until his death in 1937. As a young lawyer, he served as Multnomah County's deputy district attorney. In that position, he argued several cases before the Oregon Supreme Court. Later, he was appointed chief legal counsel for the Port of Portland.

== Early life ==
Moser was born on November 15, 1870, in Alma, Wisconsin. He was the son of Fred and Anna (Arne) Moser. Both his parents were born in Berne, Switzerland. After immigrating to the United States, his father operated a dairy farm in Wisconsin. Moser grew up on his family's farm and attended local public schools. At age 14, he started earning room and board by doing farm chores in Mondovi, Wisconsin. He worked his way through high school. He then taught school and sold books, and did farm work for three years to pay for college. He attended Northern Indiana Normal School in Valparaiso, Indiana, majoring in business and law. However, he did not finish college due to illness and lack of funds.

In 1891, Moser moved to Portland, Oregon. He arrived in Oregon with only a few dollars in his pocket and no personal connections in the area. He found a job as a law clerk in the office of W. M Gregory. In 1894, he passed the Oregon State Bar and began practicing law in Portland. He specialized in corporate and admiralty law. Moser also served for three years in the Oregon National Guard as a member of Company F of Oregon's Third Regiment, eventually becoming the company's first sergeant. On July 20, 1898, he married a local schoolteacher, Sara Meta Keats.

In 1904, Moser was appointed chief deputy district attorney for Oregon's fourth judicial district, which served Multnomah County. He served in that position for four years. During that time, he prosecuted a number of high-profile cases, including several that he personally argued before the Oregon Supreme Court. The incumbent district attorney was a Democrat while Moser was a Republican. In 1908, he resigned his position as deputy district attorney to run for district attorney. However, he lost his bid for the district attorney position in the Republican primary, finishing third in a field of seven candidates. Later that year, Moser was elected vice president of the Multnomah County Bar Association.

== State senator ==
Moser served five four-year terms in the Oregon State Senate. He was first elected in 1912 and took his seat in January 1913 and continued serving in the state senate until he was defeated in the 1932 Republican primary. His final term expired at the end of 1932. He was twice elected president of the Oregon senate by his fellow senators, once unanimously (less his own vote) and the second time missing a unanimous endorsement by only two votes (again, one of those two votes was his own). His two stints in senate leadership were non-consecutive two-year terms in 1917–1918 and 1925–1926. While he was senate president in 1926, he served as acting governor for a week.

=== First term ===
In 1912, Moser announced he would run for a seat in the Oregon State Senate, representing Multnomah County. He campaigned in favor of direct election of United States senators (instead of senators being elected by state legislatures). He supported joint state and county financing of Oregon road construction projects and taxpayer funding of a bridge over the Columbia River north of Portland.

Seven Republican candidates filed to fill Multnomah County's five open senate seats. Moser was one of five Republicans nominated in the party's primary to advance to the general election. The other Republican nominees were Isaac N. Day, Robert S. Farrell, Dan Kellaher, and T. L. Perkins. The two candidates who were eliminated in the primary were C. W. Hodson and George M. Hyland. Moser and Day endorsed William H. Taft for re-election, while the other three Republicans supported Theodore Roosevelt and were endorsed by Bull Moose Party. Oregon's largest newspaper, The Oregonian endorsed Moser, Day, Farrell, Perkins, and Democrat Richard W. Montague. In the general election, Multnomah County voters elected the five Republican candidates to fill the county's open state senate seats. Moser finished fourth with 10,902 votes. Farrell received 12,828 votes, the most of any candidate; followed by Kellaher with 11,450 and Perkins with 11,079. Day finished behind Moser with 10,261 votes. The four Democrats and two progressive (Bull Moose Party) candidates ran far behind the Republicans. The best of them was over a thousand votes behind Day.

Moser took his seat in the Oregon State Senate on January 13, 1913, representing District 13. When the session was organized, he was appointed chairman of the judiciary committee. He also served on the insurance, railroads, and resolutions committees. He served through the 27th regular session of the legislature which ended on March 5.

Since Oregon's state senators served four-year terms, Moser did not have to run for re-election prior to the 1915 legislative session. He took his District 13 senate seat when the session opened on January 11. During the session, he served as chairman of the judiciary committee. He also served on the claims, engrossed bills, and railroads committees. The 1915 legislative session was adjourned on February 20.

=== Second term ===
In 1916, Moser decided to run for a second four-year term. He announced his re-election bid in January 1916. Twelve Republicans filed for six state senate seats representing Multnomah County. Five were for four-year terms and one was a two-year term to replace a senator who had resigned mid-term. Eleven candidates were running for the four-year terms with just one, John K. Gill, running for the two-year seat. Moser was among those seeking four-year terms. The other candidates were Robert S. Farrell, C. W. Hodson, Samuel B. Huston, F. O. Lehman, Conrad P. Olson, Arthur W. Orton, Dr. H. M. Patton, Dan Powers, F. H. Ransom, and John C. Shillock. No Democrats filed for election.

The Republican primary narrowed the field to six candidates. Gill of course won the two-year term since he was unopposed for that seat. Moser was the top vote getter among those seeking four-year terms, receiving 19,063 votes. He was followed by Olson with 18,363 votes; Huston with 16,822; Orton with 14,082; and Farrell with 13,415 votes. The candidates who fell short ranged from Patton with 11,941 votes down to Lehman who got only 5,141 votes. Since no Democrats had filed, the Republicans nominees were unopposed in the general election.

The 1917 legislative session began on January 8. The Oregon senate was made up of 24 Republicans, 5 Democrats, and 1 independent. When the senate was organized, Moser was unanimously (except for Moser, who voted for another senator out of modesty) elected president of that body. Moser started the session by making committee assignments and highlighting three challenges he believed the senate needed to address. He said the senate should support taxpayers by promoting economy in state institutions. He also wanted to pass good roads legislation and a rural credit bill. After a six-week session, Moser adjourned the senate, closing 1917 legislative session on February 19.

Once again, Moser did not have to run for re-election in 1918. On January 13, 1919, he took his seat in the state legislature representing Multnomah County's senate District 13. He was appointed chairman of the judiciary committee. During the session, he also served on the commerce and navigation, insurance, railroads, and resolutions committees. The 1919 legislative session ended on February 27. Moser also served during a special legislative session in early 1920 that ran for a week beginning on January 12.

=== Third term ===
Moser announced he would run for re-election in 1920. He was 1 of 15 candidates seeking the Republican nomination for five open Multnomah County state senates. He campaigned for good roads, industrial development, port expansion, and a commitment to anti-bolshevism. In the primary, Republican voters would nominate five candidates to advance to the general election.

In the Republican primary, Moser was one of five candidates nominated to advance to the general election. The other four were: Robert S. Farrell, Wilson T. Hume, George W. Joseph, and Isaac E. Staples. There was only one Democrat on the primary ballot, Elmer R. Lundburg, so he was automatically posted to the general election ballot along with the five Republicans. Moser and his four fellow Republicans won all the Multnomah County's senate seats. While Moser finished fifth in the general election, that was still good enough to earn a place in the senate. The vote tally was as follows: Joseph received 37,676 votes followed by Hume with 36,777, Farrell with 36,752; Staples with 36,671, Moser with 33,451. Lundburg, the only Democrat in the race, received only 17,782 votes, not enough to win a senate seat.

The 1921 legislative session began on January 10. Once again, Moser was representing Multnomah County's District 13. During the session, he served as chairman of the judiciary committee. He was also appointed to the commerce and navigation, fishing industries, insurance, railroads, and resolutions committees. The 1921 session lasted about six weeks and was adjourned on February 23.

Moser began the second half of his four-year senate term on January 8 when the 1923 legislative session was opened for business. During that session the senate was made up of 26 Republicans and 4 Democrats. When the senate began organizing, Moser was elected temporary president while senators debated who should be senate president. The conflict was between two Republicans, Jay Upton of Prineville and Benjamin L. Eddy of Roseburg. Upton was eventually elected president, receiving support from 16 of the chamber's 30 senators. Upton appointed Moser chairman of revisions of laws committee. Moser also served on the commerce and navigation, fishing industries, insurance, railroads and utilities, and resolutions committees. The 1923 legislative session was adjourned on February 22.

=== Fourth term ===
In April 1924, Moser announced his bid for re-election to the state senate. In the Republicans' primary, voters nominated Moser, William W. Banks, Henry L. Corbett, George W. Joseph, and Isaac E. Staples for Multnomah County's five open District 13 state senate seats. The county's Democrats nominated R. W. Harwood, George A. Lovejoy, Ogleshy Young, and A. S. Zemp. In the 1924 general election, the five Republicans were elected to fill Multnomah County's open senate seats.

The 1925 regular legislative session was opened on January 12. Moser, the longest-serving member of the senate, was unopposed for the senate president position. However, when the senate was organized, he was not unanimously elected, receiving 28 of 30 votes from his peers. One of the two opposing votes was Moser himself, who voted for Henry L. Corbett out of modesty. The other vote was cast by fellow Multnomah County Republican George Joseph, who was a long-time political enemy of Moser. The session lasted a little over six weeks. Moser adjourned the 1925 legislative session on February 26. At that time the president of the state senate served as acting governor whenever the elected governor was out of the state. In 1926, Moser served as acting governor for a week while the Governor Walter M. Pierce was traveling out of the state.

Moser did not have to run for re-election before the start of the 1927 legislative session. That session began on January 10 and lasted through February 25. During the session, Moser served as chairman of the judiciary committee. He was also a member of the commerce and navigation, fishing industries, industries, and railroads and utilities committees.

=== Fifth term ===
Moser filed for re-election in 1928. That year, there were eight Republicans running for five open Multnomah County senate seats, including Moser. The other seven were John O. Bailey, W. W. Banks, Jacob E. Bennett; Henry L. Corbett, Herbert Gordon, Norman S. Richards, and Isaac Staples. Frank E. Manning was the only Multnomah County Democrat to file for a senate seat. Moser, Bailey, Bennett, Corbett, and Staples were nominated by Republican voters in their primary, and then went on to win the general election.

Oregon's 1929 regular legislative session began on January 14 with Moser once again representing District 13. He was again appointed chairman of the judiciary committee. He also served on the commerce and navigation, insurance, railroads and utilities, resolutions, and rules committees during the session. The 1929 session lasted through March 4.

Because it was the middle of his four-year term, Moser did not have to run for re-election prior to the 1931 session. During the session, he served as chairman of the judiciary committee. He was also a member of the commerce and navigation, fishing industries, insurance, penal institutions, railroads and utilities, resolutions, and rules committees. The 1931 session adjourned on March 6.

In 1932, Moser once again ran for re-election. However, he did not receive enough votes to make it through the Republican primary. He finished sixth in a field where the first five became the Republican nominees in the general election.

Prior to the general election, one of five Republicans nominated for a state senate seat representing Multnomah County withdrew from the race. As a result, the Multnomah County Republican central committee was required to nominate a backfill candidate. Moser had finished sixth in the primary, just one place short of the fifth place cutoff. Local newspapers speculated that he might be the replacement nominee. Moser was one of four individuals who filed to fill the vacant Republican state senate nominee position on the general election ballot. The other three were Henry L. Corbett, Harry Cross, and Walter Lynn. Ultimately, the Republican central committee selected Corbett to fill the vacant state senate candidate position.

== Later life ==
After leaving the state senate, Moser returned to his Portland law practice on a full-time basis. He had been appointed chief counsel for the Port of Portland in 1919. After Moser took that position, he actively supported the Port authority when the legislature was out of session. He also represented the Swiss consulate in Portland and several large estates. He served as president of the Multnomah County Bar Association and was a member of the Oregon State Bar and American Bar Association.

Moser stayed engaged in politics by using his legal and legislative expertise to lobby Oregon legislators on behalf of clients. In 1933, Moser suffered a heart attack while lobbying at the Oregon state capitol on behalf of a small loan company. He soon recovered and went on with his law practice. This included representing the Port of Portland in an important case that acquired land for the future Portland Airport.

In the community, Moser was a member of the local Chamber of Commerce's legislative committee, the Portland's Commercial Club, the Portland Ad Club, the Progressive Businessmen's Club, Multnomah Golf Club, and the Multnomah Athletic Club. He was also the attorney for the Portland Baseball Club and a director of that organization.

Moser was a member of the Portland Elks lodge and served as lodge president in 1909–1910. He attended the Elks' 1911 national convention in Atlantic City, New Jersey. At the convention, he delivered a speech that secured the 1912 convention for Portland. Then, through his influence, brought the Elks' national convention back to Portland in 1925. He was also a founding member of Portland's Knights of Pythias lodge, which was established in 1916. He was also president of that organization and attended their 1914 international convention in Winnipeg, Canada. In addition, Moser was a member of the Dramatic Order of the Knights of Khorassan, the Knights of the Maccabees, the Loyal Order of Moose, and the Woodmen of the World. He was also a Knight Templar Mason.

Moser died on April 2, 1937, at his home in Portland, Oregon. He died of a heart ailment brought on by pneumonia. He was 66 years old at the time of his death. His funeral service was organized by the Knights of Pythias and held on February 5, 1937. After the service, he was interred at Wilhelm's Portland Memorial Funeral Home.
