= Jay H. Upton =

American politician

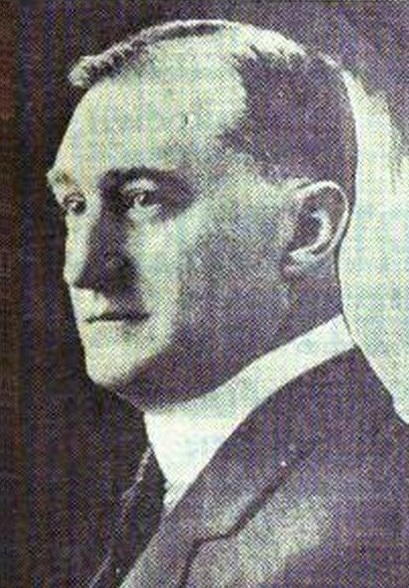
- Oregon Senate President Jay Upton, 1922

26th President of the Oregon State Senate
- In office 1923–1924
- Preceded by: Dan J. Malarkey
- Succeeded by: Gus C. Moser

Member of the Oregon Senate from the 17th district
- In office 1921–1934
- Preceded by: George T. Baldwin
- Succeeded by: N. G. Wallace
- Constituency: Crook, Deschutes, Jefferson, Klamath, and Lake counties

Member of the Oregon House of Representatives from the 18th district
- In office 1911–1912
- Preceded by: Willis I. Cottel
- Succeeded by: Oscar W. Horne

Personal details
- Born: April 28, 1879 Colfax, Washington
- Died: December 30, 1938 (aged 59) Portland, Oregon
- Party: Republican
- Profession: Attorney

Jay Hollister Upton (April 28, 1879 – December 30, 1938) was an American politician and attorney from the state of Oregon. He was a conservative Republican who served two years in the Oregon House of Representatives; and later, fourteen years in the Oregon State Senate. In the senate, Upton represented a large rural district in eastern Oregon. He served as President of the Oregon Senate during the 1923 legislative session. Upton ran for Governor of Oregon and for the United States Congress from Oregon's 2nd congressional district, but lost both of those elections.

== Early life ==
Upton was born on 28 April 1879 in Colfax, Washington, the son of James B. and Anna Amanda (Shaw) Upton. His father was a lawyer, and his grandfather, William W. Upton, was one of the first judges to serve on the Oregon Supreme Court. His family moved to Portland, Oregon when he was an infant. Upton grew up in Portland, where he attended public schools. He graduated from high school there in 1898.

At the outbreak of the Spanish–American War, Upton joined the United States Army. He served as a private in Company H of the 2nd Oregon Volunteer Infantry Regiment and participated in the capture of Guam and the Philippine campaigns. Upton remained in the Oregon National Guard after the war. By 1911, he was serving as sergeant major of the 3rd Regiment of Oregon Infantry.

After the war, Upton attended the University of Oregon, graduating with law degree in May 1902. After graduation, he became a law clerk for Multnomah County judge Lionel R. Webster, a position he held for three years. In 1905, Upton began a private law practice in Portland, focusing on real estate and probate law. As a young professional, he joined a number of civic organizations including the local Elks and Eagles lodges as well as the United Spanish War Veterans association. On 28 April 1909, he married Maude J. Cannon in Portland.

== State representative ==
Upton, a Republican, ran for a Multnomah County seat the Oregon House of Representatives in 1912. At that time, Multnomah County had twelve House seats, all part of District 18. Upton was one of twelve Republicans nominees selected in the primary to represent the party in the general election. In the general election, Republicans won 11 of 12 seats in the Multnomah County delegation. Upton finished twelfth in field of 51 candidates, securing the last available District 18 seat.

Upton took his seat in the Oregon House on 13 January 1913, serving through the 1913 regular legislative session which ended in early March. During the session, Upton served as chairman of House Exposition Committee. His committee was responsible for reviewing plans and recommending funding for Oregon's exhibits at the San Francisco and San Diego exhibitions planned for 1915.

After the legislative session ended, Upton returned to his law practice in Portland. A year later, in 1914, he moved to Prineville in central Oregon.

== Central Oregon ==
Upton built a successful law practice in Prineville. He also bought an 880 acres (360 ha) ranch in the Prineville area. In his law practice, he specialized in irrigation and water rights cases. He organized the Ochoco Irrigation District and was president of the Oregon Irrigation Congress for two years. In Prineville, he continued as a member of the Elks and Eagles, serving as lodge president for both organizations. He joined the Knights of Pythias and served as the local commander of that fraternal lodge as well. He also remained active in the United Spanish War Veterans association, and was elected state commander of that veterans group.

When World War I began in Europe, Upton recruited a volunteer regiment and was selected as the unit's captain. However, the unit was never called to active duty. During that same period, Upton helped the legislature update the state's water and irrigation laws. He also promoted agricultural interests throughout Oregon and advocated for dams, land reclamation, and irrigation projects.

== State senator (1921–24) ==
In 1920, Upton decided to run for the state senate representing District 17. This senate district included Crook, Deschutes, Jefferson, Klamath, and Lake counties. It was the largest legislative district in Oregon, covering almost 25 percent of state's area.

Upton campaigned for better roads in eastern Oregon, more investments in irrigation projects, improved rural school facilities, and anti-communist patriotism. He won the Republican primary, easily defeating Wilson S. Willy of Klamath Falls. The incumbent senator, George T. Baldwin, won the Democratic primary. However, Baldwin died a month after the primary and was not replaced on the general election ballot. As a result, Upton was unopposed in the general election. Upton took his seat in the Oregon State Senate on 10 January 1921, serving through the 1921 regular session plus a short special session in December of that year.

Since Oregon state senators serve a four-year term, Upton did not have to run for re-election prior to the opening of the 1923 legislative session. Once the November 1914 general election was over, he began actively seeking support for the senate president position. By mid-November, Upton had commitments from 18 senators, two more than was needed to be elected President of the Senate. However, four senators switch their allegiance to other senators, leaving Upton one vote short. Eventually, the senators settled into two camps, 15 supporting Upton and 14 supporting Senator B. L. Eddy of Roseburg with one Portland senator undecided. The Portland senator, Gus C. Moser, was very unpopular with eastern Oregon senators who universally supported Upton. Some of these eastern Oregon senators threatened to leave Upton if Moser supported him. However, after Upton personally assured the eastern Oregon senators he would not make any special deals with Moser, they agreed to continue to support him. Moser's support gave Upton the 16 votes he needed to become President of the Senate. In the end, Upton, was elected senate president by one vote. His supporters included three of the senate's four Democrats, all three from eastern Oregon.

The 1923 legislative session opened on 8 January with Upton as the presiding officer in the senate. During the six-week session, the legislature passed a bill that created a new state office to promote settlement in irrigated agricultural areas of the state. It also defeated a proposed mileage tax that Upton opposed. At the end of the session, fellow senators, including Senator Eddy, lauded Upton leadership of the senate. Newspaper editorials also commended Upton for his outstanding service as senate president, noting his bipartisan committee appointments and fairness as presiding officer during debates.

At that time, the President of the Senate served as acting governor whenever Oregon's elected governor left the state. During his two-year term as senate president, Upton was the acting governor on several occasions when Governor Walter M. Pierce was traveling outside of the state.

== State senator (1925–34) ==
Upton filed for re-election to his state senate in April 1924. He was opposed in the Republican primary by E. E. Varco of Vale. Upton won the primary. In the general election, he faced Democrat, P. E. Burke of Klamath Falls. Upton easily won that election with 5,066 votes to Burke's 3,007. Upton began his second four-year term serving in the 1925 legislative session from 12 January through 26 February.

In November 1925, Upton announced that he would run for Governor of Oregon. He officially filed for the Republican nomination in March 1926. In the three-way race for the Republican nomination, Upton came in second behind I. L. Patterson, receiving 38,048 votes against Patterson's 62,663. After the primary, Upton endorsed Patterson and campaigned for him in eastern Oregon. Patterson went on to win the governorship in the general election.

Because he was elected to a four-year senate term, Upton did not lose his senate seat when he ran for governor. As a result, he continued his senate service during the 1927 legislative session. The session began on 10 January and lasted through 25 February. During the session, Upton was appointed as chairman of senate Game Committee, the senate committee that handled wildlife and hunting laws. He was also a member of the judiciary, assessment and taxation, irrigation and drainage, and public lands committees.

Upton ran for a third senate term in 1928. He was unopposed in both the Republican primary and the general election. Following the election, he served in the 1929 legislative session from early January through early March. During the session, Upton was appointed chairman of the Railroads and Utilities Committee. He also served as a member of judiciary, roads and highways, banking, and resolutions committees.

In December 1929, Governor Patterson died in office. The news media quickly identified Upton as a possible candidate for governor. Upton told the newspapers he considered running for governor, but could not arranged campaign financing in time for the special election. Instead, he endorsed Governor A. W. Norblad, who as President of the Senate, had inherited the position when Patterson died. However, Norblad was beaten in the Republican primary by George W. Joseph. Then, Joseph died of a heart attack just a few weeks after the primary. Upton once again endorsed Norblad as the backfill candidate after the death of Joseph, but Norblad decided not to seek the nomination. The selection was made by the state's Republican Central Committee. Upton was one of six candidates considered by the committee. However, the committee nominated its chairman, Phil Metschan, as the party's candidate for governor. Metschan lost the 1930 general election to an independent candidate, Julius Meier.

As the new governor took office, Upton returned to the state senate. He served through the 1931 session from 12 January through 6 March. During the session, Upton was chairman of the Insurance Committee and the Irrigation and Drainage Committee. He also served on the judiciary, military affairs, railroads and utilities, roads and highways, and banking committees.

In 1932, Upton ran for a fourth term in the senate. Once again, he was unopposed in both the Republican primary and the general election. The 1933 legislative session began with a special session held during the first week of January followed a regular session that lasted two months. A second special session was held in late November and early December. During these sessions, Upton served as chairman of the Judiciary Committee. He was also a member of six other committees including banking, insurance, game, irrigation and drainage, road and highways, and alcohol control. Prior to the second special session, Governor Meier appointed Upton to a special commission charged with recommending regulations to control liquor distribution and sales in Oregon following repeal of Prohibition in the United States.

In early 1934, newspapers began reporting that Upton was likely to run for Congress in Oregon's 2nd Congressional District, which represented eastern Oregon. In March, he filed for the Republican nomination for the 2nd District seat. He easily beat David Graham of Vale in the Republican primary while the incumbent Congressman, Walter M. Pierce, was unopposed in the Democratic primary. After the primary, Upton resigned his seat in the state senate so he could focus on his Congress race. In the general election vote count, Upton took an early lead, but Pierce eventually won. The final vote was 29,221 for Pierce, 21,255 for Upton, and 1,034 for O. D. Teel, a socialist candidate.

== Later life ==
After losing the Congressional race, Upton returned to central Oregon where he continued his law practice and his ranching activities. As a lawyer, Upton handled a wide variety of legal cases. He represented the public institutions like the Bend School District as well as numerous private clients. Upton also continued his involved with local fraternal and civic organizations including the Elks, Eagles, Moose, Masons, Woodsmen of the World, Kiwanis, and the local Chamber of Commerce. He spoke at public events and Republican gatherings around the state. He was especially outspoken in his opposition to the policies of President Franklin D. Roosevelt.

In 1937, he was elected to the Bend Chamber of Commerce board of directors. Later that year, he was selected as chairman of the organizing committee for the United Spanish War Veterans national encampment to be held in Portland the following year. During the actual event in 1938, Upton was the chairman of the Spanish War veterans' nation convention. Upton also remained active in the Oregon Bar Association. He was appointed to the association's governing committee for a two-year term starting in 1938.

== Death and legacy ==
On 30 December 1938, Upton was killed in an automobile accident on U.S. Route 26 near Rhododendron, Oregon. The accident occurred as Upton, his wife, and another passenger were returning to central Oregon from a visit to Portland. The road was icy and Upton's vehicle skidded off-road into the Zigzag River. Upton and the other passengers were pulled from the vehicle by a party of skiers. The three injured individuals were taken to the Zigzag Civilian Conservation Corps camp located about a mile from the accident scene where they were treated by the camp doctor before being transported to a Portland hospital. Upton died on the way to the hospital. Upton's wife and the other passenger both recovered from their injuries.

On 3 January 1939, a large public funeral was held for Upton in Portland. The funeral service was overflowing with friends and admirers; many of them drove across the Cascade Mountains from central Oregon to attend the service. In addition, there were over 150 floral arrangements sent to the church for the ceremony.

Upton was honored by the Oregon Bar Association and the United Spanish War Veterans association with memorial resolutions at statewide events in 1939. The United Spanish War Veterans also renamed their central Oregon camp after Upton.
