= 26th Oregon Legislative Assembly =

←	25th Legislative Assembly	27th Legislative Assembly	→
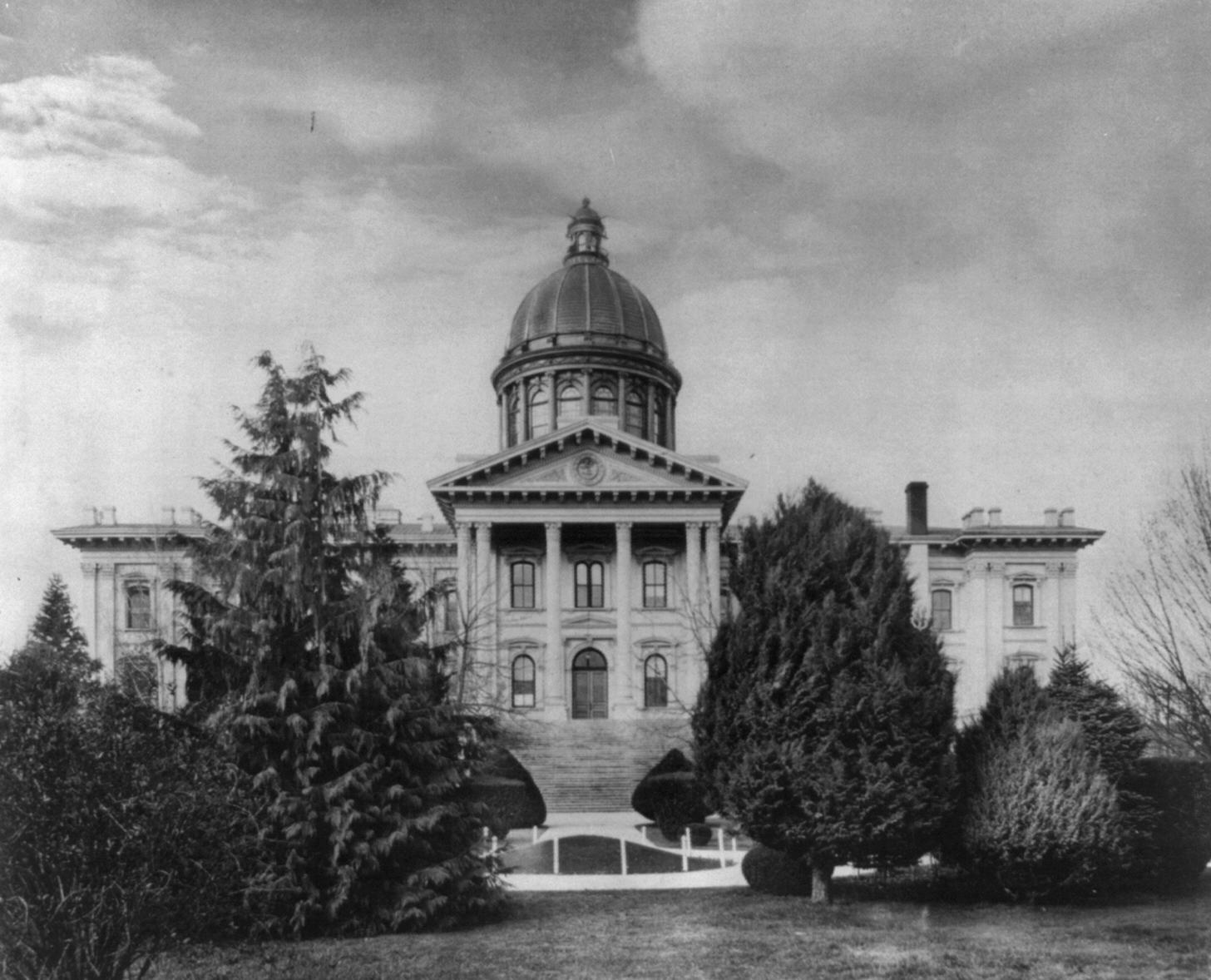
- The legislature took place in the second Oregon State Capitol, seen here in 1909

Overview
- Legislative body: Oregon Legislative Assembly
- Jurisdiction: Oregon, United States
- Meeting place: Oregon State Capitol
- Term: 1911
- Website: www.oregonlegislature.gov

Oregon State Senate
- Members: 30 Senators
- Senate President: Ben Selling (R)
- Party control: Republican Party of Oregon

Oregon House of Representatives
- Members: 60 Representatives
- Speaker of the House: John P. Rusk (R)
- Party control: Republican Party of Oregon

The 26th Oregon Legislative Assembly was the legislative session of the Oregon Legislative Assembly that convened on January 9, 1911 and adjourned February 18, 1911.

== Senate ==
Affiliation	Members
Democratic	3
Republican	26
Independent	1
Total	30

=== Senate Members ===
Composition of the Senate
Senator	Residence	Party
Albert Abraham	Roseburg	Republican
H. Russell Albee	Portland	Republican
C. A. Barrett	Athena	Republican
William N. Barrett	Hillsboro	Republican
L. E. Bean	Eugene	Republican
Jay Bowerman	Condon	Republican
J. N. Burgess	Pendleton	Republican
W. W. Calkins	Eugene	Republican
John A. Carson	Salem	Republican
W. C. Chase	Coquille	Republican
W. A. Dimick	Oregon City	Republican
C. L. Hawley	McCoy	Republican
J. L. Hoskins	Newberg	Republican
George W. Joseph	Portland	Republican
Dan Kellaher	Portland	Republican
C. F. Lester	Warrenton	Republican
J. K. Locke	Portland	Republican
Dan J. Malarkey	Portland	Republican
Claude C. McColloch	Baker	Democratic
George H. Merryman	Klamath Falls	Republican
M. A. Miller	Lebanon	Democratic
H. D. Norton	Grants Pass	Independent
C. W. Nottingham	Portland	Republican
Turner Oliver	LaGrande	Democratic
C. W. Parrish	Izee	Republican
Hal D. Patton	Salem	Republican
Ben Selling	Portland	Republican
N. J. Sinnott	The Dalles	Republican
H. VonDerHellen	Wellen (Note: Community founded near White City by Hugo Von der Hellen. Currently a ghost town.)	Republican
W. D. Wood	Hillsboro	Republican

== House ==
Affiliation	Members
Democratic	2
Republican	57
Independent	1
Total	60

=== House Members ===
Composition of the House of Representatives
Representative	Residence	Party
James D. Abbott	Portland	Republican
Carl Abrams	Salem	Republican
James M. Ambrose	Portland	Republican
Edwin G. Amme	Portland	Republican
A. G. Beals	Tillamook	Republican
Horace P. Belknap	Prineville	Republican
L. O. Belland	Astoria	Republican
C. A. Bigelow	Portland	Republican
P. O. Bonebrake	Philomath	Republican
W. H. Brooke	Ontario	Republican
Timothy Brownhill	McMinnville	Independent
J. C. Bryant	Portland	Republican
J. A. Buchanan	Medford	Republican
C. A. Buckley	Grass Valley	Republican
E. P. Carter	Gladstone	Republican
F. W. Chambers	Toledo	Republican
J. A. Chapman	Middleton	Republican
W. H. Chatten	Oswego	Republican
William J. Church	La Grande	Republican
W. J. Clemens	Portland	Republican
Ralph C. Clyde	Portland	Republican
James Cole	Portland	Republican
Stephen Collins	Portland	Republican
W. I. Cottel	Portland	Republican
I. B. Cushman	Acme (Note: No longer populated locality; in Lane County.)	Republican
A. J. Derby	Hood River	Democratic
Allen H. Eaton	Eugene	Republican
M. F. Eggleston	Ashland	Republican
Seneca Fouts	Portland	Republican
F. M. Gill	Dufur	Republican
Roy Graves	Sheridan	Republican
W. H. Hollis	Forest Grove	Republican
Ben Huntington Jr.	Drain	Republican
George W. Johnson	Salem	Republican
Linn E. Jones	Oregon City	Republican
C. A. Leinenweber	Astoria	Republican
A. C. Libby	Jefferson	Republican
M. A. Magone	Oregon City	Republican
T. J. Mahoney	Heppner	Republican
L. L. Mann	Pendleton	Republican
W. J. Mariner	Blalock	Republican
Henry M. McKinney	Baker	Republican
J. W. Miller	Albany	Republican
M. E. Miller	St. Helens	Republican
George Neuner Jr.	Roseburg	Republican
S. P. Peirce	Port Orford	Republican
S. D. Peterson	Milton	Republican
Ira C. Powell	Monmouth	Republican
Ed Rackleff	Bandon	Republican
L. T. Reynolds	Salem	Republican
Allen G. Rushlight	Portland	Republican
John P. Rusk	Joseph	Republican
C. L. Shaw	Albany	Democratic
M. J. Simpson	Lebanon	Republican
J. C. Smith	Grants Pass	Republican
A. G. Steelhammer	Silverton	Republican
W. M. Sutton	Springfield	Republican
W. Lair Thompson	Lakeview	Republican
C. F. Tigard	Tigardville	Republican
J. A. Westerlund	Medford	Republican
