= 27th Oregon Legislative Assembly =

←	26th Legislative Assembly	28th Legislative Assembly	→
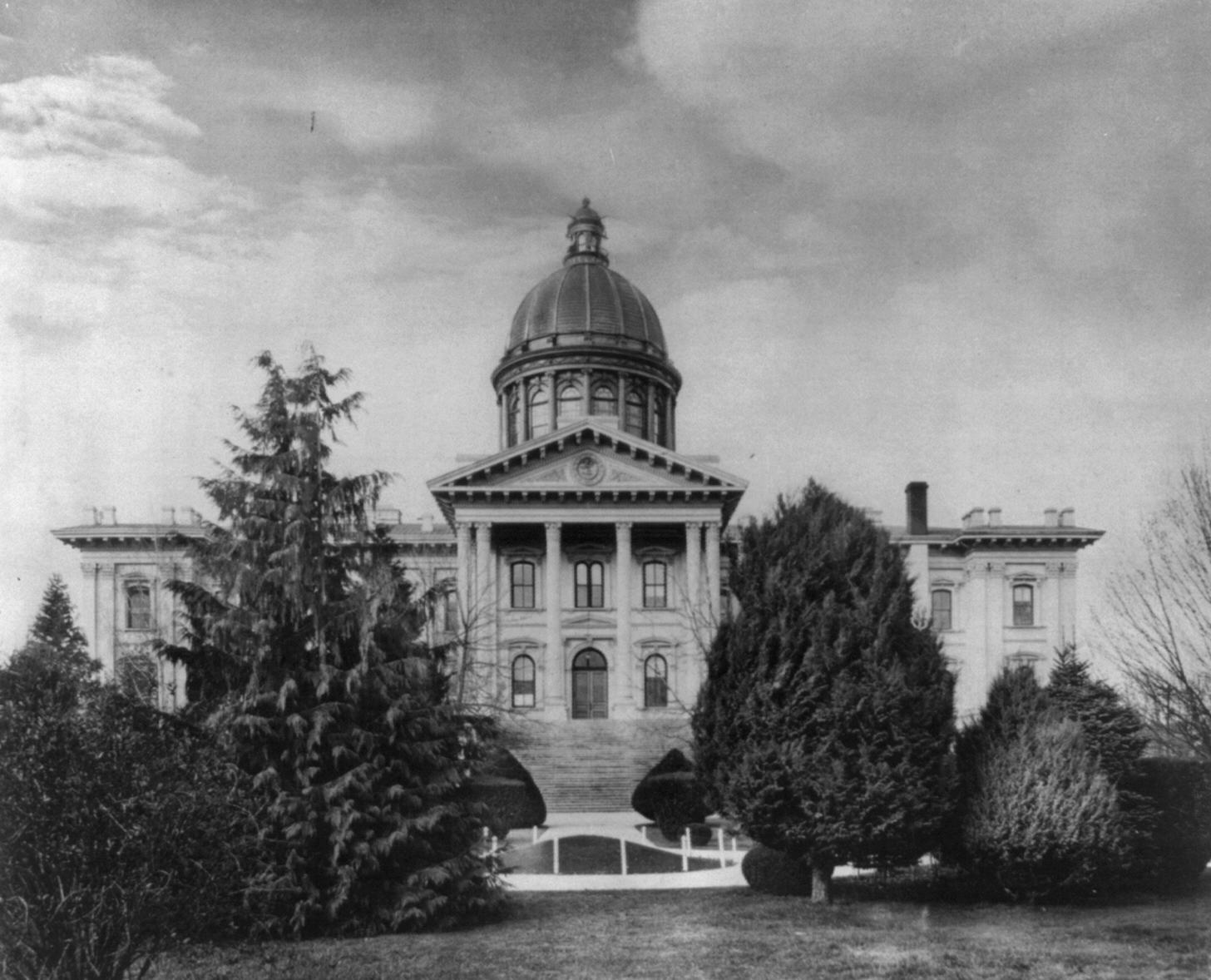
- The legislature took place in the second Oregon State Capitol, seen here in 1909

Overview
- Legislative body: Oregon Legislative Assembly
- Jurisdiction: Oregon, United States
- Meeting place: Oregon State Capitol
- Term: 1913
- Website: www.oregonlegislature.gov

Oregon State Senate
- Members: 30 Senators
- Senate President: Dan J. Malarkey (R)
- Party control: Republican Party of Oregon

Oregon House of Representatives
- Members: 60 Representatives
- Speaker of the House: C. N. McArthur (R)
- Party control: Republican Party of Oregon

The 27th Oregon Legislative Assembly was the legislative session of the Oregon Legislative Assembly that convened on January 13, 1913 and adjourned March 5, 1913.

== Senate ==
Affiliation	Members
Democratic	2
Republican	28
Total	30

=== Senate Members ===
Composition of the Senate
Senator	Residence	Party
C. A. Barrett	Athena	Republican
Isaac H. Bingham	Eugene	Republican
Charles Pleasant Bishop	Salem	Republican
J. N. Burgess	Pendleton	Republican
R. R. Butler	The Dalles	Republican
Kathryn Clarke	Roseburg	Republican
E. D. Cusick	Albany	Republican
I. N. Day	Portland	Republican
Walter A. Dimick	Oregon City	Republican
Robert S. Farrell	Portland	Republican
Samuel M. Garland	Lebanon	Democratic
C. L. Hawley	McCoy	Republican
W. H. Hollis	Forest Grove	Republican
Dan Kellaher	Portland	Republican
Edward E. Kiddle	Island City	Republican
A. M. LaFollett	Gervais	Republican
Arthur Langguth	Portland	Republican
C. A. Leinenweber	Astoria	Republican
George M. McBride	Portland	Republican
Gus C. Mozer	Portland	Republican
T. L. Perkins	Portland	Republican
W. H. Ragsdale	Moro	Republican
I. S. Smith	Marshfield	Republican
J. C. Smith	Grants Pass	Republican
Loring V. Stewart	Dayville	Republican
W. H. Strayer	Baker	Democratic
W. Lair Thompson	Lakeview	Republican
William T. Vinton	McMinnville	Republican
H. Von der Hellen	Wellen (Note: Community founded near White City by Hugo Von der Hellen. Currently a ghost town.)	Republican
W. D. Wood	Hillsboro	Republican

== House ==
Affiliation	Members
Democratic	5
Progressive Democrat	1
Republican	48
Progressive Republican	6
Total	60

=== House Members ===
Composition of the House of Representatives
Representative	Residence	Party
J. D. Abbott	Portland	Republican
A. A. Anderson	Astoria	Republican
J. E. Anderson	The Dalles	Republican
C. A. Applegren	Portland	Progressive Republican
J. S. Barton	Coquille	Republican
L. O. Belland	Astoria	Republican
E. E. Blanchard	Grants Pass	Republican
P. O. Bonebrake	Philomath	Republican
Thomas W. Brunk	Eola	Democratic
W. A. Campbell	Condon	Republican
John H. Carkin	Medford	Republican
L. G. Carpenter	Portland	Republican
John A. Chapman	Sherwood	Republican
Charles Childs	Brownsville	Republican
Allen H. Eaton	Eugene	Republican
Vernon A. Forbes	Bend	Republican
C. J. Forsstrom	Union	Republican
F. M. Gill	Estacada	Republican
Roy Graves	Sheridan	Republican
Robert W. Hagood	Portland	Progressive Democrat
W. A. Hall	Clatskanie	Republican
T. B. Handley Jr.	Tillamook	Republican
James G. Heltzel	Salem	Republican
Verd Hill	Independence	Democratic
J. T. Hinkle	Hermiston	Republican
W. F. Homan	Ontario	Democratic
J. K. Howard	Glendale	Democratic
Samuel A. Hughes	Salem	Republican
Calvin J. Hurd	Irving	Republican
George W. Johnson	Salem	Republican
J. R. Latourette	Portland	Republican
Sam Laughlin	Yamhill	Republican
A. W. Lawrence	Portland	Progressive Republican
L. G. Lewelling	Albany	Republican
David E. Lofgren	Portland	Progressive Republican
L. L. Mann	Pendleton	Republican
Virgil H. Massey	Cornelius	Republican
C. N. McArthur	Portland	Republican
John McDonald	Wallowa	Republican
S. A. D. Meek	North Plains	Republican
Frank Mitchell	Baker	Republican
M. J. Murnane	Portland	Progressive Republican
B. F. Nichols	Riddle	Republican
J. H. Nolta	Portland	Progressive Republican
Conrad P. Olson	Portland	Republican
M. Vernon Parsons	Eugene	Republican
S. P. Peirce	Port Orford	Republican
F. H. Porter	Halsey	Republican
W. B. Potter	Spray	Republican
C. L. Reames	Medford	Democratic
Gustav Schnoerr	Willamette (Now part of West Linn)	Republican
Chris Schuebel	Oregon City	Republican
Wesley O. Smith	Klamath Falls	Republican
W. Irving Spencer	Portland	Progressive Republican
Robert N. Stanfield	Stanfield	Republican
C. H. Stranahan	Hood River	Republican
D. C. Thoms	Jefferson	Republican
Jay H. Upton	Portland	Republican
George W. Weeks	Salem	Republican
J. A. Westerlund	Medford	Republican
