= 28th Oregon Legislative Assembly =

←	27th Legislative Assembly	29th Legislative Assembly	→
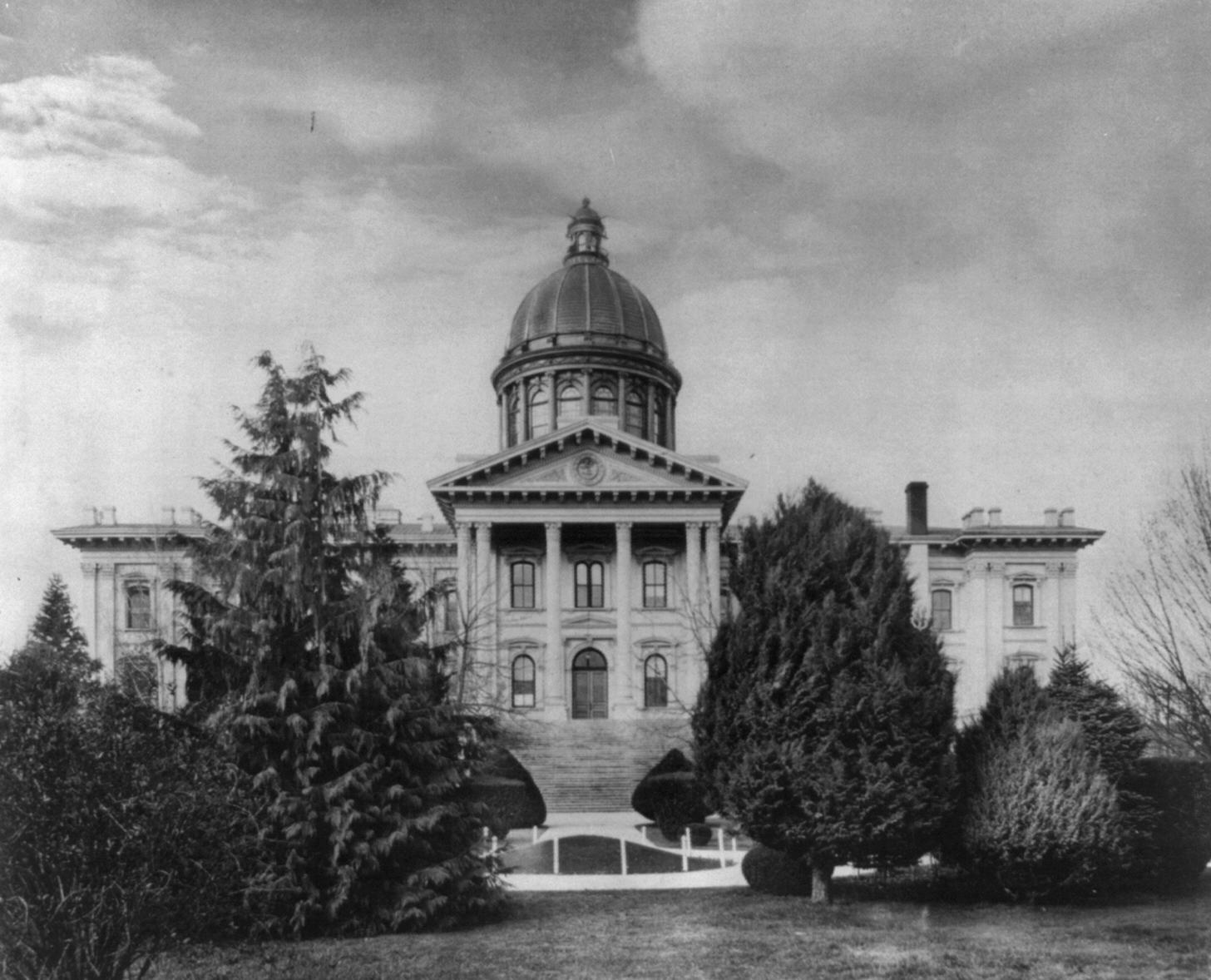
- The legislature took place in the second Oregon State Capitol, seen here in 1909

Overview
- Legislative body: Oregon Legislative Assembly
- Jurisdiction: Oregon, United States
- Meeting place: Oregon State Capitol
- Term: 1915
- Website: www.oregonlegislature.gov

Oregon State Senate
- Members: 30 Senators
- Senate President: W. Lair Thompson (R)
- Party control: Republican Party of Oregon

Oregon House of Representatives
- Members: 60 Representatives
- Speaker of the House: Ben Selling (R)
- Party control: Republican Party of Oregon

The 28th Oregon Legislative Assembly was the legislative session of the Oregon Legislative Assembly that convened on January 1, 1915 and adjourned February 20, 1915.

== Senate ==
Affiliation	Members
Democratic	2
Republican	28
Total	30

=== Senate members ===
Composition of the Senate
Senator	Residence	Party
C. A. Barrett	Athena	Republican
Isaac H. Bingham	Eugene	Republican
Charles Pleasant Bishop	Salem	Republican
J. N. Burgess	Pendleton	Republican
R. R. Butler	The Dalles	Republican
Kathryn Clarke	Roseburg	Republican
E. D. Cusick	Albany	Republican
I. N. Day	Portland	Republican
Walter A. Dimick	Oregon City	Republican
Robert S. Farrell	Portland	Republican
Samuel M. Garland	Lebanon	Democratic
C. L. Hawley	McCoy	Republican
W. H. Hollis	Forest Grove	Republican
Dan Kellaher	Portland	Republican
Edward E. Kiddle	Island City	Republican
A. M. LaFollett	Gervais	Republican
Arthur Langguth	Portland	Republican
C. A. Leinenweber	Astoria	Republican
George M. McBride	Portland	Republican
Gus C. Mozer	Portland	Republican
T. L. Perkins	Portland	Republican
W. H. Ragsdale	Moro	Republican
I. S. Smith	Marshfield	Republican
J. C. Smith	Grants Pass	Republican
Loring V. Stewart	Dayville	Republican
W. H. Strayer	Baker	Democratic
W. Lair Thompson	Lakeview	Republican
W. T. Vinton	McMinnville	Republican
H. Von der Hellen	Wellen	Republican
W. D. Wood	Hillsboro	Republican

== House ==
Affiliation	Members
Democratic	4
Republican	56
Total	60

=== House members ===
Composition of the House of Representatives
Representative	Residence	Party
Dana H. Allen	Salem	Republican
A. A. Anderson	Astoria	Republican
J. E. Anderson	The Dalles	Republican
Charles R. Barrow	Coquille	Republican
E. E. Blanchard	Grants Pass	Republican
Benton Bowman	Hillsboro	Republican
Sam H. Brown	Gervais	Republican
Thomas Brown	Salem	Republican
W. W. Cardwell	Roseburg	Republican
D. M. Cartmill	Haines	Republican
Charles Childs	Brownsville	Republican
Clay C. Clark	Arlington	Republican
S. B. Cobb	Portland	Republican
J. H. Collins	Ranier	Republican
Frank Davey	Burns	Republican
Walter B. Dillard	Eugene	Republican
Allen Eaton	Eugene	Republican
W. P. Elmore	Brownsville	Democratic
Melvin Fenwick	Springfield	Republican
Vernon A. Forbes	Bend	Republican
John Gill	Portland	Republican
W. T. Grier	Falls City	Republican
T. B. Handley	Tillamook	Republican
William G. Hare	Hillsboro	Republican
J. T. Hinkle	Hermiston	Republican
Oscar W. Horne	Portland	Republican
Guy T. Hunt	Garfield	Republican
C. M. Hurlburt	Portland	Republican
S. B. Huston	Portland	Republican
S. G. Irvin	Newport	Republican
James T. Jeffries	Astoria	Republican
W. Al Jones	Joseph	Republican
J. L. Kelly	The Dalles	Republican
Louis Kuehn	Portland	Republican
W. P. Lafferty	Corvallis	Republican
D. C. Lewis	St. Johns	Republican
E. C. Littlefield	Portland	Republican
Francis L. Michelbook	McMinnville	Republican
P. P. Olds	La Fayette	Republican
Conrad P. Olson	Portland	Republican
S. Paisley	Buxton	Republican
S. P. Peirce	Port Orford	Republican
D. H. Pierce	Harrisburg	Republican
Ora H. Porter	Roseburg	Republican
C. W. Risley	Milwaukie	Democratic
Roy W. Ritner	Pendleton	Republican
C. Schuebel	Oregon City	Republican
Ben Selling	Portland	Republican
Andrew C. Smith	Portland	Republican
Wesley O. Smith	Klamath Falls	Republican
Robert N. Stanfield	Stanfield	Republican
James S. Stewart	Fossil	Republican
Plowden Stott	Portland	Republican
D. C. Thoms	Jefferson	Republican
Marian B. Towne	Phoenix	Democratic
William I. Vawter	Medford	Republican
Fred D. Wagner	Ashland	Republican
George W. Weeks	Salem	Republican
Lloyd J. Wentworth	Portland	Republican
James D. Woodell	La Grande	Democratic
