= Vernon Forbes =

Vernon Forbes may refer to:

- Vernon A. Forbes (1883–1918), American attorney and politician
- Vernon D. Forbes (1905–1990), justice of the Alaska Territorial District Court
- Jake Forbes (ice hockey) (born Vernor Vivian Forbes; 1897–1985), Canadian ice hockey player
