= Hazen A. Brattain =

American rancher, banker, and politician (1864–1930)

- Rancher and legislator H. A. Brattain

Member of the Oregon House of Representatives from the 21st district
- In office 1909–1910
- Preceded by: George H. Merryman
- Succeeded by: W. Lair Thompson

Personal details
- Born: September 2, 1864 Springfield, Oregon
- Died: September 21, 1930 (aged 66) Paisley, Oregon
- Party: Republican
- Profession: Rancher and banker

Hazen Adelbert Brattain (also known as H. A. Brattain; September 2, 1864 – September 21, 1930) was an American rancher, banker, and a state legislator from the state of Oregon. He served one term in the Oregon House of Representatives as a Republican legislator, representing a large and rural district in central and southern Oregon. He also was president of the First National Bank of Lakeview and operated a large cattle ranch in Lake County, Oregon.

== Early life ==
Brattain was born in Springfield, Oregon, on September 2, 1864, the son of Thomas Jefferson Brattain and Permelia Jane (Gillespie) Brattain. He was the third of four children. At the time of his birth, Brattain's father had a 300 acres (120 ha) farm in Linn County east of the Springfield town site. In 1869, his family moved to the Langell Valley in what is now Klamath County in southern Oregon. In 1873, the Brattain family moved east to the Chewaucan River valley, locating south of Paisley, Oregon. His father established a successful cattle ranch there. Brattain's father helped build the area's first school and later served on the Paisley school board.

Brattain attended college in Eugene, Oregon, receiving a Bachelor of Arts degree from the University of Oregon in 1888. He then went on to earn Master of Arts from the university in 1893.

When he finished his education, Brattain returned to Lake County where he helped run his family’s ranch. After his father’s death, Brattain entered into a partnership with his younger brother, Paul J. Brattain, to continue operating the family ranch. In addition to the ranch, Brattain had other business interests in Lake County. He was a director and then vice president of two local banking institutions, the First National Bank of Lakeview and the Lake County Loan and Savings Bank.

== Political career ==
The Brattain family actively supported the Republican Party and its candidates. In 1896, Brattain joined his father on the Lake County Republican central committee, representing the Chewaucan/Paisley area.

In 1908, the Lake County Examiner began encouraging Brattain to run for a District 21 seat in the Oregon House of Representatives. The newspaper recommended Brattain because of his experience as a prosperous livestock rancher and successful banker. Shortly after the Examiner began promoting Brattain for a seat in the state legislature, several other central Oregon newspapers picked up Brattain’s cause. They not only citing Brattain’s success in business, but his understanding of key issues relevant to citizens living in District 21 as reason for supporting him. They also highlighted his college education and personal popularity across the district. As a result, Brattain, decided to run for a seat in the Oregon legislature. In the Republican primary, Brattain and Horace P. Belknap were nominated for the two District 21 positions and then went on to win the two District 21 seats in the general election.

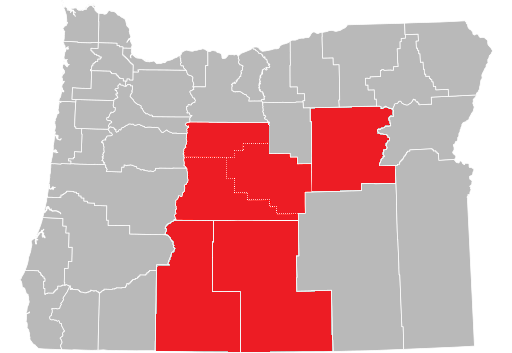
Oregon House District 21, 1909

Brattain took his seat in the Oregon legislative assembly when the 25th regular session was called to order on 11 January 1909. As a District 21 legislator, he represented a very large and rural district that included Crook, Grant, Klamath, and Lake counties. At that time, what are now Deschutes and Jefferson counties were part of Crook County. Together these counties covered over one-quarter of the land area of Oregon. During the session, he served on the banking, assessment and taxation, and alcoholic traffic committees. The 1909 session lasted six weeks, ending on 20 February. A month later, Brattain and his fellow legislators were called back to the capitol for a two-day special session before adjourning for the remainder of the biennium.

After the state legislature finished its session, Brattain continued to serve in various appointed positions. Governor Frank W. Benson named Brattain as a delegate to the 1909 National Irrigation Congress in Spokane, Washington. A year later, Governor Jay Bowerman names him as delegate to the 1910 National Irrigation Congress, held in Pueblo, Colorado. Brattain decided not to run for re-election and left office when his two-year term finished at the end of 1910.

In 1920, after being out of the state legislature for a decade, Brattain once again ran for a District 21 seat in the Oregon House of Representatives. Two other Republicans, Denton G. Burdick and Harley J. Overturf, also file for the two District 21 seats. Despite the competition, Brattain did not actively campaign for the position. As a result, he lost the Republican primary to Burdick and Overturf, who went on to win the two District 21 seats in the general election.

== Later life ==
After leaving state politics, Brattain continued to manage his family ranch near Paisley. He also retained his bank positions, eventually becoming president of the First National Bank of Lakeview. In addition, he served on the Oregon Cattle and Horse Raisers Association’s executive board. The Lake County Examiner also raised Brattain’s name as a possible candidate for Lake County commissioner, but he decided not to run for that position.

After the Nevada–California–Oregon Railway reached Lakeview, Brattain and other Lake County leaders actively engaged in an effort to persuade the railroad to extend its tracks north to Paisley. However, that effort proved unsuccessful. In 1922, Brattain joined two partners to found the Chewaucan Private Electric Company to provide commercial electricity to the Paisley community.

In 1930, Brattain took a seven month tour around the world. During his travels, Brattain crossed the Pacific Ocean, visiting Hawaii, Japan, Korea, China, Philippines, and Singapore. He then crossed the Indian Ocean, stopping at India and Ceylon before reaching the Suez Canal. He visited a number of sites in Egypt and the Holy Lands. Brattain then visited countries across Europe including Italy, France, Germany, England, Scotland, Wales, and Ireland before crossing the Atlantic Ocean to New York City. From New York, he drove across the United States to Los Angeles and then back to his home in Oregon.

Brattain never married. He died on September 21, 1930, at his ranch near Paisley, just a month after returning from his around the world trip. He was 66 years old at the time of his death. He is buried at the Odd Fellows cemetery in Paisley.
