= Horace P. Belknap =

American politician

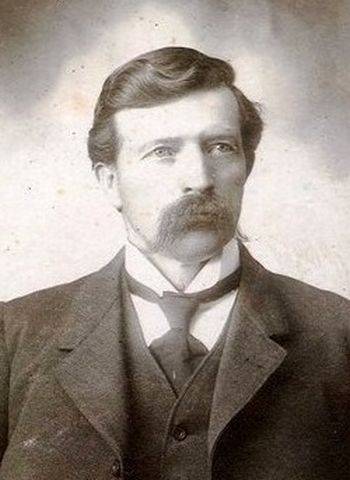
- Doctor Horace P. Belknap, 1905

Member of the Oregon House of Representatives from the 21st district
- In office 1907–1912
- Preceded by: John S. Shook
- Succeeded by: Vernon A. Forbes

Personal details
- Born: April 5, 1856 Monroe, Oregon Territory (now Oregon)
- Died: May 18, 1936 (aged 80) Prineville, Oregon
- Party: Republican
- Spouse: Alwilda Randolph Ketchum (m. 1888)
- Profession: Physician

Horace Preston Belknap (also known as H. P. Belknap; April 5, 1856 – May 18, 1936) was an American pioneer medical doctor, businessman, and a state legislator from the state of Oregon. Belknap was one of the first physicians to establish a medical practice in Central Oregon. He also served three terms in the Oregon House of Representatives as a Republican legislator, representing a large and rural district in central and southern Oregon.

== Early life ==
Belknap was born in Monroe, Oregon Territory, on April 5, 1856, the son of Harley Augustus and Thirza Ann (Inman) Belknap. He attended grade school in Benton County, Oregon. In 1875, his family moved from the Willamette Valley to Wasco County, east of the Cascade Mountains. They settled in an area that later became Crook County, where his father established a cattle ranch.

Belknap attended college at Willamette University in Salem, Oregon. He then went on to study medicine at University of Michigan in Ann Arbor for two years before finishing his medical training at Bellevue Hospital in New York City, where he received his medical degree with honors in 1886.

After finishing his medical training, Belknap returned to Crook County, Oregon where he began his medical practice in Prineville. When he began his practice in 1886, he was one of the area's first doctors. Belknap married Alwilda Randolph Ketchum (known as "Wilda") on 14 March 1888. Together they had four sons, Horace Preston Jr., (29 January 1890), Wilford Hall (21 September 1892), Leland Ves, (2 October 1894), and Hobart Dean (19 October 1896). All of their sons went on to become physicians and surgeons.

In Prineville, Belknap became actively involved in professional, business, and community affairs. He was a member of the American Medical Association and the Oregon State Medical Society. He was also a co-founder of the Crook County Medical Association. He owned a mining company in neighboring Grant County along with a very productive sawmill in the same area. In addition, Belknap was an active member of the Masons and the local Odd Fellows lodge.

== Political career ==
Belknap began his political career serving in local offices in Crook County. Shortly after arriving in Prineville, he ran for the county superintendent of schools position, but lost the election. He ran again for that position in 1892 and won. He served as county superintendent of schools for two years before being elected county treasurer in 1894. He was then elected mayor of Prineville and served in that position for three years, ending in 1896.

Belknap, a Republican, entered state politics in 1896 when he was selected as a Crook County delegate to Oregon's state Republican convention. Over the next decade, he continued to support the Republican Party and its candidates, attending both county and state conventions.

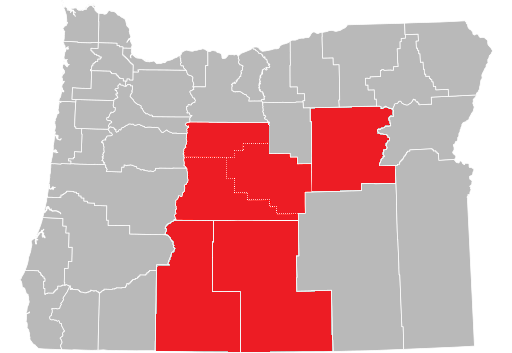
Oregon House District 21, 1907

In 1906, Belknap ran for a District 21 seat in the Oregon House of Representatives as a Republican. In the Republican primary, Belknap and George H. Merryman (another physician) were nominated for the two District 21 seats. Since no Democrats filed for nomination, both Belknap and Merryman were unopposed in the general election. Belknap took his seat in the Oregon Legislative Assembly when the 24th regular session was called to order on January 14, 1907. As a District 21 delegate, he represented a very large and rural district that included Crook (which then included what is now Deschutes and Jefferson counties), Grant, Klamath, and Lake counties. Together these counties covered over one-quarter of the land area of Oregon. During the session, he served on the medicine and pharmacy committee as well as the irrigation committee. The session ended on February 23.

In 1908, Belknap again ran for a District 21 seat. Belknap and Hazen A. Brattain won the Republican primary and then went on to win the two District 21 seats in the general election. His election allowed him to attend the regular legislative sessions in 1909. During the 1909 session, which began on January 11, Belknap served on the elections, medicine and pharmacy, and public lands committees. The 1909 session lasted six weeks, ending on February 20. A month later, Belknap and his fellow legislators were called back for a two-day special session before adjourning for the remainder of the biennium. Following the close of the special session, Governor Frank W. Benson appointed Belknap as a delegate to Oregon's Good Roads Convention which meet during the summer of 1909.

In 1910, Belknap ran for a third term in the Oregon House of Representatives. The state Republican convention endorsed Belknap and W. Lair Thompson for the two District 21 representative seats. In the general election, Belknap and Thompson won the district's two seats, easily defeating the only Democrat in the race. The 1911 legislative session began on January 9 and lasted through February 18. During that session, Belknap was appointed to the education, elections, and medicine and pharmacy committees. Near the end of his two-year term, Belknap announced he would not run for a fourth term due to poor health.

== Later life ==
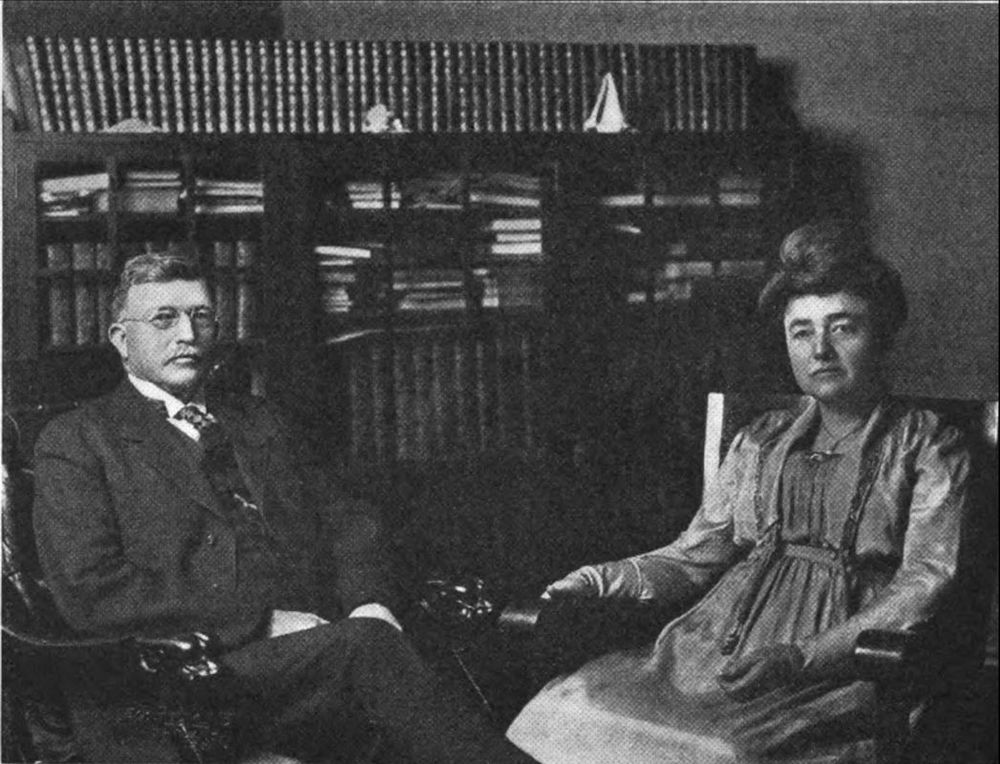
Horace and Wilda Belknap, 1922

After finishing his third term in the House, Belknap returned to his medical practice in Prineville. He remained active in this practice for the rest of his life. During World War I, Belknap served as the physician on Crook County's exemption board that reviewed and approved military service exemptions. After the war, one of his sons joined him as a partner in his Prineville medical practice. By 1932, Belknap had been practicing medicine longer than any other physician in central Oregon.

Belknap died of a stroke on May 18, 1936, at his home in Prineville at the age of 80. He was survived by his wife and their four sons. Belknap's funeral service was held at the Prineville Community Church on May 20, 1936. On the day of the funeral, National Guard inductions were suspended in central Oregon because all of the local medical examiners were attending Belknap's funeral.
