= Reid School (Bend, Oregon) =

- U.S. National Register of Historic Places
- U.S. Historic district – Contributing property
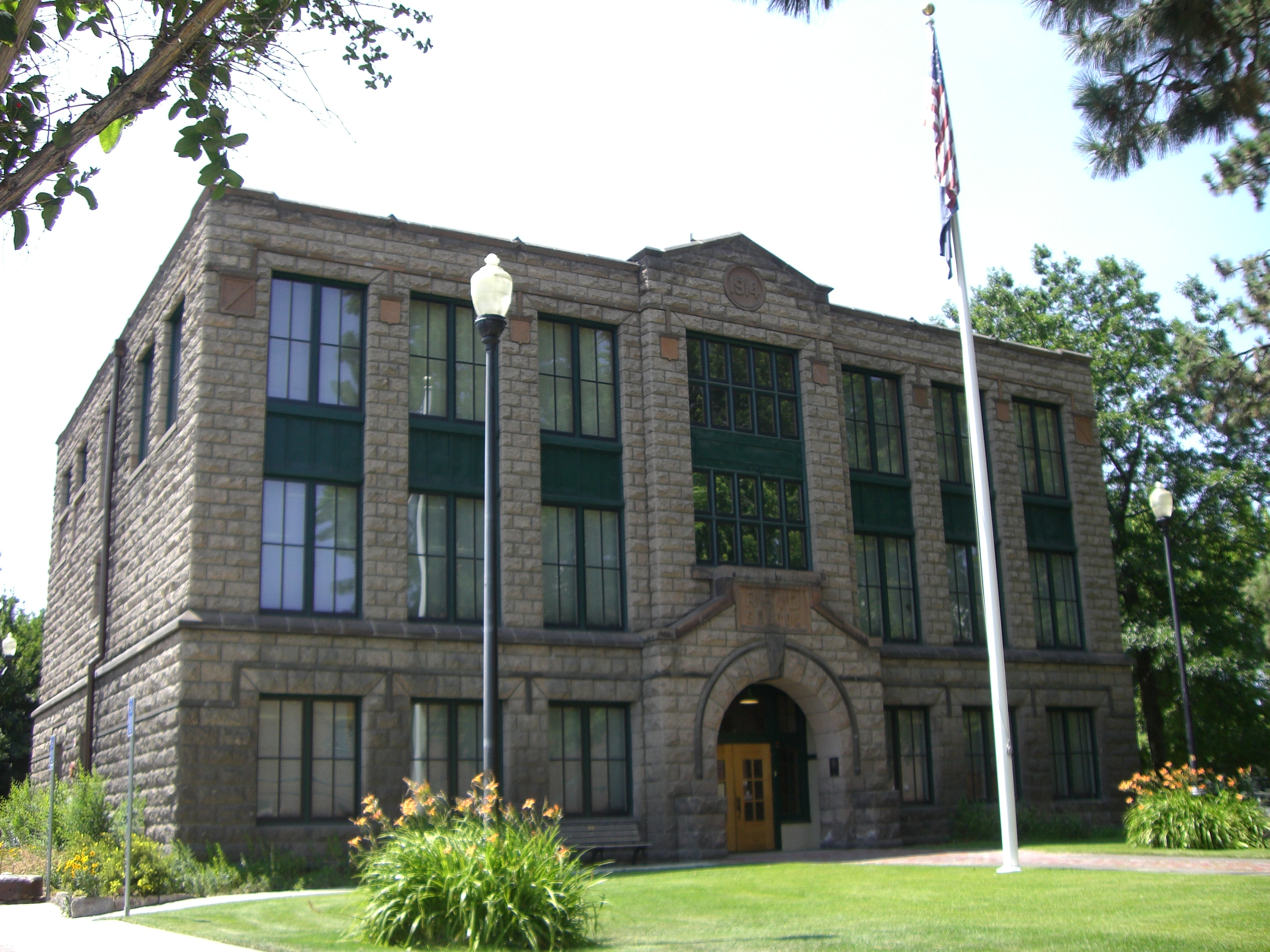
- Reid School in 2008, as the Deschutes Historical Museum.
- Location: 460 NW Wall Street; Bend, Oregon
- Coordinates: 44°03′19″N 121°19′02″W
- Built: 1914
- Architect: Sweatt, Levesque and Company
- Architectural style: Richardsonian Romanesque
- Part of: Old Town Historic District (ID01000681)
- NRHP reference No.: 79002053
- Added to NRHP: 1979

The Reid School is a historic school building in Bend, Oregon, United States. Built in 1914, it was the first modern school building constructed in Bend. The school was named in honor of Ruth Reid, Bend's first school principal. The building remained part of the public school district until 1979, when ownership was transferred to Deschutes County for use as a local history museum. Today, the Reid School is the home of the Deschutes Historical Museum. Because of its unique architecture and importance to the history of Bend, the Reid School is listed on the National Register of Historic Places.

== History ==
Bend's first schoolhouse was opened in 1887. It was located in an abandoned cabin near the Deschutes River in what is now Drake Park. That schoolhouse was replaced in 1904 by a three-story wood-frame school building located at the north end of Bend's downtown area, near where the Deschutes County Court House is located today. Ruth Reid became the first principal of the 1904 school.

In 1913, the people of Bend passed a school bond issue that provided $23,000 for the purchase of property and the construction of a modern public school. The school district purchased several downtown lots on the corner of Wall Street and Idaho Avenue from The Bend Company, and one adjacent lot from a local family, to create a 1.9-acre (7,700 m^{2}) building site.

A three-story school was built on the site in 1914. The new school accommodated students from first grade through high school. It was named in honor of Ruth Reid, and she continued as principal in the new school, overseeing 241 students. Because the Great Northern and Union Pacific railroads had opened routes into Central Oregon in 1911, the community was growing rapidly. As a result, 42 of the 241 children who attended the Reid School in 1914 were new students. The Reid School continued to serve as an important part of Bend's public school system for the next 65 years. During that time, Bend grew from fewer than 1,000 citizens to more than 16,000.

In 1979, ownership of the school building was transferred from the Bend School District to Deschutes County. The county in turn, agreed to lease the building to the Deschutes County Historical Society for use as a local history museum. The historical society raised money to renovate the Reid School, and then filled the new museum with exhibits from the society's collection of artifacts gathered from around Central Oregon. Oregon Governor Victor Atiyeh dedicated the Des Chutes Historical Center on July 4, 1980.

In 2002, exterior windows were replaced, an elevator was installed, and the building's heating and cooling systems were upgraded to create a modern museum facility. Today, the center has exhibits on pioneer life, logging, forestry, transportation, education, and Native American culture. Its history library is open to the public and a small bookstore features works on Central Oregon history.

Because of the school's unique architecture and its importance to the history of Bend, the Reid School was listed on the National Register of Historic Places in 1979.

== Structure ==
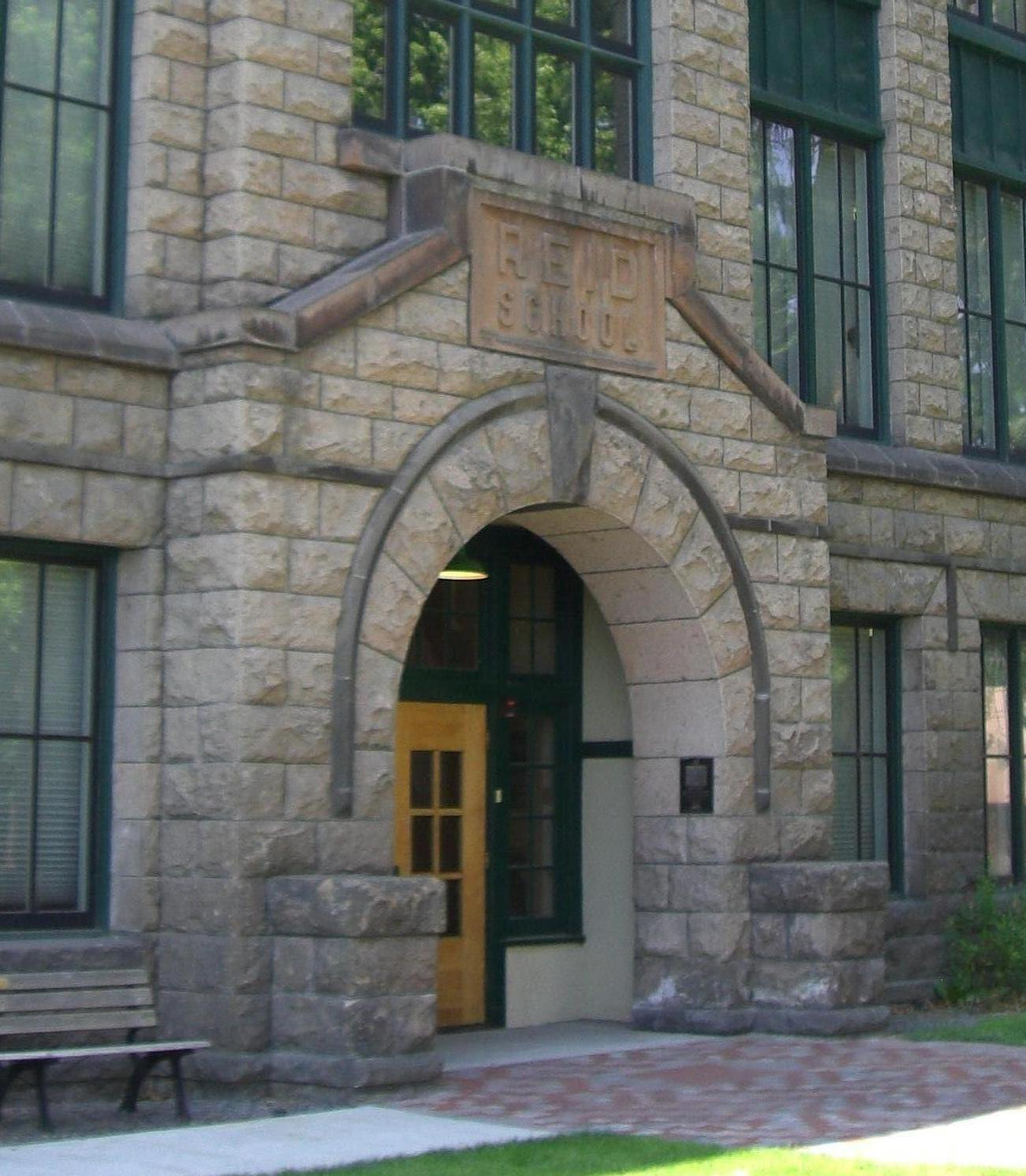
The Reid School's imposing front entrance

The Reid School is a classic Richardsonian Romanesque building designed by Sweatt, Levesque and Company, an architecture firm from Spokane, Washington. Ed and George Brosterhous were the general contractors who supervised the school's construction. The school was built in the center of a 1.9-acre (7,700 m^{2}) parcel in downtown Bend, facing Idaho Avenue. It is surrounded by lawn with concrete walkways leading to the front door. There are a number of large Ponderosa pine trees that shade the grounds, giving the area a park-like atmosphere.

The school is a three-story rectangular structure, with a footprint measuring 52 feet (16 m) by 60 feet (18 m). The building rests on a concrete foundation. The structure itself was constructed of locally quarried pink volcanic tuff. However, the original pinkish color has weathered to a light brown. The central feature of the building's facade is its entryway. The imposing double-leaf doors are recessed from the front wall in a shallow vestibule. The entry is flanked on the first floor by three classroom windows on each side. The second and third story facade is dominated by tall windows with fixed panes. The roof is covered with built-up asphalt.

The Reid School was built as a modern education facility with ten classrooms, an auditorium, a central heating system, built-in electric clocks, drinking fountains, indoor plumbing, and an external fire escape system. The interior of the school is characterized by high ceilings, steep stairways, and large high-bay windows that provide natural light to the classrooms. The interior walls are lath and plaster, and are still in good condition. The original doors, moldings, and window casings are also in good condition. The original plumbing fixtures are still in use. The original boiler heating system is intact, but is no longer used.

== Ruth Reid Overturf ==
Reid School's namesake, Ruth Reid, was born in New Brunswick, Canada. She came to Bend in 1904 to teach school. Besides becoming Bend's first school principal, she helped found the city's high school in 1908.

In 1910, Miss Reid married Harley J. Overturf, the office manager for the Drake Development Company. In 1916, the couple built a two-story American Craftsman-style home near the Deschutes River in what is now the Drake Park Neighborhood Historic District. The Overturfs remained in Bend until 1953, when they moved to Hood River, Oregon. Ruth Reid Overturf died in 1965.
