= Daniel J. Malarkey =

American attorney and politician

- Malarkey in 1913

21st President of the Oregon State Senate
- In office 1913 – 1914
- Preceded by: Ben Selling
- Succeeded by: W. Lair Thompson

Member of the Oregon Senate from the 18th /14th district
- In office 1905 – 1908; 1911 – 1914
- Constituency: Multnomah County; then Multnomah and Clackamas counties

Member of the Oregon House of Representatives from the 18th district
- In office 1903 – 1904

Personal details
- Born: July 15, 1870 New York City, US
- Died: December 1, 1939 (aged 69) Portland, Oregon, US
- Party: Republican
- Spouse: Annie Laurie Burgess
- Profession: Attorney

Daniel James Malarkey (15 July 1870 – 1 December 1939), known as Dan Malarkey, was an attorney and politician from the state of Oregon. He served one two-year term in the Oregon House of Representatives followed by two non-consecutive four-year terms in the Oregon State Senate. Malarkey was a moderate Republican who represented Multnomah County in both chambers. He served as President of the Oregon Senate during the 1913 legislative session. Malarkey was known as a champion of progressive legislation including sponsoring Oregon’s first public utilities law and the state’s first minimum wage law that covered women. He was also one of the state’s most prominent attorneys for over 40 years. Malarkey actively opposed the influence of the Ku Klux Klan in Oregon. His legal efforts were successful in having a Klan-sponsored education bill declared unconstitutional, a decision that was ultimately upheld by the United States Supreme Court.

== Early life ==
Malarkey was born on 15 July 1870 in New York City. He was the son of Charles M. Malarkey and Katherine (O'Neil) Malarkey. He was one of nine children in the Malarkey family. In 1873, at the age of three, he moved with his family to Oregon. The family settled in Portland, where his father owned a fish and poultry business for many years before founding a successful real estate firm. His father also served as the Multnomah County treasurer. His father's community service helped the young Malarkey develop an interest in public affairs.

Malarkey got his early education at St. Michael's College, a private catholic school in Portland. He then attended Portland High School, where he graduated in 1885 at the age of 14. After graduating from high school, he studied law with a Portland judge before entering law school at the University of Oregon. He graduated at the top of his class in 1892 and was admitted to the Oregon State Bar later that year.

On 26 June 1893, Malarkey married Annie Laurie Burgess. Together they had four children. Eventually, they built a large family home on Hillcrest Place in the Portland Heights neighborhood.

== Professional and civic affairs ==
While Malarkey began his law career working on petty criminal cases in local police courts, his legal skills were quickly noticed. In 1893, he was appointed deputy district attorney for Multnomah County, a position he held for two terms until 1898. In 1899, he became a partner in the law firm of Gammans and Malarkey. He remained with that firm until 1910. During that period, he became a member of several bar associations.

In the early 1890s, Malarkey began investing in local business projects. In 1891, he joined two partners to incorporate the Oneonta Land Company with $400K in capital stock. The firm was engaged in the real estate business in and around Portland. A year later, joined two other partners to incorporated the Portland University Land Company with $40K in capital stock. It was also a real estate business. Later, Malarkey and two partners incorporated the Universal Sash and Door Company with $15K in capital. The company manufactured and sold lumber, doors, sashes, and blinds to customers in the Portland area.

Malarkey was also active in civic and church groups. He joined Portland’s Commercial Club and the Portland Heights Club. Malarkey was a member of the Catholic Order of Foresters, serving as that organization’s first Chief Ranger of Oregon. He was also a delegate to the order’s international convention. In addition, he was a member of the Knights of Columbus and an active leader in his Catholic parish.

As a young professional man, Malarkey became a popular public speaker. This helped him meet people throughout the local area, especially fellow Republicans who dominated political affairs in Portland and Multnomah County at that time. In 1896, he was asked to serve as secretary for the Portland city and Multnomah County Republican convention, where Republican candidates for state and local offices were selected. This was a good introduction to local politics.

== State representative ==
In 1902, Malarkey decided to run for the Oregon House of Representatives. At the Multnomah County Republican convention, his fellow Republicans nominated him as a candidate for state representative. He was one of 12 Republican candidates nominated to compete for Multnomah County’s 12 House seats.

The general election field included 26 candidates: 12 Republicans, 12 Citizens Party candidates, and 2 socialists. Malarkey was among 12 individuals (all Republicans) elected to Oregon House of Representatives from Multnomah County. Malarkey got 1,114 votes, finishing tenth out of 26 candidates. The top vote-getter in the election received 1,271 votes while the last successful candidate (the 12th place candidate) got 1,059 votes. Votes for the losing candidates ranged from 981 down to 150.

After his election, Malarkey took his District 18 seat in the Oregon House of Representatives. The 1903 regular legislative session opened on 12 January. During the session, Malarkey served as chairman of the House public library committee. He was also appointed to the military affairs and mining committees. The session was adjourned on 20 February. There were no special sessions called during the remainder of his two-year term which expired at the end of 1904.

== State senator ==
In 1904, Malarkey decided to compete for a state senate seat representing Multnomah County. At the Multnomah County Republican nominating convention there was a major fight between supporters of United States Senator John H. Mitchell and followers of state senator Joseph Simon. The Mitchell delegates controlled the convention and therefore the nominations. Even though Malarkey was a Mitchell supporter, he was initially left off the list of Republican candidates for state senate. This was because as a House member, he had been an independent voice who did not always follow the guidance of party leaders. Nevertheless, Malarkey had many friends in both the Mitchell and Simon factions who supported his candidacy. Together, they voted to override party leaders and nominated Malarkey as a state senate candidate.

In the general election, Malarkey won a seat in the state senate, representing Multnomah County’s District 18. He took his senate seat in the 1905 regular session on 9 January. During the session, Malarkey was appointed chairman of the revision of laws committee. He also served on the judiciary, military affairs, and penal institutions committees. The session lasted a little over five weeks, adjourning on 17 February.

Because state senators in Oregon are elected to four-year terms, Malarkey did not have to run for re-election in 1906. The 1907 session began on 14 February. During the session Malarkey served as chairman of the judiciary committee. He was also appointed to the assessment and taxation, irrigation, and revision of laws committees. The legislature finished its business and adjourned on 23 February.

In 1908, Oregon was transitioning from a party convention nominating process to a party primary election process. As that transition began, the Multnomah Republican Party fielded over 50 candidates for legislative seats supported by at least four party factions, each supporting their own slate of candidates. At least one of the factions encouraged Malarkey to run for re-election to the state senate. However, he decided not to run again, but pledged to support the Republican nominees selected by voters in the primary. Ultimately, there were 16 Republicans running for 5 Multnomah County senate seats, but Malarkey was not among them. Instead, he decided to seek appointment to the United States District Attorney position. He did not get the position, perhaps because of the publicity he received for successfully defending state senator George C. Brownell in the Oregon land fraud scandal case. Malarkey proved in court that Brownell’s name had been forged on the incriminating document, which clearly established his innocence.

After leaving the state senate, Malarkey went back to his successful law practice in Portland. However, by 1910, the Republican Party machine that previously controlled the convention nominating process and still had great influence in the Oregon legislature, was pushing to abandon primaries and return to selecting party candidates at local and state conventions. Malarkey was a strong supporter of the primary system. As such, he traveled throughout the state speaking on behalf of voters determining party candidates.

In July 1910, Malarkey announces he would run for state senate representing both Multnomah and Clackamas counties. Once again, he was opposed by Republican Party leaders. The Republican machine nominated Louis J. Clark to run for the state senate against Malarkey. However, shortly before the primary, Clarke dropped out of the race for the joint-county senate seat. Malarkey won the Republican primary, beating the remaining candidate, Emmet Drake, by a vote of 10,771 to 6,064. He also won the Democratic primary with write-in votes, leaving him unopposed in the general election.

When the 1911 legislative session opened on 9 January, Malarkey took his District 14 senate seat jointly representing Multnomah and Clackamas counties. When the session was organized, Malarkey nominated senator Ben Selling for senate president. Selling was elected, receiving support from 17 of the chamber’s 30 senators. Selling made Malarkey chairman of the judiciary committee. Selling also appointed Malarkey to the enrolled bills, penial institutions, public lands, and railroads committees. The 1911 legislative session was adjourned on 18 February.

== Senate president ==
Once again, Malarkey’s four-year senate term allowed him to continue serving in the senate without running for re-election in 1912. This gave him time to lobby fellow senators for their support in his effort to become senate president. After the general election, he quickly got support commitments from 24 of the chambers 30 senators, guaranteeing his election as senate president.

The 1913 legislative session opened on 13 January. When the session was organized, Malarkey was elected senate president with 25 of 30 senators voting for him. During the election process, two fellow Republicans (George W. Joseph and Daniel Kellaher) voiced opposition to Malarkey’s candidacy. Both claimed Malarkey had secured support from colleagues by promising specific committee assignments in exchange for votes. Malarkey denied the accusation, but acknowledged that once he had 25 pledged votes, he had begun organizing senate committees. He said his goal was to match senators with committees that would be most useful during the session. Joseph and Kellaher tried to nominate several other senators for senate president, but everyone they approached declined, saying they supported Malarkey. Despite their opposition to his election, Malarkey gave both Joseph and Kellaher important committee chairmanships.

Once he was elected president, Malarkey put the senate to work, sending 20 bills to senate committees on the first day of the session. From that running start, he kept the senate focused on its business throughout the session. As senate leader, Malarkey was a champion of progressive reforms. Under his direction, the legislature passed Oregon’s first minimum wage law, creating an Industrial Welfare Commission charged with setting a minimum wage and regulating working hours for women and minors. Malarkey was also the author of the state’s first comprehensive law regulating public utilities. At least one newspaper reported that Malarkey was positioning himself to run for the United States Senate in 1914 against incumbent Democrat George E. Chamberlain.

To hold up legislation passed by the Republican controlled legislature, Democratic governor Oswald West locked his office in the capitol and left Salem so the bills could not be delivered for executive review. Delivery would have begun a five-day window during which the governor would have to sign or veto the bills. Since both the Senate and House had enough Republicans to override his veto, the bills were sure to become law. To get around the governor’s vacancy strategy, Malarkey and the senate’s chief clerk opened a hall window next to the governor’s office and crawled along an outside ledge on the capitol façade to enter an unsecured window in the governor’s office. Once inside, they deposited 30 bills on the governor’s desk, thus starting the five-day review period. If the governor did not sign or veto the bills within five days the bills would automatically become law.

Prior to closing the session, Malarkey released a list of senate appointments to fill interim study committees that would report recommendations to the next session of the legislature. At the end of the session, senators lauded Malarkey for fair and impartial leadership. The senate unanimously passed a resolution thanking Malarkey for his "able, efficient, fair, and impartial leadership." The 1913 legislative session was adjourned on 5 March.

== Later life ==
After the legislative session closed, Malarkey remained a member of the state senate until his four-year term was finished at the end of 1914. While he could have run for re-election to the state senate, he was also considered a leading candidate to oppose Oregon’s Democratic United States senator, George Chamberlain, in the 1914 election. Instead, he surprised everyone by announcing that he would not seek public office in 1914. The decision was made at the urging of his wife, who was concerned that continuing in public office might negatively impact on their family.

Malarkey was one of Portland's leading trial lawyers. He was well-known and respected throughout the Pacific Northwest, both as a legal scholar and a skillful courtroom attorney. During his time in the legislature, Malarkey had maintained his law practice in Portland; first, with Gammans and Malarkey and then with the firm of Malarkey, Seabrook and Stott. He later became a partner in Malarkey, Sabin and Dibble which eventually evolved into Malarkey, Sabin and Hebring. After leaving public office, Malarkey continued to practice law for the next 25 years. In 1913, he was admitted to practice law before the United States Supreme Court. He was nominated for that honor by his old rival, Senator George Chamberlain.

During World War I, Malarkey actively supported America’s war effort. In 1917, as the United States was on the threshold entering the war, the president of Reed College, William Trufant Foster, invited former Stanford University president David Starr Jordan to speak at the college. Jordan was traveling across America speaking in opposition to the war. That same afternoon on the other side of Portland, Malarkey spoke to a group Naval Reserve lawyers, denouncing Foster and Jordan as "peace-at-any-price" traitors. During World War I, Malarkey was a member of the local Draft Board’s Appellate and Review Tribunal.

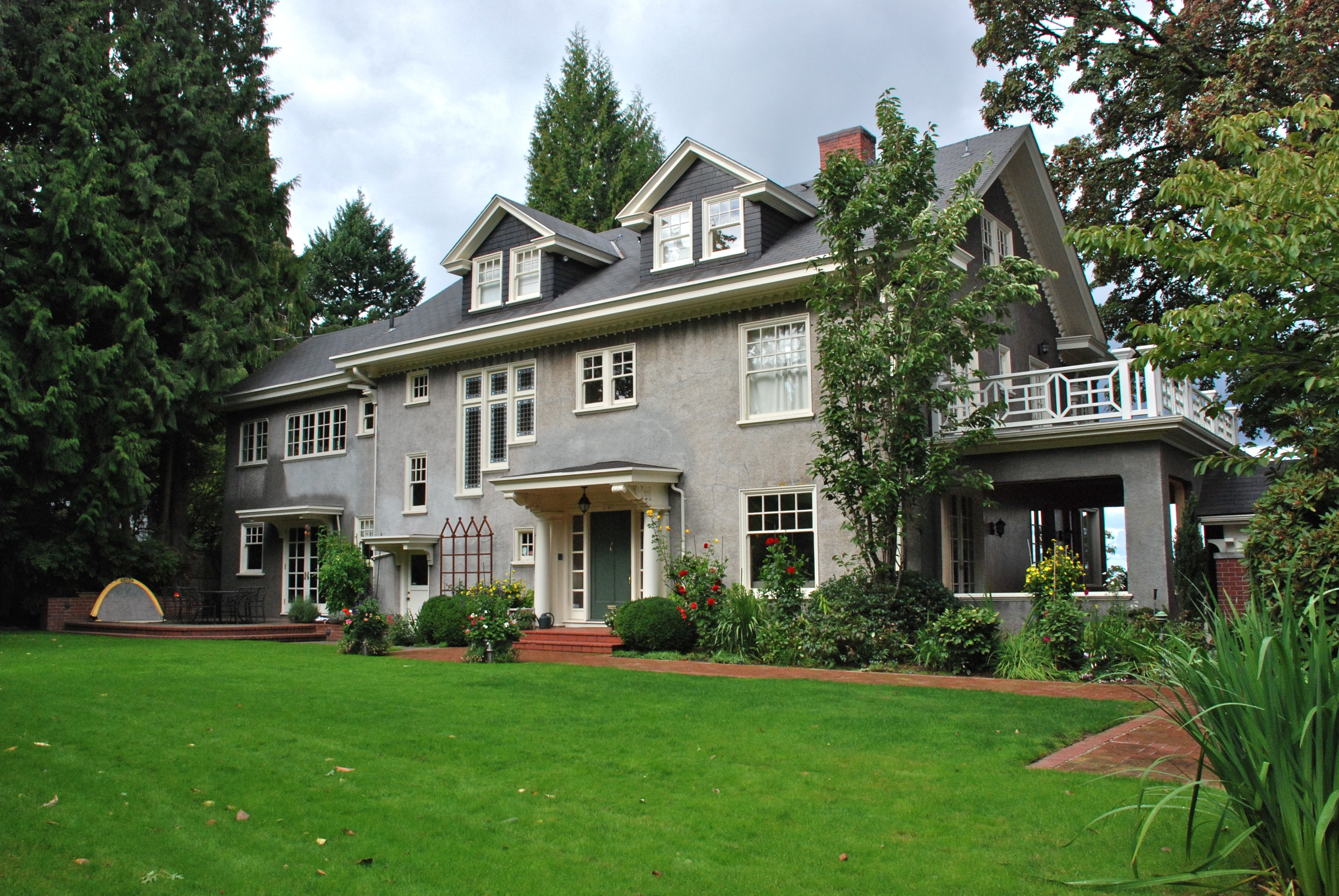
Daniel Malarkey house in southwest Portland

Malarkey was involved in a number of well publicized cases. For example, voters approved the Oregon Compulsory Education Act in 1922, a bill actively supported by the Ku Klux Klan. The law required Oregon schools to teach "pure Americanism" in classrooms throughout the state. Malarkey represented religious and private schools seeking to kill the legislation. He was successful in having the law declared unconstitutional in United States district court. In 1925, the decision was upheld in the United States Supreme Court. The case is known as Pierce v. Society of Sisters.

Malarkey died at his home in Portland on 1 December 1939 after a month-long illness. His funeral was held at St Mary’s Cathedral in Portland on 4 December. His funeral was attended by a large crowd of people from all walks of life along with many notable individuals including all seven justices of the Oregon Supreme Court. He was buried at Portland’s Mount Calvary Cemetery.

Malarkey was survived by his wife and all four of their children. He left most of his estate to his widow, including over $10,000 in various bank accounts plus property valued between $75,000 and $100,000, for a total of at least $85,000 (equivalent to $1,967,000 in 2025).

Today, the Daniel J. Malarkey House on Hillcrest Place in Portland is listed on the National Register of Historic Places. The residence was designed by Portland architect Joseph Jacobberger. The house was built in 1909 in the Arts and Crafts style. It has a rough stucco exterior with a decorative entry portico and a large stained-glass window in the front. The Malarkey house was added to the National Register in 1993.
