= Harley J. Overturf =

American politician and businessman

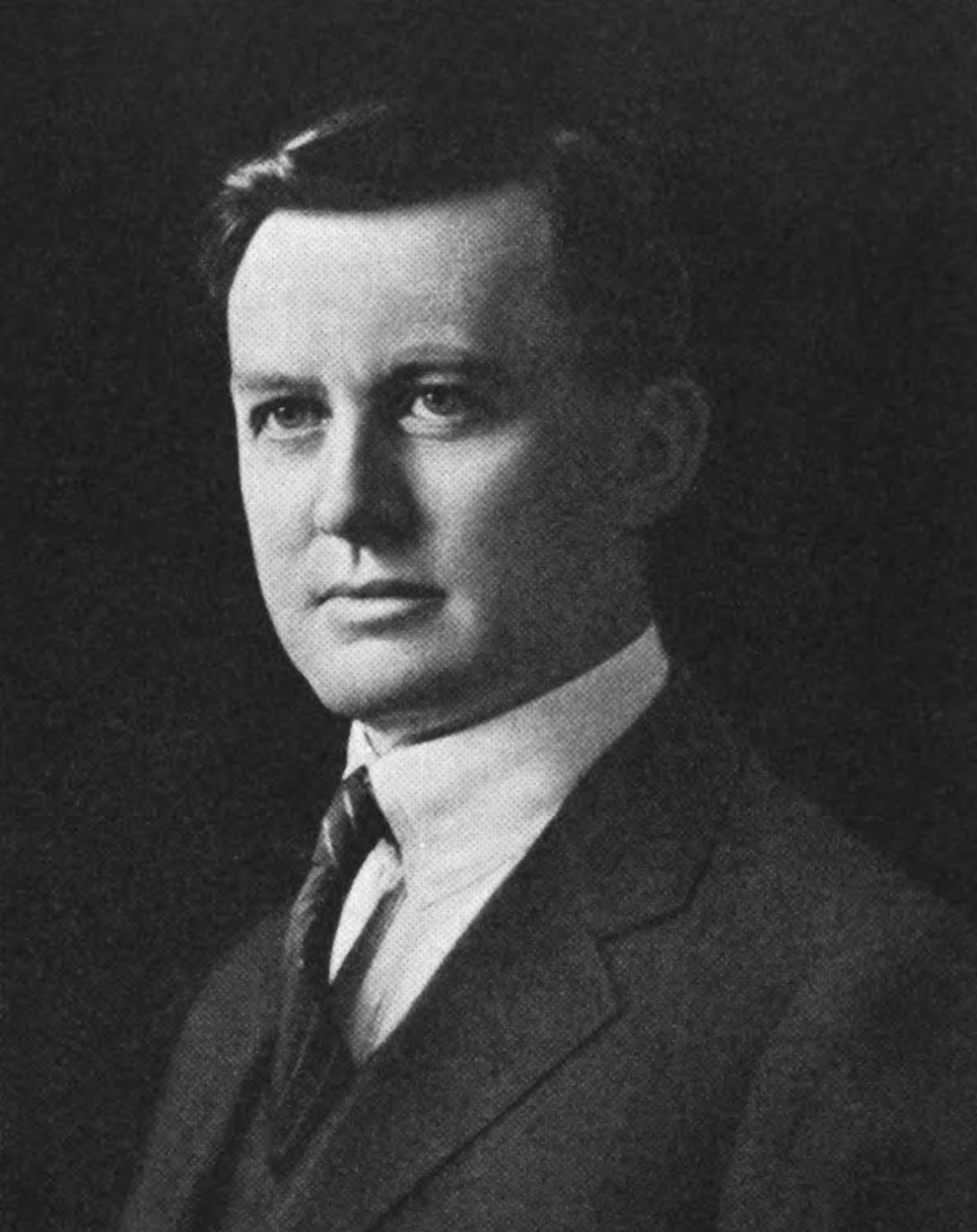
- Oregon state legislator H. J. Overturf, 1922

Member of the Oregon House of Representatives from the 21st district
- In office 1921–1924
- Preceded by: George H. Merryman
- Succeeded by: A. M. Collier

Personal details
- Born: April 6, 1882 Elk Creek, Nebraska, U.S.
- Died: February 6, 1974 (aged 91) Hood River, Oregon, U.S.
- Party: Republican
- Spouse: Ruth Reid Overturf
- Profession: Realtor and construction contractor

Harley James Overturf (also known as H. J. Overturf and Jim Overturf; April 6, 1882 – February 6, 1974) was an American politician and businessman from the state of Oregon. He was a Republican who served four years in the Oregon House of Representatives, where he represented a large rural district in eastern Oregon. Overturf Butte in Bend, Oregon, is named in his honor.

== Early life ==
Overturf was born in Elk Creek, Nebraska, on April 6, 1882, the son of John L. and Alzina (Sheldon) Overturf. He attended school in Nebraska, where he graduated from Lincoln High School before attending a local preparatory school. He then taught school in Nebraska before heading west in 1903.

Overturf arrived in Central Oregon in 1903 with only sixty cents in cash and several hundred dollars in debt. After arriving in Oregon, he filed a timber claim and then quickly sold the property for a profit. He used the money to finance his college education at the University of Oregon. He graduated from the university in 1904, and then returned to Central Oregon, settling in the newly established community of Bend.

== Central Oregon ==
In Bend, Overturf found a job with of the Pilot Butte Development Company. This was the company that had laid out the town of Bend. Within a year, he became the company’s on-site manager and assistant corporate secretary. Overturf remained in that position until 1910 when the company was liquidated. On 25 October of that year, Overturf married Ruth Reid. She had arrived in Bend in 1903 and was the town's first public school teacher. In 1911, he joined two partners to found the Overturf-Davis-Miller Company, a construction supply business. Overturf became the company president. Bend was growing quickly, so his building supply business was very successful. Overturf left the business in 1913 when he became the local agent for the Western Loan and Building Company, a real estate and mortgage business with its headquarters in Salt Lake City.

During this period, Overturf was very active in government and community affairs. In 1907, he was appointed to the vacant city treasurer position in Bend. A month later, he was elected city treasure by a vote of 62 to 1. In 1909, he was elected to a two-year term on Bend city council. After leaving the city council in 1911, Overturf was re-elected to the city treasurer position by a vote of 179 to 115. In 1915, Overturf was appointed to fill a vacant Crook County commissioner position. Later that year, he was elected to a full term as commissioner by a vote of 830 to 730. In 1916, Overturf ran for re-election to the county commission, but lost by a vote of 1,946 to 1,802. However, in the same election, voters approved a ballot measure that created Deschutes County, separating the new county from Crook County. As a result, Overturf’s defeat avoided a problem that would have arisen because he resided in the newly formed Deschutes County; and therefore, was not qualified to serve as a Crook County commissioner.

Overturf was a founding member of the Bend Board of Trade, the Bend Merchant’s Protective Association, and the Bend Commercial Club. As member of the Bend Commercial Club, Overturf was one of the initial investors in Bend-Burns road construction project (now a section of U.S. Route 20). The project connected Bend with the city of Burns, 120 miles (190 km) to the east. Overturf was also appointed to the Oregon Industrial Accident Commission and served on Bend school board for ten years. In addition, he was a member of the local Masons, Elks, Odd Fellows, and Woodmen lodges. During World War I, he was active in several volunteer groups including the Red Cross and local bond drives. In 1918, Overturf attended officer training and was commissioned as a first lieutenant in the Oregon home guard.

== State representative ==
In 1920, Overturf decided to run for a District 21 seat in the Oregon House of Representatives as a Republican. District 21 had two seats so the top two vote getters in the primary advanced to the general election. In the primary, Overturf received 837 votes. This was the most votes received in the primary so he became one of the two Republican candidates carried forward to the general election. He was joined by Republican, Denton G. Burdick, who got 713 votes while the other Republican candidate was eliminated from the race. In the general election, Overturf and Burdick won the two District 21 seats; Overturf receiving 1,831 votes, Burdick getting 1,488 votes with the only Democrat in the race receiving 910 votes.

Overturf took his seat in the Oregon House of Representatives on 10 January 1921, representing District 21. His district included Crook, Deschutes, Grant, Jefferson, Klamath, and Lake counties, a large rural district covering more than 26,800 square miles (69,000 km^{2}). He served through the 1921 regular legislative session which ended on 23 February. During the session, he served as chairman of the railways and transportation committee as well as a member of the irrigation, game, and legislation committees. Overturf also attended a special legislative session in December 1921. That session only lasted six days.

In 1922, Overturf decided to run for re-election. By that time, District 21 had grown enough that a third representative was added to the district. In the Republican primary, Overturf was one of the three Republicans to advance to the general election along with Denton Burdick and J. M. Ezell. The Democratic Party nominated two candidates. All five candidates appeared on the general election ballot. However, a month before the election the state’s World War Veterans’ State Aid Commission fired Overturf from his position as a veteran loan appraiser. The commission alleged that Overturf had inflated the value of some appraisals. This became a state-wide scandal that undermined Overturf’s credibility and threatened to derail his re-election campaign. In the general election, the other two Republicans (Burdick and Ezell) got the most votes, easily winning two of the three District 21 seats. Overturf was also re-elected to the House, but for him it was a very close race. The final vote count, gave Overturf a margin of only 27 votes over Democrat, R. E. Bradbury, 3,675 to 3,648.

The 1923 legislative session began on 8 January with the loan appraisal scandal still making headlines in the newspapers around the state. During the session, Overturf was assigned to the roads and highways, forestry and conservation, alcohol traffic, and printing committees. The session lasted approximately six weeks, ending on 22 February. Just a few days before the end of the legislative session, Overturf and three others were indicted by a federal grand jury for mail fraud associated with the padding veteran loan appraisals.

== Veterans loan scandal ==
The charges against Overturf and the others began with the state's World War Veterans' State Aid Commission which was chaired by Oregon’s governor, Ben W. Olcott. The commission charged that Overturf, Bend’s veteran loan appraiser, and another appraiser from nearby Redmond, were inflating loan appraisals to increase the value of the underlying property. This left the state with undervalued collateral when it made veterans loans.

A grand jury investigated the loan irregularities and found cause to bring charges against Overturf and three Bend area real estate agents. The other appraiser fired by the commission was not charged. Overturf denied the charges and stated that his removal was the result of Governor Olcott's opposition to an irrigation bill he had sponsored during the 1921 legislature session. The bill required the State of Oregon to repay local irrigation districts with interest for state property taxes inappropriately levied against the irrigation districts.

Governor Olcott had vetoed the irrigation bill, but said he had done so for good reason and that his opposition to the bill had nothing to do with the decision to fire Overturf. The rest of the veterans’ aid commission supported the governor, confirming that Overturf’s removal was the result of the commission’s determination that he had inflated property values on veteran loan appraisals. The commission also indicated that Overturf may have benefitted personally from some of the loan transactions. Taking the other side, Bend’s American Legion post voted to support Overturf, recommending that all charges be dismissed.

A trial date was not set for almost a year. As a result of the delay, rumors began to circulate that powerful forces in Federal Government were pushing for the charges against Overturf to be dropped. This prompted Oregon’s new governor, Walter M. Pierce, to formally ask the United States Attorney General for assurances that the case would go forward. The Attorney General confirmed that the prosecution would proceed. The trial date was finally set for April 1924.

The trial began on 21 April 1924. It lasted about two weeks. Near the end of the trial, Overturf testified in his own defense. He denied the charges, but admitted that several appraisals were higher than they should have been due to inaccurate measurements of the properties. In addition, Overturf testified that he had asked the veterans’ aid commission several times for instructions on how to prepare his appraisal, but had received no answer to his queries. The jury deliberated for twelve hours before finding Overturf and other defendants guilty of mail fraud. However, after the verdict the jury petitioned the judge for leniency in sentencing, recommending that Overturf and the others be given fines rather than prison sentences. The judge agreed, giving Overturf a $1,000 fine and the others three defendants $500 fines. Overturf paid his fine and did not appeal the outcome of the trial.

== Later life and legacy ==
Overturf considered running for re-election to his House seat, but the timing of the trial made that impractical. After the trial, Overturf returned to Bend where he continued with his real estate business. He also remained active in civic affairs. In 1930, Overturf was appointed assistant district supervisor for the 1930 census. Later, he shifted into the construction business, supervising United States Forest Service projects in the Deschutes National Forest.

During World War II, Overturf left Bend to become the government construction inspector at Camp White near Medford in southern Oregon. He then went to work for the Civil Aeronautics Administration building air fields around the Pacific Northwest. During this period, he supervised projects at Seal Rock, Oregon, Deek Park and Hoquiam in Washington state, and Lewiston, Idaho.

After the war, Overturf and his wife returned to Bend. In 1953, they retired to Hood River, Oregon. His wife, Ruth Reid Overturf died there in 1965. Overturf died on February 6, 1974, in Hood River at the age of 91.

Today, Overturf Butte in Bend is named in his honor along with a city park. The Reid School in downtown Bend was named after Ruth Reid Overturf. It is now the home of the Deschutes Historical Museum.
