= George H. Merryman =

American politician

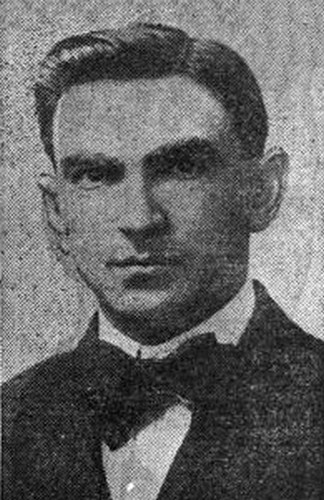
- Representative George Merryman, 1919

Member of the Oregon Senate from the 17th district
- In office 1909–1912
- Preceded by: J. A. Laycock
- Succeeded by: W. Lair Thompson
- Constituency: Crook, Klamath, and Lake counties

Member of the Oregon House of Representatives from the 21st district
- In office 1907–1908; 1919–1920
- Preceded by: John S. Shook (1st term); Vernon A. Forbes (2nd term)
- Succeeded by: Hazen A. Brattain (1st term); H. J. Overturf (2nd term)

Personal details
- Born: 28 June 1878 Astoria, Oregon
- Died: 6 May 1948 (aged 69) Klamath Falls, Oregon
- Party: Republican
- Spouse: Mabel Campbell Merryman
- Profession: Doctor

George Harris Merryman (28 June 1878 – 6 May 1948) was a country doctor, businessman, and politician from the U.S. state of Oregon. A Republican, he served two non-consecutive terms in the Oregon House of Representatives. In between those terms, he was elected to the Oregon State Senate for one term. In both the house and senate, the districts he represented were large and rural. Merryman was also a pioneer doctor who made house calls by horse and buggy for many years. He later built the first modern hospital in Klamath Falls, Oregon.

== Early life ==
Merryman was born in Astoria, Oregon on 28 June 1878, the son of Captain John D. and Rebecca Ann (Eagleton) Merryman. His father was the collector of customs in Astoria for several years; then became the cashier for the United States Customs House in Portland, Oregon. When his father took that job, his family moved to Hillsboro, Oregon. He attended public school there before enrolling in the Tualatin Academy in Forest Grove, Oregon. He entered Oregon Agricultural College in 1895. He went on to attend the University of Oregon and the University of Illinois College of Physicians and Surgeons in Chicago, where he received his medical degree in 1902.

After completing medical school, Merryman returned to Portland, where he was hired by the Portland Asiatic Steamship Company. He was given the position of ship's doctor on the steamship Indrasamha. In that capacity, he made several trips to the Far East, visiting ports in Japan and China, including Hong Kong. Each round trip voyage took approximately three months.

In 1903, Merry moved to Klamath Falls in southern Oregon. He was one of the area's first doctors. In 1904, Merryman became the coroner for Klamath County, serving in this position through 1906. The Klamath Basin was a relatively undeveloped area, so Merryman made most of his house calls by horse and buggy. Even after he acquired his first automobile in 1911, he continued to make some house calls on horseback to avoid getting his vehicle stuck on rugged country roads.

During this period, Merryman also became actively involved in professional and community affairs. He was a member of the American Medical Association and the Oregon Medical Society as well as the medical societies in Klamath and Lake counties. He was a member of the local Masons lodge, the Klamath Elks lodge, and the local Rotary club. He was also a member of the Military Order of the Loyal Legion.

In 1910, Merryman married Mabel Edith Campbell, a local schoolteacher. Together they had two sons.

== Political career ==
Merryman, a Republican, entered state politics in 1904 when he was elected a delegate representing Klamath County at Oregon's state Republican convention. Two years later, he decided to run for a seat in the Oregon House of Representatives. In the Republican primary, Merryman and Horace P. Belknap (another physician) were nominated for the two District 21 seats. Since no Democrats filed for nomination, both Merryman and Belknap were unopposed in the general election. Merryman took his seat in the Oregon Legislative Assembly when the 24th regular session was called to order on 14 January 1907. As a District 21 delegate, he represented a very large and rural district that included Crook, Grant, Klamath, and Lake counties. At that time, Crook County also included what are today Deschutes and Jefferson counties. Together these counties covered over one-quarter of the land area of Oregon. During the session, he served on the medicine and pharmacy committee as well as the salaries and mileage committee. The session ended on 23 February.

In 1908, Merryman decided to give up his House seat and run for the state senate in District 17, representing Crook, Klamath, and Lake counties. In the Republican primary, Merryman beat Judge L. T. Willits by 40 votes, lost in Crook and Lake counties by small margins, but won by enough in Klamath County to carry the election. After winning the Republican primary, Merryman faced the Democratic nominee, G. Springer, in the general election. The general election was another close race, with Merryman winning by a margin of 301 votes. He lost in Crook County by 295 votes, but won in Klamath County by 446 votes and in Lake County by 150 votes.

His election to a four-year state senate term allowed him to attend the regular legislative sessions in both 1909 and 1911. During the 1909 session, which began on 11 January, Merryman served on the ways and means, enrolled bills, irrigation, public lands, and medicine, pharmacy and dentistry committees. The 1909 session lasted six weeks, ending on 20 February.

Since he was serving a four-year term, Merryman did not have to run for re-election in 1910. The 1911 legislative session began on 9 January and lasted through 18 February. During that session, Merryman was appointed to the federal regulations, claims, irrigation, and medicine, pharmacy and dentistry committees. In 1912, Merryman decide not to run for a second term in the state senate, and he returned to his medical practice in Klamath Falls. However, he remained active in Republican politics, serving as a state committeeman and attending the state Republican conventions.

After being out of state government for six years, Merryman decided to run once again for a seat in the Oregon House of Representatives. In the 1918 campaign, he promoted conservation and economic growth. He also supported development of war industries, especially food and lumber production. In addition, he highlighted his previous experience in the legislature. Merryman and Denton G. Burdick won the Republican nominations for the two House seats in District 21. No Democratic filed for the District 21 seats, but an independent candidate, P. H. Dencer, ran in the general election again the two Republicans. In the general election, voters selected Merryman and Burdick for the two District 21 seats. The 1919 legislative session began on 13 January and lasted through 27 February. During the session, Merryman served as chairman of the irrigation committee. He was also appointed to the engrossed bills and food and dairy products committees. In 1920, he decided not run for re-election.

== Later life ==
After finishing his second term in the House, Merryman remained active in Republican politics, serving as a member of the state central committee. He also ventured into business. He was a founding partner of the Crater Lake Box Company, located in Bray, California. He took an active part in the company's management until the facility burned in 1928. While the lumberyard was saved, the structural loss was estimated to be $100,000. After the fire, Merryman and his partners decided not to rebuild the plant. Merryman also served on the Oregon Bank and Trust Company's board of directors, becoming chairman of the board in 1932.

Merryman maintained his Klamath Falls medical practice throughout his life. He built Hillside Hospital in 1929. The hospital opened on 1 May with over 2,000 people touring the new facility on opening day. It was the first hospital in the city to be certified by the Joint Commission on Accreditation of Hospitals. Merryman ran the hospital until it was sold in 1946. He also continued to stay up-to-date on medical practices, attending postgraduate medical courses and clinics in places like in Seattle, New York City, and Vienna, Austria.

Merryman died on 6 May 1948 at his Hillside Hospital in Klamath Falls. He was 69 years old at the time of his death. A Methodist service was held for him at a local chapel. He was then interred in a family plot at the Linkville Pioneer Cemetery in Klamath Falls. In his will, Merryman left his entire estate, valued at approximately $40,000, to his wife Mabel.
