= Middleton, Oregon =

Unincorporated community in the state of Oregon, United States

- Unincorporated community
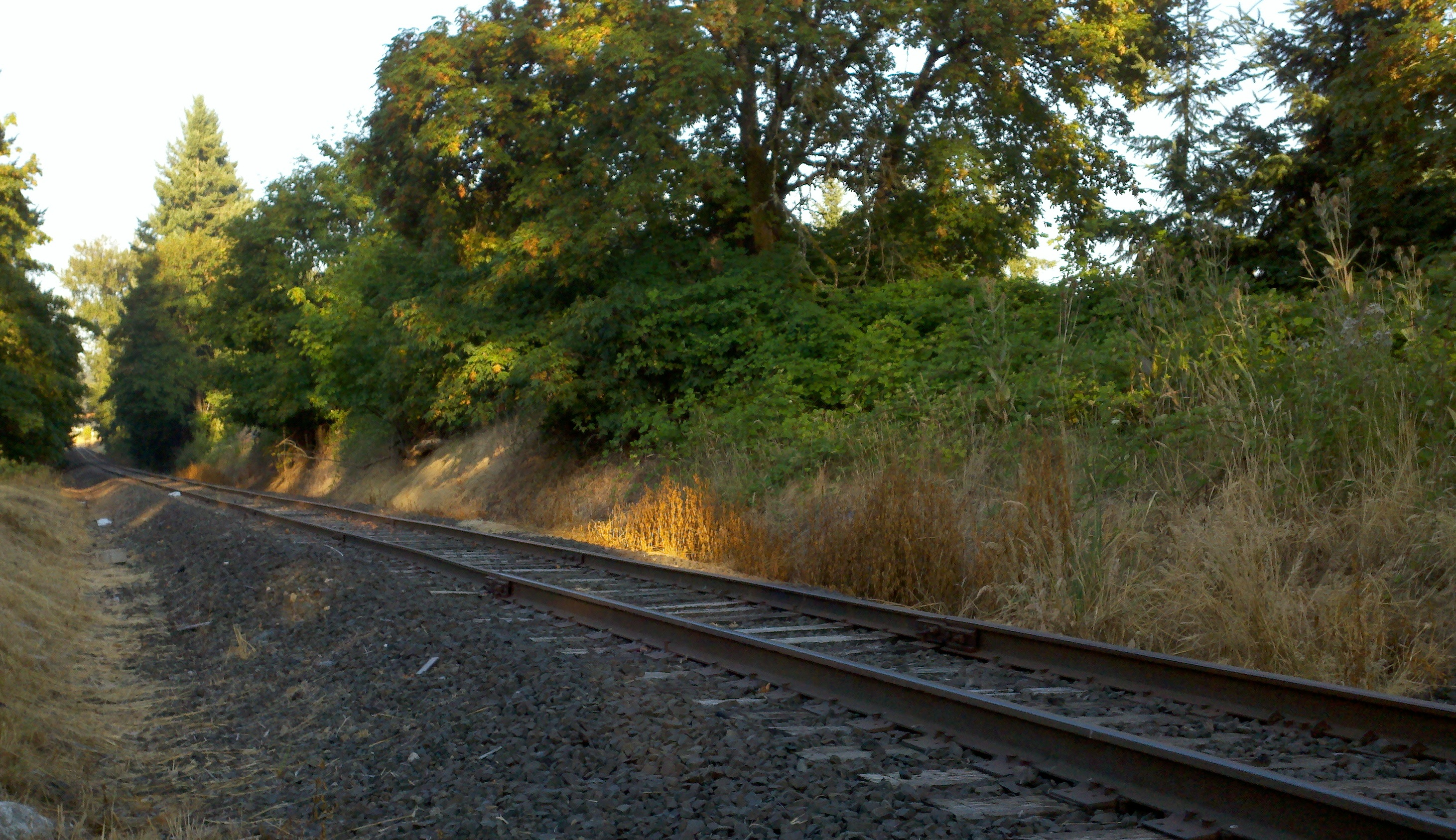
- Railroad tracks at Middleton

- Location within Oregon Location within the United States
- Coordinates: 45.344°N 122.865°W
- Country: United States
- State: Oregon
- County: Washington
- Elevation: 217 ft (66 m)
- Time zone: UTC-8 (Pacific (PST))
  - Summer (DST): UTC-7 (PDT)
- ZIP code: 97140
- Area codes: 503, 971

Middleton, previously known as Stringtown, is an unincorporated community in Washington County, Oregon, United States. To improve communication between Portland and Lafayette, a post office was established at Middleton in 1869. A rail station was then established on July 1, 1892, soon before the post office closed, in 1905. A November 2011 vote for the annexation of portions of Middleton north of Brookman Road by the neighboring incorporated community of Sherwood failed.
