= Vernon A. Forbes =

American politician (1883–1918)

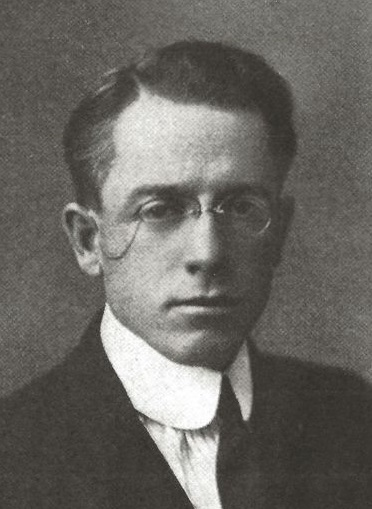

Member of the Oregon House of Representatives from the 21st district
- In office 1913–1918
- Preceded by: Horace P. Belknap
- Succeeded by: George H. Merryman

Personal details
- Born: October 17, 1883 Near St. Croix Falls, Wisconsin, U.S.
- Died: July 7, 1918 (aged 34) Klamath County, Oregon, U.S.
- Party: Republican
- Spouse: Ann Markel
- Profession: Attorney

Vernon A. Forbes (October 17, 1883 – July 7, 1918) was an American attorney and state legislator from the state of Oregon. After graduation from law school in Minnesota, he moved to central Oregon and opened a law office in the city of Bend. Forbes was a Republican who served three two-year terms in the Oregon House of Representatives, representing Crook, Deschutes, Grant, Jefferson, Klamath, and Lake counties. He drowned during a fishing trip near the end of his third term in the legislature.

== Early life ==
Forbes was born on October 17, 1883, in St. Croix Falls, Wisconsin. He was the son of Smith R. Forbes and Mary Elizabeth (Outcelt) Forbes. He attended public elementary school in St. Croix Falls and then Osceola High School, graduating in 1904.

After high school, Forbes decided he wanted to join the legal profession. To prepare for law school, he attended Macalester College in Saint Paul, Minnesota, for two years. Forbes then enrolled in the University of Minnesota Law School. In law school, he was known for his logical and clear thinking. He graduated from that institution with a Bachelor of Laws degree in 1909.

== Professional and personal life ==
After finishing law school, Forbes moved to Bend, Oregon. He was admitted to the Oregon bar in 1910. He was successful in his private law practice, specializing in land and irrigation litigation. He also handled personal lawsuits and criminal cases. His clients included some of the largest companies operating in central Oregon. Forbes was also the attorney for the City of Bend and Bend's school district. Forbes quickly earned the respect of his peers throughout central Oregon. In 1913, Charles W. Erskine joined his law practice as an associate. Their partnership lasted until 1915, when Erskine became Crook County's assistant district attorney.

In 1914, Forbes married Ann Markel, a teacher at Bend High School. A native of Illinois, she attended Rockford College before moving to Bend in 1909. Together, they had one son, Vernon A. Forbes, Jr.

Forbes was present in Salem on December 14, 1916, when Governor James Withycombe signed the proclamation officially creating Deschutes County. After the new county government was organized, Forbes filed the first lawsuit in Deschutes County circuit court on December 20, 1916, seeking to recover $298 for his client. In early 1917, he filed the county's first divorce petition for one of his clients.

Forbes was also a prominent member of the Bend community. He was active in politics and civic affairs. In politics, he was a strong supporter the Republican Party. After the United States entered World War I, Forbes supported the war effort, serving as an advisor to the local draft board and speaking at local war rallies. He was a member of the local Knights of Pythias chapter. He was also a member of the Elks and was a leading advocate for establishing an Elks lodge in Bend. In 1917, Forbes was elected temporary chairman of the local Elks members group pending approval of an Elks lodge charter in Bend. In addition, Forbes liked to hunt and fish.

== State representative ==
In 1912, Forbes decided to run as a Republican for a District 21 seat in the Oregon House of Representatives. At that time, District 21 had two seats that represented Crook County (which at that time, still included what is now Deschutes and Jefferson counties) as well as Grant, Klamath, and Lake counties. When he joined the race, Forbes became the first citizen of Bend to file for a state office.

Forbes and Wesley O. Smith of Klamath Falls were the only Republicans to file for the District 21 seats. Since the Republican Party was allowed to nominate two candidates for the two District 21 seats, Forbes and Smith were both nominated in Republican primary. Since no Democratic candidates filed for the District 21 seats, Forbes and Smith were unopposed in the general election.

Forbes took his seat in the Oregon House of Representatives on January 13, 1913, representing District 21. He worked through the 1913 regular legislative session which ended on March 5. During the session, he served on the counties, irrigation, public lands, revisions of law, and rules committees. Throughout the session, Forbes was an active member of the House, both in committees and on the floor. After 1913 legislative session ended, Speaker Clifton N. McArthur appointed Forbes to the Celilo Commission to study the possibility of generating power on the Columbia River at the Celilo Falls site.

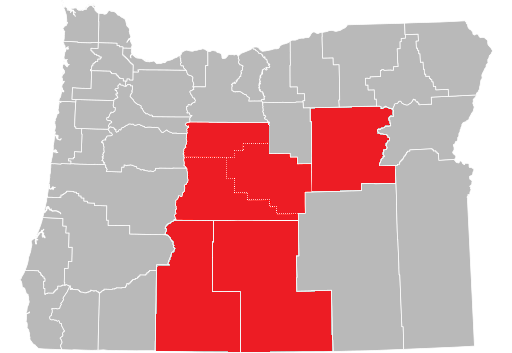
Oregon House District 21, 1913–1918

In 1914, Forbes decided to run for re-election, seeking to retain his House seat in District 21. He was joined once again by Wesley Smith, the two incumbents filing as Republicans. There were also two candidates running in the Democratic primary, P. H. Dencer of Bend and Fred W. Hyndman of Klamath Falls. Since there were two District 21 seats available both parties could nominate two candidates for the general election. As a result, all four candidates were advanced to the general election. In the general election, Forbes and Smith retained their House seats. The final general election tally was 1,366 votes for Smith, 1,157 votes for Forbes, 982 votes for Hyndman, and 742 votes for Dencer.

Forbes began his second term representing House District 21 on January 11, 1915. The session lasted six weeks, ending on February 20. During the session, Forbes was appointed chairman of rules committee. He also served on the game, irrigation, judiciary, and public lands committees.

In 1916, Forbes ran for a third term in the Oregon House of Representatives. Since the 1914 election, Jefferson County had been separated from Crook County and Deschutes County was in the process of being created. While these changed did not alter the boundaries of District 21, it did add two new counties to the district. After Forbes announced his decision to run for a third term, newspapers began speculating that he may also run for Speaker of the House.

Wesley Smith also filed for re-election in House the District 21. In addition to the Forbes and Smith, two other Republicans, Albert E. Elder of Klamath Falls and Denton G. Burdick of Redmond also filed to compete in the 1916 Republican primary. Fred W. Hyndman filed as a Democrat. Forbes and Burdick won Republican nominations while Hyndman was unopposed in the Democratic primary. Forbes and Burdick then won the two House District 21 seats in the general election.

The Oregon legislature's 1917 regular session began on January 8. Between the 1916 general election in November and the opening of the 1917 legislative session, Deschutes County was officially separated from Crook County. This created a minor issue when Forbes and Burdick were due to be seated in the House chamber and the printed name cards at their desks, which included the counties they represented, did not show Deschutes County. The name cards were quickly sent back to the printing office and new name cards with all six counties correctly annotated were prepared for Forbes and Burdick. During the session, Forbes was appointed chairman of the judiciary committee and was a member of the counties, livestock, and joint rules committees. Once again Forbes was an active legislator. He introduced a bill to consolidate seven agriculture related boards into new state Department of Agriculture with five administrative divisions. The 1917 legislative session ended on February 21.

After the 1917 ended, Forbes returned to his law practice in Bend. In early 1918, newspapers once again began to speculate about Forbes running for Speaker of the House in the next legislative session. However, before the speculation gained momentum, Forbes announced he would not seek a fourth term in the House. He cited his expanding law practice as his rationale for leaving the legislature.

While the regular 1917 legislative session was over, Forbes continued to serve out his two-year term, which lasted through the end of 1918. Back in central Oregon, Forbes continued his law practice and remained active in government affairs. In the spring of 1918, Forbes was appointed to the state land board.

== Death and memorials ==
On July 7, 1918, Forbes and a friend, Ralph Poindexter, went fishing at Crescent Lake, 65 miles (105 km) south of Bend. While fishing some distance from the shore their boat broke apart and both men went into the water. The accident was witnessed by people on the shore and a rescue party rowed out to the site. The rescuers found boat wreckage, but no sign of the two men. An initial search was conducted, but no bodies were found. Additional searches were conducted at the lake, but the water at the accident site was approximately 200 ft (61 m) deep and the initial recovery effort proved unsuccessful. Forbes' body was finally recovered a week after the accident and Poindexter's body was found a few days later.

Funeral services for Forbes were held at the Bend Amateur Athletic Club on July 20, 1918. After the service, Forbes was buried at the Pilot Butte Cemetery in Bend.

The local Knights of Pythias lodge held a memorial service on July 19, 1918, and passed a resolution of condolence which was forwarded to the Forbes family. Later that year, the Deschutes County Bar Association held a special memorial service for Forbes. A year after his death, Bend's newly chartered Elks lodge held a memorial service for Forbes. His fellow Elks credited him with founding the local lodge, even though the charter was not approved until after his death.

Ann Forbes remained in Bend with her young son. She never remarried. She died in 1955.
