= Deschutes Historical Museum =

Museum in Bend, Oregon, US

Coordinates: 44°03′19″N 121°19′02″W

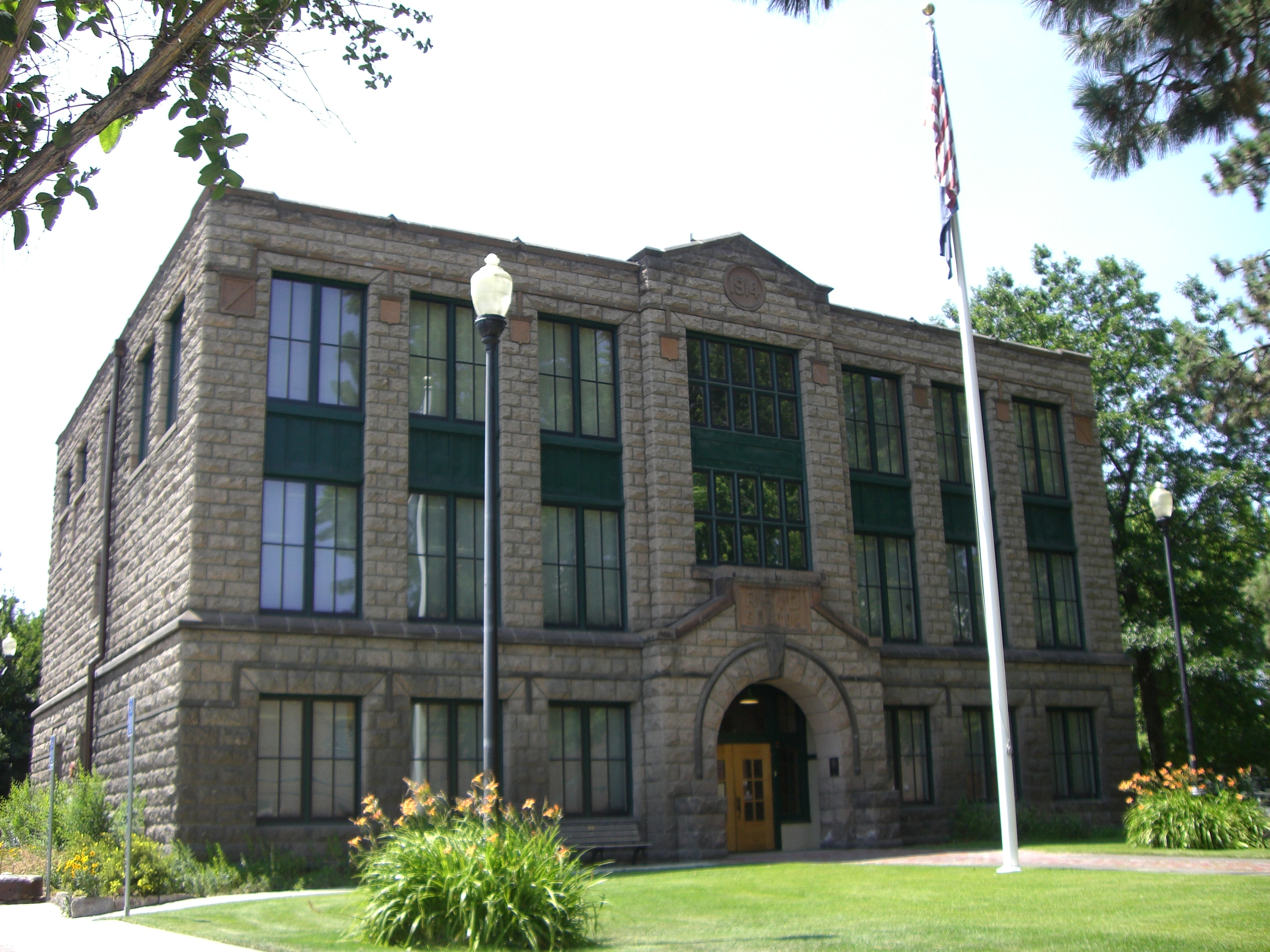
Deschutes Historical Museum

The Deschutes Historical Museum is a museum of local history that is located in the historic Reid School in Bend, Oregon. Opened in 1980 and operated by the Deschutes County Historical Society, the museum's exhibits focus on the area's prehistory, Native American tribes, explorers, pioneers, the logging industry, transportation, and the United States Forest Service. Historic items and antiques are displayed to show home and school life in different periods.

The history library is open to the public and a small bookstore features works on Central Oregon history.

The museum is closed on Sundays and Mondays.
