= Clifton N. McArthur =

American politician

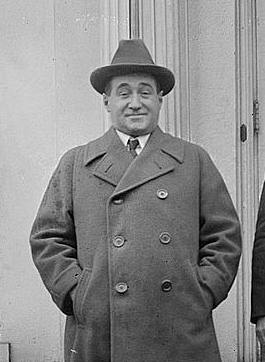

Member of the U.S. House of Representatives from Oregon's 3rd district
- In office March 4, 1915 – March 3, 1923
- Preceded by: Walter Lafferty
- Succeeded by: Elton Watkins

24th Speaker of the Oregon House of Representatives
- In office 1909–1910; 1913–1914
- Preceded by: Frank Davey; John P. Rusk
- Succeeded by: John P. Rusk; Ben Selling

Personal details
- Born: June 10, 1879 The Dalles, Oregon, U.S.
- Died: December 9, 1923 (aged 44) Portland, Oregon, U.S.
- Party: Republican
- Spouse: Lucille Smith
- Occupation: attorney

Clifton Nesmith McArthur (June 10, 1879 – December 9, 1923) was a U.S. representative from Oregon, and grandson of Senator James Willis Nesmith. His father was a member of the Oregon Supreme Court, and Clifton twice served as Speaker of the Oregon House of Representatives.

== Early life ==
McArthur was born in The Dalles, Oregon on June 10, 1879. He was the eldest son of Lewis Linn McArthur, who served on the Oregon Supreme Court, and his wife, the former Harriet K. Nesmith. Clifton's only brother was Lewis A. McArthur, who would write the first edition of the Oregon Geographic Names. Clifton attended the public schools at Rickreall, and the Bishop Scott Academy in Portland. In 1901 he graduated from the University of Oregon.

After college he worked as a reporter for the Morning Oregonian from 1901 to 1903. McArthur then engaged in agricultural pursuits near Rickreall from 1903 to 1906 and studied the law in order to become a lawyer. He was admitted to the bar in 1906 and commenced practice in Portland. On June 25, 1913, he married Lucille Smith, and they would not have any children.

== Political career ==
In 1908, McArthur served as secretary of the Republican State central committee. Then from 1908 until 1911 he was secretary to Oregon Governor Frank W. Benson. During part of this time he was elected to serve in the State house of representatives in 1909 and 1913 as a Republican representing Multnomah County. McArthur served as Speaker of the Oregon House of Representatives in 1909 and 1913.

Clifton McArthur was elected as a Republican to the Sixty-fourth and to the three succeeding Congresses, serving from March 4, 1915, until March 3, 1923. He was an unsuccessful candidate for re-election in 1922 to the Sixty-eighth Congress.

== Later life ==
McArthur resumed the practice of his profession and his former business activities in Portland, Oregon, where he died December 9, 1923, following what was described as a "supposedly routine sinus operation". His remains were cremated and the ashes deposited in the vaults of the Portland Cremation Association.

U.S. House of Representatives
Preceded by Walter Lafferty	Member of the U.S. House of Representatives from Oregon's 3rd congressional district March 4, 1915 – March 3, 1923	Succeeded by Elton Watkins
