= John P. Rusk =

American politician (1873–1943)

John (Jerry) Rusk
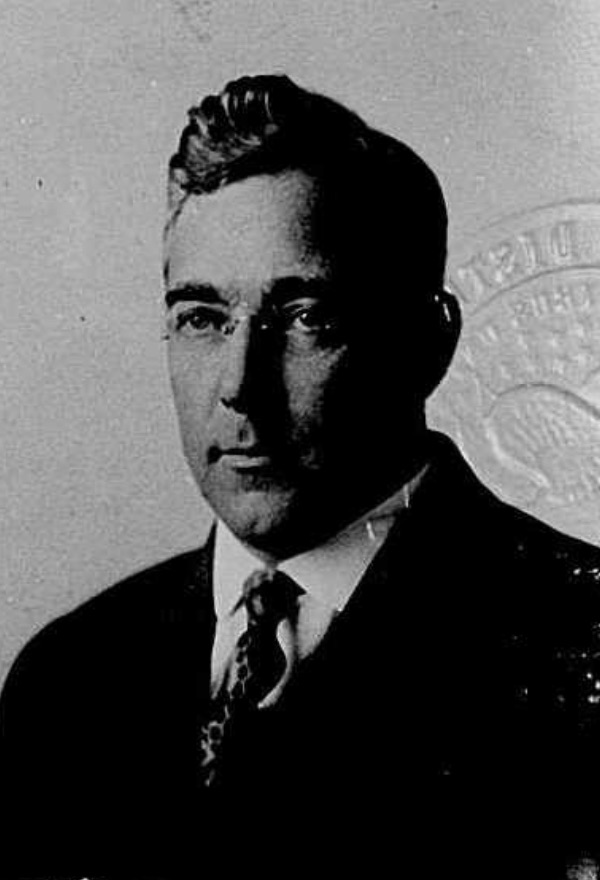
- Head shot of Rusk from a 1918 passport application

Speaker of the Oregon House of Representatives
- In office 1911–1913
- Preceded by: Clifton N. McArthur
- Succeeded by: Clifton N. McArthur

Member of the Oregon House of Representatives for Wallowa County
- In office 1908–1913

Personal details
- Born: John Perley Rusk; June 17, 1873 Milwaukie, Oregon, U.S.
- Died: December 8, 1943 (aged 70) Silver Spring, Maryland, U.S.
- Party: Republican (before 1930); Democratic (from 1930)
- Spouse: Agnes M. Vest (m. 1905)
- Education: Stanford University
- Profession: Lawyer

John Perley "Jerry" Rusk (June 17, 1873 – December 8, 1943) was an American politician who served in the Oregon House of Representatives.

Rusk was born in Milwaukie, Oregon in 1873 and attended Portland University and Stanford University for his schooling. He returned to Oregon in 1900 and began to practise law first in Portland, then in Joseph, Oregon in 1903. In 1906, he became deputy district attorney of Wallowa County, Oregon, and served until 1908. From 1908 to 1913, Rusk, a Republican, served in the Oregon House of Representatives for Wallowa County. From 1911 to 1913, he was chosen to serve as the Speaker of the Oregon House of Representatives. He attempted to run for the United States House of Representatives in the 1912 election, but lost the Republican primary to represent the state's 2nd district to Nicholas J. Sinnott.

Rusk later settled in Newcastle, Wyoming and continued his law practice. He was elected to the office of prosecuting attorney of Weston County, Wyoming in 1925. He had defeated the incumbent, James A. Greenwood, whom he later accused of retaining items that had belonged to the public office. The two men engaged in a fist fight in which Rusk sustained a fractured skull. Rusk made another unsuccessful attempt at running for Congress in 1930, this time as a Democrat in Wyoming. He died in Silver Spring, Maryland in 1943.
