= Wesley O. Smith =

American businessman and politician

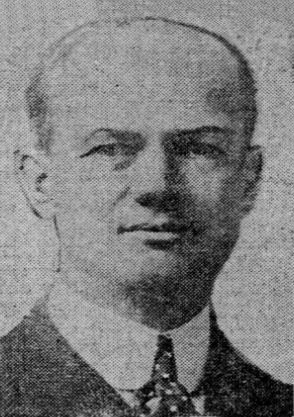
- State representative W. O. Smith, 1914

Member of the Oregon House of Representatives from the 21st district
- In office 1913–1916
- Preceded by: W. Lair Thompson
- Succeeded by: Denton G. Burdick

Personal details
- Born: April 16, 1878 French Lake, New Brunswick, Canada
- Died: October 20, 1951 (aged 73) Klamath Falls, Oregon, U.S.
- Party: Republican
- Spouse(s): Jessie Applegate; then Lena L. (Applegate) Hargus
- Profession: Publisher and businessman

Wesley Oliver Smith (April 16, 1878 – October 20, 1951), commonly known as W. O. Smith, was an American newspaper publisher and businessman from southern Oregon. He owned the Klamath Republican and later the Evening Herald, both Klamath Falls newspapers. Smith was a Republican who served two two-year terms in the Oregon House of Representatives, representing what are today Crook, Deschutes, Grant, Jefferson, Klamath, and Lake counties.

== Early life ==
Smith was born on April 16, 1878, in French Lake, an unincorporated area of New Brunswick, Canada. He was the son of George F. Smith and Anna Smith. His family left Canada and moved to Eau Claire, Wisconsin, when he was eight years old.

In 1895, Governor William H. Upham commissioned Smith as a second lieutenant in the Wisconsin National Guard. He served in Company E of the Third Wisconsin Volunteer Infantry from the time of his commissioning to August 1897. Company E was based in Eau Claire. With the onset of the Spanish–American War, Smith rejoined the Wisconsin National Guard as a non-commissioned officer. He served as first sergeant for Company E. After the war, Smith moved to Harrison, Idaho, where he briefly worked cruising timber before moving on to Klamath Falls, Oregon.

== Life in Klamath Falls ==
In Klamath Falls, Smith worked for a short time in the lumber business. Then in 1903, he bought the Klamath Republican from W. Huse and Sons. The Klamath Republican was a weekly newspaper that had been published in Klamath Falls since 1896. When he took charge of the paper, Klamath Falls had five newspapers competing for reads in a community of only 3,000 people.

Smith married Jessie Applegate on December 11, 1904. She was the youngest daughter of Captain Ivan D. Applegate, an early Klamath County pioneer. Nine months later, she died in Klamath Falls, three days after giving birth to a son. Smith married his second wife, Lena L. Hargus, on October 24, 1906. She was the widow of Doctor H. B. Hargus, and was also the sister of Smith’s first wife. They remained together for the rest of his life.

In 1908, Smith acquired another Klamath Falls newspaper, the Evening Herald (now the Herald and News), from its founder Fred Cronemiller. After buying the Evening Herald, he purchased and installed a new Linotype machine, the first automated typesetting machine in the Klamath Falls area. Under his management, the Evening Herald became the area’s leading newspaper. Smith continued to publish the Klamath Republican along with the Herald. He eventually changed the Klamath Republican from a weekly to a semi-weekly publication. In 1914, he merged it in to the Evening Herald as a semi-weekly supplement.

Smith also started a printing business in Klamath Falls. His printing firm was called W. O. Smith Printing Company. While it was separate from his newspaper, it was located in the same building as the Evening Herald.

Smith was also a prominent member of the Klamath Falls community. He was active in civic affairs and local politics. He helped finance construction of the local Odd Fellows building, the first large office building in Klamath Falls. He also joined the local Elks lodge and helped raise funds to build the Klamath Falls Elks building. Smith later served as president of the local Elks lodge. In politics, he was a strong supporter of the Republican Party, serving as a recording clerk for the Klamath Falls voting precinct and then as chairman of the Klamath County Republican Central Committee.

== State representative ==
In 1912, Smith decided to run as a Republican for a District 21 seat in the Oregon House of Representatives. At that time, District 21 had two seats that represented Grant, Klamath, and Lake counties as well as Crook County (which at that time, still included what are now Deschutes and Jefferson counties). Smith and Vernon A. Forbes of Bend were the only Republicans to file for the District 21 seats. Since the Republican Party was allowed to nominate two candidates for the two District 21 seats, Smith and Forbes were both nominated in the Republican primary. Since no Democratic candidates filed for the District 21 seats, Smith and Forbes were unopposed in the general election.

Smith took his seat in the Oregon House of Representatives on January 13, 1913, representing District 21. He worked through the 1913 legislative session which ended on March 5. During the session, he served on the powerful ways and means committee as well as the irrigation committee. Later in the session, Smith was appointed to a special committee assigned to investigate conditions in Oregon’s state prisons. Smith was an active member of the House throughout the session. A fiscal conservative, Smith successfully pushed a bill through the legislature that standardized government accounting within the state. After the session, he received special recognition from eastern Oregon farmers for his work on the irrigation committee.

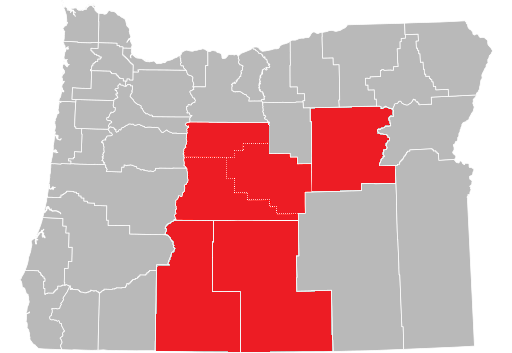
Oregon House District 21, 1913–1918

In 1914, Smith decided to run for re-election, seeking to retain his District 21 House seat. He was joined by fellow incumbent Republican, Vernon Forbes. There were also two candidates running in the Democratic primary, P. H. Dencer of Bend and Fred W. Hyndman of Klamath Falls. Since there were two District 21 seats available both parties could nominate two candidates for the general election. As a result, all four candidates were advanced to the general election. In the November election, Smith and Forbes retained their House seats. The final general election tally was 1,366 votes for Smith, 1,157 votes for Forbes, 982 votes for Hyndman, and 742 votes for Dencer.

Smith began his second term representing House District 21 on January 11, 1915. The session lasted six weeks, ending on February 20. During the session, Smith was appointed to the ways and means, irrigation, military affairs, and printing committees.

In 1916, Smith ran for a third term in the Oregon House of Representatives. Since the 1914 election, Jefferson County had been separated from Crook County and Deschutes County was in the process of being created. While these changes did not alter the boundaries of District 21, it did add two new counties to the district. While Smith and Forbes had been the only two Republicans to file for the District 21 seats in the past two elections, two additional Republicans decided to join the field in 1916. The two new Republican candidates were Denton G. Burdick of Redmond and Albert E. Elder of Klamath Falls. In addition, Fred Hyndman filed as a Democrat. In the Republican primary, Forbes and Burdick were advanced to the general election while Hyndman was nominated in the Democratic primary.

In 1920 and 1922, several Oregon newspapers identified Smith as a possible candidate for one of the District 21 seats. However, he did not run for state office again.

== Later life ==
After his 1916 primary defeat, Governor James Withycombe appointed Smith as Oregon’s delegate to the International Farm Congress and the International Irrigation Congress. Both meetings were held in El Paso, Texas, in October 1916.

In 1920, Smith sold the Evening Herald to E. J. Murray so he could focus on his commercial printing business. He modernized the company's printing operation, acquiring a new press with an automatic press feeder system. In 1926, Smith moved his business to a new modern building in downtown Klamath Falls. Four years later, W. O. Smith Printing Company merged with Drummond Printing of Klamath Falls. The new business brought together a full suite of modern printing equipment under one roof. The company was incorporated in 1929 as Smith-Bates. It was capitalized at $50,000 with 500 shares valued at $100 per share. Smith and his wife were primary shareholders.

Instead of returning to state politics, Smith ran for a city council position in Klamath Falls. He was elected and took his seat in 1921. He served two terms on the city council. After leaving the council, he continued to serve Klamath Falls as chairman of the city’s budget committee. In 1930, the city of Klamath Fall decided to update its city charter. Smith was appointed chairman of the 15-person committee that evaluated various options for improving the city’s government. His committee recommended the city adopt a new form of government based on a city manager structure.

Smith also remained involved in fraternal and civic affairs. He was active in the local Elks lodge. He helped establish a Boy Scout program in Klamath Falls. Smith was also a founding member of the local Rotary club and was that organization’s first president. In addition, he served as president and trustee of the local golf country club.

Due to an extended illness, Smith was confined to his home for the last six years of his life. He died at his home in Klamath Falls on October 20, 1951, at the age 73. His funeral service was held at the Klamath Falls Elks lodge on October 23, 1951. Smith was buried in the Linkville Cemetery in Klamath Falls.
