= Denton G. Burdick =

American journalist

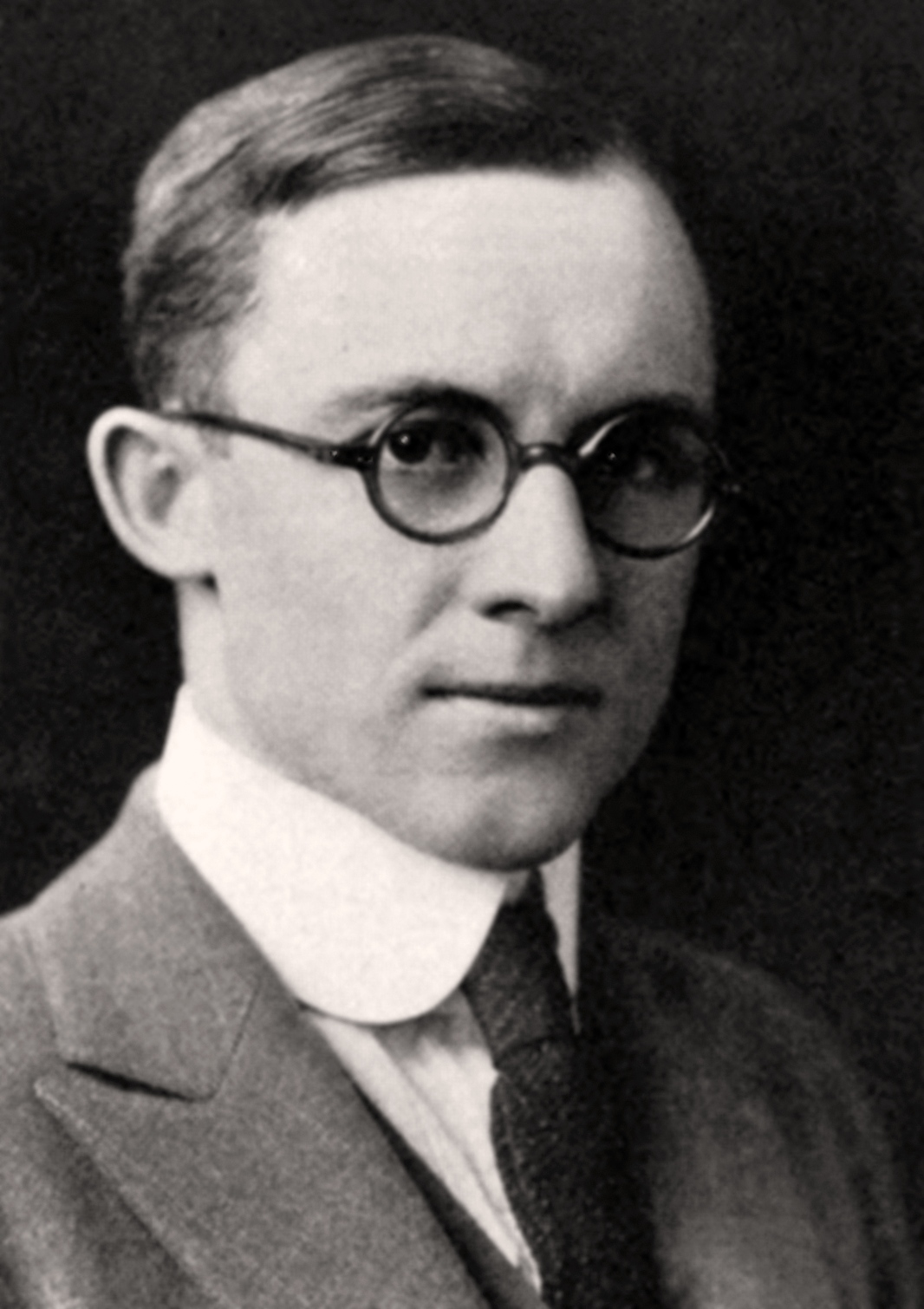
- Oregon state legislator Denton Burdick, 1922

31st Speaker of the Oregon House of Representatives
- In office 1925–1926
- Preceded by: Kaspar K. Kubli
- Succeeded by: John H. Carkin

Member of the Oregon House of Representatives from the 21st district
- In office 1917–1930
- Preceded by: Wesley O. Smith
- Succeeded by: Perry O. DeLap

Personal details
- Born: March 25, 1891 Sault Ste. Marie, Michigan, United States
- Died: September 1, 1970 (aged 79) Portland, Oregon, United States
- Party: Republican
- Profession: Attorney, banker

Denton Graves Burdick (March 25, 1891 – September 1, 1970) was an American politician and attorney from the state of Oregon. He was a Republican who served fourteen years in the Oregon House of Representatives, where he represented a large rural district in eastern Oregon. He served as Speaker of the Oregon House of Representatives during the 1925 legislative session. At the time he was elected speaker, he was the youngest person in Oregon history to serve in that position.

== Early life ==
Burdick was born in Sault Ste. Marie, Michigan on 25 March 1891, the son of Nelson A. and Minerva (Hicks) Burdick. He attended school there, graduating from high school at the age of sixteen. Later, his family moved to Fargo, North Dakota. Burdick attended college at the University of Iowa. He worked his way through the law school as a journalist, reporting for a North Dakota newspaper.

In 1912, Burdick moved to Central Oregon with his father who had on-going business interests there. He opened a law practice in Redmond, Oregon and joined his father as a partner in several banking and land development enterprises. In 1913, he married Zoa Mae Bronson of Spencer, Iowa. That same year, he became a local police judge in Redmond, a position he kept until 1917.

== State representative (1917–24) ==
In 1916, Burdick ran for a seat the Oregon House of Representatives as a Republican. He was elected at the age of 25 and took his seat in the Oregon House on 8 January 1917, representing District 21. His district included Crook, Deschutes, Grant, Jefferson, Klamath, and Lake counties, a large rural district covering more than 26,800 square miles (69,000 km^{2}). This is larger than a number of eastern states. He served through the 1917 regular legislative session which ended in mid-February. During the session, Burdick proved to be an effective legislator, serving as chairman of the resolutions committee as well as a member of the game, irrigation, and revision of laws committees. After the legislative session ended, Burdick returned to his law practice in Redmond.

In 1918, Burdick decided to run for re-election. He campaigned for better roads in eastern Oregon, credit for farmers and rural development projects, and continued support for the United States war effort in Europe. He was returned to the state legislature in the November 1918 general election. Once the election was over, he began actively seeking support for the speaker of the House position. Burdick secured almost enough pledged votes to be elected speaker, but two other candidates seeking the speaker position combined their efforts and raised a thin majority for Seymour Jones, a representative from Marion County. When the House was organized in January 1919, Speaker Jones appointed Burdick to the judiciary, corporations, and public lands committees. He served through the 1919 regular session from mid-January through the end of February, and then a one-week special session in January 1920.

Burdick ran for re-election again in 1920. A total of four candidates filed for the two seats in House District 21. In addition to Burdick, H. J. Overturf of Bend and H. A. Brattain of Paisley filed as Republicans while R. E. Bradbury of Klamath Falls was the only Democrat to file in District 21. Burdick and Overturf were nominated in the Republican primary and went on to beat Bradbury in the general election. He served through the 1921 session from 10 January through 23 February and then in a short special session in December of that year. During these sessions, Burdick was chairman of the judiciary committee and as a member of the resolutions, roads and highways, irrigation, and fisheries committees.

In early 1922, Burdick announced he would run for a fourth term in the House; and if elected, he would be a candidate for speaker. As part of his campaign, Burdick traveled around the state meeting with Republican legislative candidates seeking their support for speaker. Jay H. Upton, central Oregon's influential state senator, joined him in many of these meeting. Burdick and two other Republicans won District 21's three House seats. However, Kaspar K. Kubli of Multnomah County was elected speaker. Burdick served in the 1923 legislative session from 8 January through 22 February. During the session, he was a member of the resolutions, expositions and fairs, irrigation, and revision of laws committees.

== State representative (1925–30) ==
Burdick ran for re-election in 1924, campaigning for immediate expansion of the state's highway system and against any tax increases. Burdick won both Republican and Democratic primaries so was unopposed in the general election. Within two weeks of the general election, 55 of the 60 state representatives had pledged to support Burdick for speaker. The 1925 legislative session opened on 12 January, Burdick was elected the presiding officer in the House. At the time he was elected, Burdick was the youngest person ever elected speaker. During the six-week session, Burdick was recognized for his leadership and organizational efficiency.

In March 1926, Burdick file for re-election in District 21. He won the Republican primary and was then unopposed in the general election. While he was the incumbent speaker, he did not run for a second term in that post. He served in the 1927 legislative session as chairman of the judiciary committee and was also a member of the resolutions committee. During the session, he focused on water and irrigation related legislation, introducing several bills that would have freed irrigation districts from state certification and eliminated the state's irrigation oversight board.

In 1928, Burdick ran for a seventh term in the House. He easily won one of three District 21 seats. Shortly after the general election, Burdick announced that he planned to relocate to Portland once the legislative session was over. Then the day before the legislative session began, he was injured in an automobile crash on icy road near Sisters, Oregon. He broke his collar bone in the accident but was able to return to the legislature before the session ended.

== Later life and death ==
Shortly after the 1929 legislative session adjourned on 4 March, Burdick moved his family to Portland. However, he kept his law office in Redmond open. The family also retained their summer home on the Metolius River. Once he was settled in Portland, Burdick continued his law practice throughout Oregon.

In May 1929, a former client named Sarah Smith-Shollard sued Burdick for $46,500. Smith-Shollard had hired Burdick to recover approximately $2,000,000 from her former husband. While Burdick was successful in reclaiming some of her lost assets, Smith-Shollard believed he should have recovered more. Burdick counter sued Smith-Shollard for unpaid legal bills that she still owed him. Eventually, Burdick won a $24,000 judgement against Smith-Shollard after she failed to appear in court. At the time, her new lawyer said he had not heard from her in over two years, since she filed the original lawsuit.

In 1936, Burdick announced that he would once again run for a seat in Oregon House of Representatives, this time representing Multnomah County. However, he withdrew from the race a few weeks later, citing on-going business activities as his reason.

Burdick remained a practicing attorney for a number of years, retiring sometime before 1963. He died 1 September 1970 in Portland, Oregon at the age of 79.
