= McCoy, Oregon =

Unincorporated community in the state of Oregon, United States

- Unincorporated community
- Location within Oregon Location within the United States
- Coordinates: 45°02′31″N 123°12′58″W
- Country: United States
- State: Oregon
- County: Polk
- Elevation: 171 ft (52 m)

Population (2013)
  - Total: 5.6
- Time zone: UTC-8 (Pacific (PST))
  - Summer (DST): UTC-7 (PDT)
- ZIP code: 97371
- Area codes: 503 and 971
- GNIS feature ID: 1166679

McCoy is an unincorporated community in Polk County, Oregon, United States. It was named after the landowner Isaac McCoy. Its post office was established in 1879 with James A. Sears as the postmaster, and closed in 1968.
