= W. Lair Thompson =

American politician and lawyer

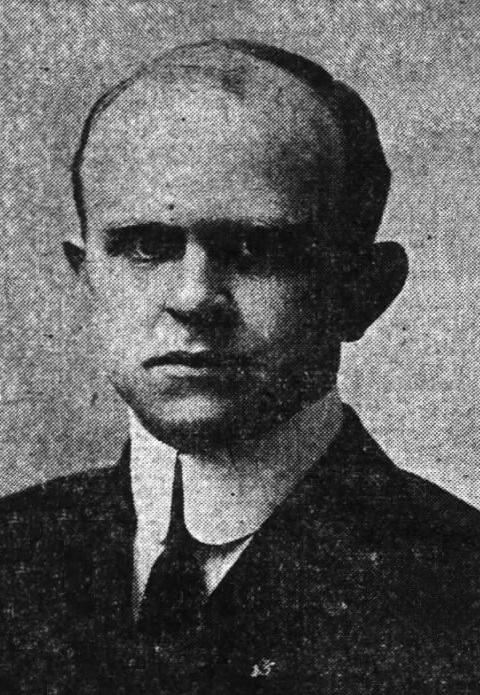
- Oregon State Senator Lair Thompson, 1915

22nd President of the Oregon State Senate
- In office 1915 – 1916
- Preceded by: Daniel J. Malarkey
- Succeeded by: Gus C. Moser

Member of the Oregon Senate from the 17th district
- In office 1913 – 1916
- Preceded by: George H. Merryman
- Succeeded by: George T. Baldwin
- Constituency: Crook, Klamath, and Lake counties

Member of the Oregon House of Representatives from the 21st district
- In office 1911 – 1912
- Preceded by: Hazen A. Brattain
- Succeeded by: Wesley O. Smith

Personal details
- Born: January 1, 1880 Linn County, Oregon, U.S.
- Died: August 5, 1940 (aged 60) Bend, Oregon, U.S.
- Party: Republican
- Profession: Attorney

William Lair Thompson (January 1, 1880 – August 5, 1940), known as Lair Thompson or W. Lair Thompson, was an American politician and lawyer from the state of Oregon. He served one term in the Oregon House of Representatives followed by a four-year term in the Oregon State Senate. Thompson was a conservative Republican who represented a large rural district. He served as President of the Oregon Senate during the 1915 legislative session. Thompson was one of Oregon's most prominent trial attorneys, handling a number of high-profile cases including one, Bunting v. Oregon, that required him to present arguments before the United States Supreme Court.

== Early life ==
Thompson was born on January 1, 1880, in Linn County, Oregon, the son of Rufus and Adaline (Hill) Thompson. His father was a successful rancher, and for a time, a postmaster. Thompson attended public school in Albany, Oregon, and worked as a printer's apprentice at the Albany Herald for 3 years before entering McMinnville College in 1897. While at college, Thompson won a statewide oration contest in 1900. He graduated from McMinnville College with a Bachelors of Arts degree in 1902. Thompson then returned to Albany where he managed and edited the Albany Herald while studying for the Oregon State Bar examination. He passed the bar in 1904 and began a law practice in Albany.

In 1905, Thompson was appointed chief clerk for the Oregon House of Representatives. He served during the 1905 legislative session which began in January and lasted about six weeks. After the session adjourned, Thompson returned to Albany and resumed his private law practice. Later that year, he was elected Albany city recorder and police judge. He married Elsie Hobbs on September 19, 1906, at her home in Eugene, Oregon. Thompson was reappointed as chief clerk for the legislature's regular 1907 session, which lasted from mid-January through February 23. After the session ended, Thompson returned to Albany for a short time. He resigned as Albany city recorder in May 1907 and moved to Lakeview, Oregon, in June. Later that year, Thompson was elected Lakeview's city attorney. Over the next few years, he built a successful private law practice, bought ranch property in south central Oregon, and joined several civic and fraternal groups. He became a respected Republican Party leader with a statewide reputation.

== State representative ==
Thompson, a Republican, was elected to the Oregon House of Representatives in 1910. He was one of two House members elected to represent District 21, a very large, rural district which included Crook (at that time, Crook County included what is now Crook, Deschutes and Jefferson counties), Grant, Klamath, and Lake counties. After he was elected, Thompson announced he would run for Speaker of the House, one of three legislators seeking that post. In the House, Republicans outnumbered Democrats 58 to 2, so the struggle for speaker was between various factions of the Republican Party. As the leader of the conservative Republican bloc in the House (a group Oregon newspapers called the Old Guard), Thompson made a very strong run for the speaker position. Ultimately, he fell short of the votes he needed and threw his support behind John P. Rusk. His support gave Rusk the votes necessary to be elected speaker, though two House members still voted for Thompson.

Thompson was an active leader throughout the session. When Rusk, a progressive Republican, failed to appoint conservatives to key committees, a number of Thompson supporters tried unsuccessfully to remove the speaker. The 1911 legislative session lasted less than two months, from January 9 through February 18. After the session, Thompson returned to his law practice in Lakeview. Later that year, he joined Doctor Bernard Daly and other prominent civic leaders to successfully advocate for the completion of the Nevada–California–Oregon Railway line north to Lakeview.

== State senator ==
In 1912, Thompson decided to run for the state senate seat in District 17. The senate district included Crook, Klamath, and Lake Counties. He won the Republican primary and then the general election. Some Oregon newspapers considered him a contender for President of the Senate, but he was never a serious candidate for the position. He took his seat in the Oregon Senate on January 13, 1913, and served through the 1913 regular session, which ended on March 3. Since Oregon state senators serve a four-year term, Thompson did not have to run for re-election prior to the opening of the 1915 legislative session. However, once the November 1914 general election was over, he announced that he would actively seek the President of the Senate position. Just a few days after the election, Thompson had 11 of the 16 votes he needed to be elected Senate President. By mid-December, he had enough pledged votes to ensure his election. When the Oregon Senate elected its president in January 1915, Thompson was the only candidate nominated for the position. He received 25 out of 28 Republican votes. In addition, both Democratic senators voted for Thompson. Two Republicans voted for Senator W. D. Wood and Thompson joined them to honor Wood.

During the 1915 legislative session, Thompson proposed a major revision of Oregon's judicial system. The bill would have increased the number of circuit court judges and transferred trial work from county judges (local political leaders) to circuit judges (members of the Oregon Bar). It would also have created a circuit court of appeals. When it became clear the legislature would not pass Thompson's judicial reform bill, he submitted another bill to create a new district judge position for Lake County. That bill was passed near the end of the session. It was reported that some House members feared Thompson might use his position as President of the Senate to hold up House bills if Lake County did not get a district judge. Despite the session's political give-and-take, Thompson was recognized by his senate colleagues for his evenhanded leadership. At the close of the session, all of his colleagues, including the senate's two Democrats and both of the Republican senators who did not vote for him at the beginning of the session, lauded his leadership.

Thompson and Governor James Withycombe, both Republicans, agreed that Bernard Daly, Lake County's long-time county judge and a Democrat, was the right person to be Lake County's new district court judge. As a result, just three days after the 1915 legislative session adjourned, Withycombe appointed Daly to Lake County's new district judge position. Thompson filed for re-election to his state senate in January 1916. He ran unopposed in the Republican primary. Shortly after the primary, he announced he would seek a second term as Senate President and began meeting with carry-over senators and Republican candidates for the senate. However, Thompson lost his senate seat in the general election to Judge George T. Baldwin of Klamath Falls by one vote. Thompson won Crook, Jefferson, and Lake counties with a 325-vote margin, but lost Klamath County by 326 votes. At the time, newspapers speculated that he may have lost his seat as a result of his litigation work dealing with disputed water rights in south central Oregon.

== Trial attorney ==
While he was running for his second term in the senate, Thompson continued his trial work. This included a very important case, Bunting v. Oregon, that eventually was heard by the United States Supreme Court. In that case, Thompson's client was Frank Bunting, a sawmill employee, who was challenging Oregon's ten-hour workday law. Thompson presented Bunting's case to the Supreme Court in April 1916. Despite his arguments, the court ruled in favor of the State of Oregon. Another important case dealt with water rights in the Summer Lake valley and along the Chewaucan River near Paisley, Oregon. Thompson defended the water rights claim of the Chewaucan Land and Livestock Company against development companies and the settlers who bought land from those companies. Initially, the state water board ruled in favor of the developers. The cattle company appealed in state court, and the district judge, Bernard Daly, reversed the water board's decision. The developers then asked the legislature to overrule the district court, but Thompson successfully lobbied his former colleagues to prevent their intervention. This allowed the district court decision to stand.

In April 1917, Thompson decided to leave Lakeview to join a private law firm in Portland. He became a partner in the legal firm of Snow, McCamant, and Bronaugh, replacing Wallace McCamant who had just been appointed to the Oregon Supreme Court. When Thompson arrived in Portland, the firm was renamed Snow, Bronaugh, and Thompson. Later, when McCamant left the Supreme Court and returned to the practice, the firm was renamed McCamant, Bronaugh, and Thompson. Eventually, the firm became McCamant and Thompson (now Miller Nash Graham & Dunn LLP). Over the years in Portland, Thompson handled many high-profile cases, becoming one of Oregon's most prominent trial attorneys. While many of his clients were big corporations, including Portland shipyards and steel companies and large lumber and natural resources companies throughout the Pacific Northwest, he also defended individuals facing criminal charges. For example, he defended a wealthy individual for violating Oregon's Prohibition law in 1918. A year later, he defended an individual against cattle rustling charges in eastern Oregon. On the civil side of the law, Thompson sued six residents of Toledo, Oregon, on behalf of Japanese labors employed by the Pacific Spruce Company, who were driven out of town by a mob of white residents. He also handled the probate for Bernard Daly's substantial estate, which was used to establish the Bernard Daly Educational Fund to provide college scholarships for Lake County students. In 1926, he was elected president of the Oregon State Bar Association.

In 1930, the Oregon Supreme Court appointed Thompson to prosecute George W. Joseph in a disbarment case. This was an extremely high-profile case because Joseph became a candidate for governor just prior to the case going to trial. The trial began on April 15. Joseph won the Republican primary against four other candidates on May 16. On May 27, the Supreme Court announced Joseph's disbarment. Joseph decided to continue his campaign, but died of a heart attack a few weeks later. Thompson's highest profile case was probably the Bowles-Loucks murder case. In 1931, a young millionaire from Portland named Nelson C. Bowles and his secretary Irma Loucks were accused of murdering Bowles' wife, Leone. Thompson led the defense team. The theory he offered the jury was that Leone had committed suicide. The trial became even more sensational when a key prosecution witness was stabbed and beaten at her home during the course of the trial. The witness recovered, but her testimony was not as useful as the prosecution had hoped. In fact, Thompson used her testimony to back up several important defense points. At the close of the trial, the jury took just an hour to acquit both Bowles and Louck.

Thompson suffered a heart attack while returning from a trial in Boise, Idaho, and died at St. Charles Hospital in Bend, Oregon, on August 5, 1940. His funeral took place in Portland.
