= Elliott R. Corbett =

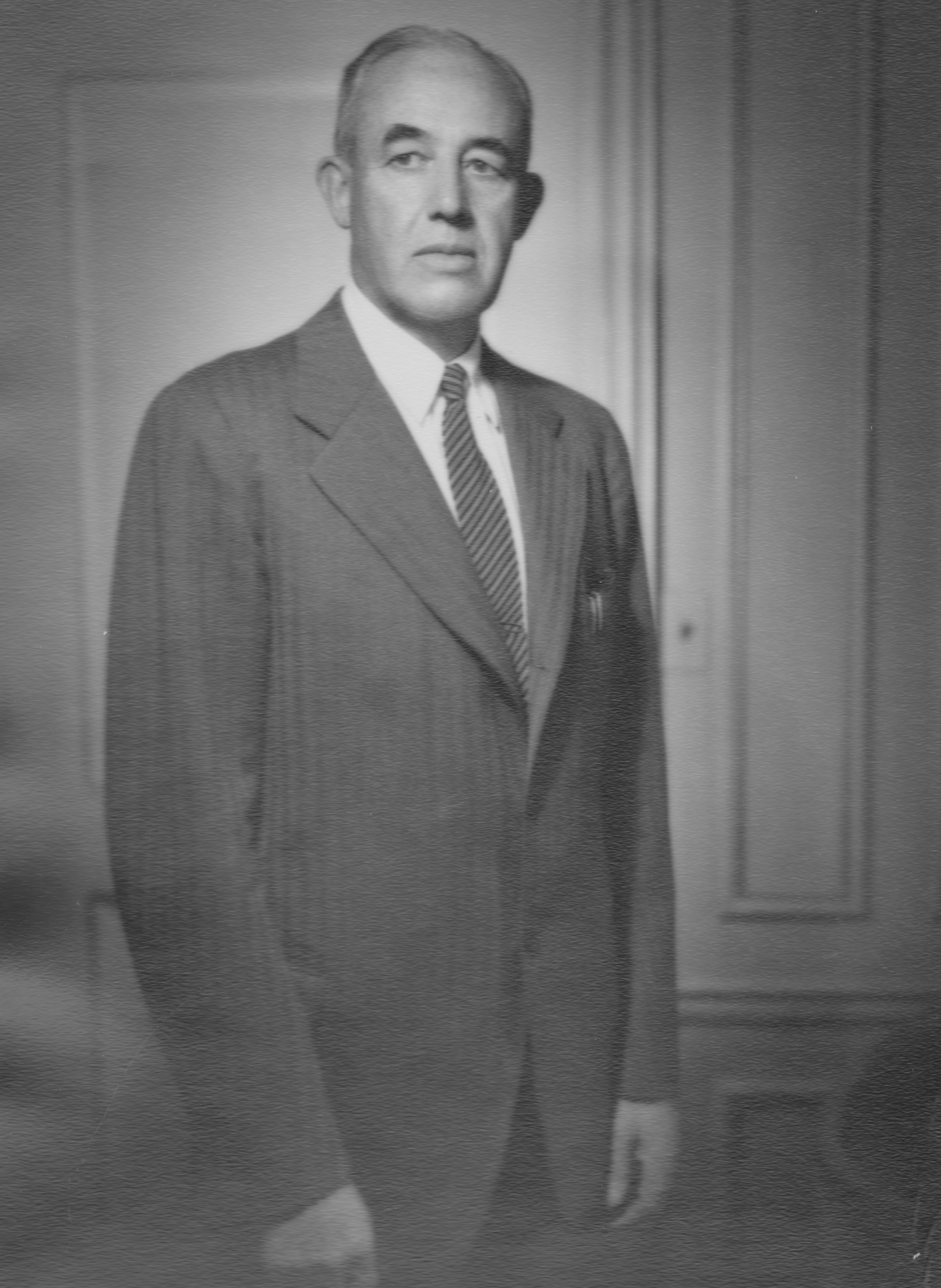

Banker and owner of Portland buildings Civic leader and Benefactor

Personal details
- Born: Elliott Ruggles Corbett; 29 June 1884 Portland, Oregon, United States
- Died: 2 May 1963 (aged 78) Portland, Oregon, United States
- Spouse: Alta Rittenhouse Smith
- Education: Portland Academy; Harvard University
- Occupation: Banker and a builder of Downtown Portland Oregon buildings

Elliott Ruggles Corbett (June 29, 1884 –May 2, 1963) was an American banker, business leader, owner and builder of a number of the city's buildings, as well as civic leader and benefactor.

He was born on June 29, 1884 in Portland, Oregon and died on May 2, 1963 at his home in Dunthorpe, Portland, Oregon, aged 78. He and his two brothers, Henry Ladd Corbett (1881–1957) and Hamilton Forbush Corbett (1888 – 1966) were required at a young age to take on the burdens of the businesses, banking and real estate holdings that their grandfather Henry W. Corbett had developed, as their father Henry Jagger Corbett (and his younger brother Hamilton Corbett) had both died, predeceasing their own father.

== Early life ==
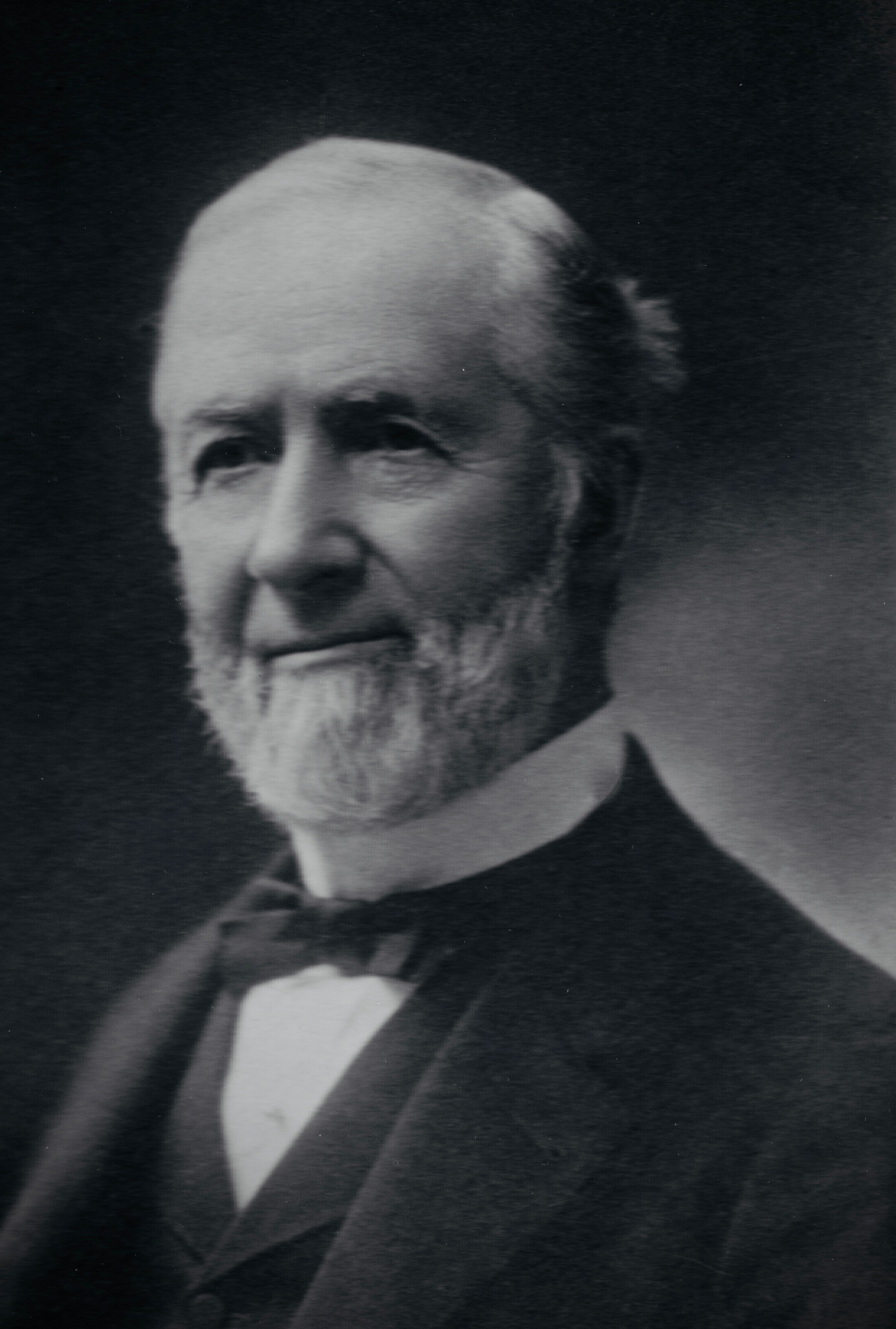
Sen. Henry W. Corbett

Elliot Ruggles Corbett was born on June 29, 1884 in Portland, Oregon to Henry Jagger Corbett (November 6, 1857– March 2, 1895) and Helen Kendall Ladd (1859-1936). Henry's father was United States Senator Henry W. Corbett's eldest son. Henry J. Corbett, Elliott's father, died on 2 March 1895 from tuberculosis in Colorado Springs, Colorado, when Elliott was ten years old. Helen was the eldest daughter of William S. Ladd, one of the senior Corbett's fellow Portland business pioneers and an associate in a number of enterprises.

Henry Jagger Corbett and Helen Ladd had three sons Henry Ladd Corbett (born 28 July 1881), Elliott Ruggles Corbett, and Hamilton Forbush Corbett (born 13 December 1888). Both Henry Jagger and his only brother the original Hamilton Forbush Corbett (1859-1884) died of tuberculosis before their father. Helen was left to bring up the three boys. Elliott Corbett's grandfather, Henry W. Corbett (1827 – 1903) died when Elliott was 18.

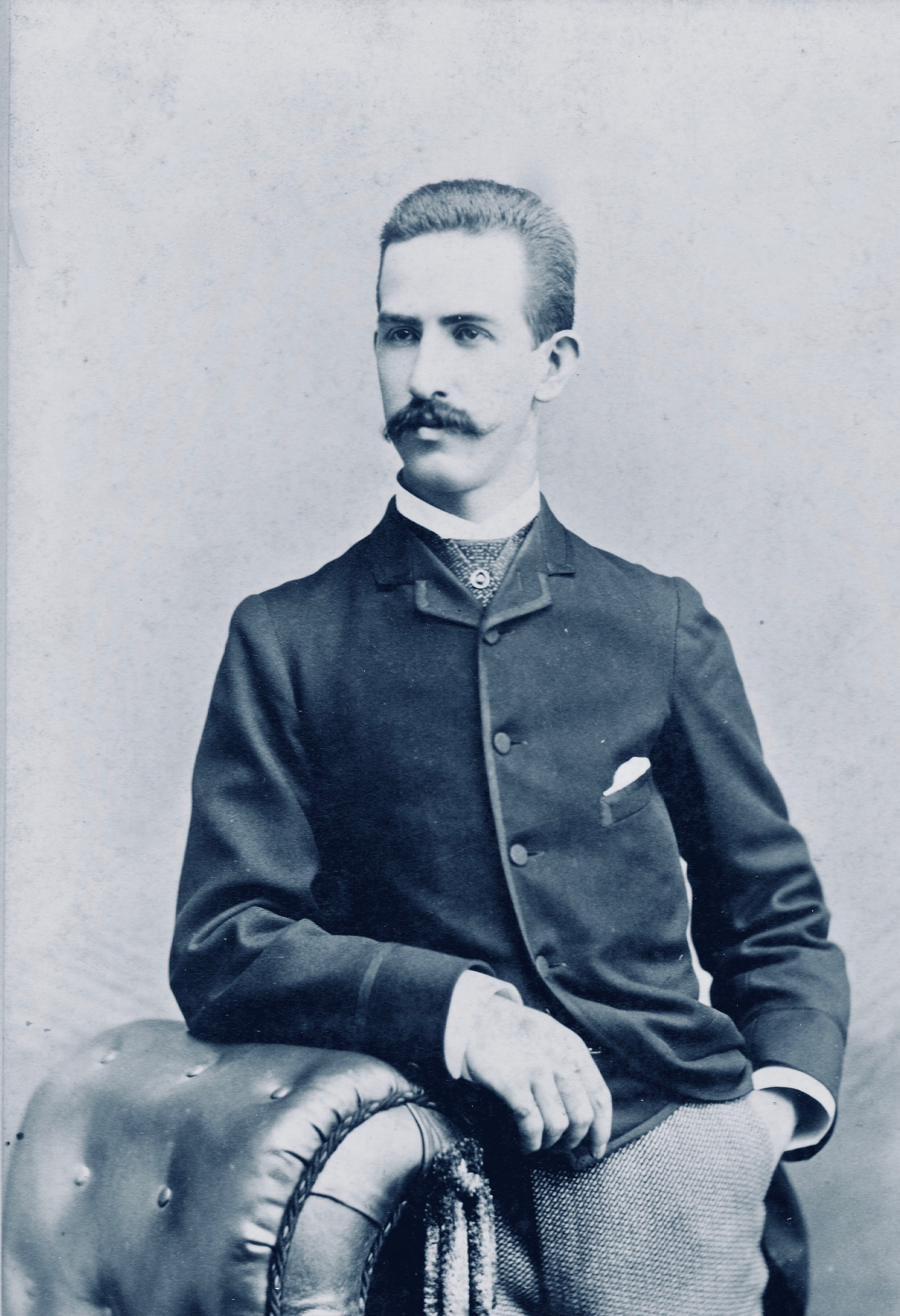
Henry Jagger Corbett (1857–1895) Elliott Corbett's father Photo circa 1887 (aged 30)

== Education ==
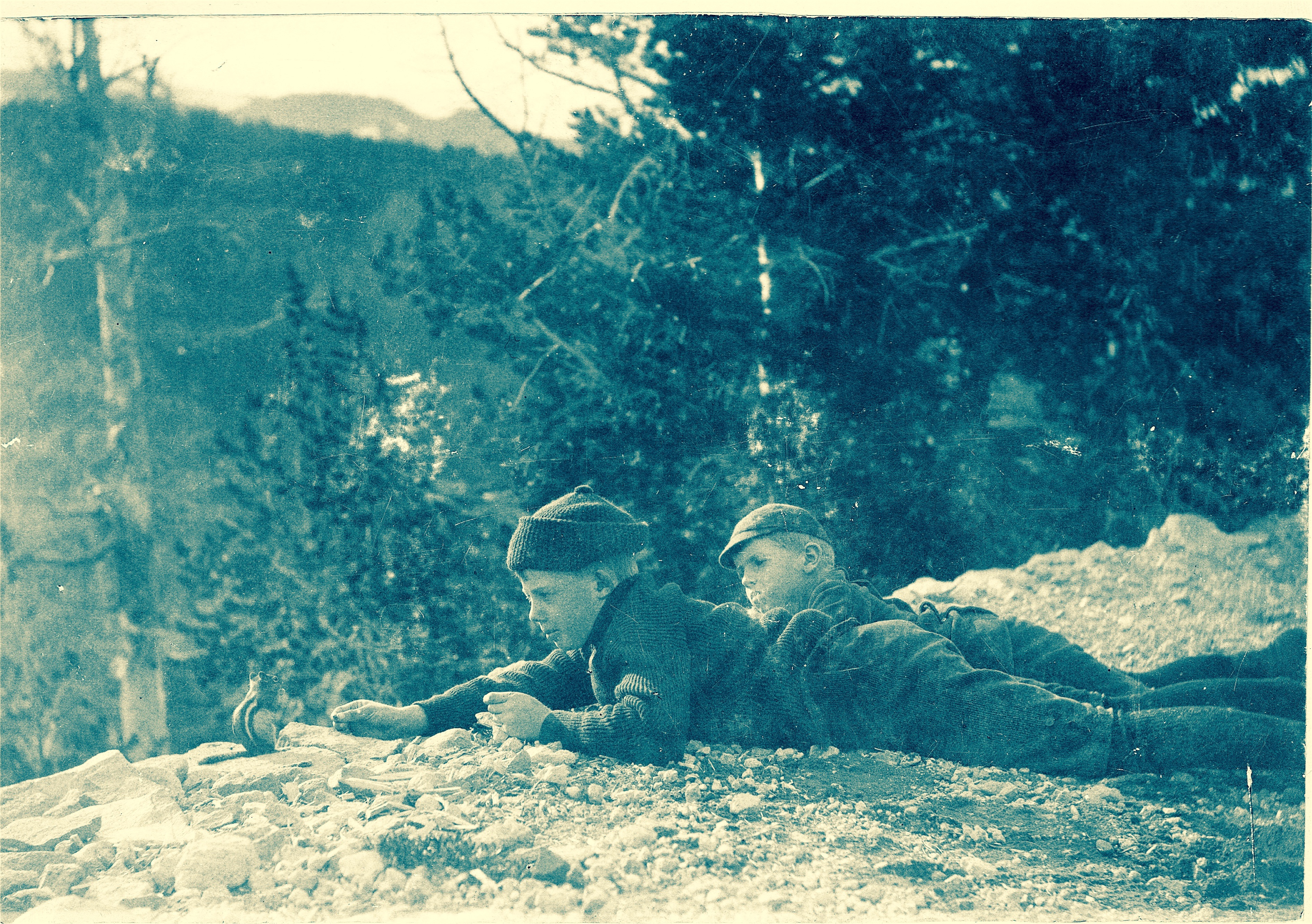
Henry and Elliott Corbett circa 1890 with chipmunk (Elliott R. Corbett Archives)

Elliott was educated at the Portland Academy, a predecessor educational institution of the present Catlin Gabel school. He then went to Harvard University, graduating in 1907, from where his two brothers also graduated. All were football players at Harvard and also became polo players.

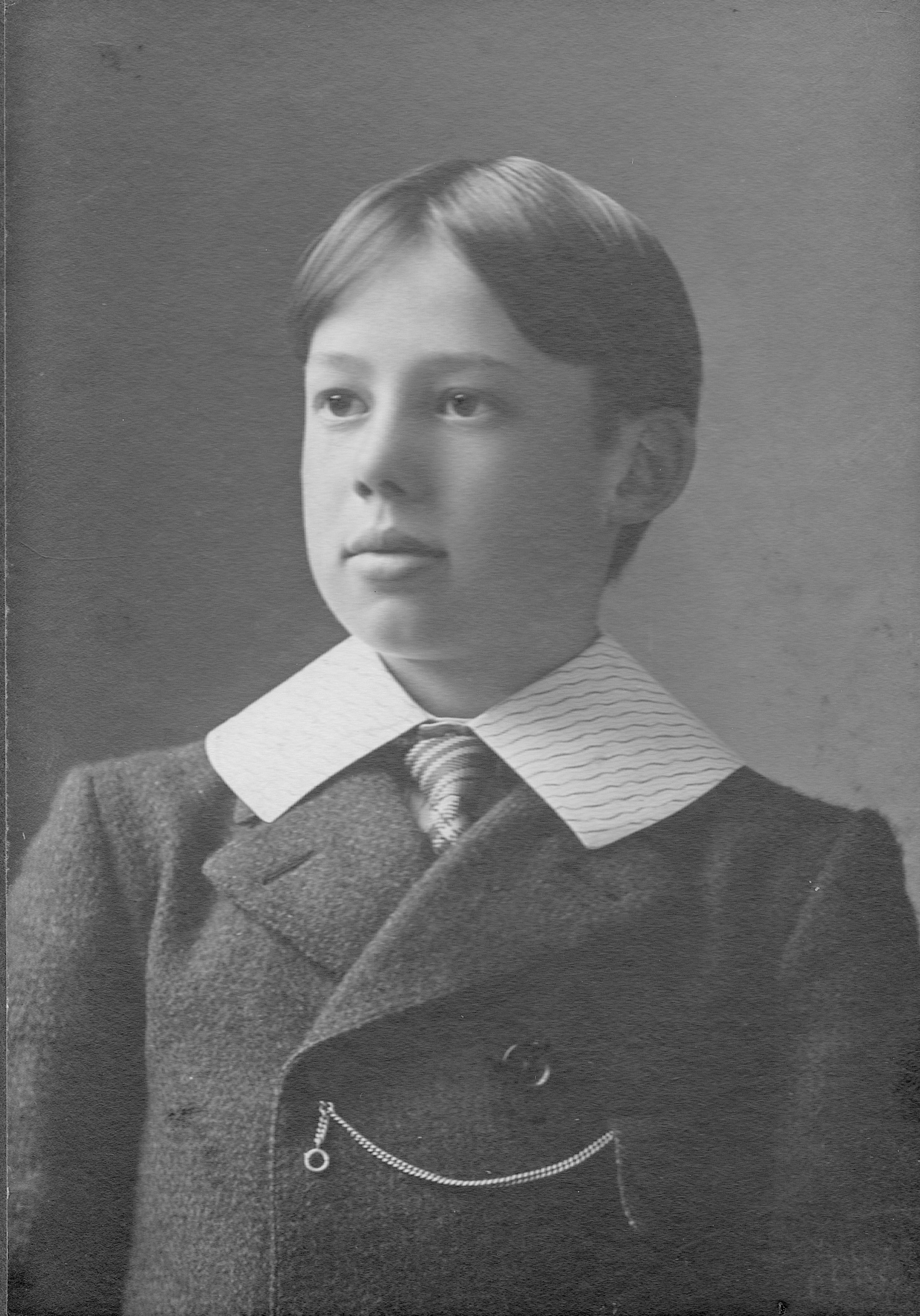
Elliott Corbett shortly after his father's death when he was 10 (Elliott R. Corbett Archives)

His mother was aware that without a father the boys needed to be taught by others the skills that she felt young men would need. So as to be able to acquire good horsemanship and learn to be good shots she sent them as young boys to spend parts of their summers at the P Ranch in the Harney Basin in Eastern Oregon with men who could teach them those. The P Ranch was then owned by the French-Glenn Livestock Company and run by Peter French.

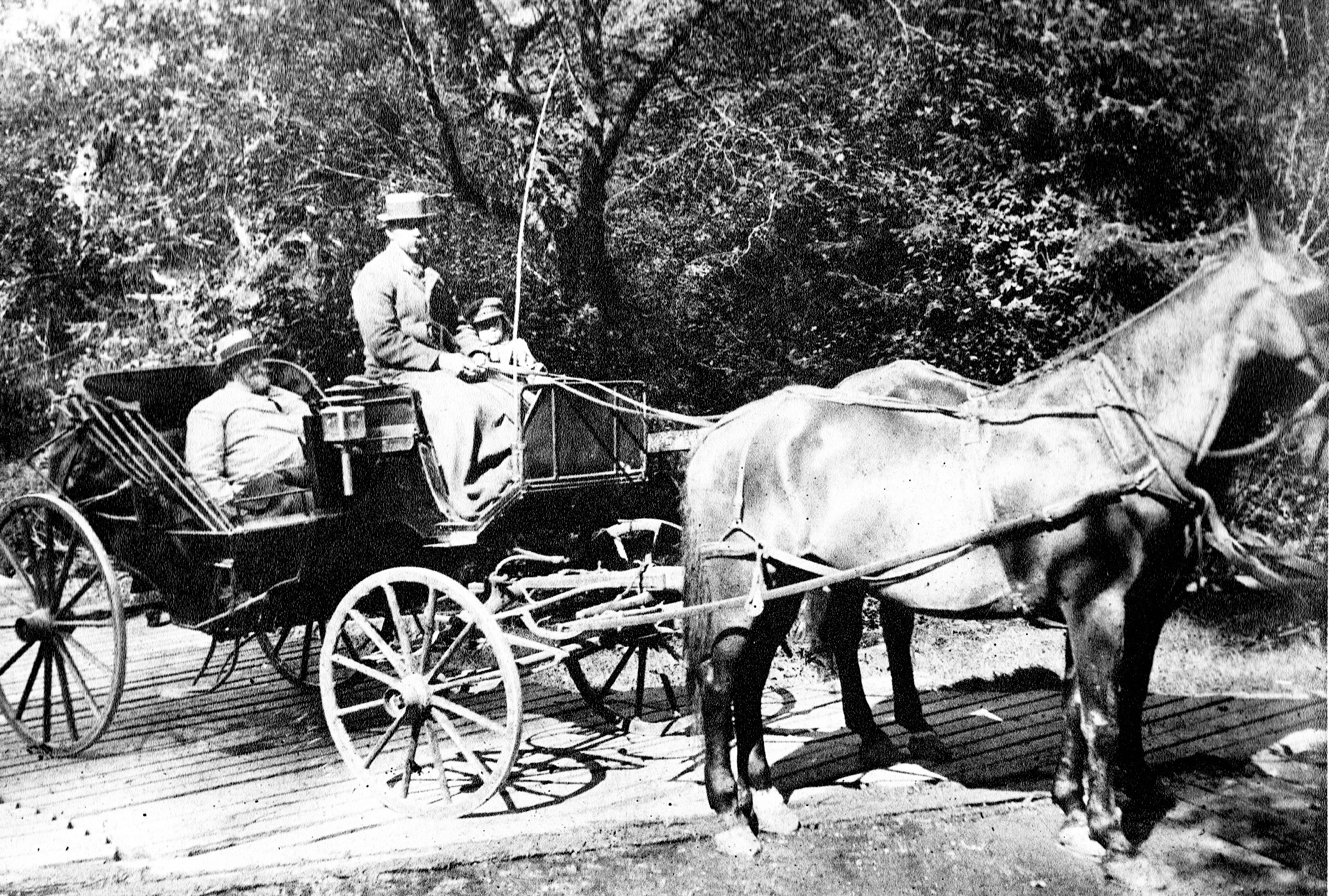
William Sargent Ladd, a business & philanthropic associate of Elliott R. Corbett's paternal grandfather (Henry W. Corbett). Ladd was Elliott Corbett's maternal grandfather and is here with his grandson, Elliott (aged 6) beside coachman, at Seaview, Washington in 1890 where W.S.Ladd and H. W. Corbettt each had beach houses.

There they learned to be expert shots with a rifle, a shotgun and a hand gun (revolver). They learned to rope cattle and herd and tie them, control pack trains, become good outdoorsmen, and set-up camp and learn fly fishing. Their mother also saw that they were well schooled in lesser matters that would serve them in later life, like the proper use of an axe and various practical uses with their hands like how to understand the new motor vehicle engines; be able to fix them, change tires and keep them running on remote journeys; to carve meat expertly for guests for the dinner table and to be able to do things she thought men should be able to do well and with expertise. In this, as a widow, she was successful in preparing them for their life ahead.

== Early responsibilities ==
With the death of their grandfather Henry W. Corbett in 1903, Elliott and his two brothers inherited his businesses, including 27 downtown Portland properties, among them the then First National Bank Building (predating the present one that they later built), The Worcester Block (Third and Oak Sts.), The Cambridge Block (Third and Morrison), the Neustadter building (Ankeny and Fifth), the Hamilton Building (529 SW Third Avenue) as well as majority ownership of the eight floor-326 bedroom Portland Hotel.

Following their grandfather's death, within seven years his estate of 27 downtown buildings increased in value by over 500% owing to the financial boom and population growth stimulated by the Lewis and Clark Exposition, of which their grandfather had been an original financial backer and its chairman.

The brothers also became involved with part of the Ladd estate and businesses which their mother had inherited on the death of her father William S. Ladd, the Corbett brothers' maternal grandfather. She was actively involved with the direction of the Ladd estate businesses along with her Ladd siblings and mother.

In World War I, Elliott served as a first lieutenant in the field artillery, stationed at Camp Zachary Taylor, Louisville, Kentucky.

== Corbett Investment Company ==
Henry L. Corbett (1881-1957). Older brother. (Elliott.R.Corbett Archives)

The Corbett Investment Company was formed by the three Corbett brothers, Henry Ladd Corbett, Elliott Ruggles Corbett and Hamilton Forbush Corbett. The Corbett Investment Company was to serve as the Corbett estate holding company and their investment arm. The shares were equally owned by the three brothers. The brothers divided up Corbett Investment Company responsibilities to play to each of the brother's strengths, their developing expertise and special areas of interest.

- Henry L. Corbett, was the public face of the Corbett brothers. He dedicated most of his time to state politics as a Republican state senator, the Port of Portland Commission and he took myriad other corporate directorships and had many civic and cultural affiliations. He was also mainly responsible for their P Ranch.
- Elliott R. Corbett was responsible for the management of their First National Bank of Portland holdings and the Corbett estate. He also served on family and other boards and was involved in Oregon and civic causes.

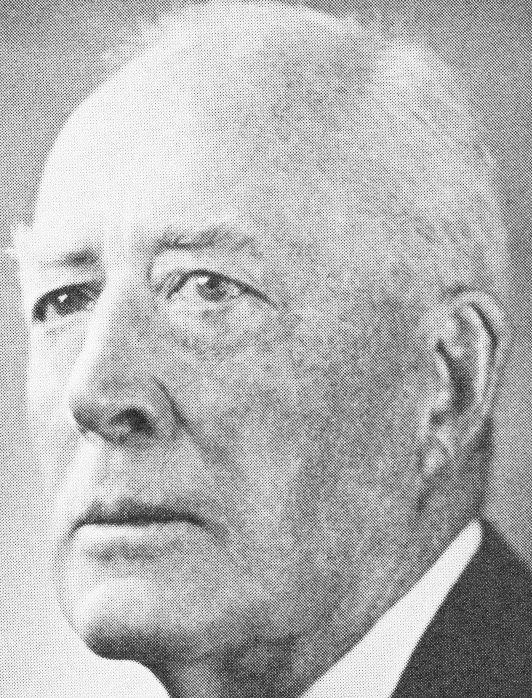
Hamilton F. Corbett (1888-1966). Younger brother. (Elliott R. Corbett Archives)

- Hamilton F. Corbett was President of the Security and Saving Trust Company, a company the brothers controlled through the First National Bank of Portland and President of the Portland Chamber of Commerce. In the First World War he served in France. He aided many civic causes and volunteer organisations.

The three Corbett brothers concentrated their efforts on their real estate businesses, the First National Bank of Portland and its subsidiaries, which they controlled and other investments that needed their own managing and financing. They left their other company holdings inherited from their grandfather H. W. Corbett, with experienced managements already in place, such as their holdings in Union Pacific Railroad, the Portland headquartered Home Telephone Company, the Oregon Electric Railway, the Oregon Surety and Casualty Company, and the Portland Hotel, to largely operate on their own, usually retaining the role of directors (occasionally as officers) or even just passive shareholders so as to free themselves from their active day-to-day management.

The Corbett Investment Company's offices were located in the Corbett Building, at Southwest Fifth Avenue and Morrison, overlooking the Pioneer Courthouse. The brothers completed the building in 1907. The Corbett Investment Company offices were on the tenth floor, Suite 1011 at the north east corner but the mailing address was simply the Corbett Investment Company, Corbett Building, Portland, Oregon. The relatively compact space provided three offices for the brothers and an area for two secretaries and a filing and lunch room. From this modest space they oversaw their entire business holdings with their accountants in a separately accessed office on the same floor of the Corbett building.

In 1956, the brothers sold their remaining buildings and gave up management of downtown Portland properties.

After the deaths of the Corbett brothers, the 81-year-old Corbett Building was demolished by implosion on May 1, 1988.

== First National Bank of Portland ==
The Corbett family had been the major stockholders in the First National Bank of Portland since in 1869 when Henry W. Corbett and his brother-in-law Henry Failing (with his father Josiah Failing) purchased almost all the shares of the Bank. H. W. Corbett held 500 shares, Henry Failing 250 and his father Josiah 50.

The First National Bank of Portland had been the only bank in Portland (and for a long time the only one west of the Rocky Mountains) that was chartered under the National Banking Act. The act was intended to make banking safer and guarantee the value of bank notes in effect creating a nationwide currency. There was no state-banking act in Oregon until 1907 so other banks at the time were strictly private proprietorships taking deposits and lending money without regulation. The First National was the exception from its outset.

On their purchase, Henry Failing had become President of the bank, Henry W. Corbett the Vice-President. Failing held the position until his unexpected death in 1898 when Corbett assumed the President's role until his own death in 1903.

Elliott Corbett looked after the interests of the Corbett brothers in the Bank on behalf of the Corbett estate and also served as Vice-President and a director of the bank.

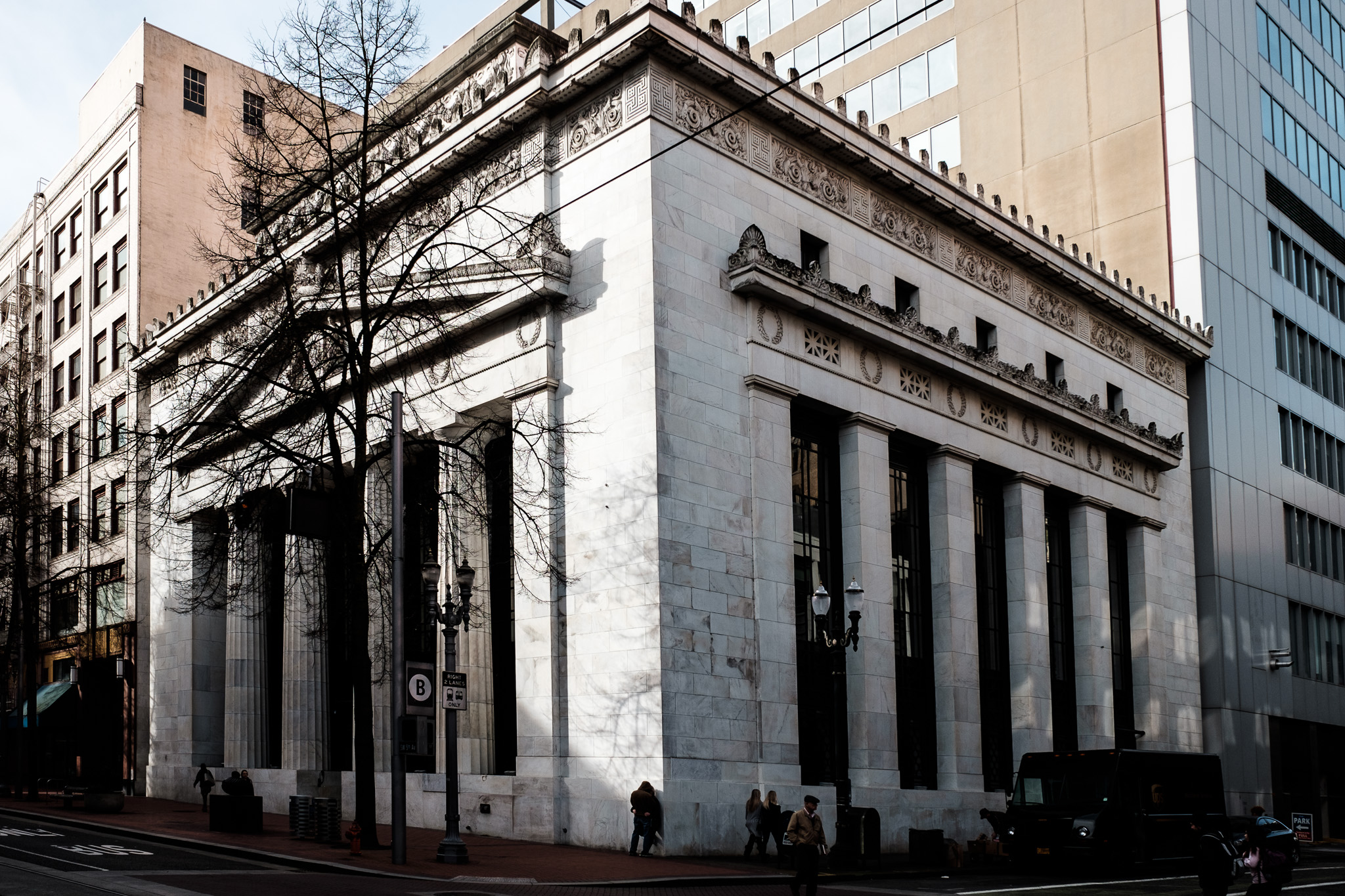
The First National Bank Building. Built in 1916 when Elliott Corbett was responsible for the ownership. (Michael Marlitt photo 2018)

On H.W. Corbett's death Abbot L. Mills was appointed President and the bank continued to prosper and grow. He retired in 1927. C.F. Adams succeeded him as President from 1927 until 1932.

The Bank grew under the Mills and Corbett stewardship and soon had outgrown its quarters, so they constructed a new building as its main office. In 1916, the new First National Bank building was opened at 401–409 SW 5th Avenue, Portland. The building became known as "The Marble Temple".

After Mills' retirement and when his successor C.F. Adams was nearing retirement, Elliott Corbett needed to prepare a successor to Adams. Since 1911, the Strong and McNaughton Trust Company had managed the properties of the Corbett estate. So in 1928, Elliott Corbett offered their Trust a merger with the First National's Security and Saving Trust Company. He also offered the position of a bank vice-president to MacNaughton. MacNaughton accepted Corbett's offer, although Strong opted to remain in his own Trust business managing the Corbett estate.

The West Coast Bancorp merged with the US National Bank in early 1928. With this development Elliott Corbett knew that to stay ahead of their rivals the Corbetts and the other major stockholders, the Failings and Lewis families, would likely have to inject more capital into the bank to expand. Otherwise they could make a public share offering to increase the bank's capital. Elliott Corbett had been concerned for a while that bank shares were undervalued. Banking was therefore a less attractive investment than real estate and other opportunities which were opening up to them for the utilisation of their capital. He and the other stockholders were not in favour of increasing its capital by injecting more of their own or in diluting their own shareholdings by issuing more shares through a public offering. During the years since the Corbetts had been involved, the First National bank had been regarded as solidly run and "typifying the extreme conservatism for which Portland had been celebrated for half a century."

The option was therefore open to them to sell the bank. It was an attractive option for the Corbetts and to the other minority stockholders. A ready purchaser was quickly found in the San Francisco based Transamerica, which owned Bank of America and Bancitaly, which was trying to strengthen its position on the West coast to compete with the New York and East coast banks. An agreement was signed with Transamerica, in June 1930 and completed in 1932.

As a result, for the first time in over sixty years the Corbett family no longer controlled a bank in Portland.

== Portland buildings ==
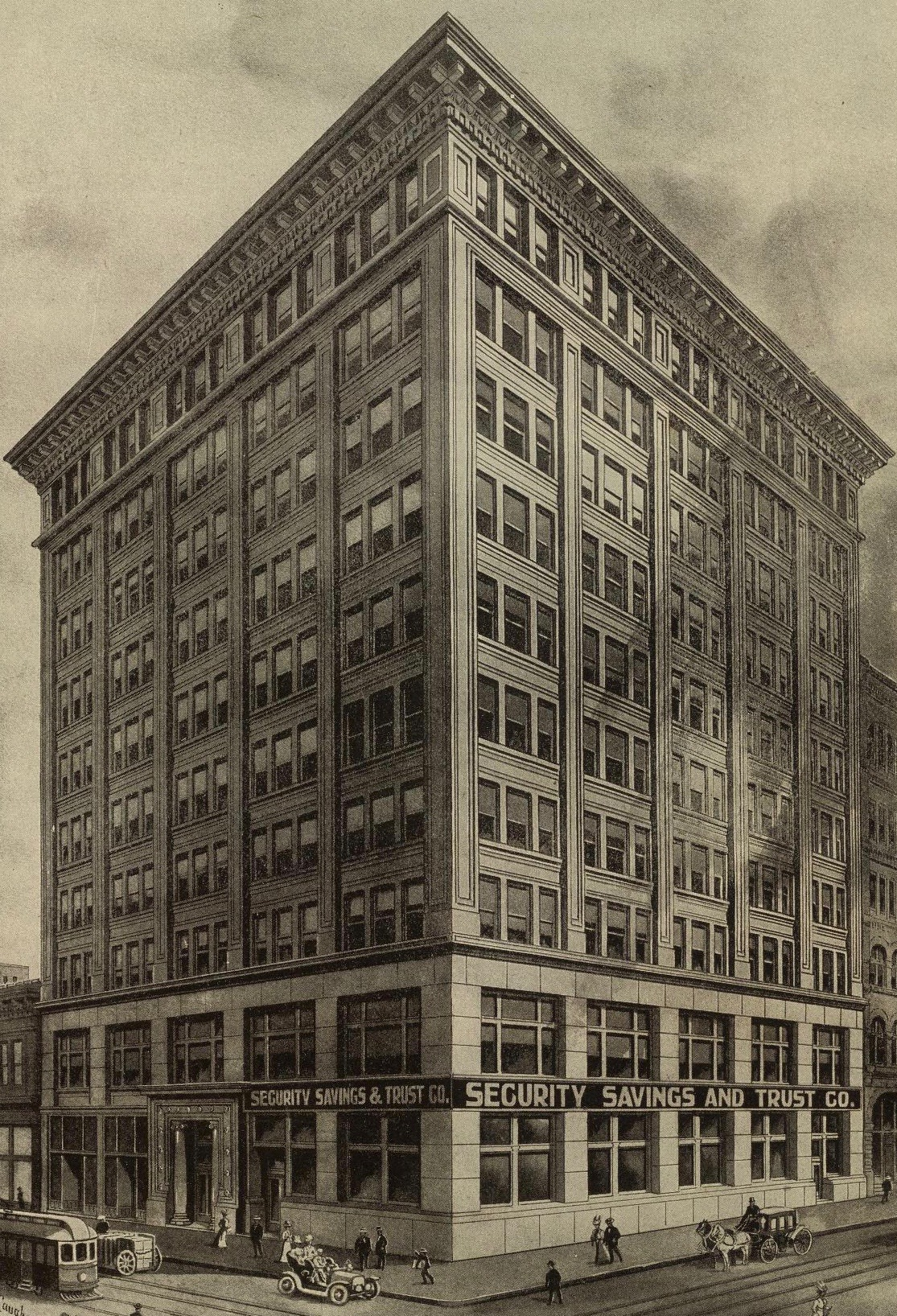
The Corbett Building Built by the Corbett brothers in Portland, Oregon in 1907. (David Rumsey Map Collection)

In addition to the buildings that their grandfather Henry W. Corbett built and left in the estate, most of them on a smaller scale, the three Corbett brothers through the Corbett Investment Company built and owned a number of additional downtown buildings. Among them were:

=== The Corbett Building ===
The Corbett Building, located at Southwest Fifth Avenue and Morrison, Portland Oregon (its mailing address was simply the Corbett Building, Portland, Oregon). The ten-story building was designed by Whidden & Lewis and completed in 1907. It "represented the arrival of the modern steel-framed skyscraper to Portland." The offices of the Corbett brothers were on the 10th floor. Their grandfather Henry W. Corbett's Multnomah Building occupied the site previously. The Corbett Building was demolished by implosion in 1988, after the three brothers' deaths, to make way for Pioneer Place. It had been sold earlier by them on their retirement from building ownership in 1956.

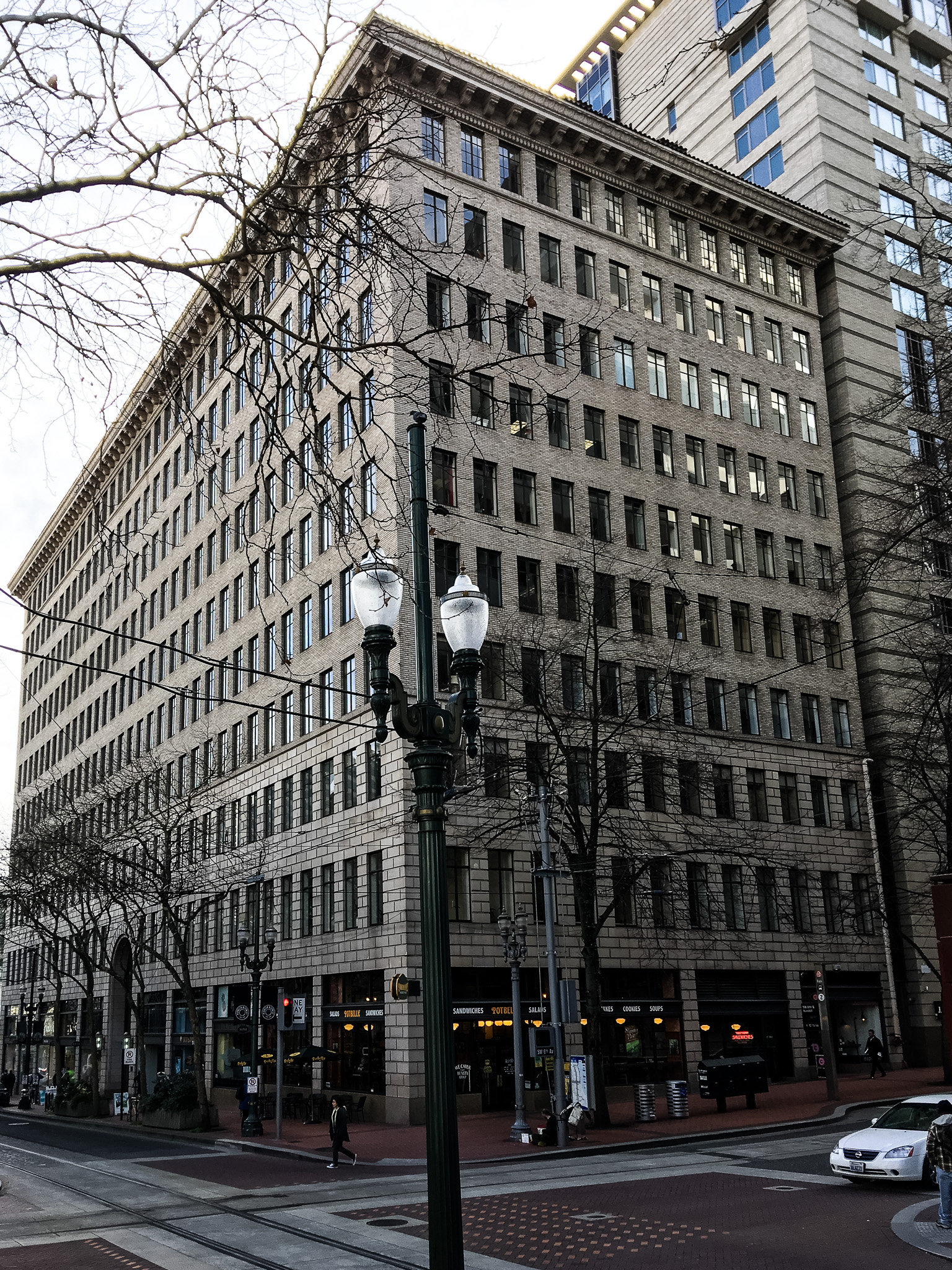
The Pacific Building Built by the Corbett brothers in Portland, Oregon in 1925. (Michael Marlitt photo 2018)

=== The Pacific Building ===
The Pacific Building, located at 520 SW Yamhill. Portland Oregon. The ten-story building was completed in 1925. The architect was A.E. Doyle and Associates. A young Pietro Belluschi worked on its design, and later had the opportunity to work there when Doyle moved the firm to the building. The Pacific building was built on the landscaped grounds on northern half of the downtown block of the H. W. Corbett mansion where a number of eastern hardwood trees had stood opposite the present Pioneer Courthouse. Here his widow, Mrs. Corbett, continued to live and grazed her cow for fresh milk. The Pacific Building had the first underground parking garage in Portland that utilised unseen almost the entire block although the Pacific Building only utilises about half the block. The garage then extended beneath the reduced grounds of the H.W. Corbett mansion which previously occupied the entire block bounded by Taylor, 5th Avenue, Yamhill and Sixth Avenues. After the Pacific Building's erection, the house, coach house and garden sat adjacent to the south. It was still the residence of his widow Emma and she remained here until her death in 1936. The Pacific Building is now listed on The National Register of Historic Places.

=== The Corbett Brothers Auto Storage Garage ===
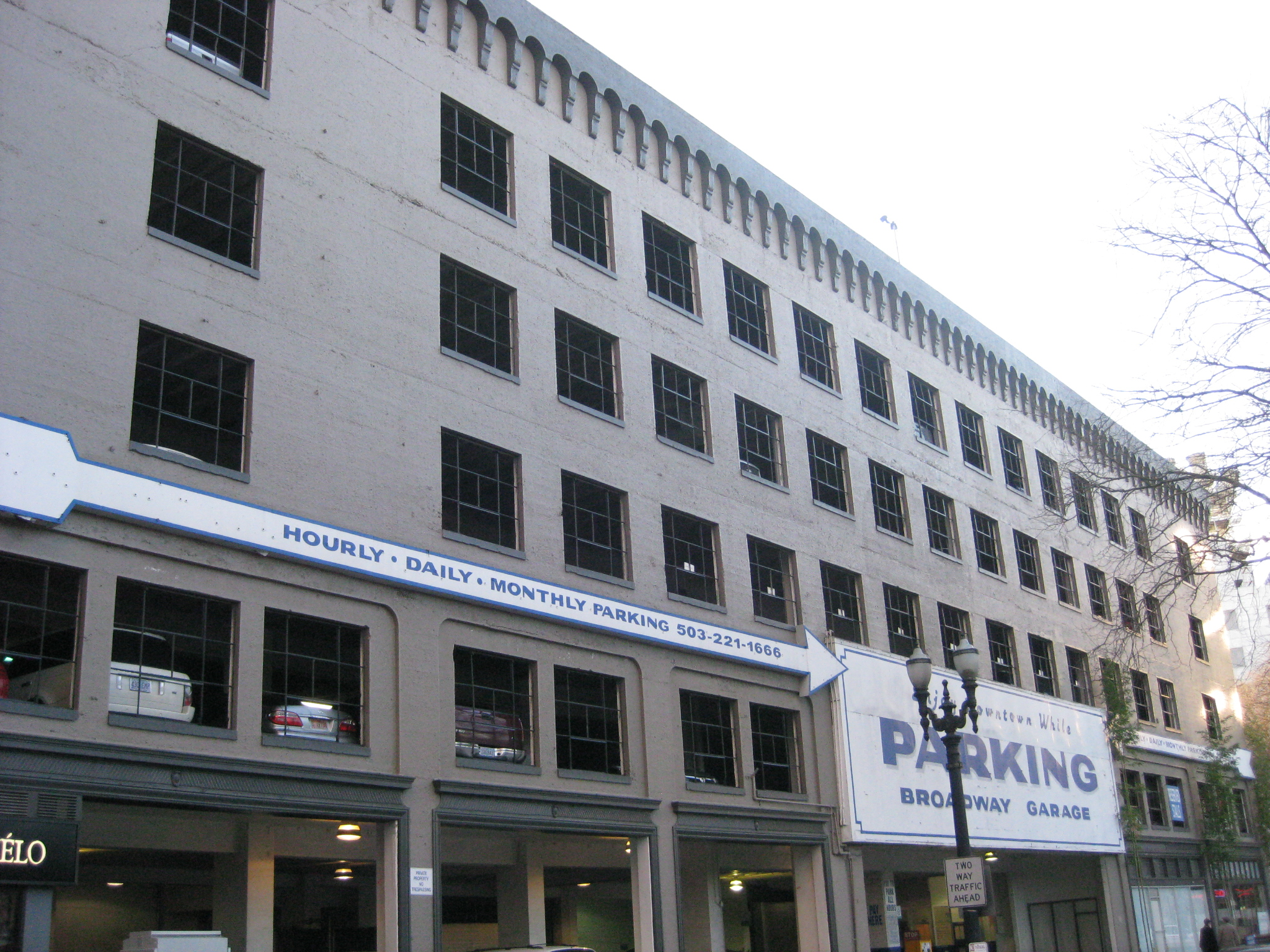
Corbett Brothers Auto Storage Garage Portland

The Corbett Brothers Auto Storage Garage (Broadway Garage), designed by A. E. Doyle. Completed in 1925. It was Portland's first self-service ramp garage. Access was off Pine Street. Store fronts were located on Sixth, Broadway and Pine. It is built in reinforced concrete. Alterations were made for the Corbetts by Pietro Belluschi in 1948. Listed on The National Register of Historic Places.

In November 1956 the brothers began their transition into retirement. These buildings in addition to the other Corbett holdings were sold.

== Other business involvements ==
Elliott Corbett served on the Board of the Livestock State Bank (1914–1918), the Portland Home Telephone Company (1911–1918) and the American Mail Line (1947–1953) amongst others. He was President (1942–1943) and Trustee of the Portland Association of Building Owners and Managers.

== The P Ranch ==
In 1906, Charles Erskine Scott Wood, Corbett's grandfather's former lawyer, advised them that the heirs of French-Glenn Livestock Company which then owned the Ranch were interested in selling. Wood became a minority partner with the Corbett brothers in the sale and he represented the Corbett brothers during the acquisition.

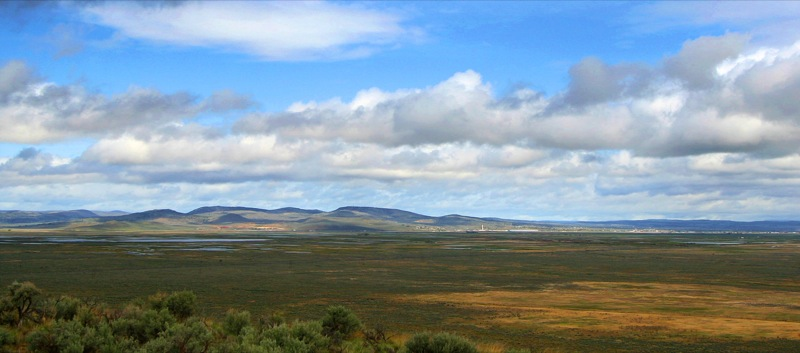
The Harney country of the P Ranch

In 1906, when the Corbett brothers purchased it, the ranch was no longer a going concern as all the cattle had previously been sold. It was renamed the Blitzen Valley Land Company. Bill Hanley, an owner of ranches in the area, was appointed their manager. He was someone they had known from their boyhood there. Their aim was to restore it to a successful working ranch but the Blitzen Valley Land Company had first to improve the distribution of the water resources in the valley. They soon had increasing numbers of cattle on the range again. Between 1907 and 1913 the company built 17 and a half miles of new channels from the Donner and Blitzen Rivers in order to improve drainage of the wetlands. They also authorised construction of eight miles of the Busse Ditch and four miles of the Stubblefield Ditch to improve water distribution in the north end of the valley.

In 1916 the Corbetts reorganised the operation as the Eastern Oregon Livestock Company (EOLC) and sold about 40 percent of it to Louis Swift, the owner of the Chicago meat packing company Swift & Company (later to become the largest beef processing company in the world). The Eastern Oregon Livestock Company's P Ranch then ran about 20,000 head of cattle but probably through lack of hay or other reasons they had heavy losses of cattle numbers in the next two years.

In 1917 the Corbetts' and Swift's Eastern Oregon Livestock Company began the operation of their Harney Valley Railroad Company to transport its livestock out of the ranch with Henry L. Corbett becoming the railway's president.

In 1918 the company constructed an irrigation ditch along the west side of the valley.

In 1924 the Eastern Oregon Livestock Company built the Frenchglen Hotel about a mile away from the ranch house for cattle buyers and others having business with the ranch, as the nearest settlement was at Burns, Oregon, over sixty miles away.

In 1928 the Corbett brothers sold Swift all their remaining controlling shares in the EOLC company. This was twenty-two years after their original investment and the brothers were apparently relieved to dispose of their remaining shares in the company to Swift as by then it was a losing proposition. Even the Swifts, as leading meatpackers, found it difficult to run profitably from 1928 until 1935 when they finally sold it to the US Government.

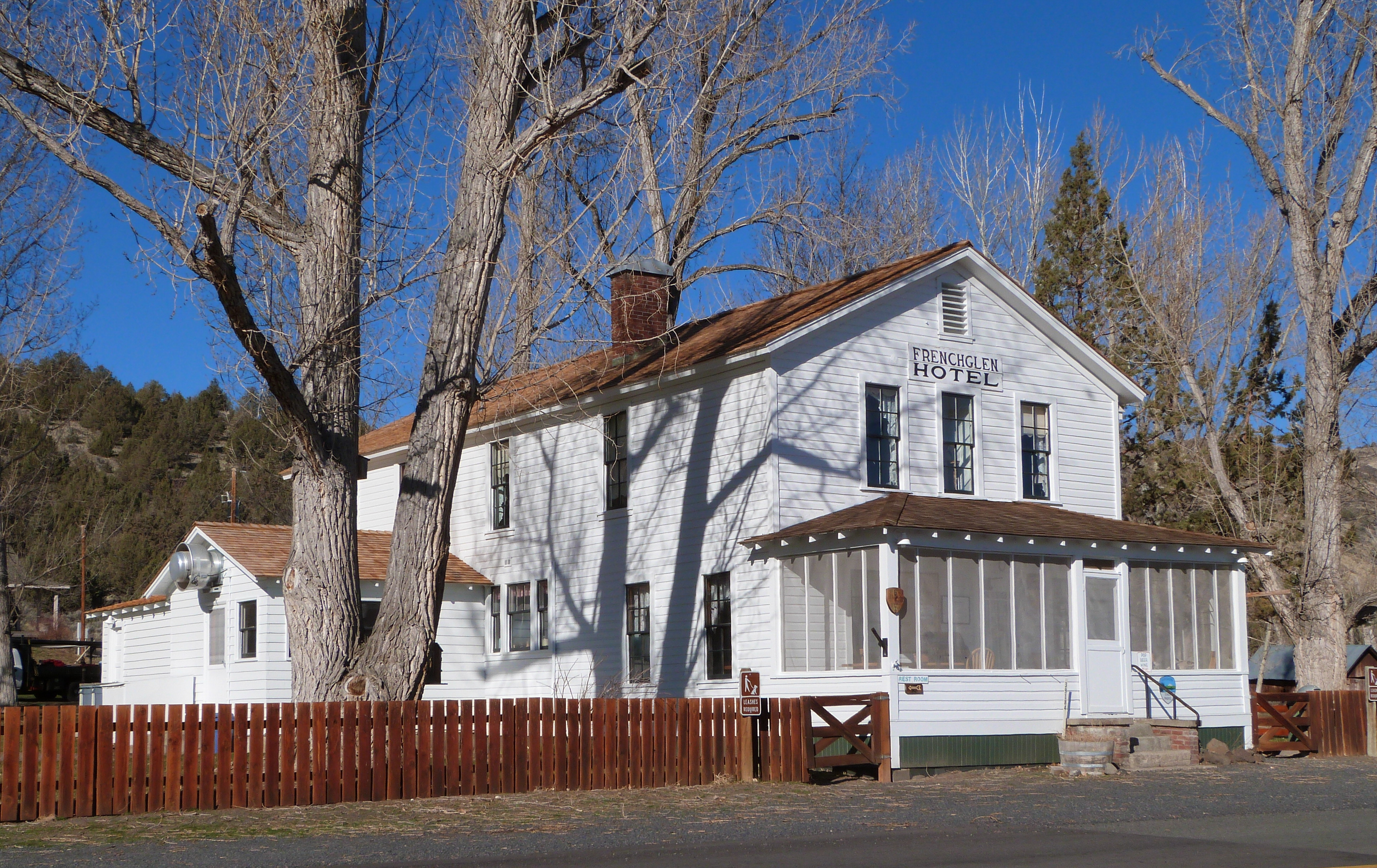
The Frenchglen Hotel that the Corbetts' Eastern Oregon Livestock Company built at the P Ranch. (Photo: Ian Pellet)

The P Ranch was sold to the Federal government because the government needed the Blitzen Valley water rights to protect water levels on the Malheur Lake Bird Reservation. A part of the property is now the Malheur National Wildlife Refuge and the rest is managed by the United States Fish and Wildlife Service. Some of the remaining P Ranch Buildings (the main ranch house burned down in 1947), the Long Barn, French's Round Barn (for training horses) and the Beef Wheel and the Frenchglen Hotel are now listed on the National Register of Historic Places.

The investment had always been one of the Corbetts' less fortunate undertakings. It proved too large to manage effectively in those days with poor communications, especially by absentee landlords. When Elliott Corbett was asked if he had appreciated owning this childhood haunt, he replied that while he had enjoyed the place as boy, as an owner it had been a constant financial drain on him and he was glad to unload it to the Swifts. It was a costly early lesson to the brothers who never again invested in ventures in which they had an emotional attachment, nor in enterprises that they were not able to oversee directly.

== Public service and charitable activities ==
The Oregon Voter described his contribution: "In his long work in community and public affairs...he gave freely... of his knowledge and experience as a banker and manager of a family estate, to those charitable, philanthropic and educational institutions so that today most of them have sound budgets and practical administration procedures they might not have had but for him. ... He was kindly but firm [to others] working with him [giving] an education in what to find in a financial statement and the knack of seeing weakness and waste...in [what are] important facets of public philanthropy".

Corbett was a life member and a director of the Oregon Historical Society from 1942 until his death in 1963. He was its president when it acquired the present Park Block site.

Corbett and his two brothers donated to the Portland Art Museum a number of art works from their mother's collection of art after her death.

He was a director of the Portland Library Association from 1911 to 1918.

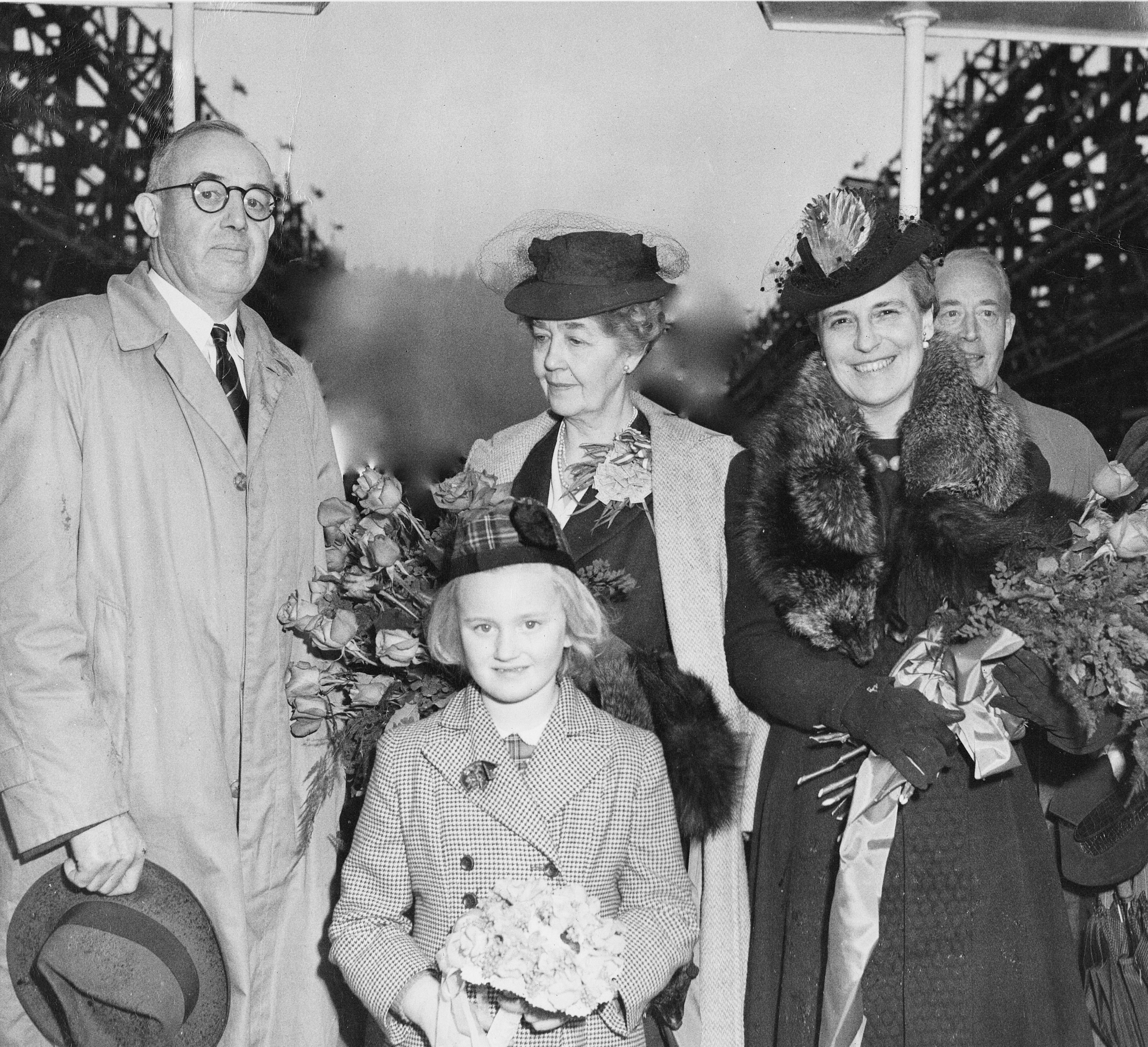
SS Henry W. Corbett Liberty ship launch 29 March 1943. L-R: Elliott R. Corbett & wife, Mrs Henry L. Corbett & husband. Elliott Corbett's granddaughter Helen Macadam, WWII British refugee. (Elliott R. Corbett Archives)

Corbett was also involved with the Portland Community Chest (later the United Way), the Oregon War Chest, the Multnomah County Relief League, the Portland Committee on War Finance,the Red Cross, and the U.S Committee for Care of European Children.

Corbett was one of those behind raising the funds for the building of Liberty ships, among them SS. Henry W. Corbett (launched 29 March 1943), SS William S. Ladd (13 September 1943), SS Henry Failing (7 April 1943) and SS Abbot L. Mills (18 October 1943) built by the Oregon Shipbuilding Corporation.

=== Clubs ===
Corbett had life membership in: the Arlington Club (past President), The University Club, the Multnomah Athletic Club (all in Portland) and the Harvard Club (New York). and the Deschutes Fishing Club in Oregon.

== Marriage to Alta Rittenhouse Smith ==
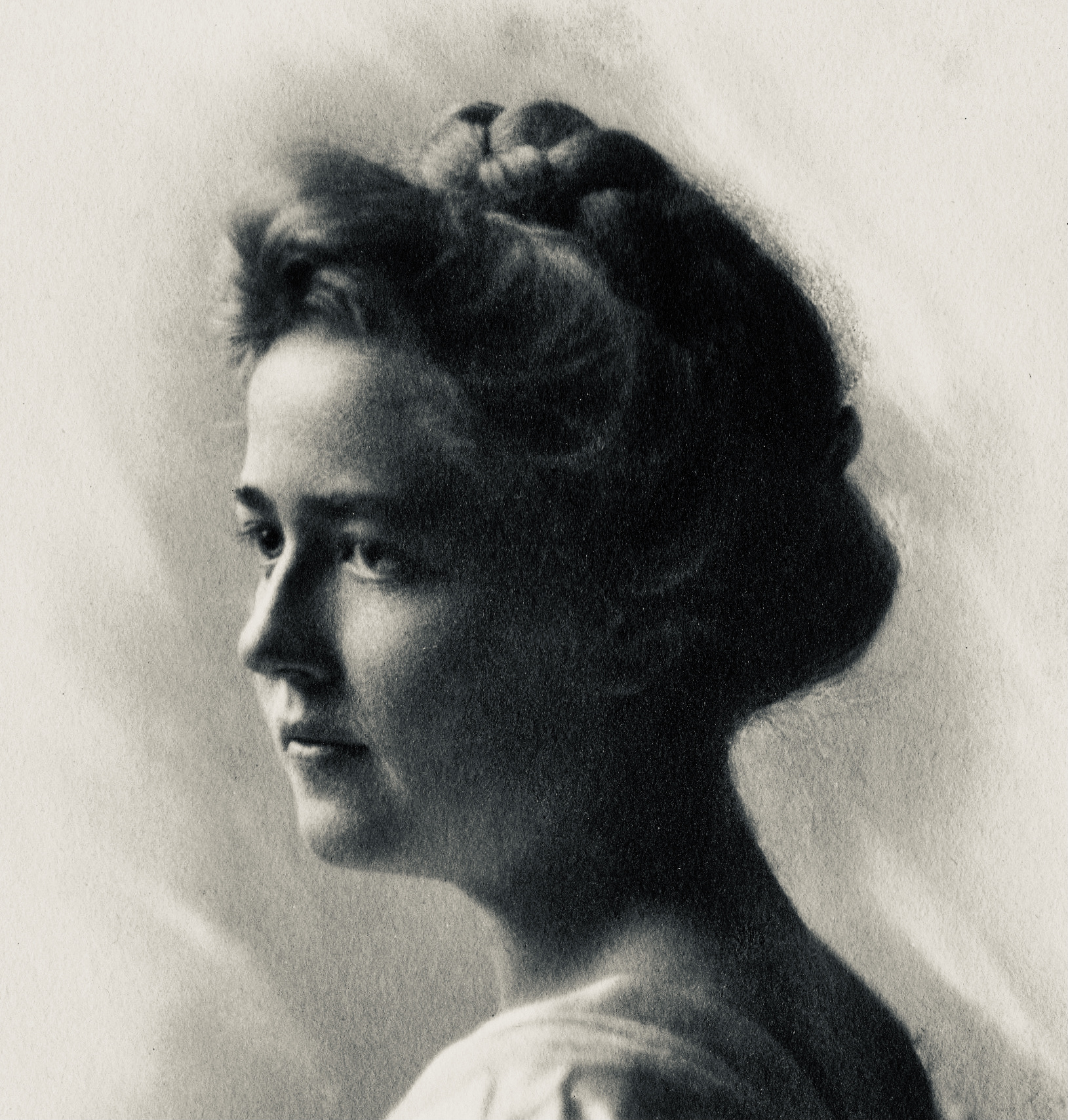
Alta S. Corbett circa 1912 (Elliott R. Corbett Archives)

Elliott Corbett and Alta Rittenhouse Smith married in Portland on September 1, 1909. She was born on June 10, 1886 in Portland, Oregon, and died on September 9, 1976 in Portland, aged 90. She was the daughter of Albert T. Smith (1833-1913) and Laura Rittenhouse (1852-1928) who moved to Portland in 1870. They built the first house in Portland Heights at what is now SW Carter Lane and Vista Avenue and gave Portland Heights its name (after their house The Heights).

Alta graduated from the Portland Academy in 1904 and was a 1908 honors graduate and Senior Councillor of Smith College at Northampton, Massachusetts. After graduation and before her marriage, she became a teacher. That was an early manifestation of her life-long interest in education and to furthering women's and civil rights.

=== Role in obtaining the right for women to vote ===
Alta was supported by her husband as a leading Oregon suffragette and she was president of the Oregon Equal Suffrage Alliance during the two years before the ratification of the 19th Amendment to the United States Constitution in obtaining women's equal suffrage that guaranteed all women the right to vote. It had been passed by Congress on June 4, 1919, but this then had to be submitted for ratification by three quarters of the states to secure adoption to become part of the United States Constitution. The Amendment was the culmination of a decades-long movement for women's suffrage in the United States, at both the state and national levels.
Mrs. Corbett had called a large meeting of the Alliance at the Multnomah Hotel in Portland on November 7, 1919, with representation from throughout the state at which leading US suffragette Carrie Chapman Catt spoke. It was agreed at the meeting that the Oregon Equal Suffrage Alliance rather than Mrs. Catt's National League of Women Voters and supported by Mrs. Catt that the Alliance's president "Mrs. Elliott Corbett call a meeting ... to draft an appeal to the legislators to urge a special session" [of the Oregon legislature]. Mrs Corbett with two other women, Effie Comstock Simmons (Mrs. C.B. Simmons) and Grace Harbison Torrey (Mrs. Harry Beal Torrey), of Portland met Governor Olcott and his executive on November 28, 1919. Mrs. Corbett, who acted as spokesman for the delegation, urged the governor to call a special session as until then he had been reluctant to do so. Mrs Corbett: "We feel that Oregon's influence is needed in the event that the so-called doubtful states are to ratify..." To that end the Alliance would welcome a special session of the legislature to ratify. If the expense of this was an objection of the Governor, Mrs. Corbett said that the women of the state stood ready to bear the expense of gathering the lawmakers. The governor responded that if the legislators asked for a special session, agreed to waive the per diem and mileage and confine their work to the Amendment he would call a special session. [In the event the women's offer to cover the costs did not prove necessary as the Alliance contacted all the legislators and they agreed to call for a special session and waive all expenses to vote on the Amendment].
The Oregon legislature in special session voted to ratify the 19 Amendment a few weeks later on January 12, 1920, and on January 14, 1920, the resolution was filed by the Oregon Secretary of State and Oregon became the 25th state to ratify. After the required 36 states (3/4 of the then 48 states) had voted in the affirmative the Amendment was ratified by the US Congress on August 18, 1920, and the 19th Amendment then became part of the U.S. Constitution guaranteeing all women equal suffrage giving them the right to vote throughout the United States.

=== Her involvement in civic and educational causes ===
Alta was also supported by her husband in her involvement in her many civic and educational roles. She was involved in women's campaigns with the Portland Equal Suffrage League, Oregon Equal Suffrage Alliance, the League of Women Voters, Urban League of Portland, the Portland Women's Union, the Girl Scouts, as well as educational institutions and the Oregon Historical Society.

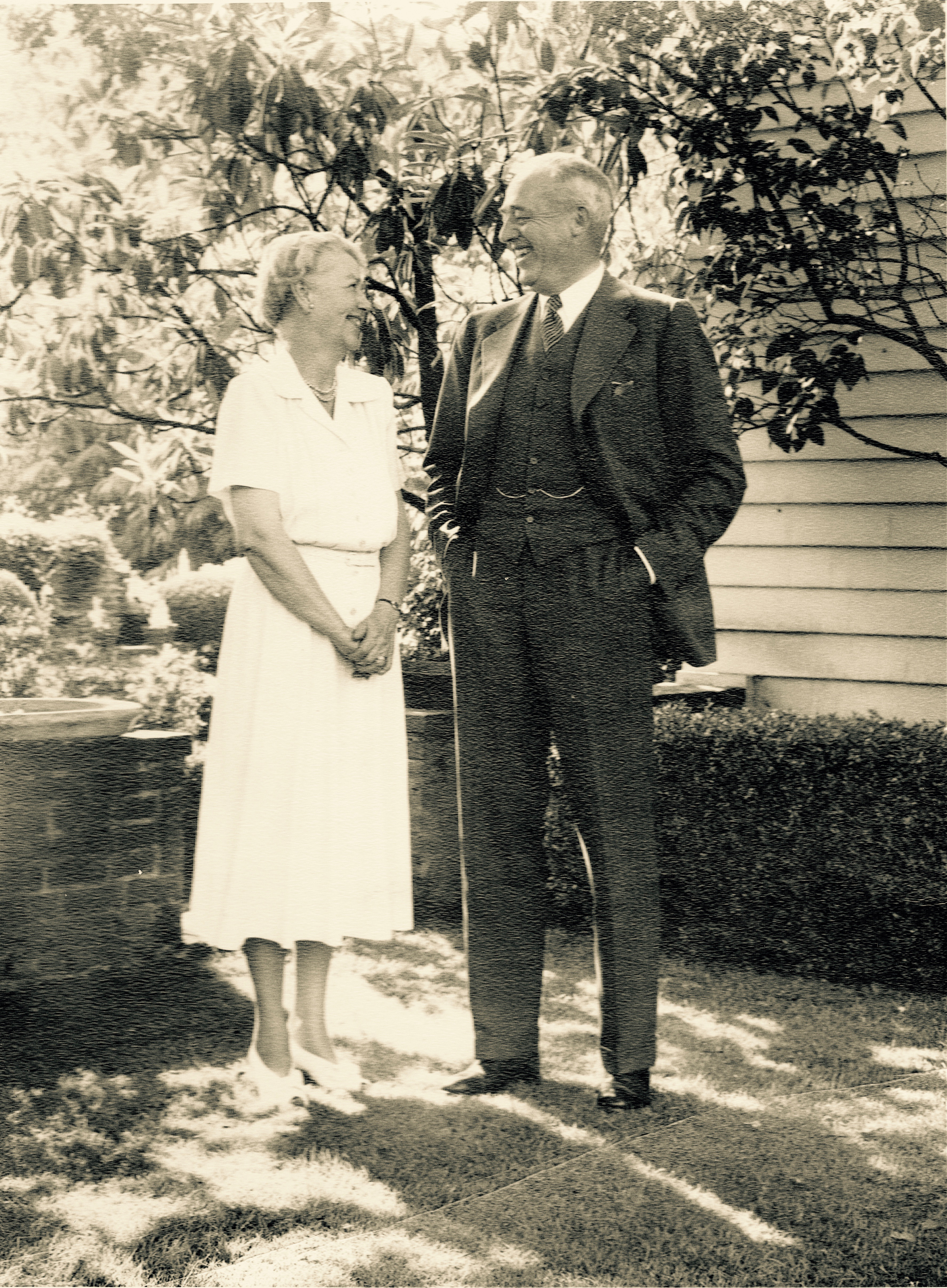
Elliott and Alta Corbett in their garden (Elliott R. Corbett Archives)

She was appointed by Eleanor Roosevelt in 1933 as the Oregon representative to the national Community Chest, the forerunner of the United Way, during the Great Depression.

Alta was on the board for Riverdale High School from 1915-1930. She was a trustee for Smith College from 1931-1939 and for Catlin Gabel School from 1949-1951. She was also a regent for Reed College from 1919-1941 and a trustee from 1931-1934. The Alta S. Corbett Lectureship Fund at Reed College was established through a donation by her daughters the year after her death in 1976 and continues to support symposiums, lectures, grants and collective research fellowships. (and in the 2020s is having its mandate widened with further financial donations). The Alta S. Corbett Grants for Research in Political Science at Reed College was also created in her name.

The Oregon State Song "Oregon, My Oregon", composed by Henry B. Murtagh with lyrics by John Andrew Buchanan, was chosen from 212 submissions by a committee of five of which she was one of the members and designated by the Oregon Legislature as the state song in 1927.

== Daughters ==
Elliott and Alta had five daughters who they brought up with the aid of Nurse Cochrane:

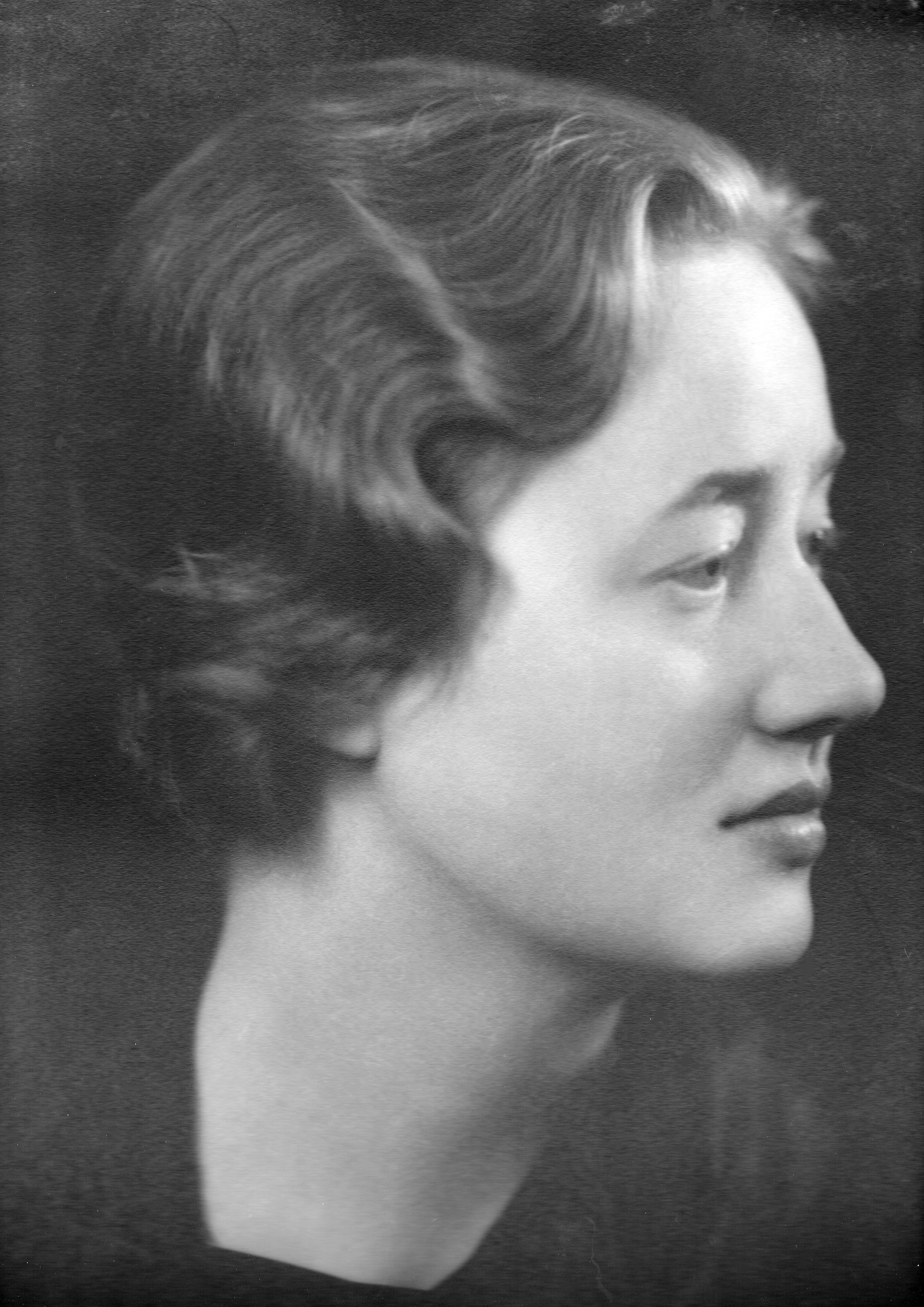
Caroline Ladd Corbett

=== Caroline Ladd Corbett ===
Caroline was born on September 20, 1910 in Portland, and she died on August 28, 1989 (aged 79) at East Runton, Norfolk, UK. She attended Riverdale School and Miss Catlin's School (now Catlin Gabel School) in Portland and Smith College, Massachusetts. After graduating Cum Laude, she worked as the personal assistant to the US Secretary of State, Henry L. Stimson before her marriage to Ivison Macadam (1894-1974), Director General of the Royal Institute of International Affairs (Chatham House) in St James's Square, London, UK. They married on January 1, 1934 in Dunthorpe, Portland, Oregon and lived in London and at Runton Old Hall, East Runton, Norfolk, UK. They had four children: Helen Ivison Taylor, William Ivison Macadam, Elliott Corbett Macadam and Caroline Alta Macadam Colacicchi.

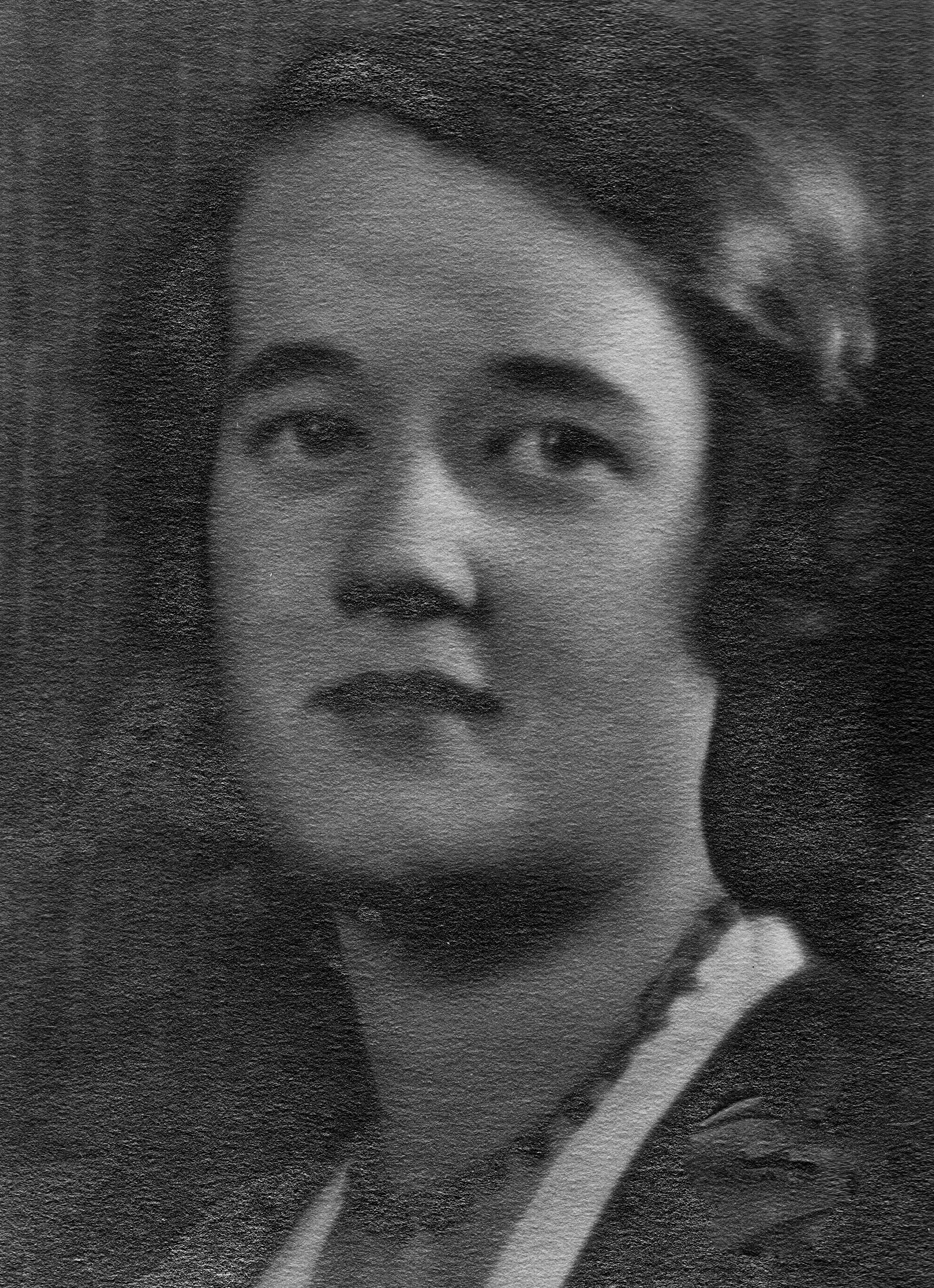
Gretchen (Day) Corbett

=== Gretchen (Day) Corbett ===
Gretchen was born on November 2, 1912 in Portland. She died on October 10, 2004 (aged 91). Like all her sisters, she attended Riverdale School and Miss Catlin's School (now Catlin Gabel School). She married Dr. John Poulsen Trommald in 1934 in Boston, Massachusetts. She was active in civic organizations including the Visiting Nurses Association, English Speaking Union, Oregon Historical Society and was appointed to the Executive Committee of the Citizen's Conference on Oregon Courts in 1968. Active in Republican Party politics, she was an Oregon delegate to the 1960 Republican National Convention. She was involved in the creation of the Oregon Women's Division of the Nixon-Agnew Campaign Committee in 1968. They had four children, John Poulsen Trommald, Elliott Corbett Trommald, Susan Trommald Roff and Peter Gunder Trommald.

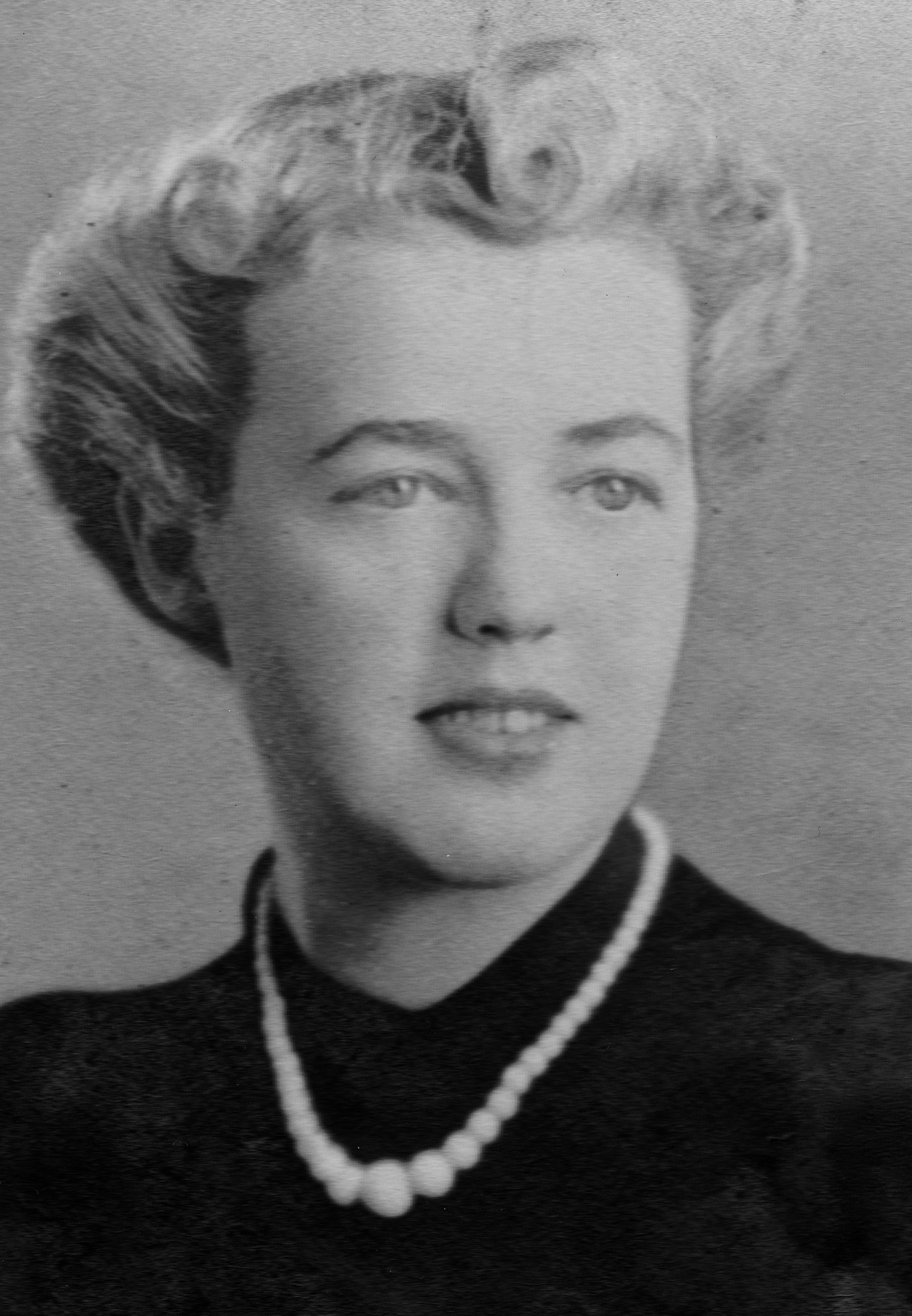
Lesley (Judy) Corbett

=== Lesley (Judy) Corbett ===
Lesley was born on April 13, 1915 in Dunthorpe, Portland. She died on November 5, 2013, (aged 98) in Portland. She attended Riverdale School, Miss Catlin's School (now Catlin Gabel School), Portland, the Branson School, Ross, California and Smith College, Massachusetts. She married Dr. Donald Forster on September 16, 1939. She was like her husband a fly fisher. Active in the Portland Community, she served on the Board of Trustees of Reed College, the Parry Centre, Oregon Museum of Science and Industry (OMSI), and the Board of Riverdale School. She was an active supporter of the Portland Art Museum, the Oregon Historical Society, Smith College, Catlin Gabel School and the League of Women Voters. They had four children, Dale Edward Forster, Robert Douglas Forster, William Lloyd Forster and Helen Forster Chapman.

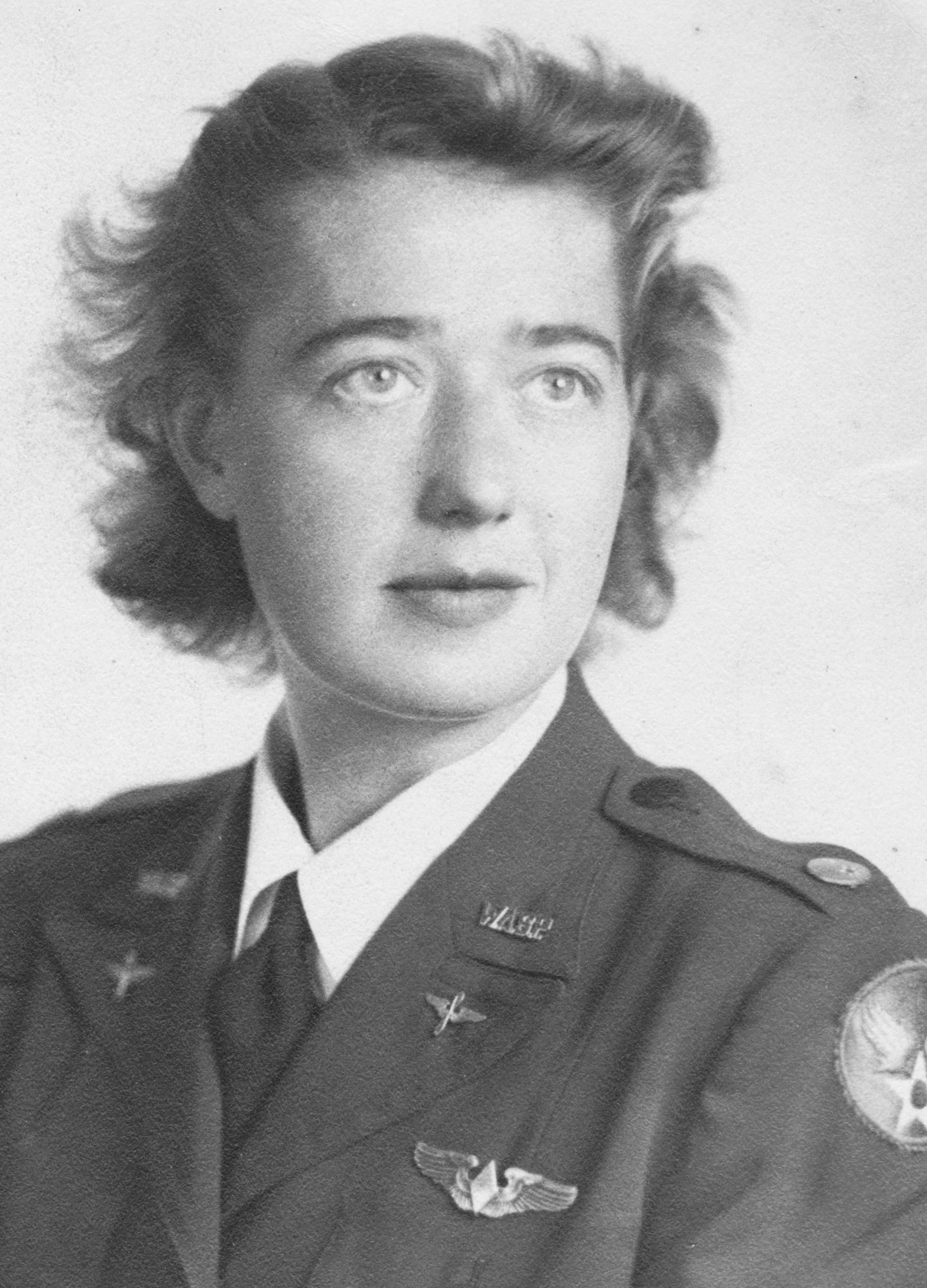
Alta (Teta) Corbett

=== Alta (Teta) Corbett ===
Born May 26, 1918 in Dunthorpe, Portland, Alta died on August 28, 2017 (aged 99) at Sequim, Washington. She attended Riverdale School, and Smith College. Nature was important in her life. She was a horseback rider, fly fisher and poet. In her early twenties she made solo ascents of the Pacific Northwest's mountains, Mount Rainier, Mount Hood, Mount Adams, the Three Sisters and Mount St. Helens. During World War II, she first worked in the US War Department for Air Branch G-2 and on its formation she transferred to the Women Airforce Service Pilots, the WASP, where she flew as a Squadron Leader. She married Ralph Russell Thomas on June 8, 1961 in Portland. Later, they self built a house and farm in Sequim, Washington, on the Olympic Peninsula. In 2010, the WASP were recognised for service during WWII, and at 92, she was awarded the Congressional Gold Medal in Washington, D.C. They had two daughters Deborah Thomas McGoff and Caroline (Kelly) Ladd Thomas.

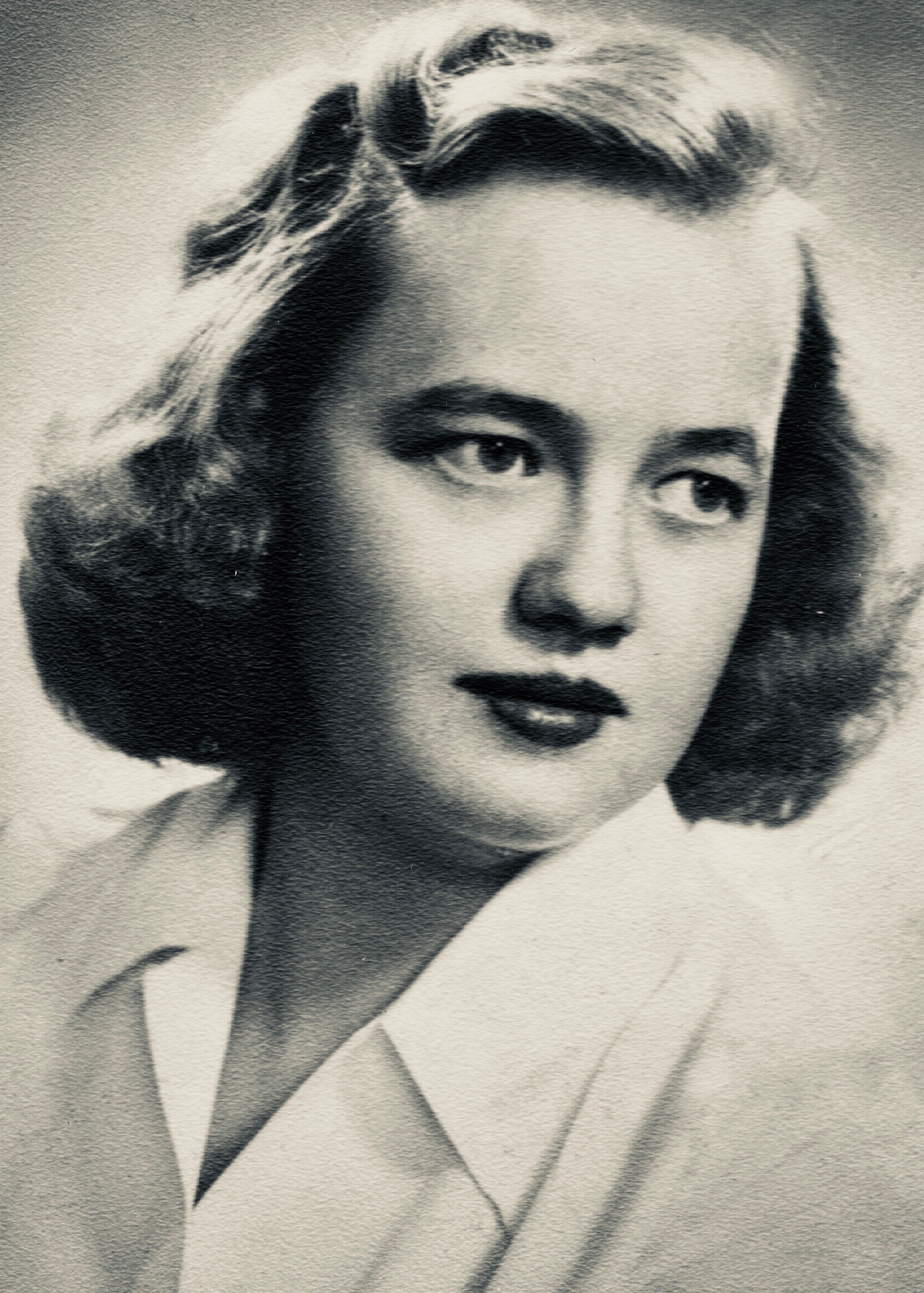
Lucy Elliott Corbett

=== Lucy Elliott Corbett ===
Lucy was born March 16, 1922 in Dunthorpe, Portland. She died on 23 October 2007 aged 85 in Portland. She attended Riverdale School, and Scripps College, Claremont, California. She married Richard J. Marlitt on September 16, 1955, in Portland, Oregon. Lucy served in the Red Cross during World War II and during the reconstruction of Germany afterwards. She was a generous donor to the Portland Art Museum of the works she and her husband had collected by the American Ashcan School and American Impressionism School of painters. She was a board member and active supporter of various other social and cultural organisations including the Portland Art Museum, the Oregon Historical Society and many others. They had two sons: Thomas Corbett Marlitt and Michael Ladd Marlitt.

== Legacy ==
Elliott's brother Henry L. Corbett named his youngest son after him, Elliott Ruggles Corbett II (1922-1944). He was killed in action, aged 22, during the Allied liberation of Europe in WWII a few months before the end of hostilities. His parents donated the Elliott Corbett Memorial State Recreation Site in their son's memory.

Elliott also had two grandsons named after him, Elliott Corbett Trommald and Elliott Corbett Macadam.

The Reed College Elliott R. Corbett Loan Fund was established in his memory in 1963 as a financial aid program for students to have access to loans when needed.

The Elliott R. Corbett Chart Room is part of The Oregon Historical Society's Library and Archives and was created as part of a donation in his memory when their present building was being built.

== Recreations ==
Elliott, along with his brothers, was a football player at Harvard University and at the Multnomah Athletic Club in his younger years. He was also a good horseman and polo player in Oregon. He was a keen fly fisherman and keen duck and quail hunter and excellent shot both with a shotgun, rifle and revolver. He and his wife took their family on camping trips with packhorse trains in the Oregon mountains. They also had a motor vessel, the Widgeon, in their younger years in which they sailed up the Pacific Coast with their friends and elder daughters and into the British Columbia inlets for the salmon fishing. Elliott was a regular Steelhead fisherman on the Deschutes River and others.

== Residences ==
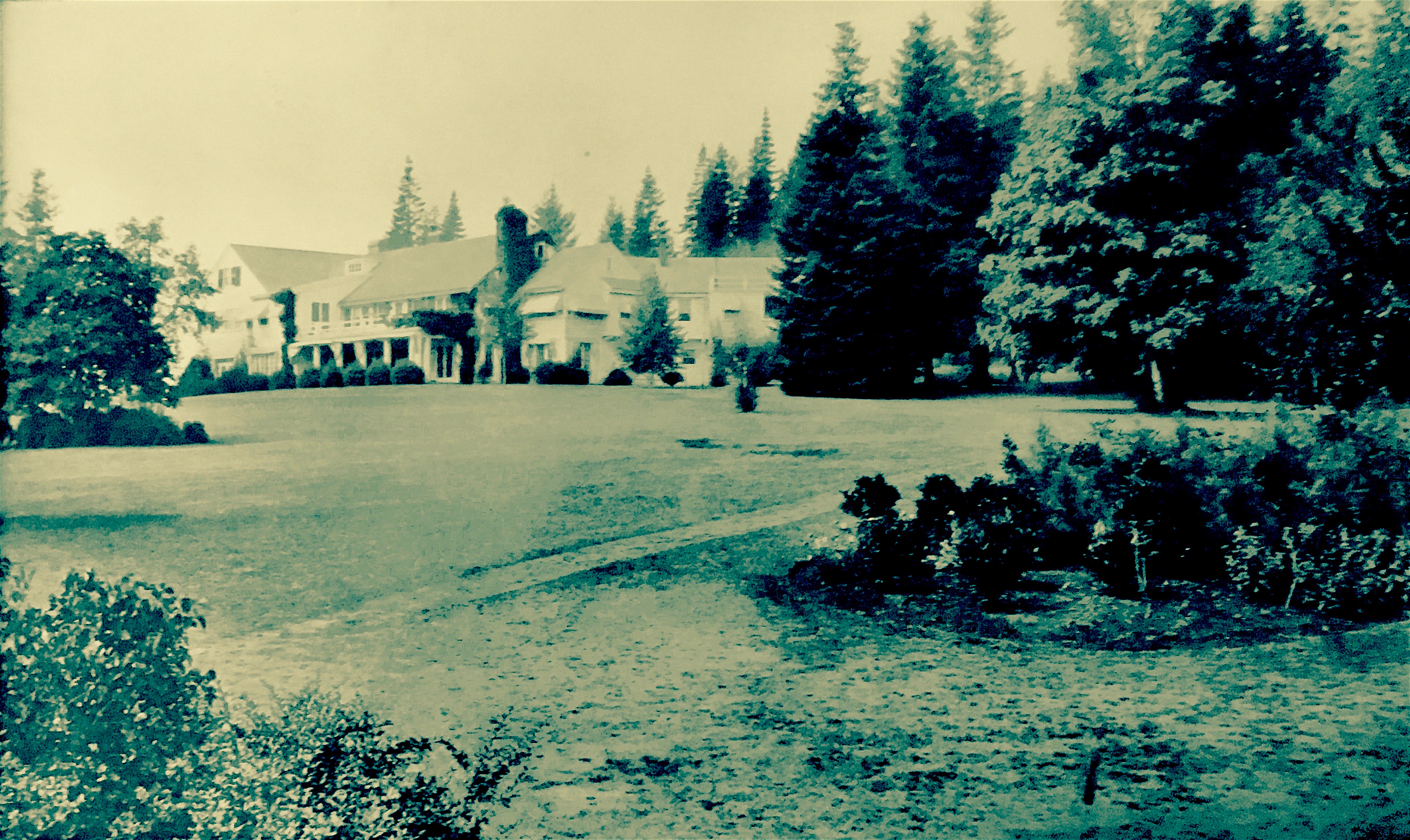
Elliott R. Corbett Dunthorpe house in 1915 from the SE. (Elliott R. Corbett Archives)

After their marriage Elliott Corbett and his wife lived in the Park Blocks at 243 W. Park Avenue Portland, now 1119 SW Park, formerly the W. M. Ladd residence. There Elliott Corbett and his brother Henry L. Corbett had adjoining properties. The sites of the two houses occupied the block that is now the location of the Portland Art Museum Mark Building across from the Oregon Historical Society Building. The Elliott Corbetts' first three daughters were born there.

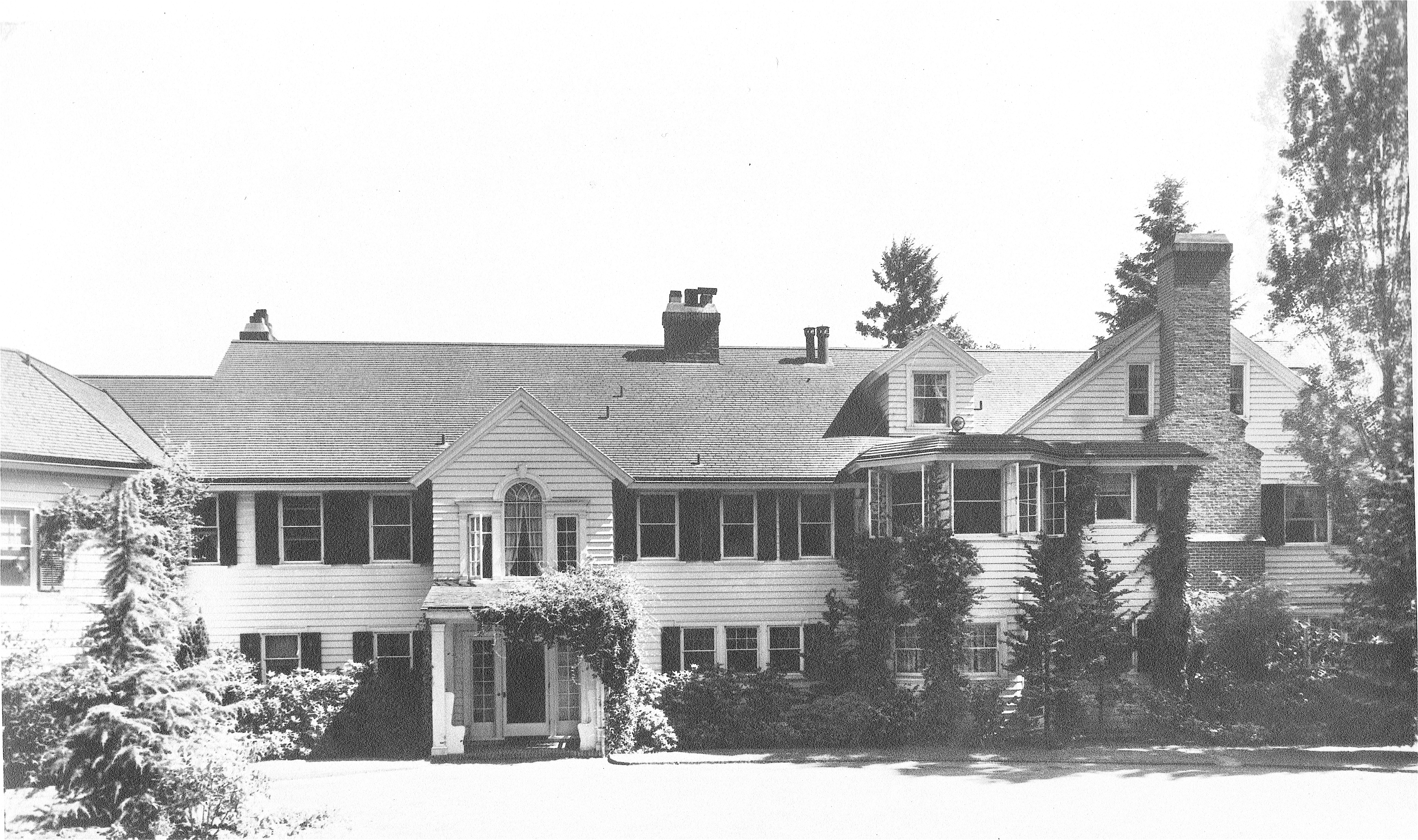
Elliott R. Corbett Dunthorpe house north front 1915. In 1939 Elliott took off chimney & west end to right & third floor above. (Elliott R. Corbett Archives)

Elliott and Alta Corbett then were intent on a move from the busy downtown area. Elliott and his brother Henry. L. Corbett commissioned A. E. Doyle and Associates to design two houses with adjoining grounds on six acres in Portland Heights which ultimately were never built.

Elliott Corbett and his wife in 1913 embarked on the building of a "country cottage" in what became the Dunthorpe area that was about to be opened up for development near Lake Oswego. While doing so the Corbetts decided to make the "cottage" at 01600 SW Greenwood Road in Dunthorpe, their main residence so their children could grow up in a semi-rural environment. It was completed in the fall of 1915 and the 32 year old Elliott Corbett and his 29 year old wife Alta moved there with their then three daughters in time for Thanksgiving. It was the first house to be built in the new area of Dunthorpe.

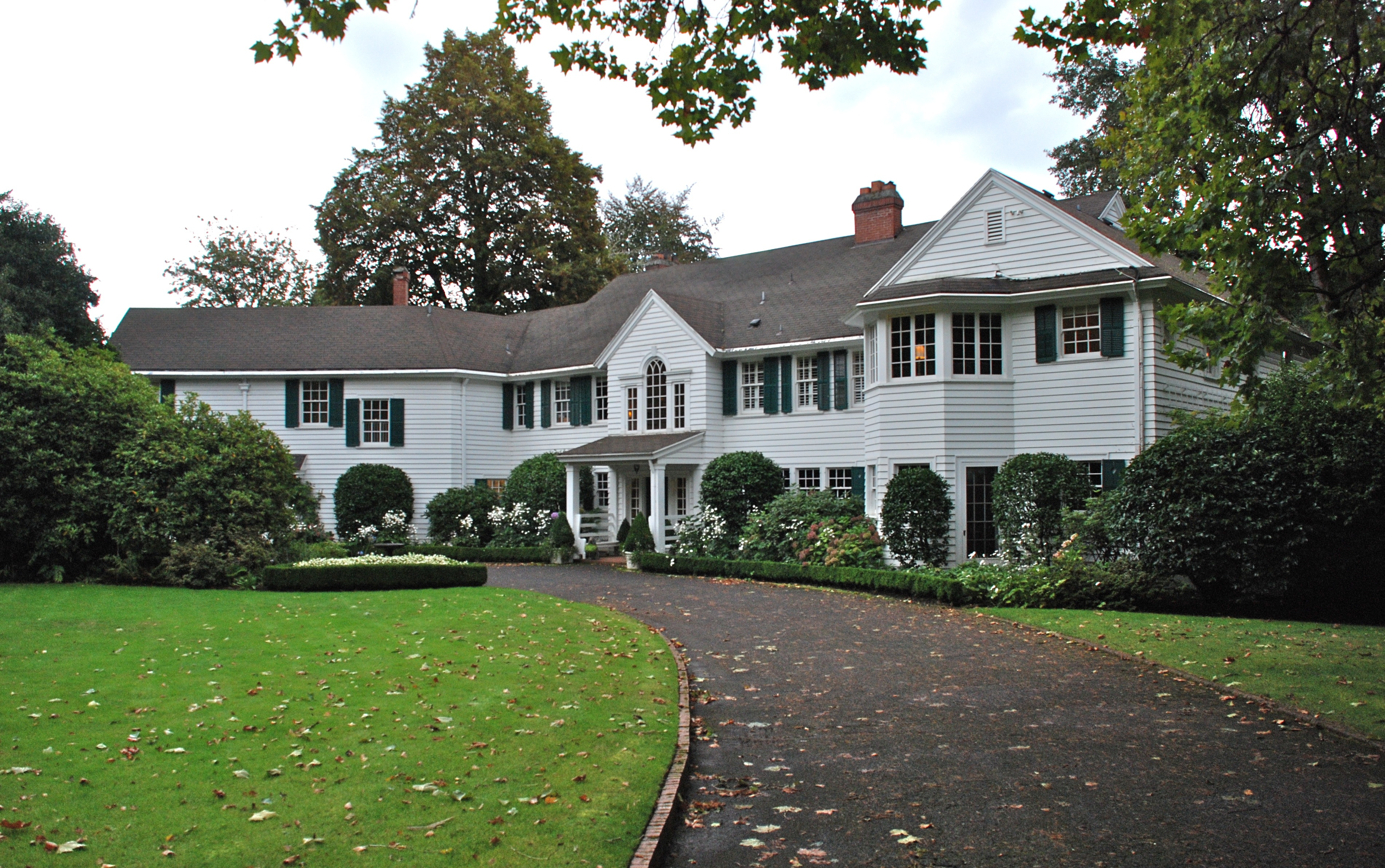
Elliott R. Corbett House present front externally same as after the 1939 alterations.(NRHP) (Photo: Steve Morgan)

The Elliott Corbett property was set in 32 acres containing a two-story three-bay car garage with an under-car mechanic's well and workshop and staff quarters above, a separate barn and stables for their riding horses and groom's quarters (both entered by a side drive off the main circular one), a gardener's cottage adjacent to SW Iron Mountain Road (now Blvd.), a pair of tennis courts, a swimming pool and a children's "Swings and Rings" play area, all at a distance from the main house and mostly not within sight of it.

Many of their Portland friends thought it was an unwise move but Elliott's brother Henry Ladd Corbett decided to follow suit and soon many of the leading Portland families had decided to build their homes there. An area which used to seem quite a distance from Portland became a pleasant area to bring up large families.

The Elliott Corbett's five daughters were brought up there. After the three eldest were married and the two younger were away at College, Elliott took off part of the west end in 1939, including the large formal living room, and the second and third floor above it to make the house more compact for their smaller family then living there and created a new formal West walled garden for his wife on the former larger West wing foundation.

The Elliott R. Corbett House is now listed on the National Register of Historic Places and its front appears today as it looked after Corbett made the modifications.

Elliott and Alta also had a beach house on the Oregon Coast at Gearhart, Oregon, and in later years, after giving that to their children and their families, had a smaller beach house on the sand dunes at Surf Pines, Oregon, north of Gearhart.

Elliott and his son-in-law Dr. Donald Forster also built the Don Elliott fishing cabin on the Deschutes River in eastern Oregon.
