= Alta Corbett Thomas =

American pilot (1918–2017)

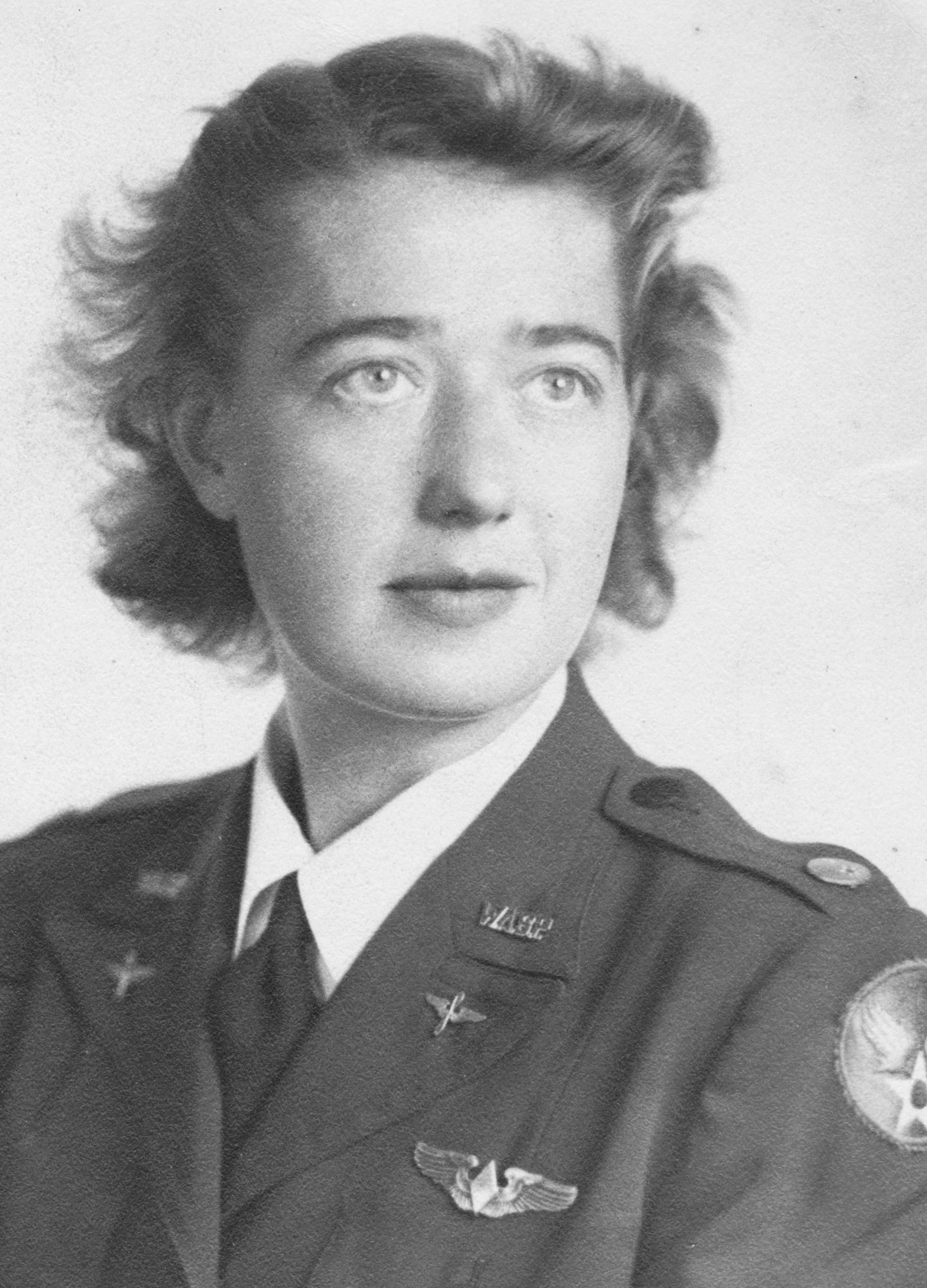
- Alta Corbett Thomas in her WASP uniform.
- Born: May 26, 1918
- Died: August 28, 2017 (aged 99)
- Education: Smith College
- Occupation: Pilot

Alta "Teta" Corbett Thomas (May 26, 1918 – August 28, 2017) was an American pilot for the Women Airforce Service Pilots, class 43-W-4. She was the fourth of five daughters born to Elliott R. and Alta S. Corbett in Portland, Oregon.

== Youth and education ==
She attended Riverdale High School (Portland, Oregon) and Smith College where she graduated with a Bachelors of Arts in History. Nature was important in her life. She was a horseback rider, fly fisher and poet. In her early twenties she made solo ascents of the Pacific Northwest's mountains, Mount Rainier, Mount Hood, Mount Adams, the Three Sisters and Mount St. Helens.

She then acquired her private and commercial pilot licenses at Swan Island Airport in Portland, Oregon.

== War service ==
During World War II, Alta first worked in the US War Department for Air Branch G-2 and on its formation she transferred to the Women Airforce Service Pilots, the WASP, in 1943 where she flew as a Squadron Leader. In the WASP Corbett would tow targets primarily at Camp Davis Anti-Aircraft Artillery Training Center in North Carolina, and later flying from Camp Stewart Anti-Aircraft Artillery Training Center Georgia which prepared anti-aircraft gunners and searchlight crews for all the wartime fronts abroad. One of her assignments at these training camps was to fly above the anti aircraft guns firing at the targets towed behind her aircraft. Corbett also participated in night flying missions to train searchlight aircrews in detecting and tracking other aircraft.

== Post-war ==
After the WASPs disbanded, Alta "Teta" Corbett was a ground to aircraft controller with the Civil Aeronautics Administration in Gustavus, Alaska after being unable to find a civilian commercial pilot's position in the then male dominated commercial airline world.

== Family ==
Alta Corbett married Ralph Russell Thomas on 8 June 1961 in Portland Oregon starting married life on the Oregon Coast. Later, they self built a house and farm in Sequim, Washington, on the Olympic Peninsula. They had two daughters Deborah Thomas McGoff and Caroline (Kelly) Ladd Thomas.

=== Awards ===
At 92 years of age, Alta Corbett Thomas was awarded a Congressional Gold Medal for her service in the WASPs on July 1, 2009. She was invested with the Medal on March 10, 2010 by then House Speaker Nancy Pelosi and the House Minority Leader John Boehner also spoke at the Emancipation Hall of US Congress in Washington D.C.
