= Hamilton Corbett =

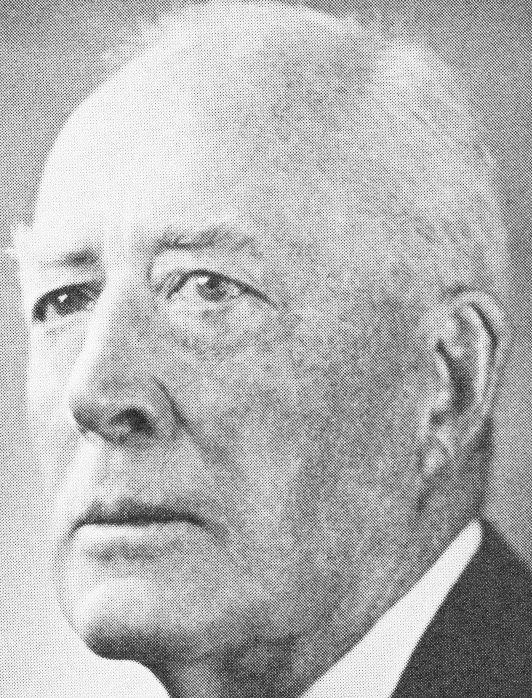

Harvard Crimson
- Positions: Fullback, Halfback

Personal information
- Born: December 13, 1888; Portland, Oregon, U.S.
- Died: May 7, 1966 (aged 77); Portland, Oregon, U.S.

Career information
- College: Harvard (1908–1910)

Awards and highlights
- National champion (1910); Consensus All-American (1908); 2× Third-team All-American (1909, 1910)

Hamilton Forbush "Ham" Corbett (December 13, 1888 – May 7, 1966) was a prominent Portland, Oregon businessman and in his younger years was a leading amateur American football player. He played college football for Harvard University and was a consensus first-team selection to the 1908 College Football All-America Team.

== Early life ==
Corbett was born in Portland, Oregon, in 1888, the son of Henry Jagger Corbett and Helen Ladd Corbett. The Corbett family was one of the influential families in Oregon at that time. Corbett's paternal grandfather was Henry W. Corbett, a leading businessman and banker and a United States senator from Oregon. His maternal grandfather, William S. Ladd, had been an early mayor of Portland (the fifth and again as the eighth). Ladd was also a major business figure and founder the Ladd and Tilton Bank, the first bank established in the state of Oregon.

Corbett grew up in Portland, where he attended the Portland Academy. His father died in 1895, when he was 7 years old. Since his father and his brother had predeceased his grandfather, Henry W. Corbett, who died in 1903, Corbett and his two older brothers Henry L. Corbett and Elliott R. Corbett inherited the responsibility for the H. W. Corbett estate.

== Sports career ==
Corbett attended Harvard College from 1907 to 1911 and played on the freshman football team in 1907. He was five feet, eleven inches tall and weighed 167 pounds while at Harvard. From 1908 to 1910, he played on the Harvard Crimson football team. He was selected as a consensus first-team fullback on the 1908 College Football All-America Team. In 1909, Walter Camp selected him as a third-team All-American at the halfback position. In 1910, he was selected as a first-team All-American halfback by sports writer, W.S. Farnsworth, of the New York Evening Journal, and a second-team All-American by The New York Times.

In the fall of 1913, he served as an assistant coach under Percy Haughton for the 1913 Harvard Crimson football team.

== World War I service ==
In May 1917, with the United States entry into World War I, Corbett entered the Officer's Training Camp at the Presidio of San Francisco. He was commissioned as a first lieutenant and sailed to France in September 1917, serving there with the 151st Field Artillery, 42nd Division. He was wounded in July 1918 and was promoted to captain. When the war ended, he remained with the occupation forces in Germany, serving as aide-de-camp to Major General James Harbord. He received his discharge from the military in May 1919.

== Family ==
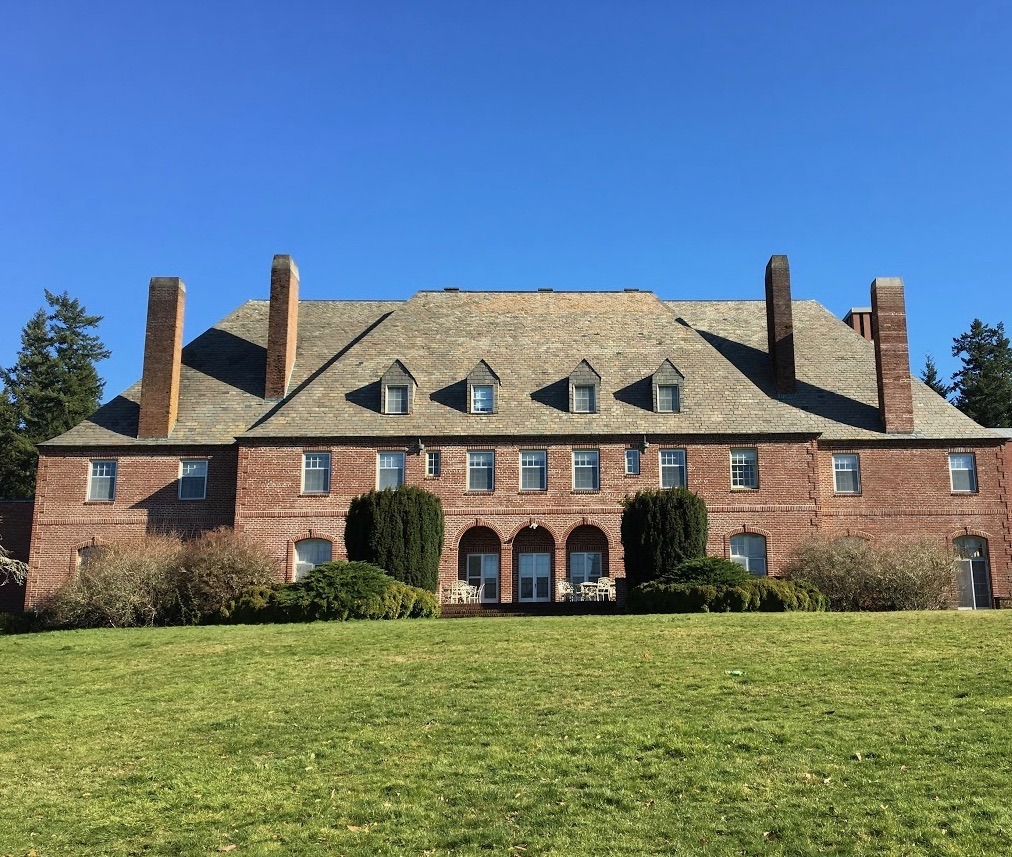
Hamilton Corbett house S. (Gretchen Forster, 2018)

Corbett was married to Harriet Cumming at Portland in 1920. They built their home on Palatine Hill in Dunthorpe in 1928, designed by Pietro Belluschi. He had one daughter by his first marriage: Harriet Corbett, born in 1922. The first marriage was later dissolved.

Corbett married for a second time, to Charlotte Breyman Thomson, in 1944, at Lakewood, Washington.

== Business career ==
Hamilton Corbett was the youngest of three brothers but was an equal partner with his two elder brothers Henry L. Corbett and Elliott R. Corbett in the Corbett Investment Company, with offices on the tenth floor of the Corbett Building, which the Corbett brothers had built in 1907.

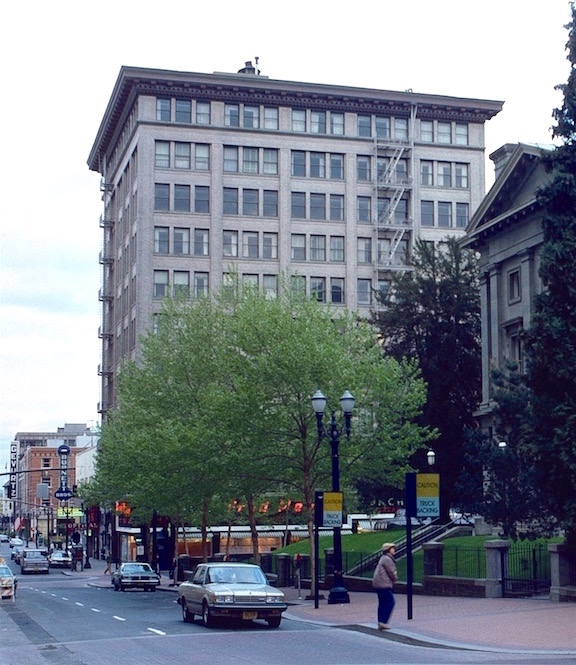
The Corbett Building in 1984

With the death of their grandfather Henry W. Corbett in 1903, the three brothers inherited his businesses, including 27 downtown Portland properties. The three Corbett brothers also then controlled the First National Bank of Portland.

Hamilton Corbett was President of the Security and Saving Trust Company, a saving and trust company the brothers controlled through the bank.

They were also involved in a number of large real estate ventures in Portland. As well as building the Corbett Building in 1907, Corbett and his brothers built the ten-story Pacific Building in 1926 on property they owned across the street from the Pioneer Courthouse in Portland. The building site was on the Yamhill frontage of the landscaped "cow pasture" in the grounds of the house and gardens of their grandfather, Henry W. Corbett, which occupied the block bounded by Taylor, 5th Avenue, Yamhill and Sixth Avenues. His widow remained living in the house fronting on Taylor on the other part of the block until her death in 1936.

Today, the Pacific Building, built by Corbett and his brothers, is a historic landmark in downtown Portland. The classic ten-story office building is listed on the National Register of Historic Places.

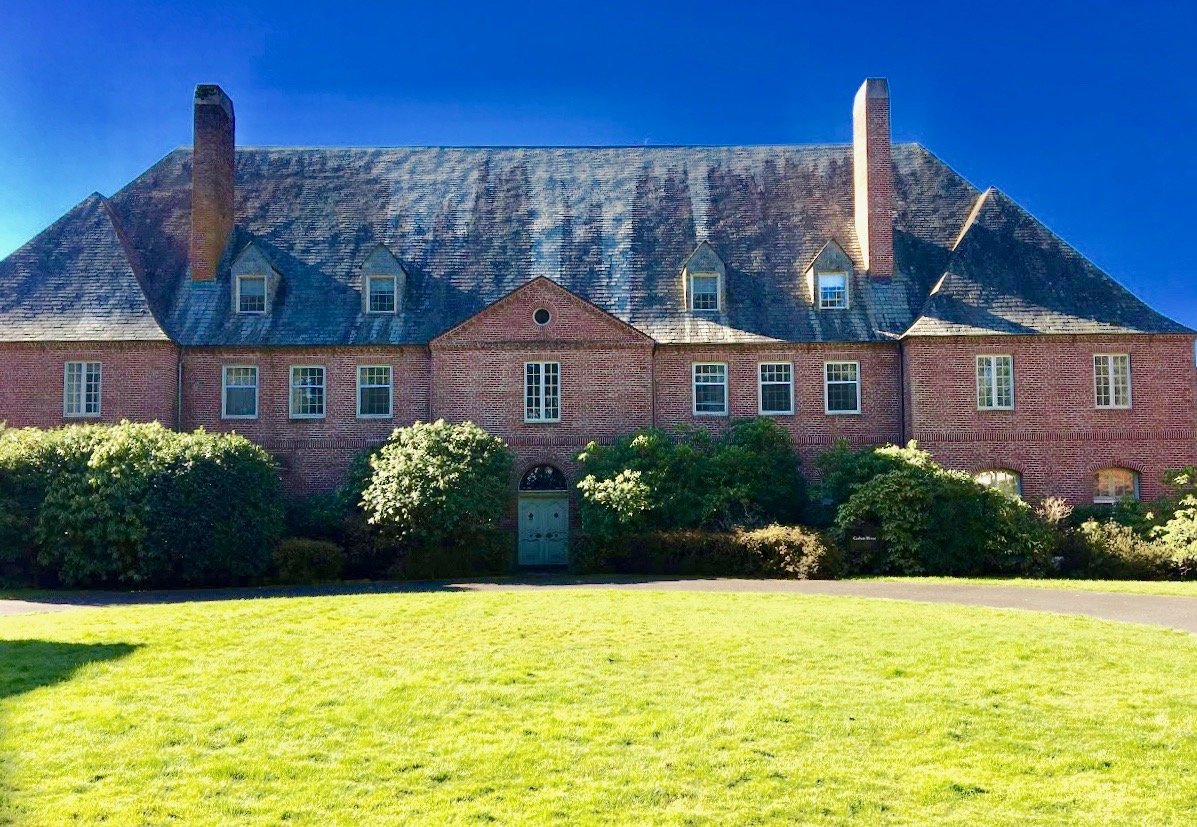
Hamilton Corbett house N. (Gretchen Forster, 2018)

The real estate holding company owned by the Corbett brothers, sold several of its downtown buildings in 1956. The properties included the Pacific Building, the ten-story Corbett Building, and the Corbett Brothers Auto Storage Garage plus two quarter-block lots in downtown Portland.

Hamilton Corbett served as President of the Portland Chamber of Commerce and aided many volunteer organisations.

== Death ==
Hamilton Forbush Corbett died in Portland in 1966 at age 77 and is buried in the Corbett plot on the crest of River View Cemetery, in Portland.
