= Riverdale School District (Oregon) =

School district in Oregon, United States

Address
- 11733 S Breyman Ave. Portland, Oregon, 97219; United States

District information
- Type: Public
- Grades: PK–12
- Superintendent: Chris Russo
- NCES District ID: 4110560

Students and staff
- Students: 564
- Teachers: 39.99 (FTE)
- Student–teacher ratio: 14.10

Other information
- Website: https://www.riverdaleschool.com/

The Riverdale School District (51J) is a public school district in Portland, Oregon. It serves students in the Dunthorpe neighborhood of Portland, seven miles south of downtown adjacent to Lake Oswego. It has two schools: Riverdale Grade School for students in K–8, and Riverdale High School for grades 9–12.

== History ==
The school district was created in 1888 when residents of the area petitioned to be split off from a larger neighboring district due to the distance children had to travel to school. Initially the district was only for students in kindergarten through eighth grade; the district added a high school in 1996 to comply with legislation that required all school districts in the state offer K–12 education.

== List of schools ==
Name	Grades	Mascot	Enrollment
Riverdale Grade School	K–8	Falcon	464
Riverdale High School	9–12	Maverick	164

== School Board ==
The board of directors consists of five members.

Zone	Name	Term ends
1	Shaina Weinstein	2029
2	Mina Stricklin	2027
3	Michele Rosenbaum	2029
4	Ali Lanenga	2027
5	Milessa Lowrie	2029
