= Riverdale High School (Oregon) =

Location
- 9727 SW Terwilliger Blvd. Portland, Multnomah County, Oregon 97219; United States; 45.45451°N 122.684535°W

Information
- Type: Public
- Opened: 1996
- School district: Riverdale School District
- Principal: Tyler Shelden
- Grades: 9-12
- Enrollment: 240 (2015-16)
- Campus: Suburban
- Colors: Navy blue and silver
- Athletics conference: 3A-2 Coastal Range League
- Mascot: Max the Maverick
- Newspaper: The Maverick
- Website: www.riverdalehs.com

Riverdale High School is a public high school in the Dunthorpe neighborhood of Portland, Oregon, United States. The high school is a public school, but students from outside the district must go through an admissions process and pay tuition to attend, unless they get a district transfer from their original district. According to 24/7 Wall St.'s analysis of U.S. Census data from 2006 through 2010, the Riverdale School District is the third richest school district in the United States.

== Academics ==
Riverdale High School is among the best academically performing high schools in Oregon by various measures, including academic proficiency, graduation rate, college enrollment, and standardized test scores, which are frequently the best in the state. The school is part of the Coalition of Essential Schools and takes pride in its college preparatory education.

In 2008, all 38 of the school's seniors received their high school diploma.

The Thomas B. Fordham Institute describes Riverdale as a "public private school", meaning it is a public school that serves "virtually no poor students", with 2.46% of students low income, and 96% of students being white.

=== Athletics ===
Riverdale is classified as a 3A school by the Oregon School Activities Association, but many of the school's sports teams compete in other divisions. During the fall term, students participate in Boys and Girls Soccer, Cross-Country and Girls Volleyball, And has a partnership with Gladstone High School (Oregon) for football where they compete in a 4A league. In winter, Boys and Girls Basketball and Swimming are offered. Snowboard and Ski clubs also exist during winter term. In spring term, students compete in Golf and Track & Field, as well as Boys and Girls Tennis and Lacrosse.

=== Clubs and activities ===
Riverdale's varsity mock trial team in 2005 beat the private school Catlin Gabel for the state championship and went on to nationals in Charlotte, North Carolina where they placed in the top half of the country’s teams. In 2013 the team placed second in state to St. Mary's Academy.

Riverdale Robotics Pandamonium, Riverdale's FIRST Robotics Competition Team, was selected for the Rookie All Star award in March 2009. This award is the most prestigious award that a rookie team can get and entitled them to go to the 2009 FIRST Championship in Atlanta, Georgia, on April 17, 2009.
