= Corbett Brothers Auto Storage Garage =

Historic building in Portland, Oregon, U.S.

- U.S. National Register of Historic Places
- Portland Historic Landmark
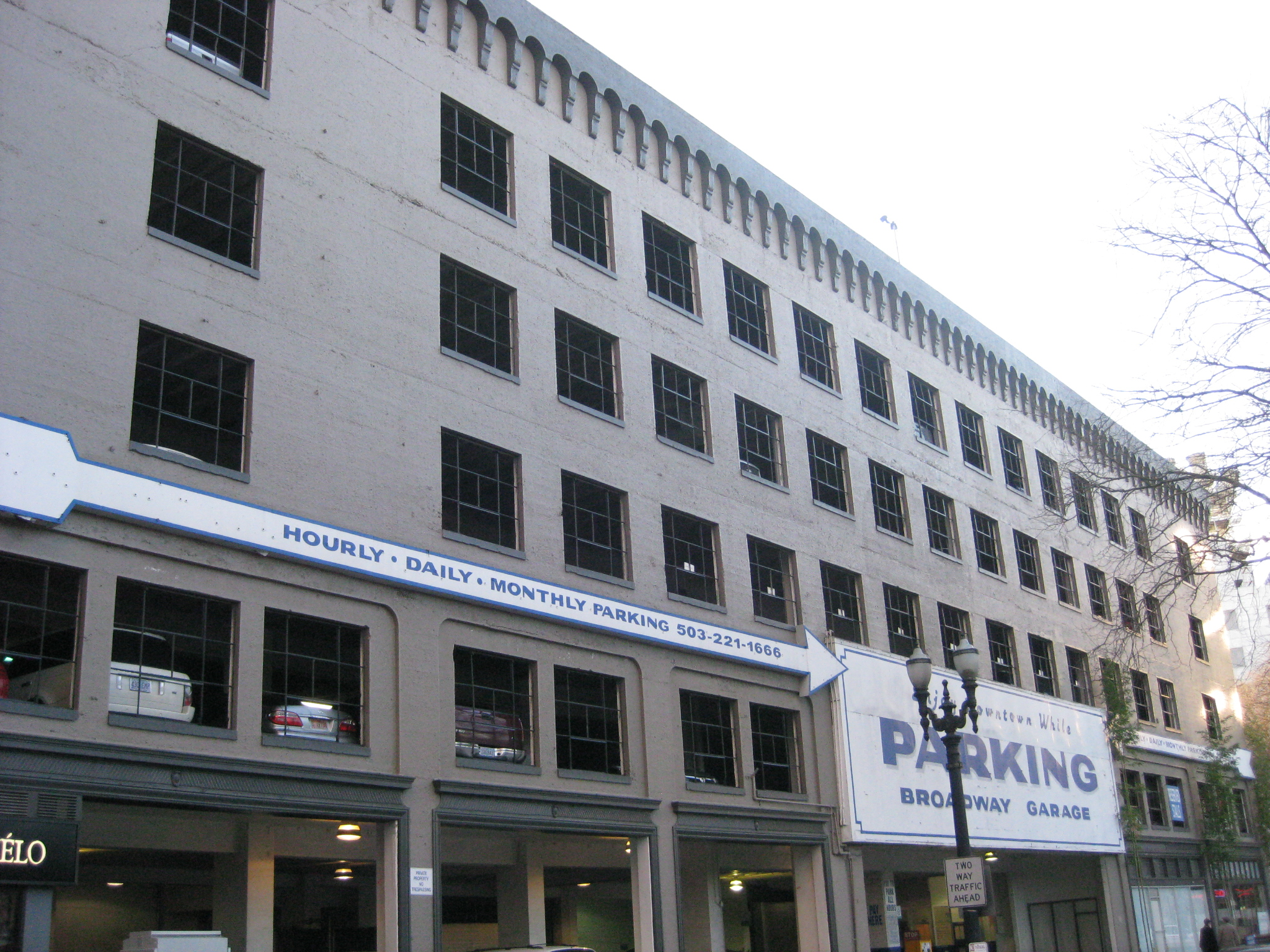

- Location within Portland, Oregon Location within Oregon Location within the United States
- Location: 630 SW Pine Street; Portland, Oregon
- Coordinates: 45°31′20″N 122°40′39″W
- Area: less than one acre
- Built: 1926
- Architect: A. E. Doyle
- Architectural style: Late 19th and 20th Century Revivals, Mediterranean
- NRHP reference No.: 96000999
- Added to NRHP: September 12, 1996

The Corbett Brothers Auto Storage Garage is a building located in downtown Portland, Oregon, listed on the National Register of Historic Places.

== See also ==
- National Register of Historic Places listings in Southwest Portland, Oregon
