= J. André Fouilhoux =

American architect (1879–1945)

- Born: Jacques André Fouilhoux; September 27, 1879; Paris, France
- Died: June 20, 1945 (aged 65); New York City, US
- Education: Ecole Centrale des Arts et Manufactures, University of Paris (Sorbonne)
- Occupation: Architect
- Spouse: Jean Butler Clark
- Awards: American Institute of Architects New York Chapter
- Buildings: Tribune Tower, Rockefeller Center, Daily News Building

Jacques André Fouilhoux (September 27, 1879 – June 20, 1945) was a French-born architect active in the United States from 1904 to 1945. He is most well known for his work on Tribune Tower in Chicago; Rockefeller Center; early skyscrapers such as the Daily News Building and 30 Rockefeller Plaza; and the 1939 New York World's Fair, for which he designed the central Trylon and Perisphere. Many of his early works are also listed in the National Historic Register, including 705 Davis Street Apartments and Wickersham Apartments in Portland, Oregon. According to the New York City Landmarks Preservation Commission, Fouilhoux has received less attention than partners such as John Mead Howells and Raymond Hood, but was "known as an astute engineer and a painstaking supervisor and his work gained the respect of his collaborators."

== Early life and education ==
Jacques André Fouilhoux, better known as J.A. Fouilhoux throughout his career in the United States, was born to a Catholic family in Paris, France, on September 27, 1879. He attended the Lycée Janson-de-Sailly in Paris, and went on to earn B.A., B.S. and B.Ph. degrees from the University of Paris (Sorbonne). He was then accepted into the Ecole Centrale des Arts et Manufactures, where he studied architecture as well as civil and mechanical engineering. Following his graduation, he moved to the United States in 1904 and began his architectural career as a draftsman for Albert Kahn in Detroit. In 1908, he and Jean Butler Clark of Baltimore married in New York.

== Career ==
=== Early works ===
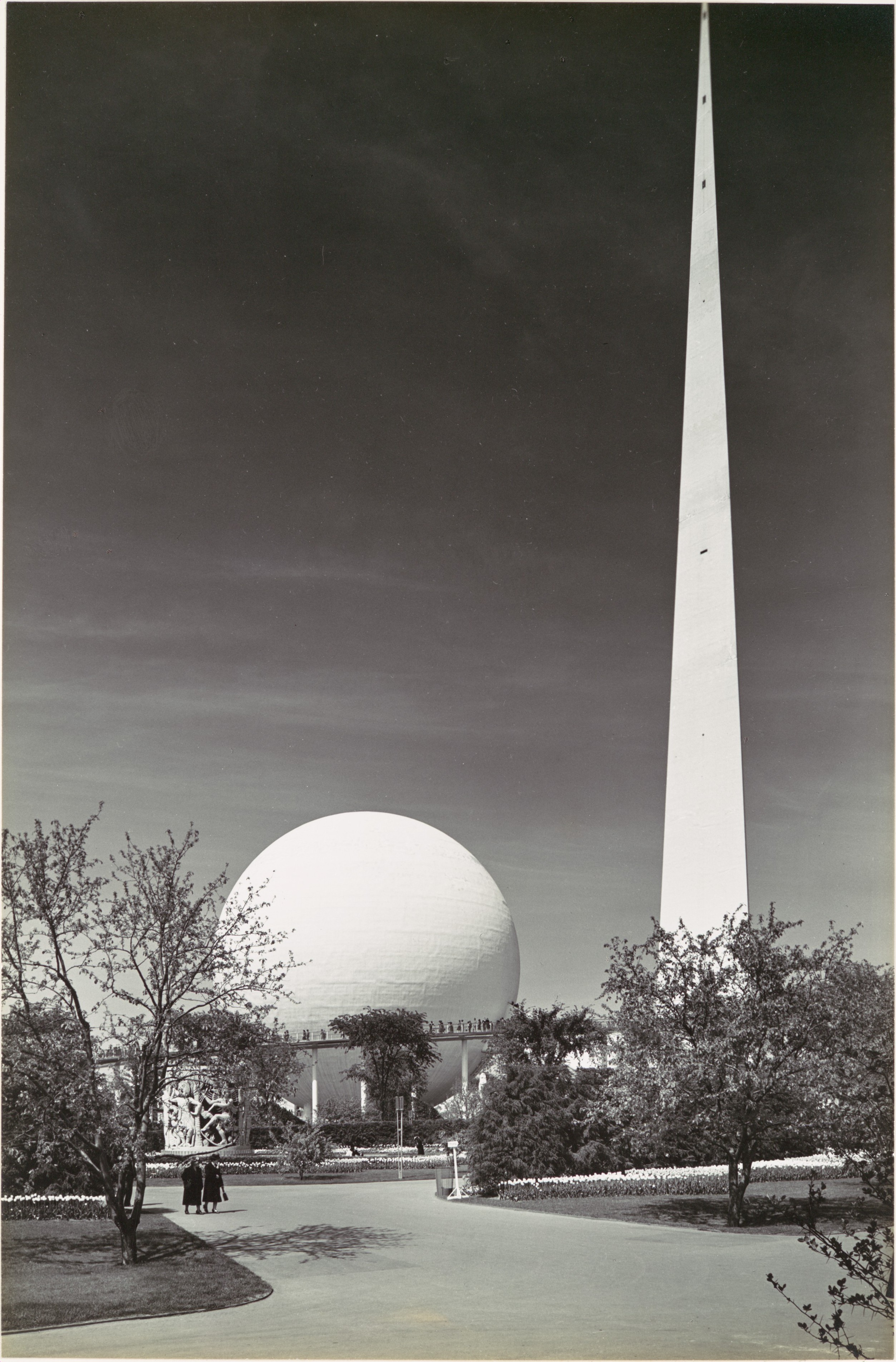
Trylon and Perisphere at the 1939 New York World's Fair

In 1909, Fouilhoux relocated to Portland, and began a partnership with Morris H. Whitehouse that would last until World War I. Fouilhoux was prolific during the eight years he worked in Portland, and constructed a dozen notable buildings, including educational institutions (e.g., Jefferson High School, the University Club) and residential buildings. His earliest works were constructed in late-19th and early-20th century revival styles—French Renaissance, Collegiate Gothic, Tudor, Jacobethan, Colonial, and English Arts and Crafts. While this design approach befit the zeitgeist, critics and historic preservationists describe a unique perspective in his architectural style. This is especially evident in Jefferson High School (1909), which subtly revealed and navigated tensions between the Classical Revival movement and more modern Arts and Crafts style.

Fouilhoux's architecture, particularly the balance between referential embellishment and modern sensibility, had an enduring effect on Oregon. Many of his buildings there are still standing and listed on the National Register of Historic Places. Several continue to be highly sought-after residences that have defined luxurious neighborhoods, such as Wickersham Apartments (1910) and 705 Davis Street Apartments (1913).

With the outbreak of World War I, Fouilhoux put his burgeoning career on pause and enlisted in the U.S. Army. He served as an officer in France in the 129th Field Artillery Regiment with future president Harry S. Truman and was discharged with the rank of major.

=== Tribune Tower and Daily News Building ===
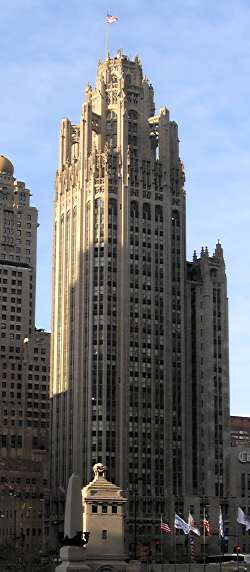
Tribune Tower, Chicago (1925)

In 1920, Fouilhoux returned to the U.S. and for the rest of his life would be based in New York He began making substantial contributions to modernist design approaches that would create a new architectural specter: the skyscraper. In the post-war architectural boom, Fouilhoux's work espoused and memorialized American democratic values, particularly freedom of the press.

In 1922, Fouilhoux, Raymond Hood and John Mead Howells devised a design submission to the international competition for the Tribune Tower in Chicago along with over 260 other entries. With Fouilhoux working as an associate to partners Hood and Howells, their submission won the competition. The building melded medieval gothic architectural design elements with the Art Deco sensibility of a modern office building. A lightness in the building's gothic details enables the vibrancy of the design to not be beholden to its silhouette, as with other skyscrapers. Hood and Howell's design and the praise from the competition jurors encapsulated the architectural moment of the time—nostalgic, but on the brink of modern. Old elements were used in new ways, including at least 150 artifacts from historic sites that decorated the walls alongside quotes from historical figures. These inscriptions and sculptural details span decades and continents, memorializing the past in order to imagine the future that the Tribune Company aimed for.

Upon opening in 1925, the building was described by critics as idiosyncratic but designed for practical use, with historical perspective, humor, and a vision of the future. Fouilhoux and other contributors were immortalized as fable characters in Aesop's screen in a large carved stone display above the main entrance. In a nod to the nickname assigned to Frenchmen during World War I, Fouilhoux is represented by a frog.

In 1930, Howells, Hood and Fouilhoux designed another journalism building—the Daily News Building in New York. Though the owners of the News Building and Tribune Tower had family ties, the buildings did not share the neo-gothic design influence that distinguishes the latter; with the towering skyscraper design of the News Building, Fouilhoux entered into the "modernist vanguard." The News Building does, however, share Tribune Tower's use of art deco elements and quotes and symbols of democratic values and the American Protestant work ethic. The building was well received by critics, architects and New Yorkers, with a 1932 exhibition at MoMA describing it as the "most effective skyscraper in New York."

=== Rockefeller Center ===
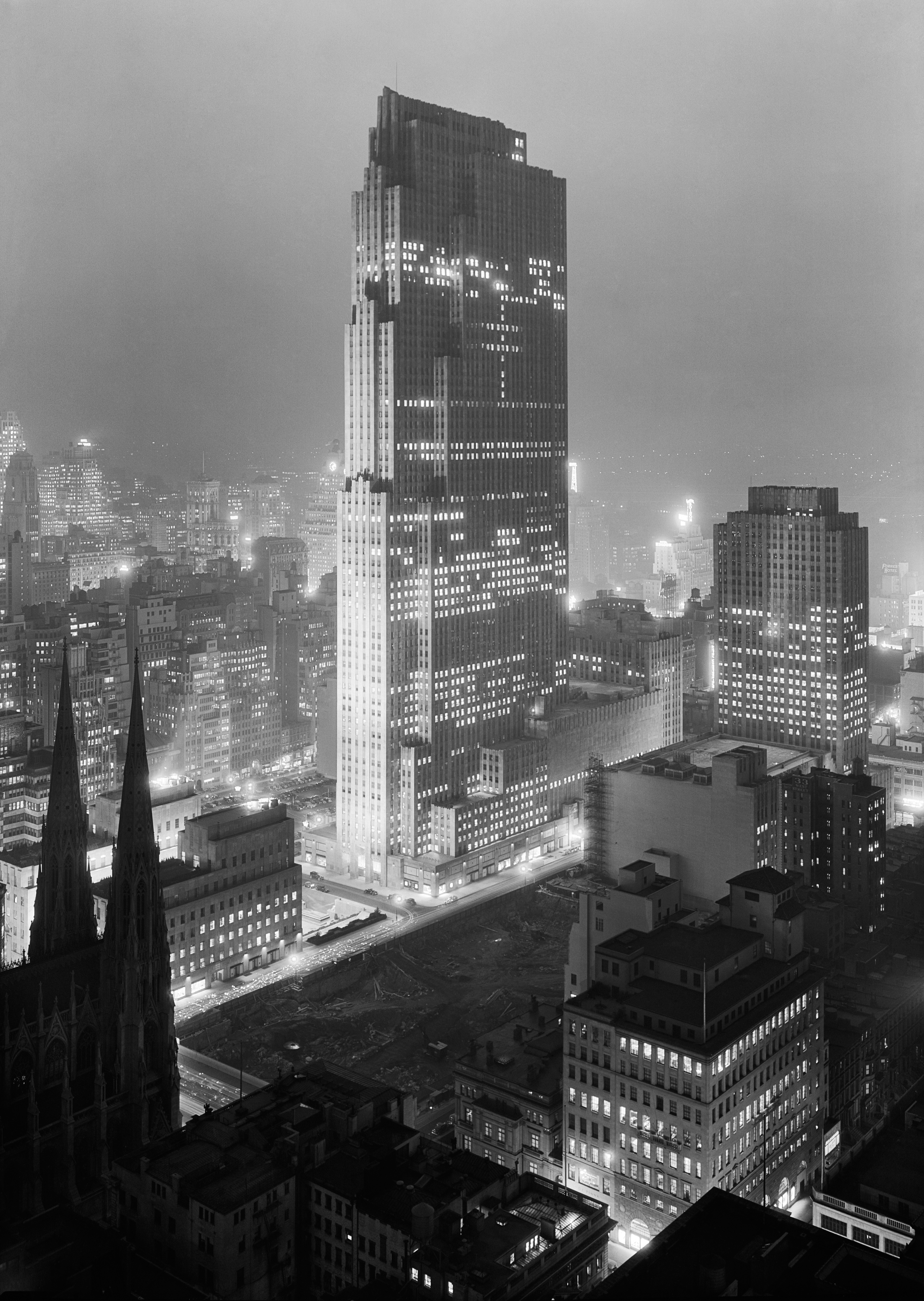
Construction of Rockefeller Center in New York

In 1931, Fouilhoux joined a consortium of preeminent architectural firms coordinated by Raymond Hood that would be involved in the construction of Rockefeller Center. Todd, Robertson and Todd Engineering Corp., as advisers to John D. Rockefeller and his family, "selected architects who would be primarily interested in good planning, utility, cost, income, low operating expenses and progress ... men who were not committed to the architectural past nor too much interested in wild modernism." Three different firms—listed as Corbett, Harrison & MacMurray; Hood, Godley & Fouilhoux; and Reinhard & Hofmeister—formed the collective Associated Architects for Rockefeller Center. Fouilhoux had the greatest influence on the central fixture of the complex, 30 Rockefeller Plaza, known colloquially as "30 Rock". The RCA combined Art Deco design elements with Beaux-Arts inspiration and the increasingly widespread International Style. From its inception, Rockefeller Center has captured the urban imagination of commercial media. In the 1980s, Paul Goldberger of The New York Times reflected on its status: "It was always respected. Now, however, it seems more to be idolized, copied by young architects as they sketch new towers and chosen by urban planners as the model that large-scale urban complexes should strive to follow."

After Hood's death in 1934, and following his work on Rockefeller Center, Fouilhoux partnered with Wallace Harrison on a commission from John D. and Nelson Rockefeller to design the Rockefeller Apartments just to the north. Though there was not a strong demand for housing in Manhattan at the time, the Rockefeller Apartments accumulated a long wait-list before completion because they were an ideal size for young professionals working at Rockefeller Center or Midtown Manhattan. Built in an international style with rounded and south-facing bay windows, it was praised by critics for its strong, progressive design aesthetics and practicalities. Noted urbanist Lewis Mumford compared the apartment build with a romantic row of buildings in an old neighborhood in Germany: "When the windows are open up and down the façade, the effect is like a sudden whirring of birds' wings out of a tree. And if anyone wants to know what is modern ornament, that's what it is—something built for use, which suddenly, when it hits you at the right angle, begins to sing like the four-and-twenty blackbirds."

=== World of Tomorrow ===
The 1939 New York World's Fair was Fouilhoux and Harrison's most audacious architectural and engineering work. The New York Building Commission wrote that Fouilhoux's design contributions "created the distinctive tone of the exhibition." The 1939 World's Fair would be the second most expensive American World's Fair—an ambitious endeavor during the uncertain time following the Great Depression and leading up to World War II. In 1934, the fair's intended theme was to honor the 150th anniversary of the inauguration of George Washington, however the more abstract, forward-thinking theme "Building the World of Tomorrow" won out by 1936.

The theme and, in turn, design concept therefore prioritized a "utopian aura" that would employ "a structure of ephemeral lines" according to The New York Times. Built in Flushing Meadows–Corona Park, a former dump site in Queens, the Fair used over 1,200 acres to imagine the future through a lens of innovation, consumerism, and commercialization. The exhibitions and recreational space were made possible through relationships with 60 countries and 121 New York organizations. According to the book Trylon and Perisphere, "Its goal was to display to the world its organizers' boundless belief in American business and industry, in peace and freedom, and in the potential of average Americans to rise above their difficulties."

Fouilhoux's greatest influence was on the central figures of the Fair—the Trylon and Perisphere, respectively a large triangular pyramid and the largest sphere ever constructed. Imposing white masses of the "finite and infinite"—sometimes called the "spike and sphere" or "ball and bat"—they aptly represented futurism based on modernist principles that envisioned extreme abstractions achievable through new technologies. The Trylon and Perisphere represented impressive feats of engineering, requiring 2,000 cubic yards of concrete, over 7,000 individual pieces, and adding up to a combined weight of approximately 10,000 tons. The Trylon was 610 feet high and the perisphere was 180 feet in diameter and 18 stories high. Inside the Perisphere, accessible via what were the largest escalators in the world, was "Democracity"—the central exhibit of the fair and vision of America's future in 2039. Technological achievements were central to the Fair theme and to Harrison and Fouilhoux's designs, evidenced in the engineering of the Trylon and Perisphere as well as the emphasis on electrification seen in the Consolidated Edison and Electric Utility building exhibitions. The Fair embodied an imposing physicality and ambitious futuristic vision and welcomed almost 50 million visitors during the two seasons it was open. Despite these achievements, it did not live up to attendance or financial revenue goals. Still, it was "by no means a flop… it literally and figuratively replaced ashes with promise... On a practical level, it offered a preview of the tools needed to rebuild the world after the war."

With the advent of World War II, architectural opportunities and priorities moved away from imposing skyline-defining monuments. In 1941, Fouilhoux joined the firm Harrison, Fouilhoux & Abramovitz and completed the Crotona Toll House for the Bronx Zoo and worked on military bases at Coco Solo and Balboa, Canal Zone. He then worked on the Clinton Hill Housing Development, also called the Clinton Hill Co-ops—good-quality affordable housing for workers and officers of the nearby Brooklyn Navy Yard. While some community members lamented the demolition of the 19th century mansions that were removed to make way for the development, the Clinton Hill Co-ops played a significant role in stabilizing the neighborhood with middle-class housing during the war. The Clinton Hill Co-ops would be Fouilhoux's final contribution to the architecture of New York City. He fell to his death on June 20, 1945, while conducting an inspection of the Clinton Hill Co-ops roof and upper floors.

=== Legacy ===
Tribune Tower and Rockefeller Center are Fouilhoux's most enduring feats of engineering and architectural design and continue to be tourist destinations, as well as culturally notable in academic circles. Though the Trylon and Perisphere of the 1939 World's Fair were dismantled for the war effort, they "earned an enduring legacy as one of the world's greatest symbols of hope for the future." Books, postage stamps, figurines, postcards, and many more paraphernalia immortalized the imagery of Fouilhoux's spike and sphere. Other significant buildings that Fouilhoux worked on include the American Radiator Building and McGraw-Hill Building in Manhattan, and the Masonic Temple (now the Scranton Cultural Center).

Citations and professional connections

- Fellow of the American Institute of Architects (AIA) awarded May 26, 1943
- Citation from the New York Chapter of AIA on February 14, 1945
- First prize, New York Chapter of AIA competition for the design of small, affordable dwelling for families, 1935
- President of New York Building Congress, elected 1942, 1945
- Member of the American Society of Civil Engineers
- Member of the Architectural League of New York
- Chairman of the French Engineers in the United States, Inc.
- Treasurer and trustee of the Beaux-Arts Institute of Design
- Member of the Advisory Council of the Cooper Union Art School
- Visiting Critic at the Columbia School of Architecture
- Member of visiting committee of the School of Architecture of Massachusetts Institute of Technology
- President of the American Relief for France, Inc.
- Vice President and trustee of the French Hospital and French Benevolent Society
- Board of Trustees of St. Vincent de Paul Institute
- Member of the Commerce and Industry Association of New York
- The University Club
- The Catholic Club
- President of the Liturgical Arts Society

List of works
Building	City, State	Date	Role	Style	Citation
Jefferson High School	Portland, Oregon	1909	Architect	Renaissance Revival	
Lincoln High School (now Lincoln Hall at PSU)	Portland, Oregon	1910	Architect	Classical Revival	
Conro Fiero House	Central Point, Oregon	1910	Architect	Tudor Revival	
Wickersham Apartments	Portland, Oregon	1910	Architect	Tudor Revival	
Anna Lewis Mann Old People's Home	Portland, Oregon	1911	Architect	Tudor Revival, Collegiate Gothic	
Failing Grammar Schoolhouse (now National University of Natural Medicine)	Portland, Oregon	1912	Architect	Renaissance Revival	
University Club	Portland, Oregon	1913	Architect	Jacobethan	
705 Davis Street Apartments	Portland, Oregon	1913	Architect	Renaissance Revival	
Waverley Country Club Clubhouse	Portland, Oregon	1913	Architect	Colonial Revival	
Elliott R. Corbett House	Portland, Oregon	1915	Architect	Colonial Revival	
H. L. and Gretchen Hoyt Corbett House	Portland, Oregon	1916	Architect	Colonial Revival	
Astoria Methodist Church	Astoria, Oregon	1916	Architect	Colonial Revival	
St. Vincent de Paul Asylum	Tarrytown, New York	1924	Architect		
Tribune Tower	Chicago, Illinois	1924	Architect	Gothic Revival	
American Radiator Building (American Standard Building)	Manhattan, New York	1924	Architect	Gothic Art Deco	
Ocean Forest Country Club	Myrtle Beach, South Carolina	1929	Architect	Neoclassical	
Daily News Building	Manhattan, New York	1930	Architect	Art Deco	
Masonic Temple (Scranton Cultural Center)	Scranton, Pennsylvania	1930	Architect	Art Deco	
Rockefeller Center	Manhattan, New York	1931	Architect	Art Deco, International Style	
McGraw-Hill Building	Manhattan, New York	1931	Architect	International Style	
Rockefeller Apartments	Manhattan, New York	1937	Architect	International Style	
Trylon and Perisphere, 1939 World's Fair	Manhattan, New York	1939	Architect	Modernist	
Crotona Toll House	Bronx, New York	1941	Architect		
Clinton Hill Cooperative Development	Brooklyn, New York	1943	Architect	Modernist	
Facilities at Submarine and Air Base Coco Solo	Cativá, Panama	1944	Architect	Modernist	

== See also ==
- Whitehouse & Fouilhoux
- Howells and Hood
