= Corbett House =

Corbett House may refer to:

- Beatty-Corbett House, Ivanhoe, North Carolina, listed on the National Register of Historic Places (NRHP)
- Elliott R. Corbett House, near Portland, Oregon, NRHP-listed
- H. L. and Gretchen Hoyt Corbett House, near Portland, Oregon, listed on the NRHP in Multnomah County, Oregon
- Jovita Land Company Model Home-Corbett House, Federal Way, Washington, listed on the NRHP in King County, Washington
- J. Ralph & Patricia B. Corbett House, Cincinnati, Ohio
