= National University of Natural Medicine =

Private school in Portland, Oregon, U.S.

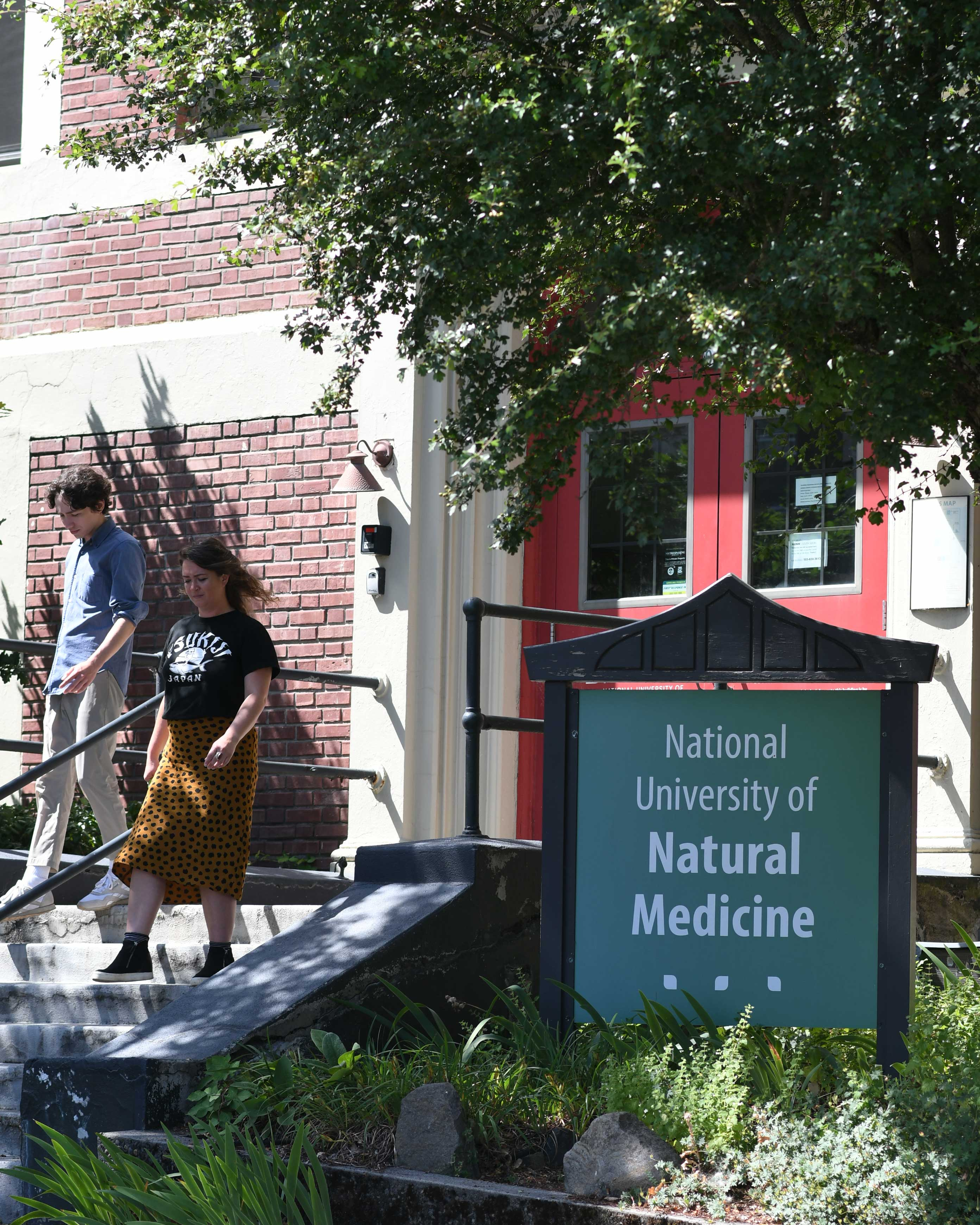
- Former name: National College of Naturopathic Medicine
- Motto: The profession's college since 1956
- Established: 1956
- Affiliations: American Association of Naturopathic Physicians; Association of Accredited Naturopathic Medical Colleges
- President: Melanie Henriksen
- Students: 575
- Location: Portland, Oregon, United States; 45.5016°N 122.6767°W
- Nicknames: National, NUNM
- Mascot: Phoenix
- Website: www.nunm.edu

The National University of Natural Medicine (NUNM) is a private university of naturopathic medicine, Classical Chinese medicine, and nutrition located in Portland, Oregon. The school has approximately 553 students.

NUNM and similar naturopathic programs are not accredited as medical schools but as special programs that are overseen by a naturopathic council which is not required to be scientific. Naturopathic programs have been accused by critics of misrepresenting their medical rigor and their ability to train primary care clinicians.

A 2024 report found that students in NUNM's medical doctorate program had the highest debt-to-income ratio among graduate programs in the US, at 766%.

== History ==
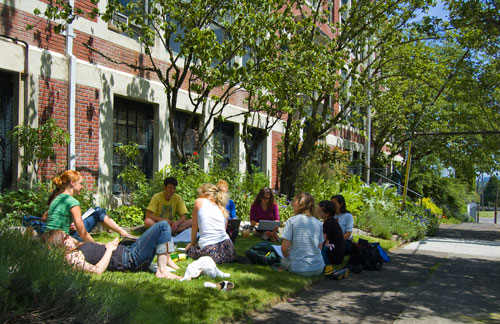
Students on campus

NUNM began in the early 1950s, in response to the termination of the naturopathic program at Western States Chiropractic College. Members of the profession from Oregon, Washington and British Columbia planned the founding of the school and in May 1956, Charles Stone, W. Martin Bleything and Frank Spaulding executed the Articles of Incorporation of the National College of Naturopathic Medicine in Portland, Oregon.

NCNM opened other satellite campus locations in Seattle and Kansas. The first physical location owned by the college was the Market Street campus in southeast Portland.

In July 2006, NCNM changed its name to the National College of Natural Medicine. In June 2016, the school changed its name to the National University of Natural Medicine.

In 2024, Oregon Public Broadcasting reported that students who pursued doctorates of naturopathic medicine typically took on high levels of debt. For NUNM, the median loan was $263,594 and the median earnings were $34,431, resulting in a debt to earnings ratio of 766%. This was the highest ratio among graduate programs in the US.

== Academics ==
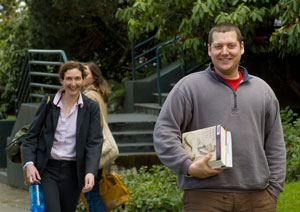
Students on campus

NUNM has four colleges/schools: College of Naturopathic Medicine, College of Classical Chinese Medicine, and School of Undergraduate and Graduate Studies. It offers seven graduate degree programs: Doctor of Naturopathic Medicine (ND), Doctor of Acupuncture with a Chinese Herbal Medicine Specialization (DAcCHM), Master of Acupuncture with a Chinese Herbal Medicine Specialization (MAcCHM), Master of Acupuncture (MAc), Master of Science in Nutrition, and Master of Science in Global Health. Undergraduate programs include nutrition and integrative health sciences. These programs include preparation and clinical practice in holism.

NUNM is a member of the American Association of Naturopathic Medical Colleges and is accredited by the Council on Naturopathic Medical Education and the Accreditation Commission for Acupuncture and Herbal Medicine.

The Princeton Review reports that naturopathic medicine program had an acceptance rate of 82% with an average undergraduate GPA of 3.38.

=== NUNM Clinic ===
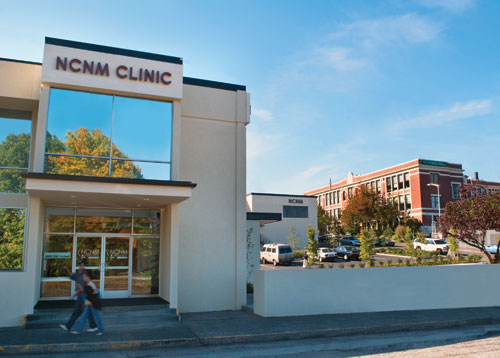
The NUNM Health Center (pictured in 2009) is the primary teaching clinic of National University of Natural Medicine.

The NUNM Health Center is a teaching clinic where naturopaths and acupuncturists work with and train students. It is owned and managed by the university. The health center features a medicinary, private offices, and conference rooms.

The university also has several community clinics, in conjunction with other agencies and as a member of the Coalition of Community Clinics, which offers low-cost naturopathic care and acupuncture in the Portland metropolitan area. In 2013, the NUNM Community Clinics provided services to more than 40,000 patients.

== Campus ==
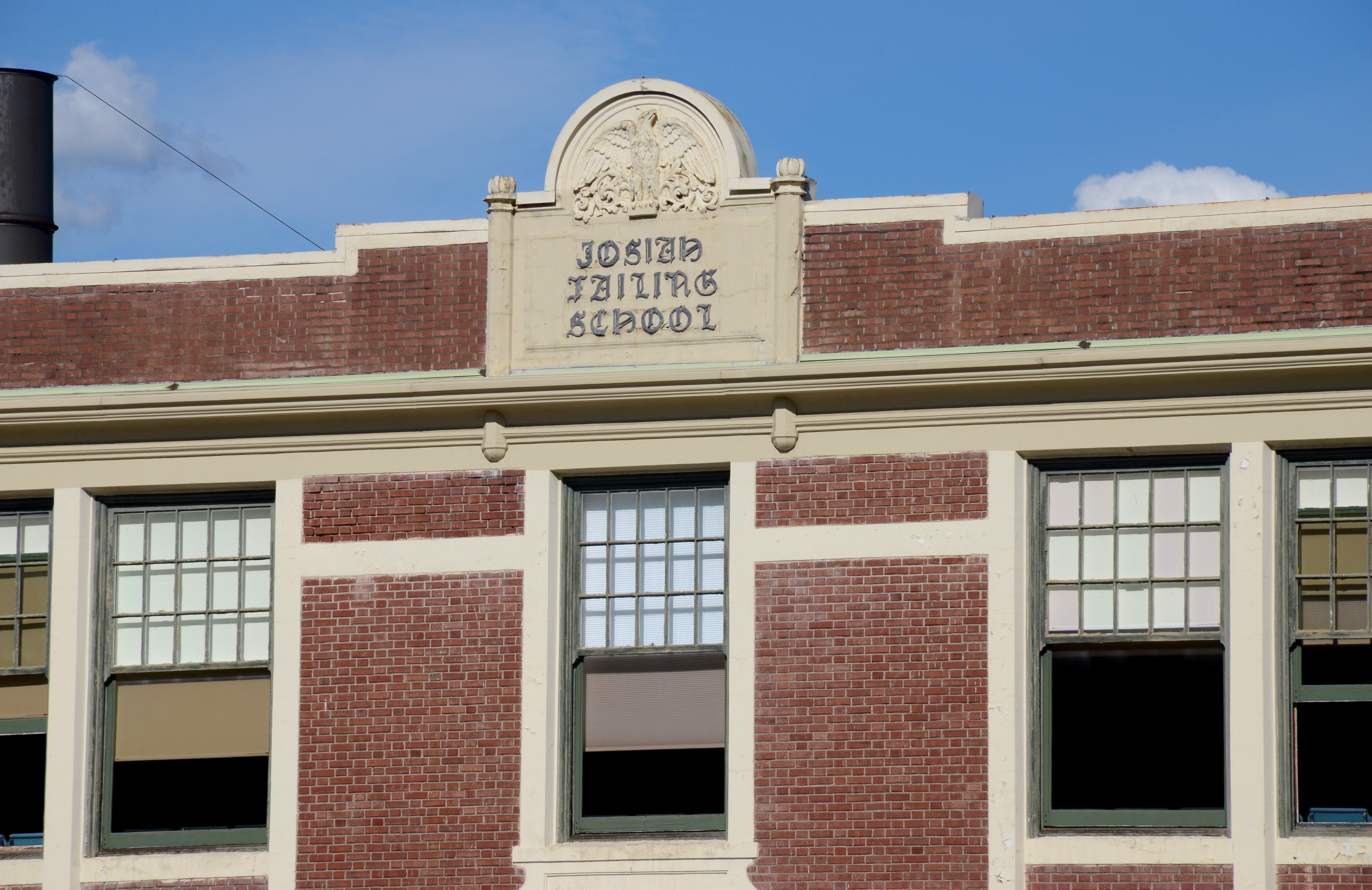
Failing School sign still in place on the roofline of NUNM's main building

NUNM's main building was constructed in 1912 as an elementary school in the Portland Public Schools system, named Failing School, for former mayor Josiah Failing. It was a replacement for an 1883-built wooden school building with that name, located about two blocks away, which was torn down in 1922. The NUNM building was designed by Whitehouse & Fouilhoux, the architectural firm of Morris H. Whitehouse and Jacques Fouilhoux. A distinctive feature is the sundial, instead of a traditional clock, adorning the south façade near the roof.

Failing School closed in spring 1959, and the building was used by Portland public schools for a vocational training program for graduates beginning in fall 1959. In 1961, this program was renamed Portland Community College and the building was renamed the Adult Education Center. The building was extensively renovated in 1964 for expansion of PCC's vocational programs. In 1971, the building was sold to Portland Community College, and it was later renamed the Ross Island Center.

== Criticism ==
Research conducted at NCNM has been called a misuse of research funds, as 2.4 million dollars from 2005 to 2012 were granted by the National Center for Complementary and Integrative Health (NCCIH) and used to support unproven therapies.

The naturopathic curriculum has been criticized for teaching pseudoscience and quackery, as courses in homeopathy, herbalism, acupuncture, and other alternative treatments without a solid evidence basis are taught as "primary care medicine".
