= Columbia Gorge Hotel =

- U.S. National Register of Historic Places
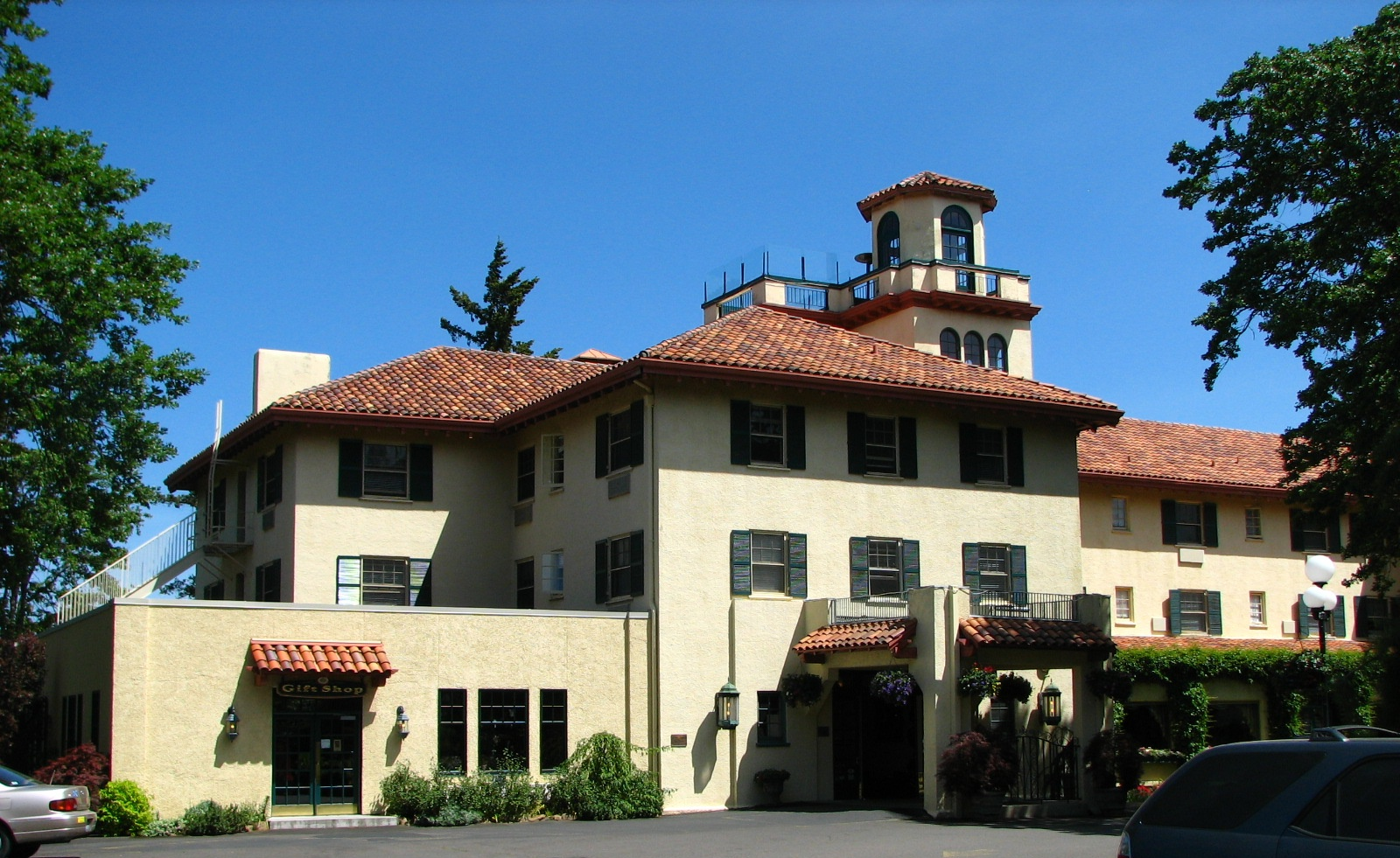

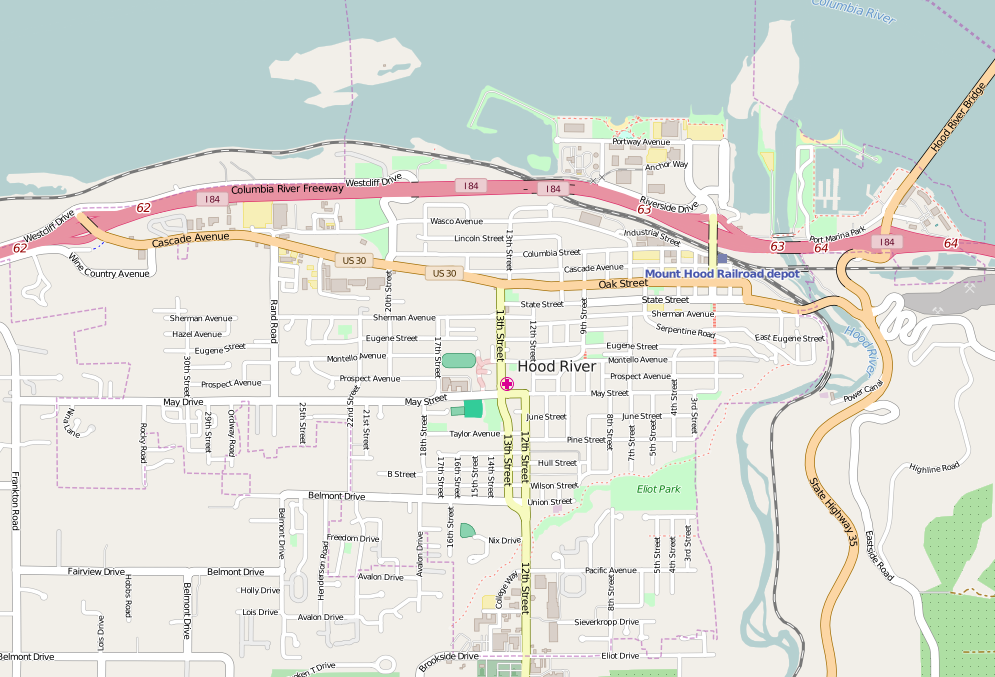
- Location within Hood River OR
- Location: 9000 Westcliffe Dr., Hood River, Oregon
- Coordinates: 45°42′42″N 121°33′11″W
- Built: 1920–21
- Built by: Dinwiddie Construction Co.
- Architect: Morris H. Whitehouse
- Architectural style: Mission/Spanish Revival
- NRHP reference No.: 79003736
- Added to NRHP: September 21, 1979

The Columbia Gorge Hotel is a historic hotel in Hood River, Oregon, United States. It was built by Simon Benson, who was involved with the Columbia Gorge Scenic Highway. Benson envisioned a hotel at the end of the highway, and completed the Mission style hotel in 1921. The new hotel was built on the site of the previous Wah Gwin Gwin Hotel, built in 1904. Between 1925 and 1952, the hotel went through several changes of ownership.

The then-48-room hotel closed in 1952, when it was sold to the Neighbors of Woodcraft, a non-profit fraternal benefit society based in Oregon since 1905, and converted into a retirement home. It was sold again in 1978, with the new owners planning to reopen it as a hotel. After a $1-million renovation, the now-42-room hotel reopened in September 1979.

In January 2009, the hotel closed again, due to foreclosure. The foreclosing bank later re-opened the hotel before selling it to Vijay Patel's A-1 Hospitality Group in October 2009 for around $4 million. Between 2009 and 2012, the hotel underwent a major renovation. The Columbia Gorge Hotel is recognized as one of the Historic Hotels of America by the National Trust for Historic Preservation.

Guests of the hotel have included Burt Reynolds and Shirley Temple, among others.

== See also ==
- National Register of Historic Places listings in Hood River County, Oregon
- Wah Gwin Gwin Falls
