= Black River Presbyterian and Ivanhoe Baptist Churches =

Historic church in North Carolina, United States

- U.S. National Register of Historic Places
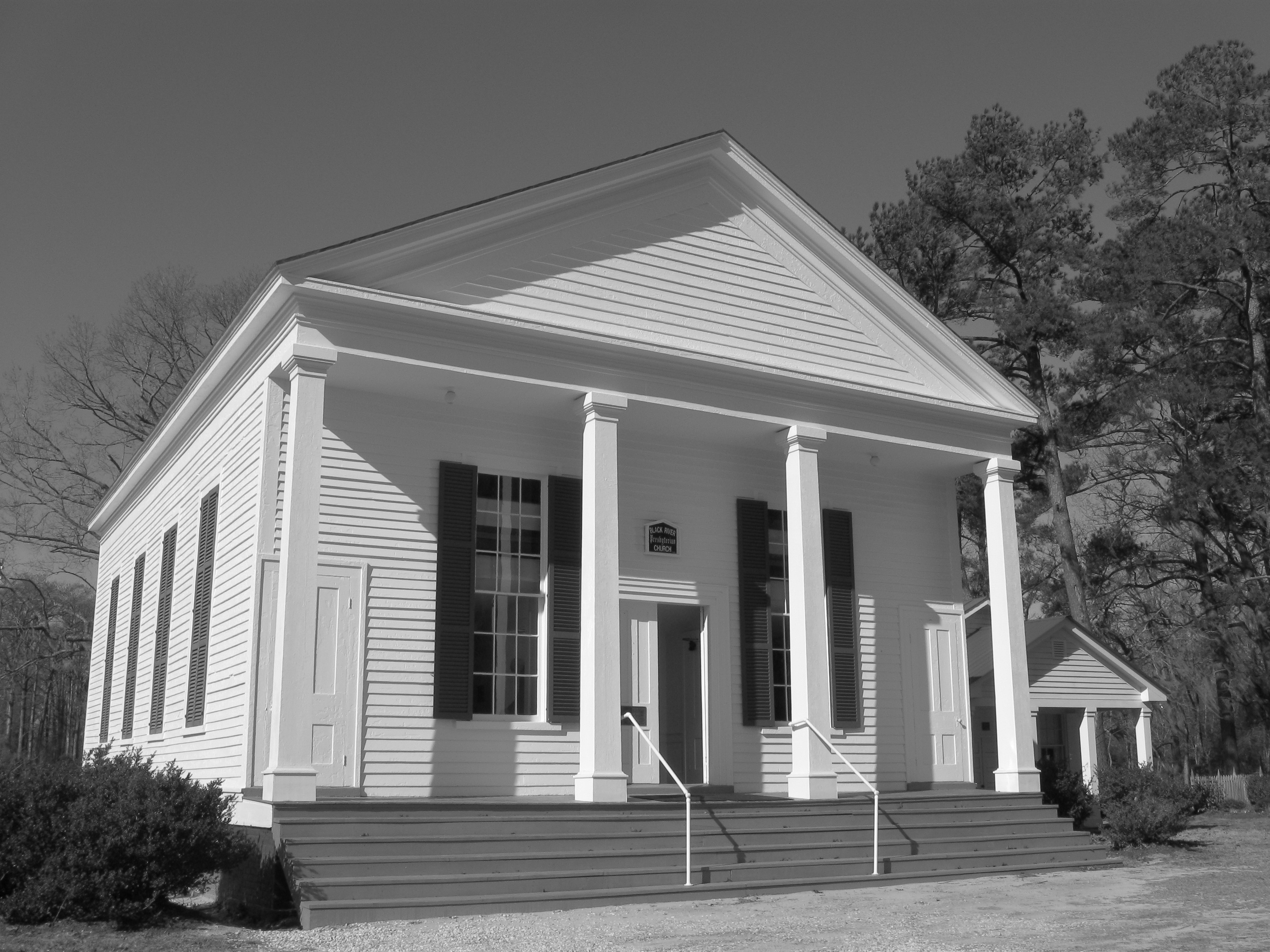
- Black River Presbyterian Church, February 2009

- Location within North Carolina Location within the United States
- Location: SR 1102 E of SR 1100, Ivanhoe, North Carolina
- Coordinates: 34°36′12″N 78°14′25″W
- Area: 7 acres (2.8 ha)
- Built: 1859
- Architectural style: Greek Revival, Gothic Revival
- MPS: Sampson County MRA
- NRHP reference No.: 86000550
- Added to NRHP: March 17, 1986

Black River Presbyterian and Ivanhoe Baptist Churches are historic Presbyterian and Baptist churches located on SR 1102 east of SR 1100 in Ivanhoe, Sampson County, North Carolina. Associated with each church is a cemetery. Among the founders of the Black River Presbyterian congregation were immigrants, from Isle of Arran, Patrick Murphy (1720-1785) and Elizabeth Kelso (1724-1798), who are buried in the Black River Presbyterian Church Cemetery. The original wooden markers for these graves, now in Sampson County History Museum, were replaced by marble stones. The current Black River Presbyterian Church structure was built in 1859, and is a one-story, temple form, Greek Revival style frame church with an impressive pillared portico. The Ivanhoe Baptist Church was built in 1893 or 1895, and is a vernacular Gothic Revival style frame church. The Presbyterian congregation was founded in 1740 by Scots from the Island of Arran and from mainland Scotland.

They were added to the National Register of Historic Places in 1986.
