= Delta Farm =

Historic farm in North Carolina, United States

- U.S. National Register of Historic Places
- Location within North Carolina Location within the United States
- Location: SR 1100 N of SR 1105, Ivanhoe, North Carolina
- Coordinates: 34°38′08″N 78°14′24″W
- Area: 444 acres (180 ha)
- Built: 1910
- Architectural style: Colonial Revival
- MPS: Sampson County MRA
- NRHP reference No.: 86000556
- Added to NRHP: March 17, 1986

Delta Farm, also known as the J.W. Scott Robinson Farm, is a historic home and farm located near Ivanhoe, Sampson County, North Carolina. The house was built in 1910, and is a two-story, five bay by four bay, double pile, Colonial Revival style frame dwelling. It has a hipped roof with front gable, brick pier foundation, and a front wrap-around porch. The interior features excellent woodwork. Also on the property are the contributing gas house, two-room servants-ironing house, two smokehouses, a storage house, root cellar, the remnants of the washhouse, and a former brick flower pit.

It was added to the National Register of Historic Places in 1986.
