= Conro Fiero House =

- Formerly listed on the U.S. National Register of Historic Places
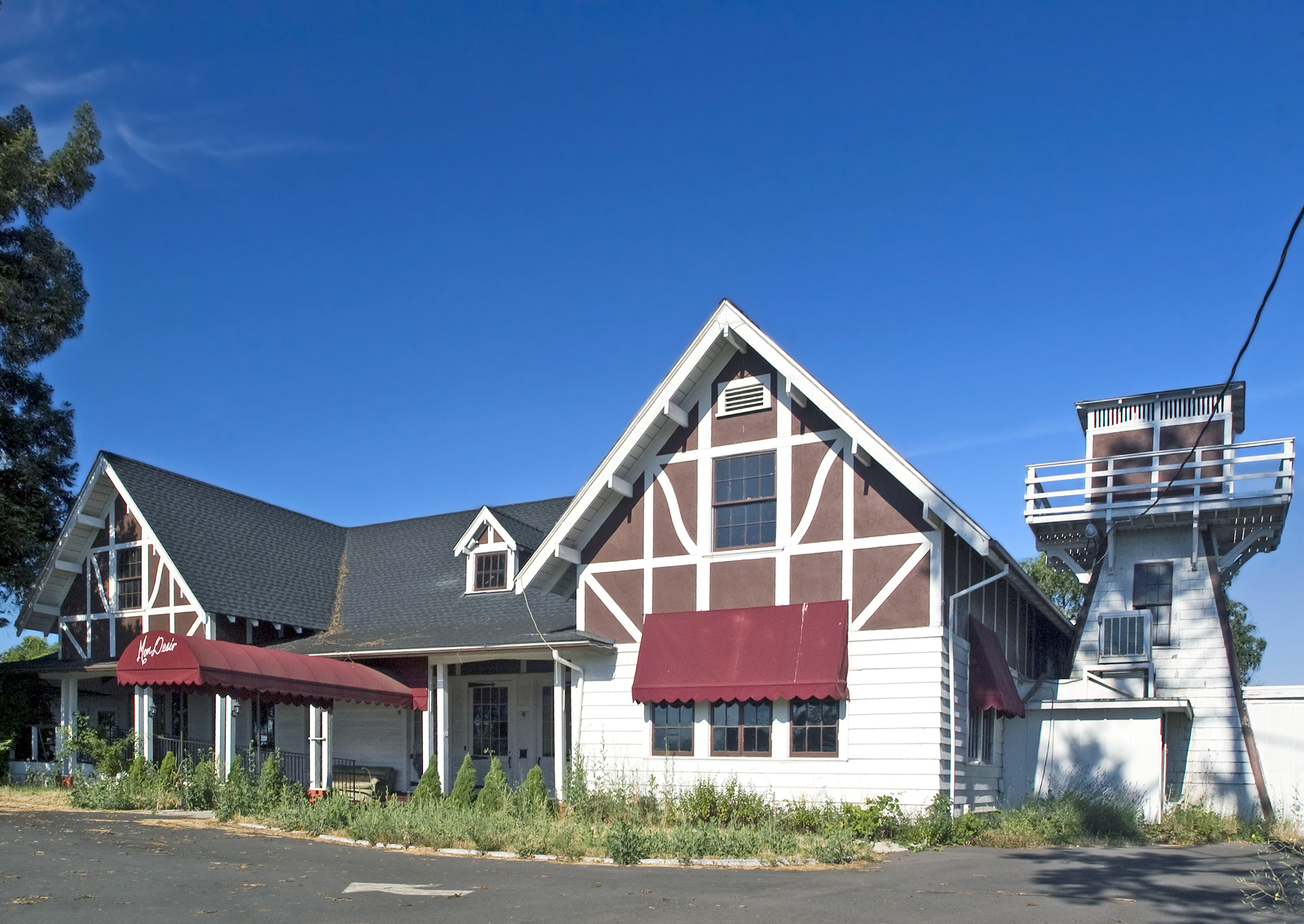
- The house in 2007
- Location: 4615 Hamrick Road; Central Point, Oregon
- Coordinates: 42°23′01″N 122°53′34″W
- Area: 2.5 acres (1.0 ha)
- Built: 1910
- Built by: Whitehouse & Fouilhoux
- Architectural style: Arts and Crafts style
- NRHP reference No.: 81000490

Significant dates
- Added to NRHP: December 9, 1981
- Removed from NRHP: June 1, 2011

The Conro Fiero House, also known as Woodlawn Acres and latterly as the Mon Desir restaurant, was a revival-style Tudor mansion built in 1910 by Conro Fiero. Originally listed on the National Register of Historic Places on December 9, 1981, it was delisted on June 1, 2011, following its destruction by fire.

== History ==
The original structure was built in 1910 by Conro Fiero, an orchardist, for his wife, Grace Andrews, a Broadway actress. Also known as Woodlawn Acres, the house was the main residence on a 140-acre (57 ha) estate which was referred to by its original owners as Woodlawn Orchard. They lost the property during World War I when the fruit industry became unstable.

From the mid 1940s the building began to be used as a restaurant, becoming one of the most historic restaurants in the Rogue Valley area over a period of about 50 years. George T. and Lillian E. Ehrheart acquired 6 acres (2.4 ha) of the estate, along with the house, in 1943, opening a restaurant that served "Southern-style chicken dinners" in 1946 but it closed within six months. Afterwards a fine-dining establishment was set up by Alex and Julie Tummers. It was the Tummers who first named their restaurant "Mon Desir" which means "my desire" in French. This restaurant remained in operation for ten years. The property was bought by Stanley and Tommie Smith in 1966 and they continued using it as a restaurant until 1979. They added a banquet room and an additional bar in the dining area. The popularity of the restaurant grew during this time as it was listed among the top 250 North American dining establishments.

"Mon Desir" then passed into the hands of Russ Walters from 1979 to the 1980s, and then to several other owners, eventually ceasing to function as a restaurant in 2005. It was purchased by the most recent owners, Edic Sliva and Lisa Tollner for $1.7 million in 2005. They bought the property along with other adjoining parcels of land, intending to turn the area into a development consisting of condominiums. Construction never got off the ground. Several other attempts to revive the structure were made. Karaokes were sometimes held there and attempts were made to film a horror movie in 2007 and 2008 but lack of funding stalled the effort. William Link also attempted to revive the old restaurant.

The house, located at 4615 Hamrick Road, Central Point, was listed on the National Register of Historic Places on December 9, 1981. On Monday January 11, 2010, an early morning fire destroyed the structure, causing it to be delisted on June 1, 2011.

== Design ==
Construction and design of the house is attributed to Whitehouse & Fouilhoux, owned by Morris H. Whitehouse and J. André Fouilhoux. It was a one-and-a-half-story bungalow built in the Arts and Crafts style. Construction was completed in 1910.

The main structure had a rectangular plan and faced Hamrick Road towards the east. It stood off some 60–100 feet (18–30 m) from the roadway by a lawn and a driveway. On either end of the front facade there was a projecting gabled roof with overhanging eaves, faced with barge boards. The upper half of the gables was decorated with timber in horizontal and s-curve shapes. The lower half of the facade was covered with weatherboards. Wings were added on either end towards the back in 1965 and 1968, giving it a U-shape. A lounge was added on one end and an enlarged kitchen towards the other.

Two-thirds of the front facade was taken up by a veranda with a sloping roof. The portion of the roof above the veranda was further enhanced with a gable-roofed dormer, decorated with bargeboards and a multi-paned window. The veranda consisted of paired columns. The entrance to the inside was from this veranda. There were three doors—the main door with doors on either side. Each door was hung with strapwork hinges believed to have been custom-made by Honeyman Hardware of Portland. The interior of the structure was finished with plaster and paneling. A chimney, faced with bricks, was also present.

Other features included a chimney stack in close proximity to the main structure, towards the southern end. Built of brick, the chimney also had a corbelled necking and a tapered flue liner. There are two double-hung windows. There was also a well house with a hipped roof towards the rear.
