= Anna Lewis Mann Old People's Home =

Historic building in Portland, Oregon, U.S.

- U.S. National Register of Historic Places
- Portland Historic Landmark
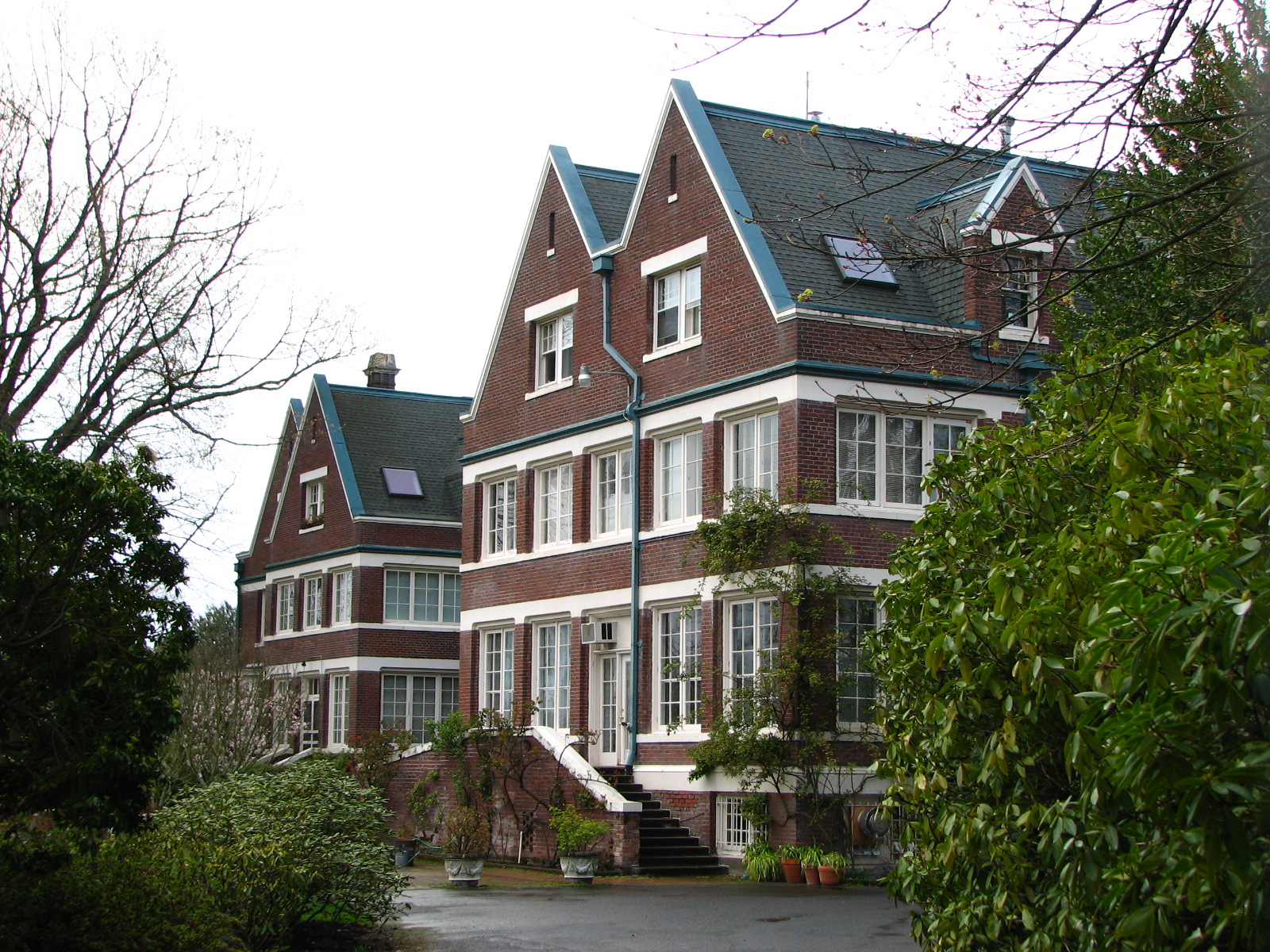

- Location within Portland, Oregon Location within Oregon Location within the United States
- Location: 1021 NE 33rd Avenue; Portland, Oregon
- Coordinates: 45°31′50″N 122°37′53″W
- Area: 3.1 acres (1.3 ha)
- Built: 1911
- Architect: Whitehouse & Foulihoux
- Architectural style: Tudor Revival
- NRHP reference No.: 92001380
- Added to NRHP: October 15, 1992

The Anna Lewis Mann Old People's Home is building complex located in northeast Portland, Oregon listed on the National Register of Historic Places.

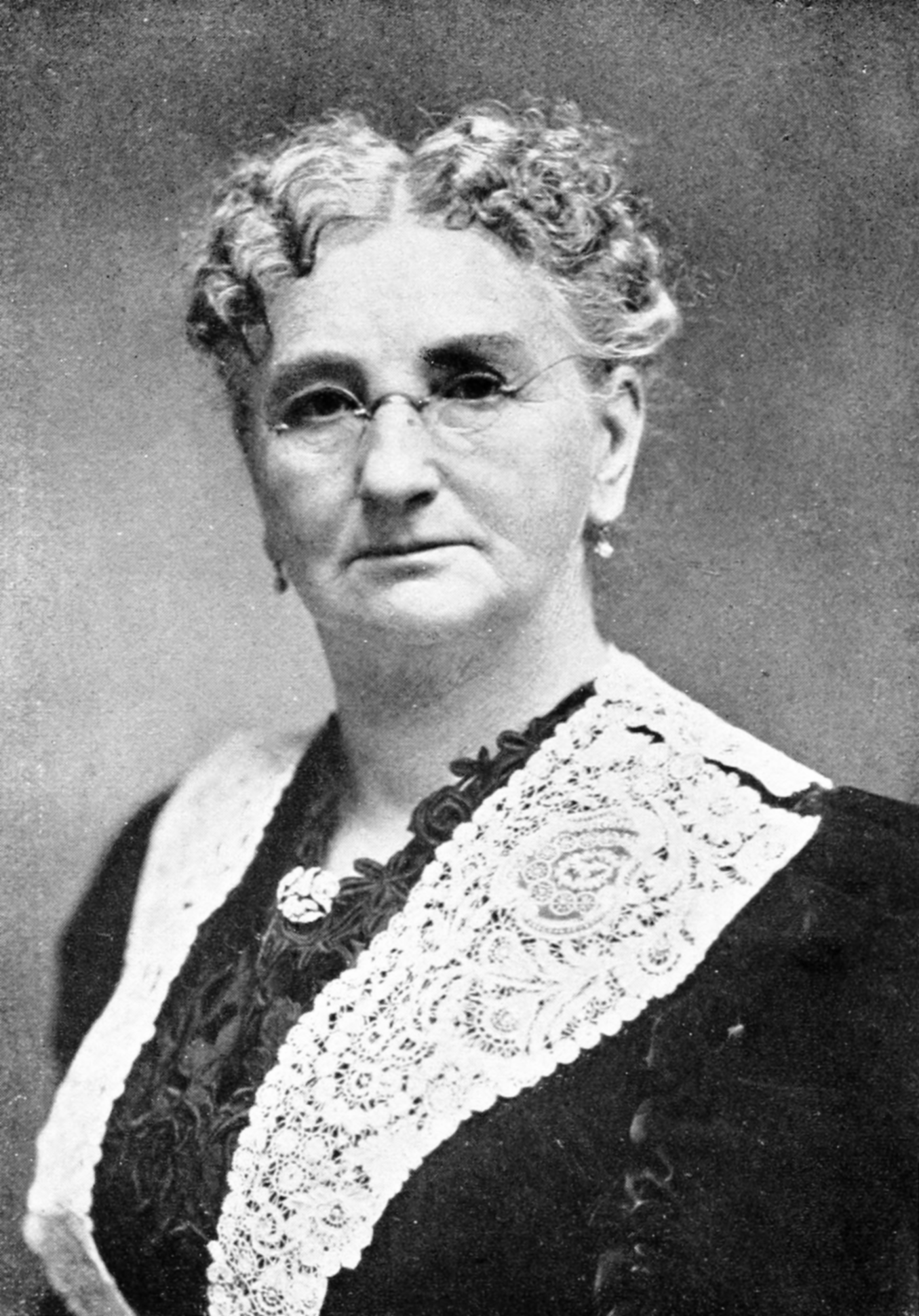
Anna Mary Lewis Mann

Portland's Old Ladies' Home Society, organized on March 3, 1893, by pioneer Mary H. Holbrook, was referred to as the "prototype" for the Old People's Home in Gaston's "Portland, Oregon..." (1911). It was supported by charitable donations, the must substantial of which came from Henry W. Corbett and Amanda Reed. But the costs exceeded expectations. In 1908 Peter John Mann offered to purchase property and construct the home, under the condition that it serve all people, not just women. After Mann's death, his wife, Anna Mary E. Mann, carried forward his wishes by contributing a large portion of their estate to the cause. The building was completed by 1919.

== See also ==
- National Register of Historic Places listings in Northeast Portland, Oregon
