= Wah Gwin Gwin Falls =

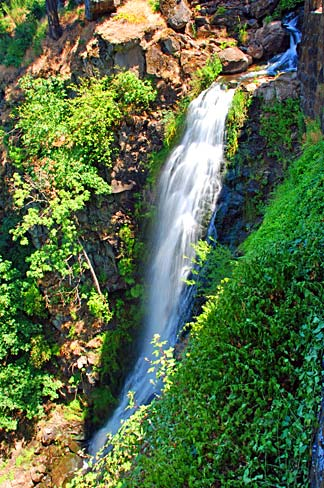
- Wah Gwin Gwin Falls in the summer
- Interactive map of Wah Gwin Gwin Falls
- Location: Hood River County, Oregon, U.S.
- Coordinates: 45.71194°N 121.55333°W
- Type: Horsetail
- Elevation: 265 ft (81 m)
- Total height: 207 ft (63 m)
- Number of drops: 1
- Average width: 10 ft (3 m)
- Average flow rate: 35 cu ft/s (0.99 m^{3}/s)

Wah Gwin Gwin Falls, also known as Lullaby Falls, is a waterfall of Phelps Creek located in the property of the historic Columbia Gorge Hotel, in Hood River County, in the U.S. state of Oregon. The waterfall is notable for its main drop of 207 feet (63 m) that plunges through steep cascades into the Columbia River, south of the city of Hood River, Oregon.

The waterfall runs next to a terrace built along the edge of the back side of the hotel. The terrace is flanked by a wall built with the same masonry ashlar technique of the entry way of the hotel.

== History ==
The name of the waterfall and the hotel with the same name that once sat on the lot prior to the Columbia Gorge Hotel may have stemmed from a Native American word that means "rushing waters".

== See also ==
- List of waterfalls in Oregon
