= Sixth Church of Christ, Scientist (Portland, Oregon) =

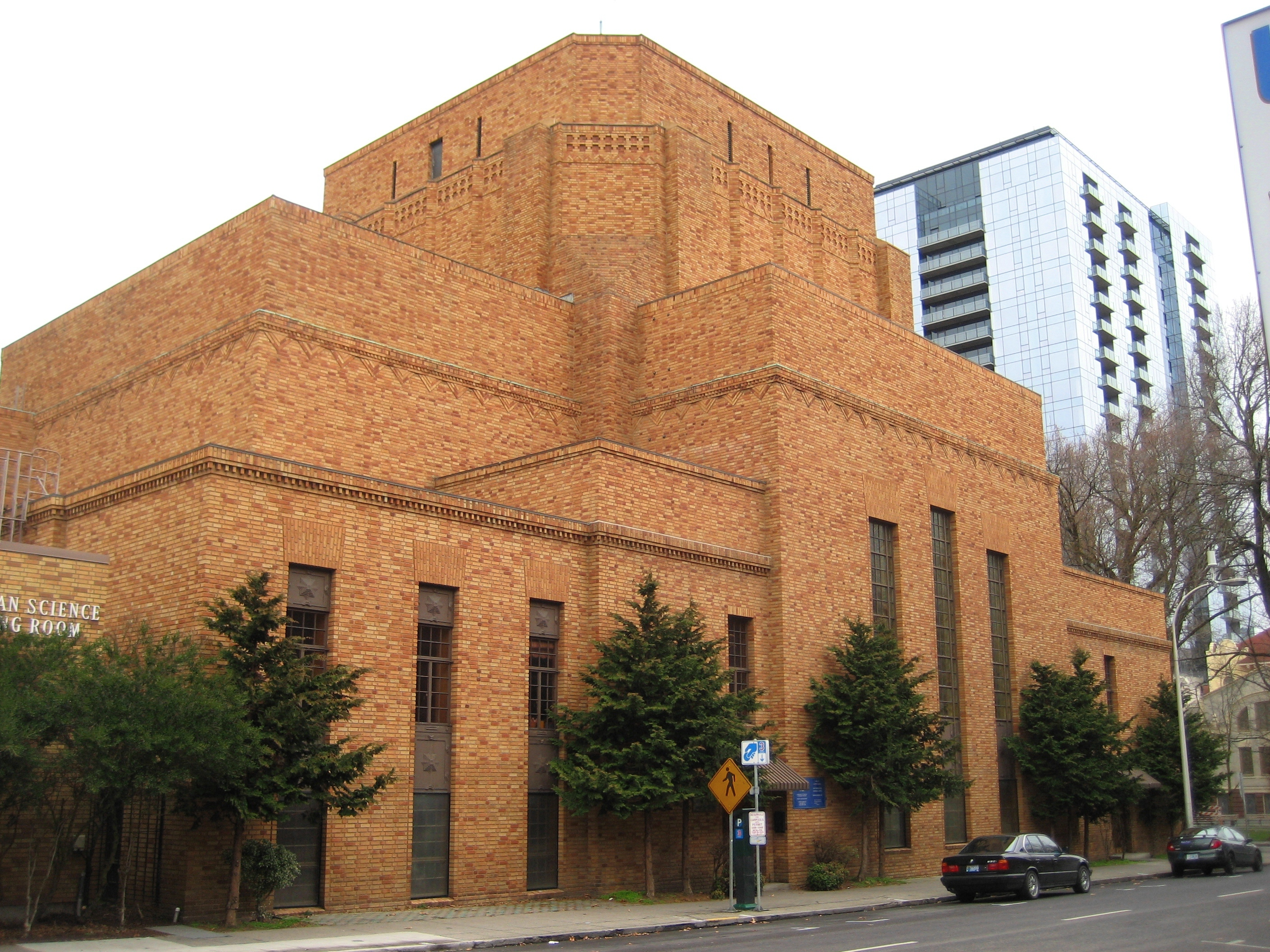
- Interactive map of the Sixth Church of Christ, Scientist area

General information
- Location: United States
- Coordinates: 45°30′55″N 122°41′02″W
- Completed: 1932
- Client: Sixth Church of Christ, scientist, Portland
- Sixth Church of Christ, Scientist, Library
- Oregon Historic Site
- Built: 1932
- Architect: Morris H. Whitehouse; Water Church
- Architectural style: Art Deco

The Sixth Church of Christ, Scientist is a historic Christian Science church located in Downtown Portland, Oregon. Located at 1331 SW Park Ave., it is the largest Christian Science church currently in use in Oregon.

A Christian Science Reading Room is attached to the southwest corner of the building.

== History ==
Built in 1932 during the Great Depression, the building was designed by Morris H. Whitehouse. The congregation requested the architects include as much handiwork as possible when building the church. The brickwork of the building's exterior was laid by hand and the pews were hand carved. The building cost $350,000 (the equivalent of $7,863,223 in today's money) and was inspired by the addition to The First Church of Christ, Scientist in Boston, Massachusetts.

The organ was built in 1931 by Austin Organs of Hartford, Connecticut.

The interior was restored in 1996. The restoration included re-painting, re-carpeting, and restoration of the ceiling artwork in the chapel.

== Gallery ==
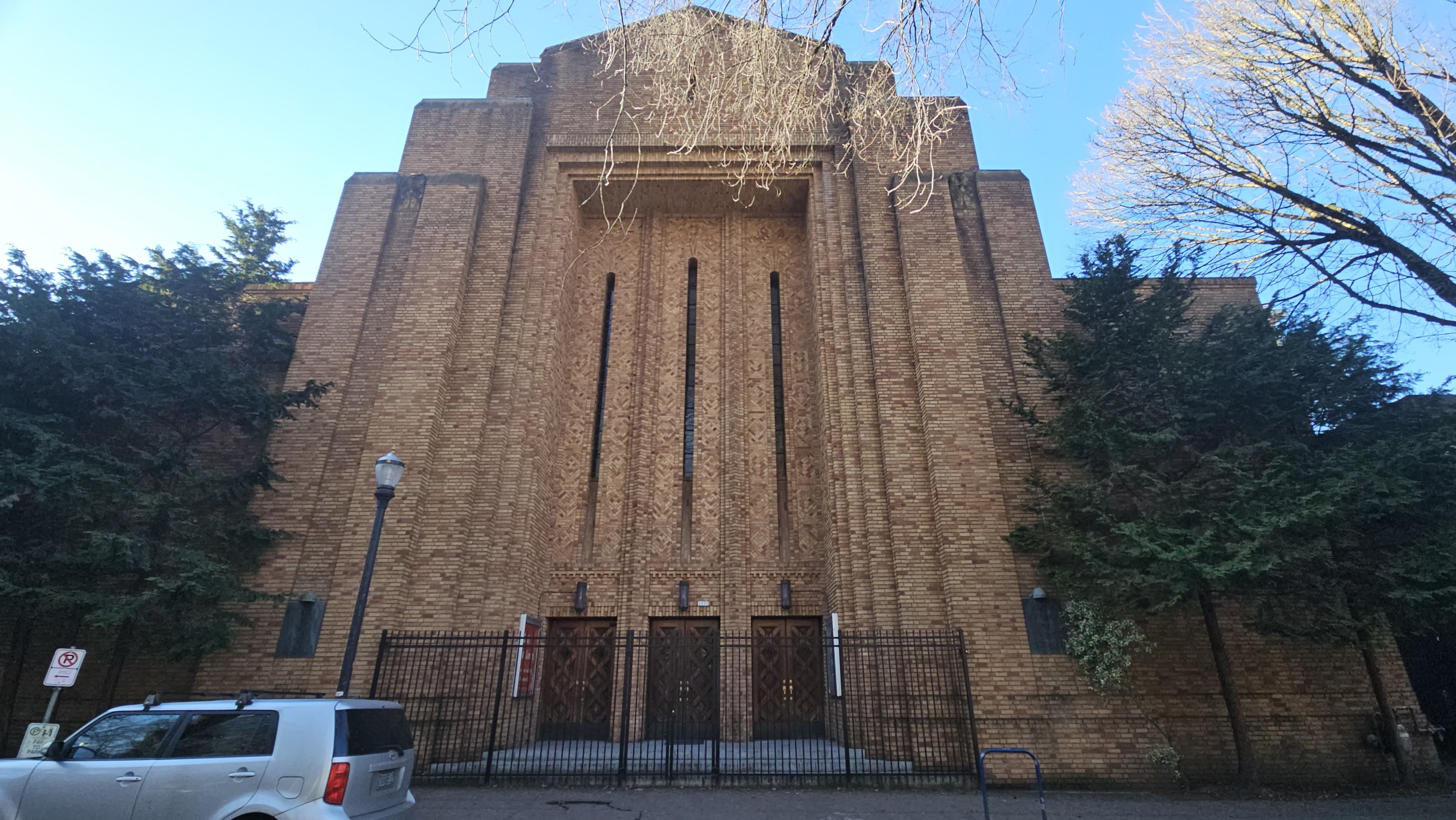
Front facade

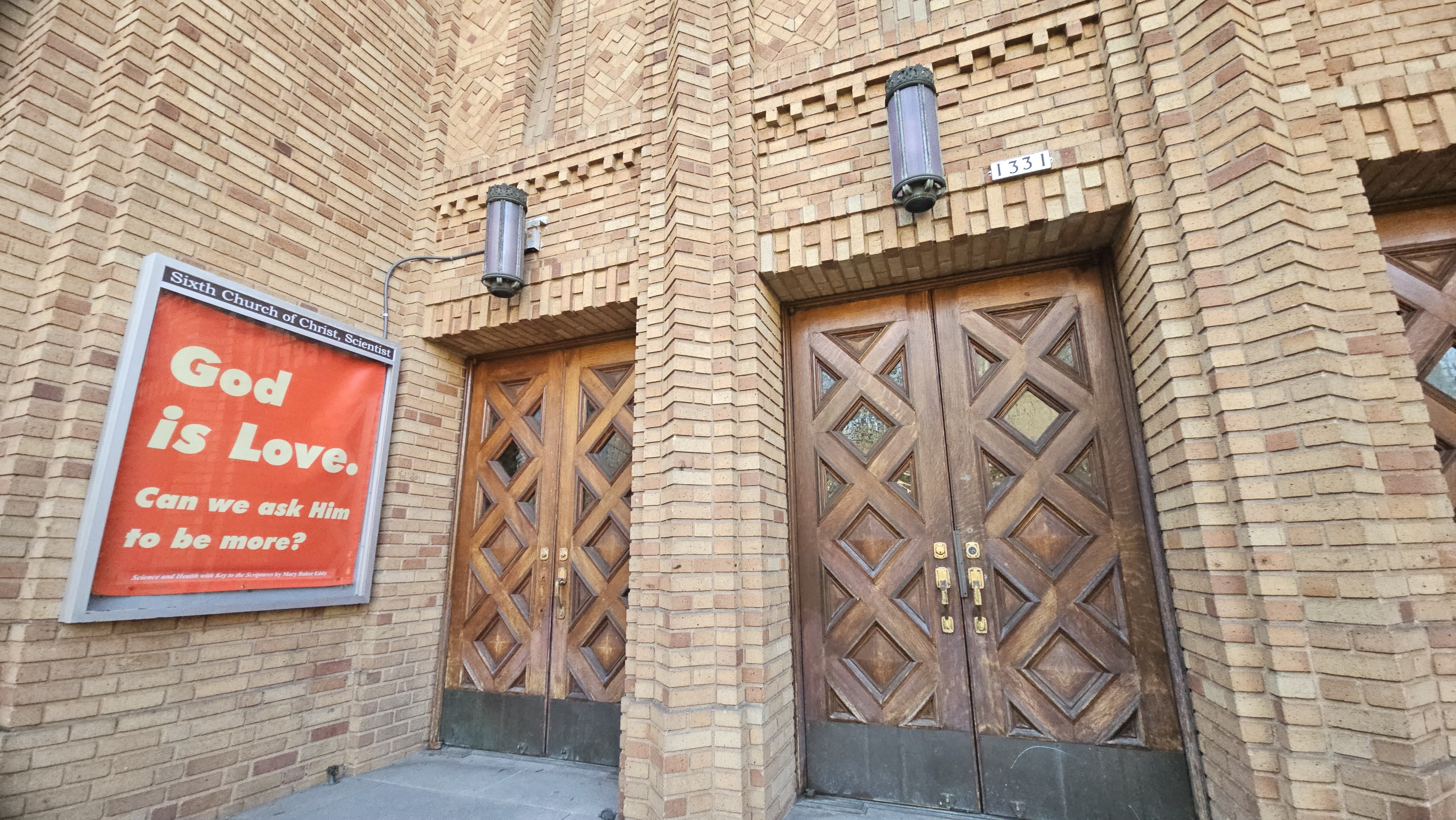
Front doors
