= 705 Davis Street Apartments =

Historic building in Portland, Oregon, U.S.

- Seven Hundred Five Davis Street Apartments
- U.S. National Register of Historic Places
- U.S. Historic district – Contributing property
- Portland Historic Landmark
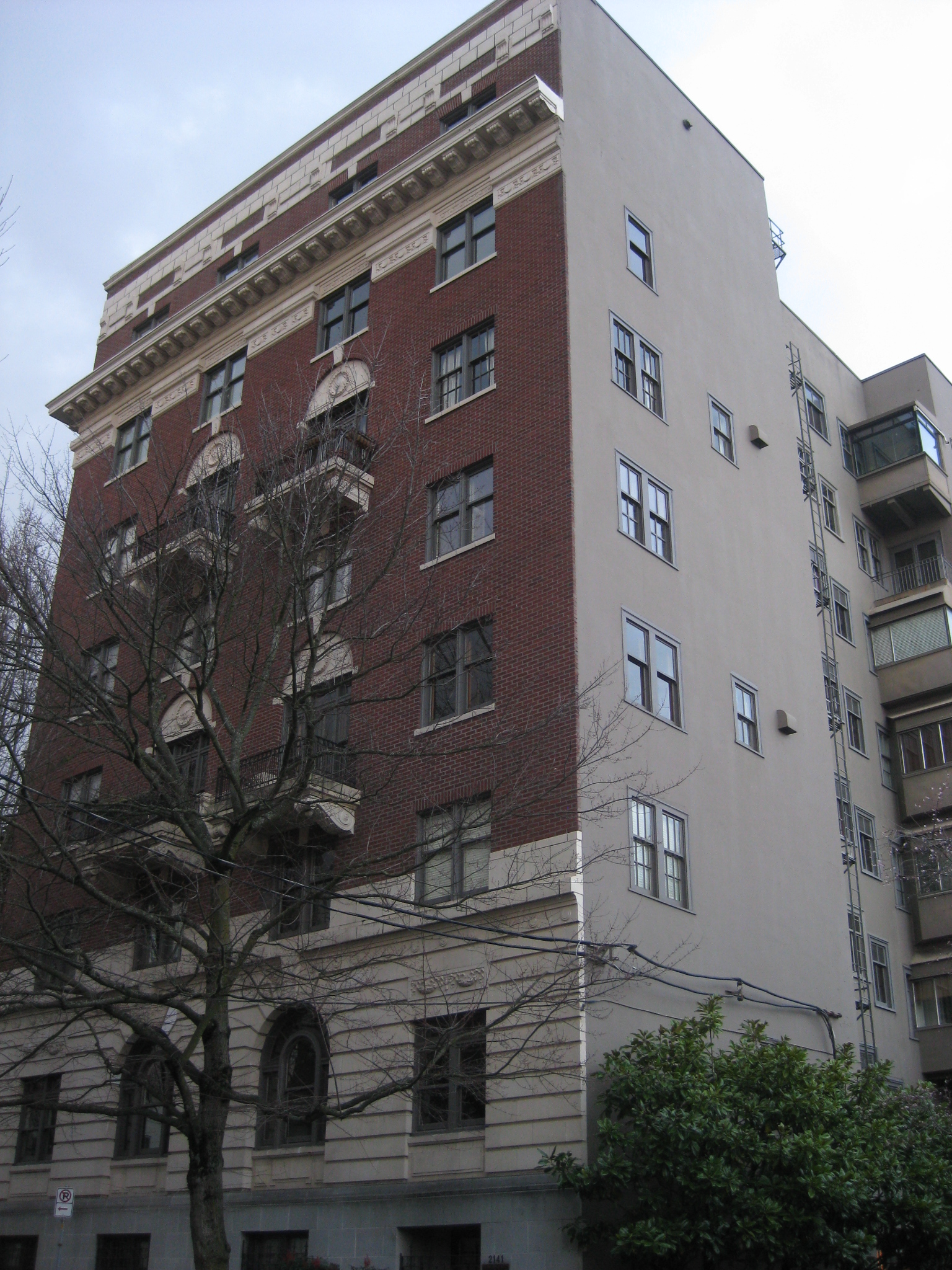
- The building's exterior in 2010

- Location within Portland, Oregon Location within Oregon Location within the United States
- Location: 2141 NW Davis Street; Portland, Oregon
- Coordinates: 45°31′28″N 122°41′43″W
- Area: 0.3 acres (0.12 ha)
- Built: 1912–13
- Architect: Whitehouse & Fouilhoux
- Architectural style: French Renaissance
- Part of: Alphabet Historic District (ID00001293)
- NRHP reference No.: 80003374
- Added to NRHP: October 10, 1980

The 705 Davis Street Apartments (also known as Seven Hundred Five Davis Street Apartments or simply 705 Davis) is a historic residential building located at 2141 Northwest Davis Street in Portland, Oregon, United States. It was designed by Morris H. Whitehouse and J. André Fouilhoux via the firm Whitehouse & Fouilhoux, and was completed in 1913. It quickly became one of Portland's most fashionable addresses due to its fine design and materials and large rooms. Its original owner, Julia Hoffman (1856–1934), was a major figure in the Portland arts community, both as practitioner and advocate. (Note: Julia Hoffman's son Lee Hawley Hoffman was the founder of Hoffman Construction Company.) She lived in the building's penthouse until her death.

It has terra cotta exterior details.

The building was added to the National Register of Historic Places on October 10, 1980.

== See also ==
- National Register of Historic Places listings in Northwest Portland, Oregon
