= Balfour–Guthrie Building =

Historic building in Portland, Oregon, U.S.

- U.S. National Register of Historic Places
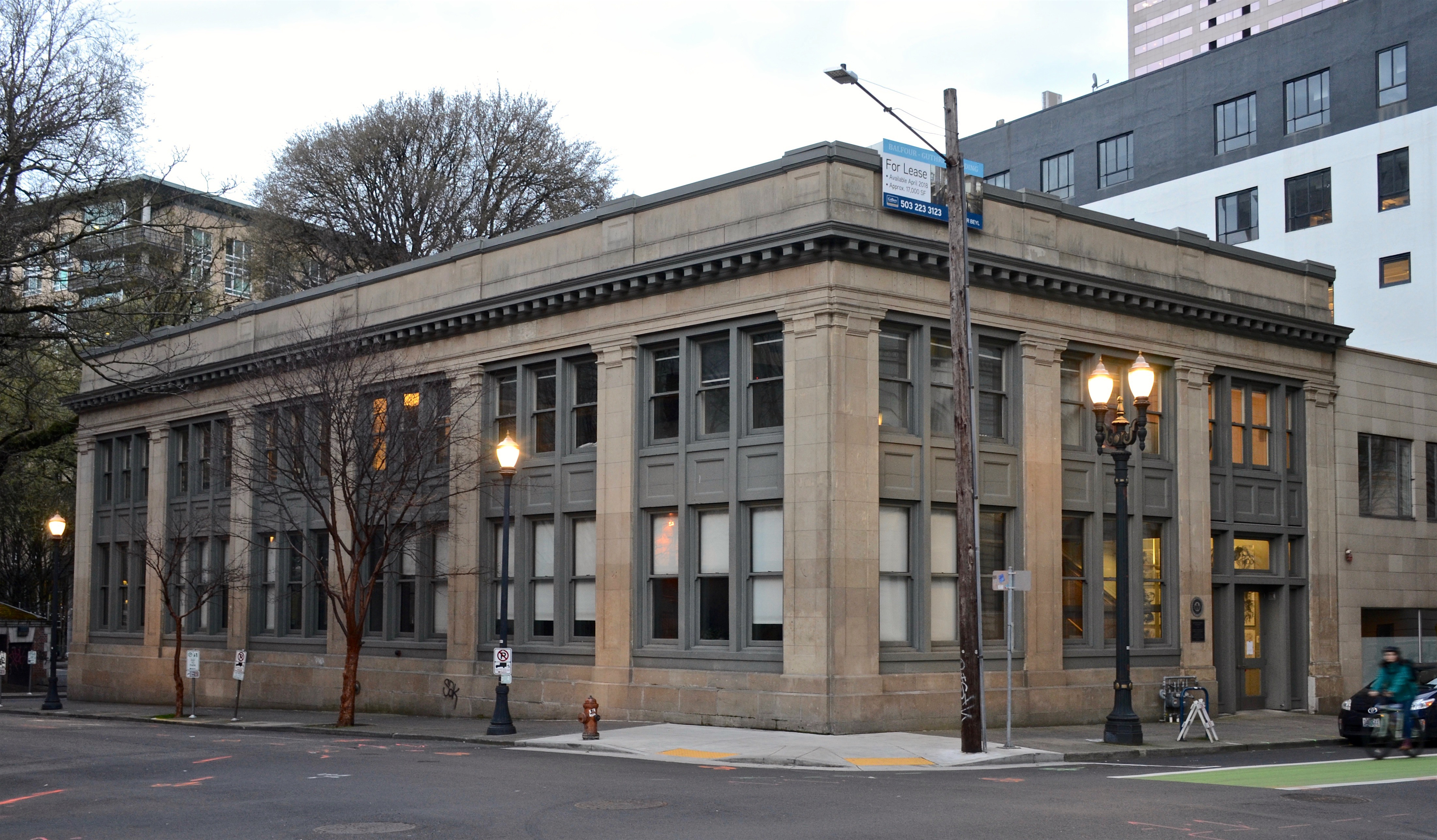
- Viewed from the southwest in 2018

- Location within Portland, Oregon Location within Oregon Location within the United States
- Location: 733 SW Oak Street; Portland, Oregon
- Coordinates: 45°31′21″N 122°40′44″W
- Area: 0.1 acres (0.040 ha)
- Built: 1913
- Architect: Morris H. Whitehouse
- Architectural style: Classical Revival
- NRHP reference No.: 02000824
- Added to NRHP: August 1, 2002

The Balfour–Guthrie Building is a building located in downtown Portland, Oregon, listed on the National Register of Historic Places.

== See also ==
- National Register of Historic Places listings in Southwest Portland, Oregon
