= Ivanhoe, North Carolina =

Ivanhoe
- CDP
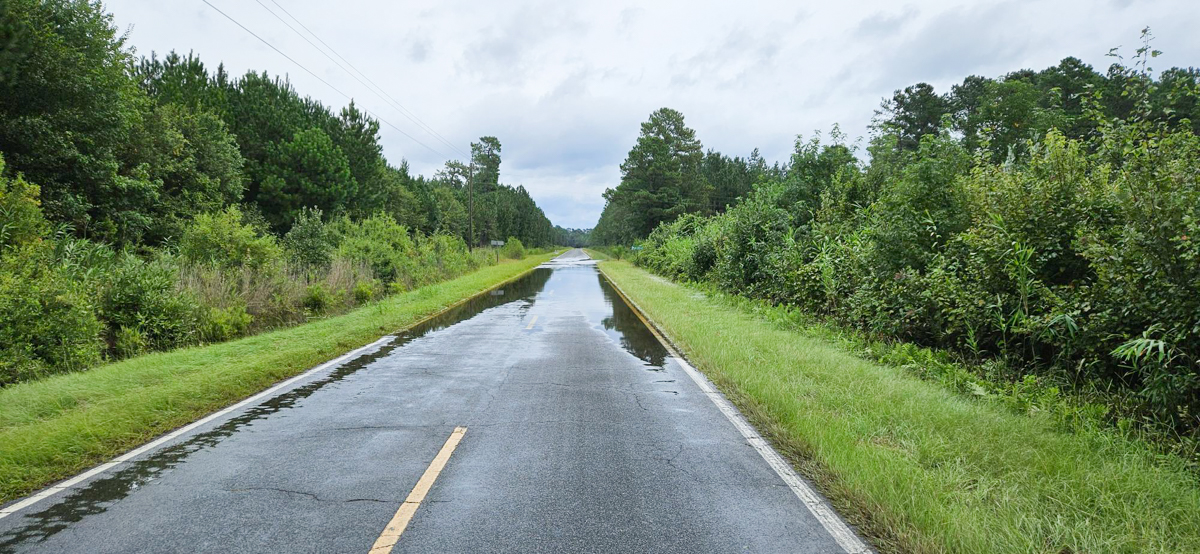
- Eddie L. Jones Road in Ivanhoe, after Hurricane Idalia (August 2023)

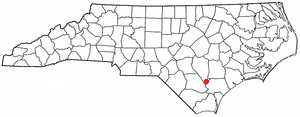
- Location within the U.S. state of North Carolina
- Coordinates: 34°35′13″N 78°14′41″W
- Country: United States
- State: North Carolina
- County: Sampson
- Named for: Ivanhoe (1819 novel)

Area
  - Total: 5.03 sq mi (13.03 km^{2})
  - Land: 5.02 sq mi (13.01 km^{2})
  - Water: 0.0077 sq mi (0.02 km^{2})
- Elevation: 69 ft (21 m)

Population (2020)
  - Total: 198
  - Density: 39.4/sq mi (15.22/km^{2})
- Time zone: UTC-5 (EST)
  - Summer (DST): UTC-4 (EDT)
- ZIP code: 28447
- Area codes: 910, 472
- FIPS code: 37-33940
- GNIS feature ID: 2402625

Ivanhoe is a census-designated place (CDP) in Sampson County, North Carolina, United States. The population was 198 at the 2020 census.

== History ==
The area of Sampson County that contains present-day Ivanhoe was first settled by the Scots in 1739, who travelled northwest through the lower Cape Fear Valley. The Scots stopping in Ivanhoe discovered a cash crop in abundance; the longleaf pine. The local economy soon consisted of tar, charcoal, turpentine, and timber. The Black River served as their connection to the seaport; located first at Brunswick Town and later Wilmington.

The Beatty-Corbett House, Black River Presbyterian and Ivanhoe Baptist Churches, and Delta Farm were listed on the National Register of Historic Places in 1986.

== Geography ==
According to the United States Census Bureau, the CDP has a total area of 5.03 square miles (13.0 km^{2}), of which 5.02 square miles is land and 0.01 square miles is water.

The community is located 29 miles south of Clinton, and 34 miles northwest of Wilmington.

Ivanhoe is within the Franklin Township in Sampson County.

The ZIP Code for Ivanhoe is 28447.

== Demographics ==
Historical population
Census	Pop.	Note	%±
2000	311		—
2010	264		−15.1%
2020	198		−25.0%
U.S. Decennial Census

=== 2020 census ===
Ivanhoe racial composition
Race	Number	Percentage
White (non-Hispanic)	40	20.20%
Black or African American (non-Hispanic)	138	69.70%
Native American	1	0.51%
Asian	0	0.00%
Pacific Islander	0	0.00%
Other/Mixed	19	9.60%
Hispanic or Latino	23	11.62%

=== 2000 census ===
As of the census of 2000, there were 311 people, 113 households, and 83 families residing in the CDP. The population density was 61.9 people per square mile (23.9 people/km^{2}). There were 123 housing units at an average density of 24.5 per square mile (9.5/km^{2}). The racial makeup of the CDP was 21.54% White, 70.74% African American, 0.32% Native American, 0.64% Asian, 6.11% from other races, and 0.64% from two or more races. Hispanic or Latino of any race were 8.68% of the population.

There were 113 households, out of which 35.4% had children under the age of 18 living with them, 49.6% were married couples living together, 19.5% had a female householder with no husband present, and 26.5% were non-families. 22.1% of all households were made up of individuals, and 12.4% had someone living alone who was 65 years of age or older. The average household size was 2.61 and the average family size was 3.10.

In the CDP, the population was spread out, with 26.7% under the age of 18, 6.8% from 18 to 24, 30.2% from 25 to 44, 22.5% from 45 to 64, and 13.8% who were 65 years of age or older. The median age was 39 years. For every 100 females, there were 98.1 males. For every 100 females age 18 and over, there were 101.8 males.

The median income for a household in the CDP was $22,500, and the median income for a family was $32,917. Males had a median income of $20,000 versus $18,458 for females. The per capita income for the CDP was $11,305. About 6.8% of families and 6.2% of the population were below the poverty line, including none of those under age 18 and 16.3% of those age 65 or over.
