= Trylon and Perisphere =

1939 New York World's Fair structures

Coordinates: 40.7463°N 73.8451°W

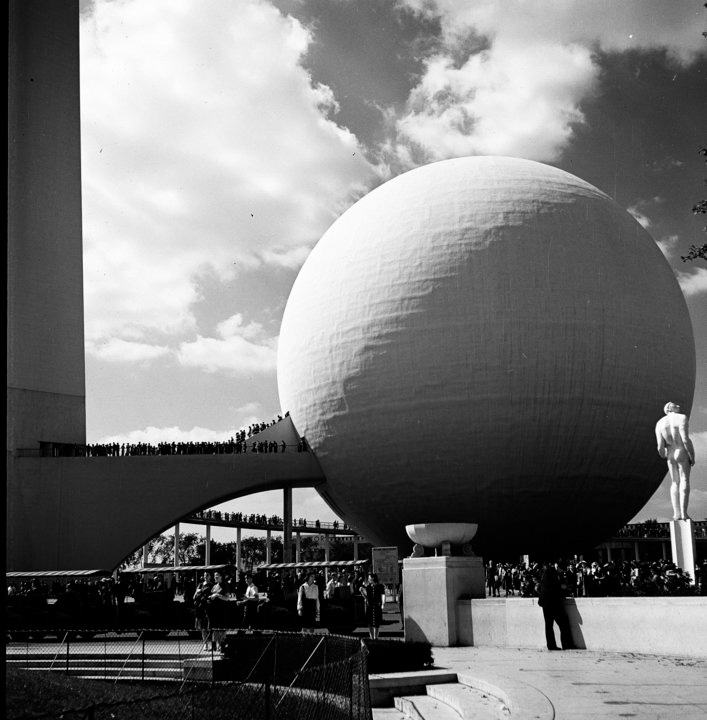
Perisphere photo by Leo Husick

The Trylon and Perisphere were two monumental modernistic structures designed by architects Wallace Harrison and J. Andre Fouilhoux that were together known as the Theme Center of the 1939 New York World's Fair at Flushing Meadows–Corona Park in Queens, New York City, United States. The Perisphere was a tremendous sphere, 180 feet (55 m) in diameter, connected to the 610-foot (190 m) spire-shaped Trylon by what was at the time the world's longest escalator. The Perisphere housed a diorama by Henry Dreyfuss called Democracity which, in keeping with the fair's theme "The World of Tomorrow", depicted a utopian city-of-the-future. The interior display was viewed from above on a moving sidewalk, while a multi-image slide presentation was projected on the dome of the sphere. After exiting the Perisphere, visitors descended to ground level on the third element of the Theme Center, the Helicline, a 950-foot-long (290 m) spiral ramp that partially encircled the Perisphere.

The name "Perisphere" was coined using the Greek prefix peri-, meaning "all around", "about", or "enclosing". The name "Trylon" was coined from the phrase "triangular pylon".

== Construction ==
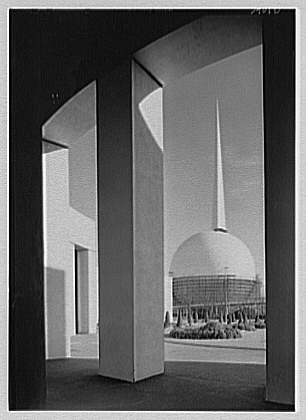
Trylon, Perisphere and Helicline photo by Sam Gottscho

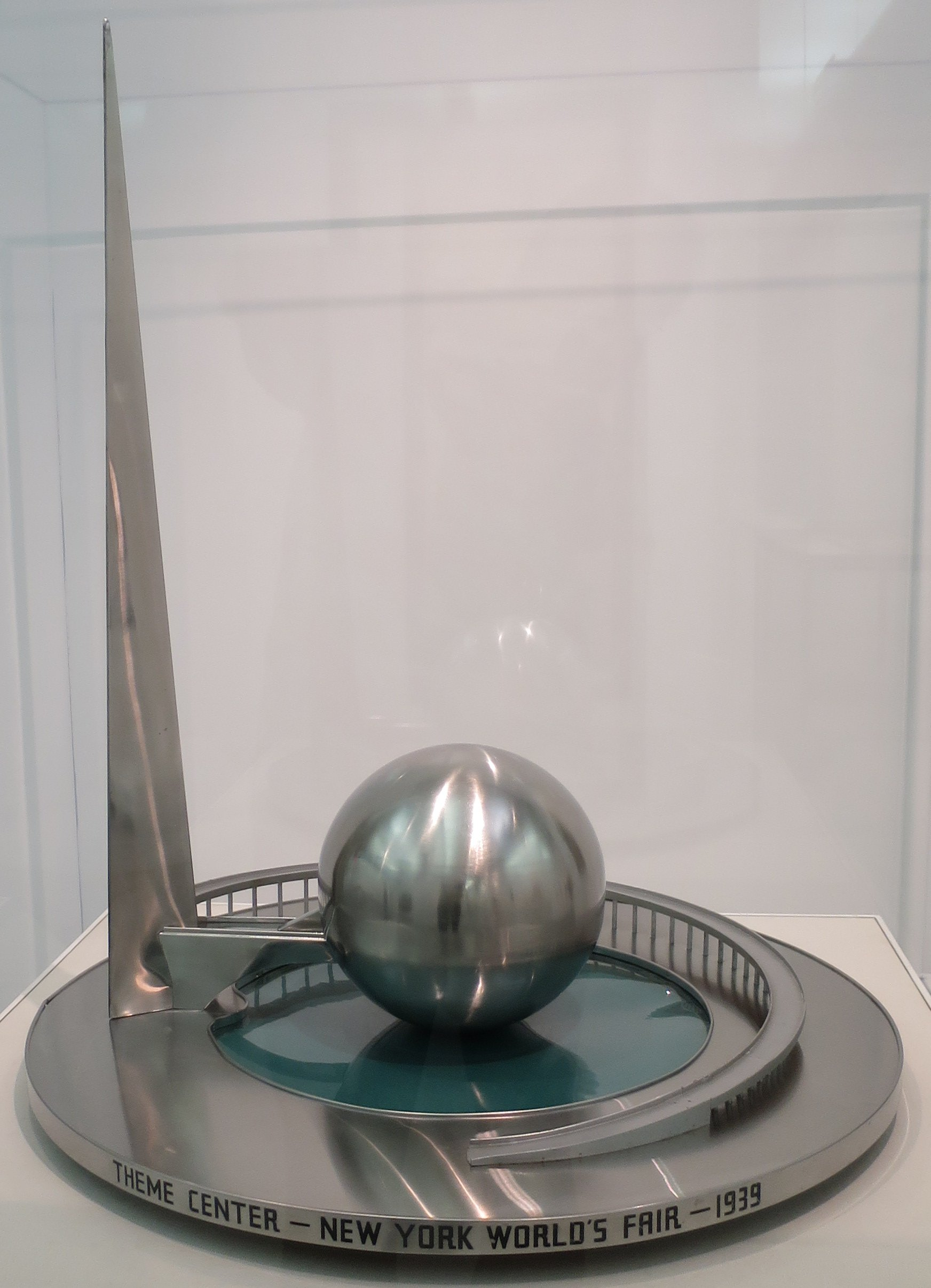
Model for Trylon and Perisphere (1938)

The Theme Center was designed by architects Wallace Harrison and J. Andre Fouilhoux, with the interior exhibit by Henry Dreyfuss. The structures were built in Flushing Meadows Park in Queens, New York and were intended as temporary with steel framing and plaster board facades. Both buildings were subsequently razed and scrapped after the closing of the fair, their materials to be used in World War II armaments.

== Legacy ==
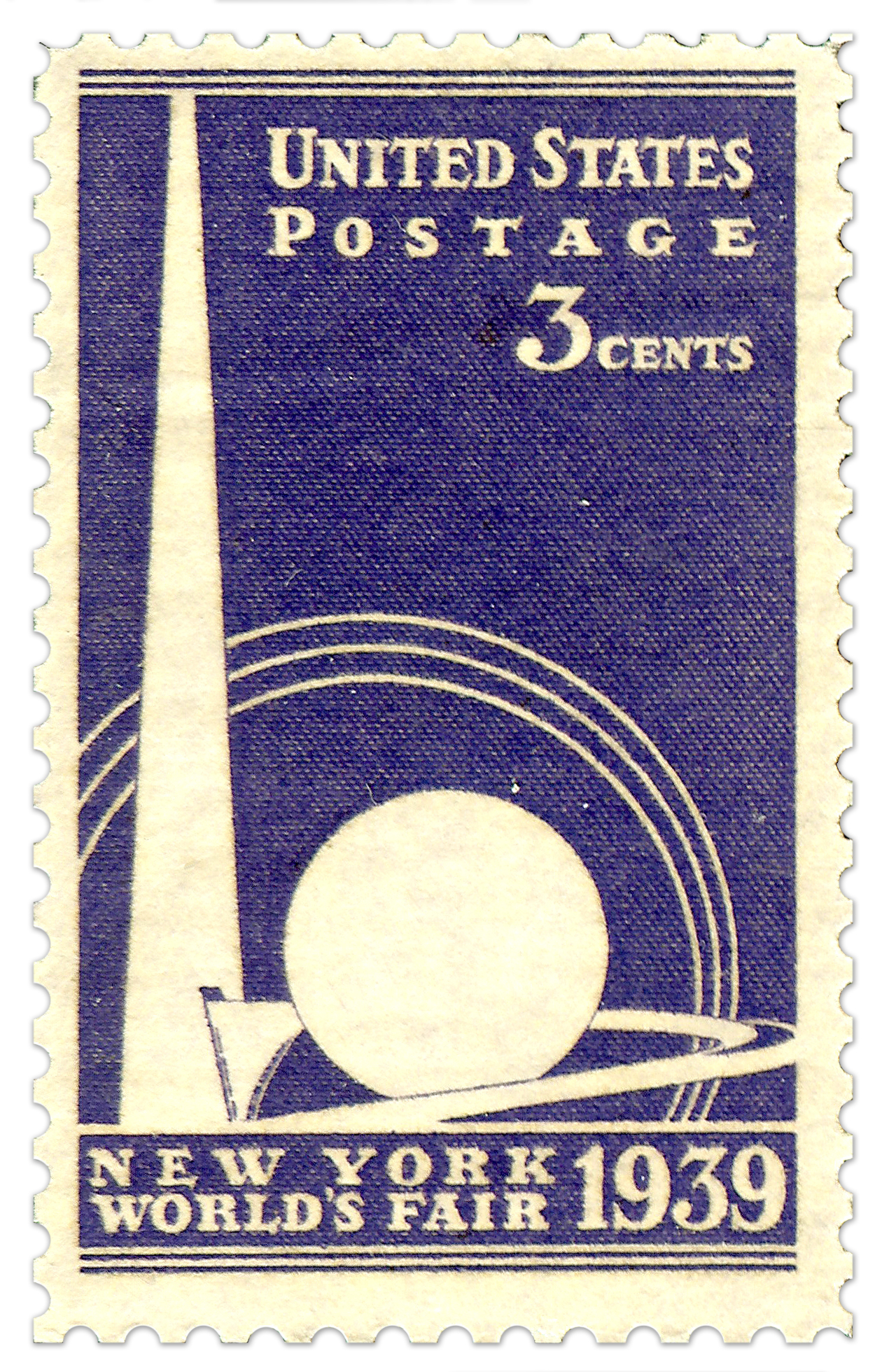
Trylon and Perisphere on US stamp from 1939.

The Trylon and Perisphere became the central symbol of the 1939 World's Fair, its image reproduced by the millions on a wide range of promotional materials and serving as the fairground's focal point. The United States Postal Service issued a postage stamp in 1939 depicting the Trylon and Perisphere. Neither structure survives; however, the Unisphere, the symbol of the 1964–65 New York World's Fair, is now located where the Perisphere once stood. Both structures are featured on the cover art of the Deltron 3030 album “3030”.

== See also ==
- 1939 New York World's Fair pavilions and attractions
- Skylon (tower) at the 1951 Festival of Britain
- Unisphere at the 1964 New York World's Fair
