= University Club (Portland, Oregon) =

Historic building and social club in Portland, Oregon, U.S.

- University Club of Portland
- U.S. National Register of Historic Places
- Portland Historic Landmark
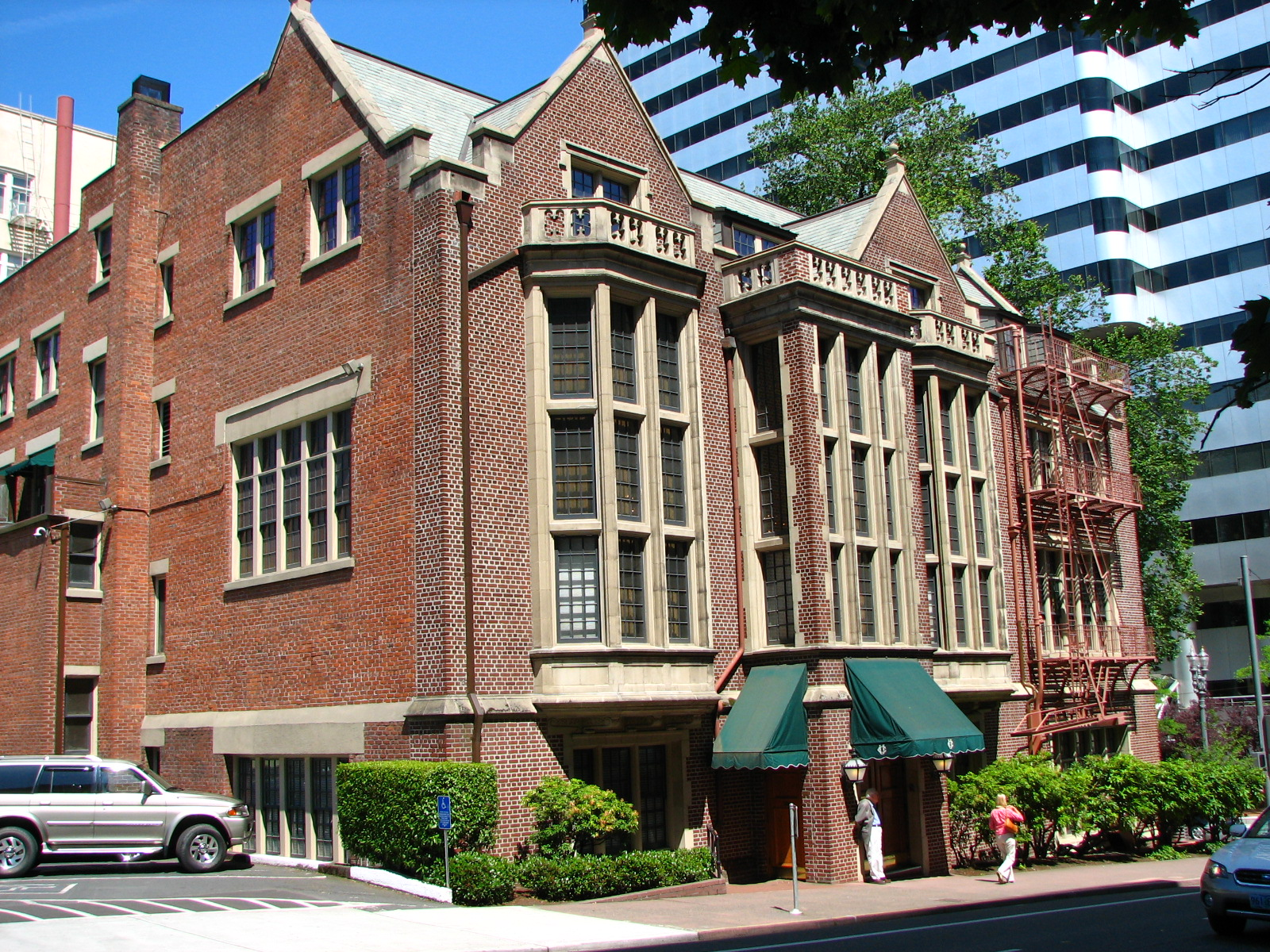
- The University Club of Portland building in 2009

- Location within Portland, Oregon
- Location: 1225 SW 6th Avenue; Portland, Oregon
- Coordinates: 45°30′55″N 122°40′52″W
- Built: 1913; 113 years ago
- Architect: Whitehouse & Fouilhoux
- Architectural style: Tudor Revival, Jacobethan Revival
- NRHP reference No.: 79002144
- Added to NRHP: July 26, 1979

The University Club of Portland is a private social club that was established in 1898 located in downtown Portland, Oregon. It is known as "Portland's Premier Private Social Club". The clubhouse was built in 1913 and is listed on the National Register of Historic Places.

In 2017, the University Club voted in its first female president, Elizabeth Schleuning.

== See also ==
- National Register of Historic Places listings in Southwest Portland, Oregon
- List of traditional gentlemen's clubs in the United States
