= Elliott R. Corbett House =

House in Multnomah County, Oregon, U.S.

- U.S. National Register of Historic Places
- Portland Historic Landmark
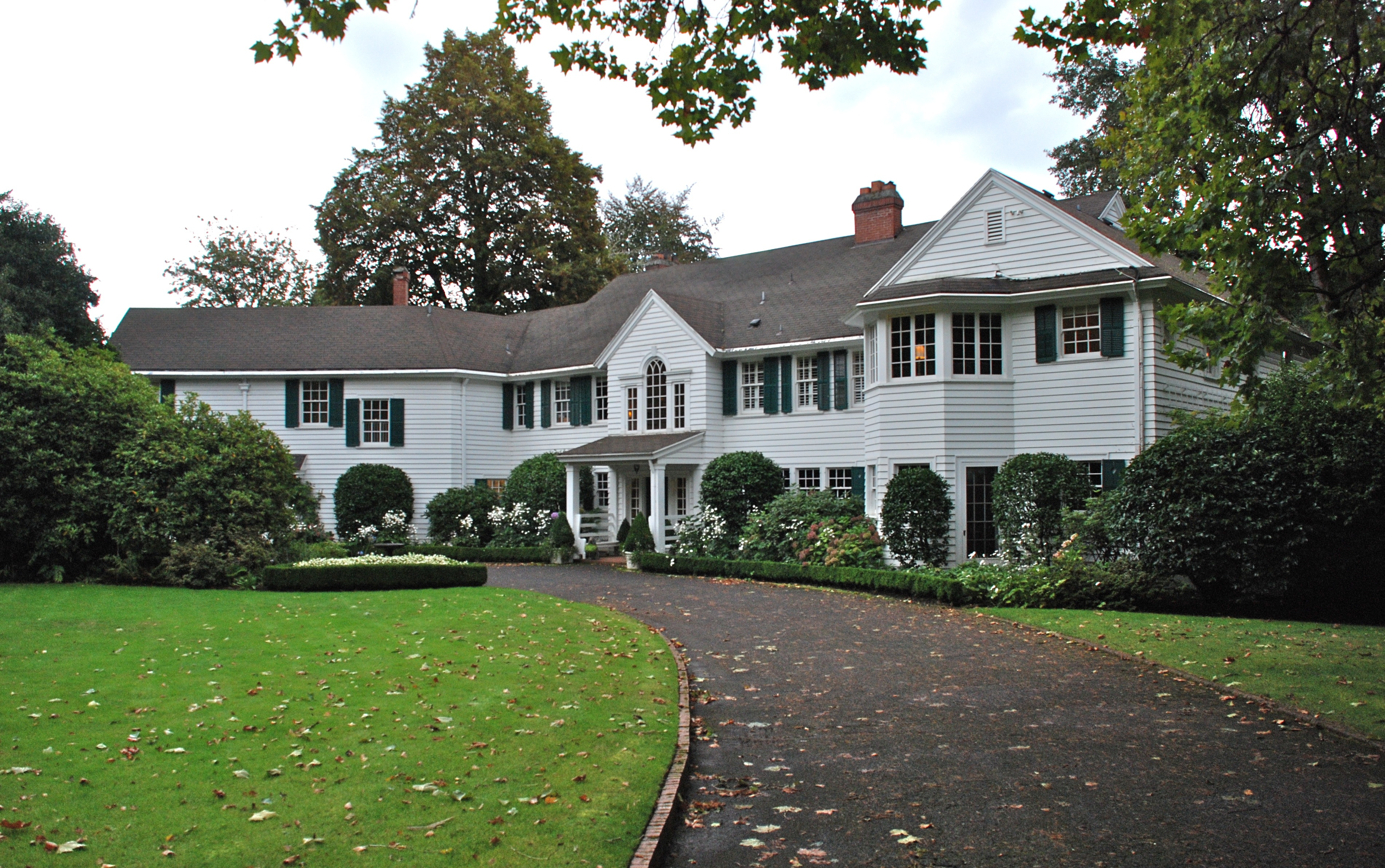
- The Corbett House in 2013

- Location within Oregon
- Location: 01600 SW Greenwood Road; Portland, Oregon
- Coordinates: 45.433669°N 122.662073°W
- Area: 1.77 acres (0.72 ha)
- Built: 1915
- Built by: McHolland Brothers
- Architect: Whitehouse and Fouilhoux
- Architectural style: Colonial Revival
- NRHP reference No.: 96001070
- Added to NRHP: October 3, 1996

The Elliott R. Corbett House is a historic home built in the Colonial Revival style in 1915, and located in the Dunthorpe neighborhood south of Portland, Oregon, United States. This house, along with its nearly-identical sister project (built a year later for Elliott Corbett's brother Henry), are the finest examples of the residential work of Whitehouse and Fouilhoux, one of Portland's leading architecture firms in the second decade of the 20th century. It also represents the early stages of the development of Dunthorpe as a country-style suburb for Portland's elite. Elliott R. Corbett was a scion of the prominent Corbett family, which made its fortune in banking and inland shipping.

The house is listed on the National Register of Historic Places.

== See also ==
- National Register of Historic Places listings in Multnomah County, Oregon
