= Beatty-Corbett House =

Historic house in North Carolina, United States

- U.S. National Register of Historic Places
- Location within North Carolina Location within the United States
- Location: SR 701 at SR 1200, near Ivanhoe, North Carolina
- Coordinates: 34°33′11″N 78°15′09″W
- Area: 115.3 acres (46.7 ha)
- Built: c. 1850, c. 1900, c. 1920
- Architectural style: Classical Revival, Greek Revival
- MPS: Sampson County MRA
- NRHP reference No.: 86000549
- Added to NRHP: March 17, 1986

Beatty-Corbett House is a historic plantation house located near Ivanhoe, in Sampson County, Pender County, and Bladen County. The plantation is located at the tripoint of Sampson, Pender, and Bladen counties, with the house itself being located in Pender County. A two-story, side-hall Greek Revival style block was built about 1850, with a two-story, five-bay, double pile Classical Revival house added about 1900, and a two-room ell added about 1920. The central bay of the c. 1900 section features a two-story portico. Also on the property are the contributing round-notched log stable, smokehouse, tool shed, washhouse, a sulfur spring, tobacco barn, several sections of ornate cast iron fence, the site of a former turpentine still, the site of a former riverboat landing (Beatty's Landing), and the site of a former cotton gin.

It was listed on the National Register of Historic Places in 1986.
