= Morris H. Whitehouse =

American architect

- Born: March 21, 1878; Portland, Oregon
- Died: April 4, 1944 (aged 66); Portland, Oregon
- Occupation: Architect
- Buildings: Gus J. Solomon United States Courthouse; Temple Beth Israel

Morris Homans Whitehouse (March 21, 1878 – April 4, 1944) was an American architect whose work included the design of the Gus Solomon United States Courthouse in Portland, Oregon.

== Biography ==
Whitehouse was born in Portland, Oregon, on March 21, 1878, to Benjamin Gardner Whitehouse and Clara née Homans. In his youth he attended, and graduated from, public schools in Portland. He graduated from the Massachusetts Institute of Technology (MIT) in 1906. He was awarded the Guy Lowell Traveling Fellowship in 1905 which facilitated his pursuing studies at the American Academy in Rome, Italy from 1906 to 1907. He was the first ever recipient of that award from MIT. In 1936, he married Mildred Fuller Anderson.

== Career ==
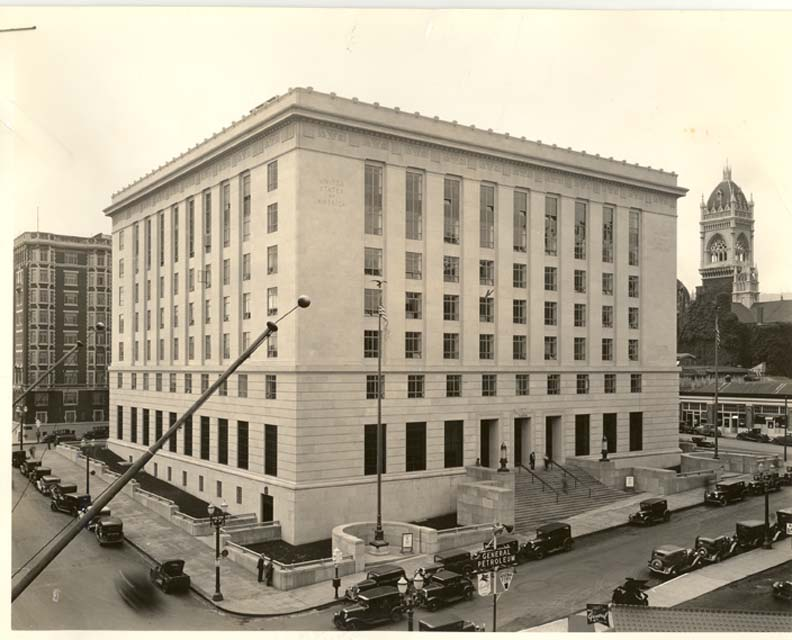
The Gus J. Solomon United States Courthouse in 1933

Whitehouse started his own practice in 1907. He then partnered with Bruce R. Honeyman in 1908. Beginning in 1909 he partnered with J. André Fouilhoux and Edgar M. Lazarus in the architectural firm "Lazarus, Whitehouse & Fouilhoux". Lazarus later left the firm, which continued under the name Whitehouse & Fouilhoux, which lasted until 1917. It was the longest-running architectural firm in Oregon. Among other buildings, the firm designed the University Club (1913) now listed on the National Register of Historic Places (NRHP), the Jefferson High School, the Lincoln High School and the Conro Fiero House, formerly listed on the NRHP but delisted after its destruction by fire. They also collaborated with New York-based firms J. H. Freelander and A. D. Seymour, in the construction of the Portland Municipal Auditorium (now the Keller Auditorium). The firm closed as a result of World War I, when Fouilhoux enlisted in 1918.

Following the war Whitehouse operated Morris H. Whitehouse, Architect, changing this name to Morris H. Whitehouse & Associates in 1926, having been joined by Glenn Stanton and Walter E. Church. They designed the Temple Beth Israel synagogue (1928), the U.S. Courthouse (1929-1931) and the Multnomah Stadium.

From 1932 to 1935, the firm was named Whitehouse, Stanton & Church. Whitehouse & Church designed the Oregon State Library in 1939. The firm was again renamed in 1942 to Whitehouse, Church, Newberry & Roehr, with the addition of Earl P. Newberry and Frank Roehr, the last name change before Whitehouse's death. Even after his death the firm remained in operation, undergoing several other name changes.

Whitehouse was a member of the Portland Architectural Club. He was also director and then president of the Oregon arm of the American Institute of Architects. He also served on the Oregon State Board of Architect Examiners from 1919 to 1930.

Whitehouse died in Portland on April 4, 1944, at St. Vincent's Hospital following a heart attack. He had remained active in his profession until entering the hospital for treatment of a heart condition, about two weeks prior to his death.

== Projects ==
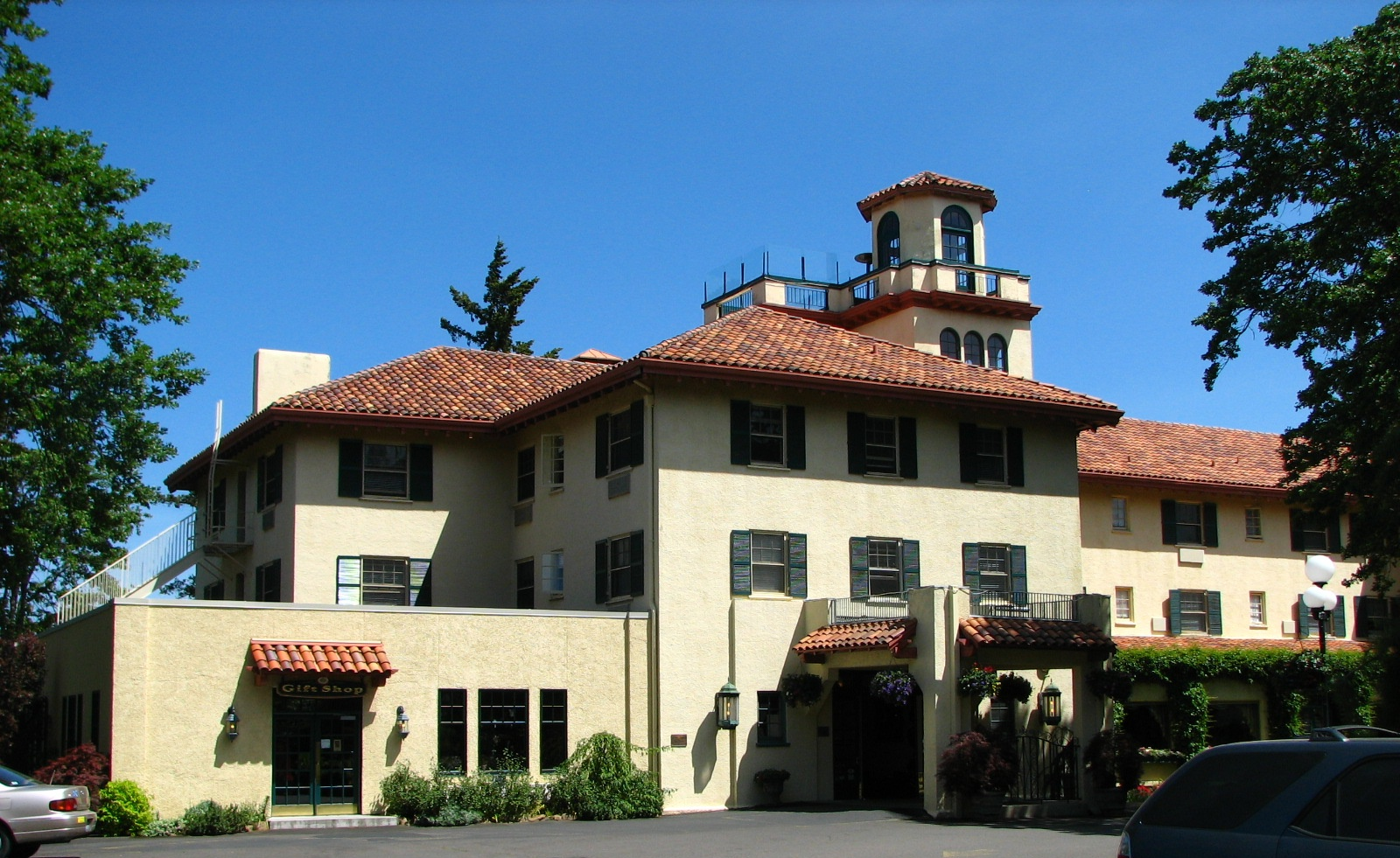
Columbia Gorge Hotel

Whitehouse and his associates designed many structures in Oregon and other parts of the Pacific Northwest. The following Oregon structures appear on the National Register of Historic Places (NRHP):

=== Portland ===
- 705 Davis Street Apartments (1913), 2141 NW Davis St (Whitehouse & Fouilhoux)
- Anna Lewis Mann Old People's Home (1910), 1021 NE 33rd Ave (Whitehouse & Fouilhoux)
- Balfour–Guthrie Building (1913), 731-733 SW Oak St
- Elliott R. Corbett House (1915), 1600 SW Greenwood Rd (Whitehouse & Fouilhoux)
- H. L. and Gretchen Hoyt Corbett House (1916), 1405 SW Corbett Hill Cir (Whitehouse & Fouilhoux)
- Aaron Frank Residence (1922), 1125 SW St. Clair Ave (contributing structure of the King's Hill Historic District)
- Alexander and Cornelia Lewthwaite House, 1715 SE Montgomery Dr
- University Club (1913), 1225 SW 6th Ave (Whitehouse & Fouilhoux)
- U.S. Courthouse (1932), 620 SW Main St
- William Blackstone Fletcher and Amy LaVenture Fletcher House (1936) 10707 S Riverside Drive (Morris H. Whitehouse & Associates)

=== Other cities ===
- Conro Fiero House, 4615 Hamrick Rd, Central Point (Whitehouse & Fouilhoux)
- Columbia Gorge Hotel, 9000 Westcliffe Dr, Hood River
- Elizabeth Clark House, 812 John Adams St, Oregon City (Morris H. Whitehouse & Associates)
- Chemeketa Lodge No. 1, Odd Fellows Buildings, 185-195 High St NE, Salem (with Walter D. Pugh)

=== Non-NRHP ===
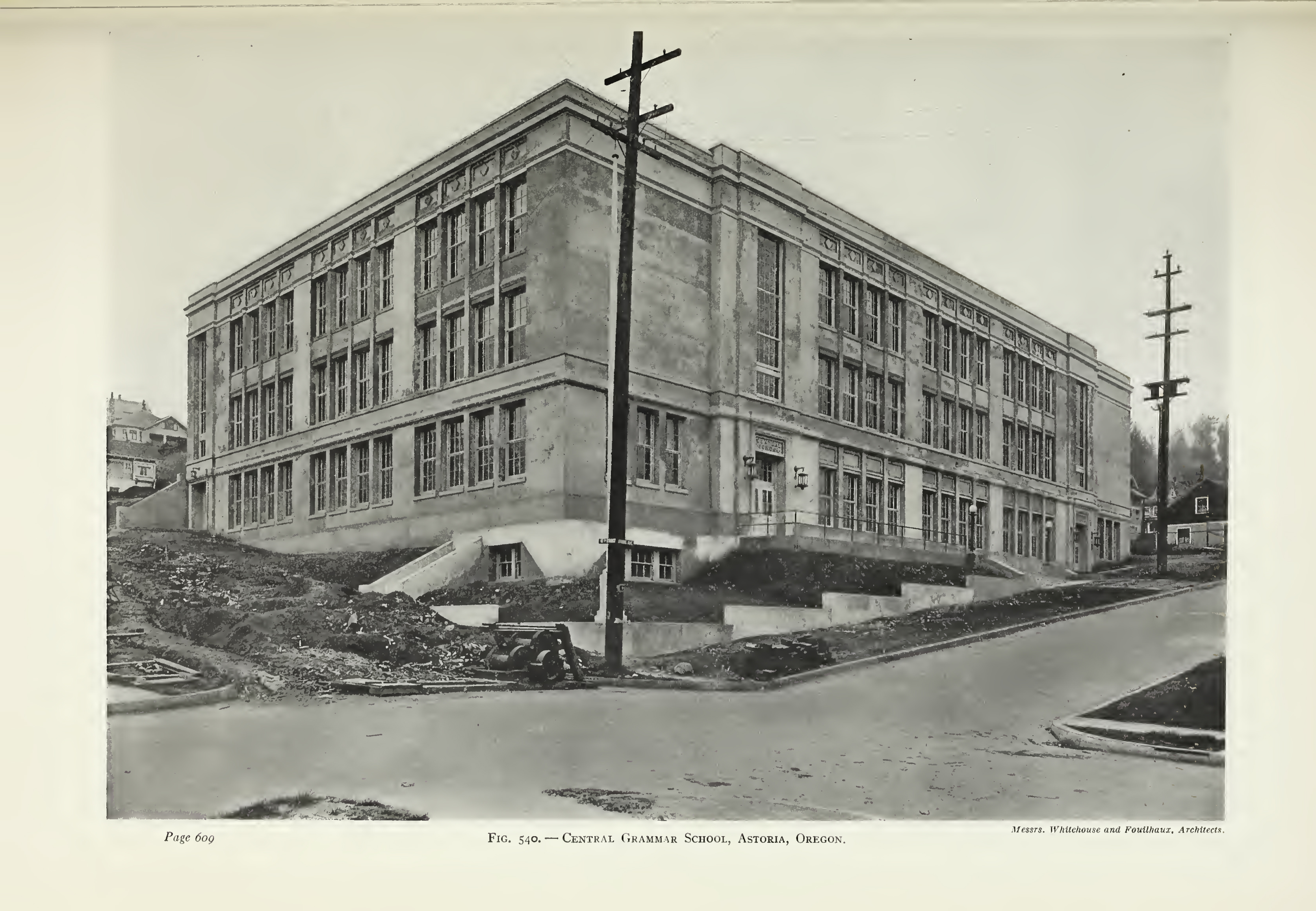
Central Grammar School; Astoria, Oregon

- Sixth Church of Christ, Scientist (1931), 1331 SW Park Ave, Portland
- Central Grammar School (AKA Lewis & Clark School), Astoria, Oregon (Demolished 1980s)

== See also ==
- Harold C. Whitehouse and Whitehouse & Price, architects of Spokane, Washington
