= H. L. and Gretchen Hoyt Corbett House =

Historic house in Oregon, United States

- U.S. National Register of Historic Places
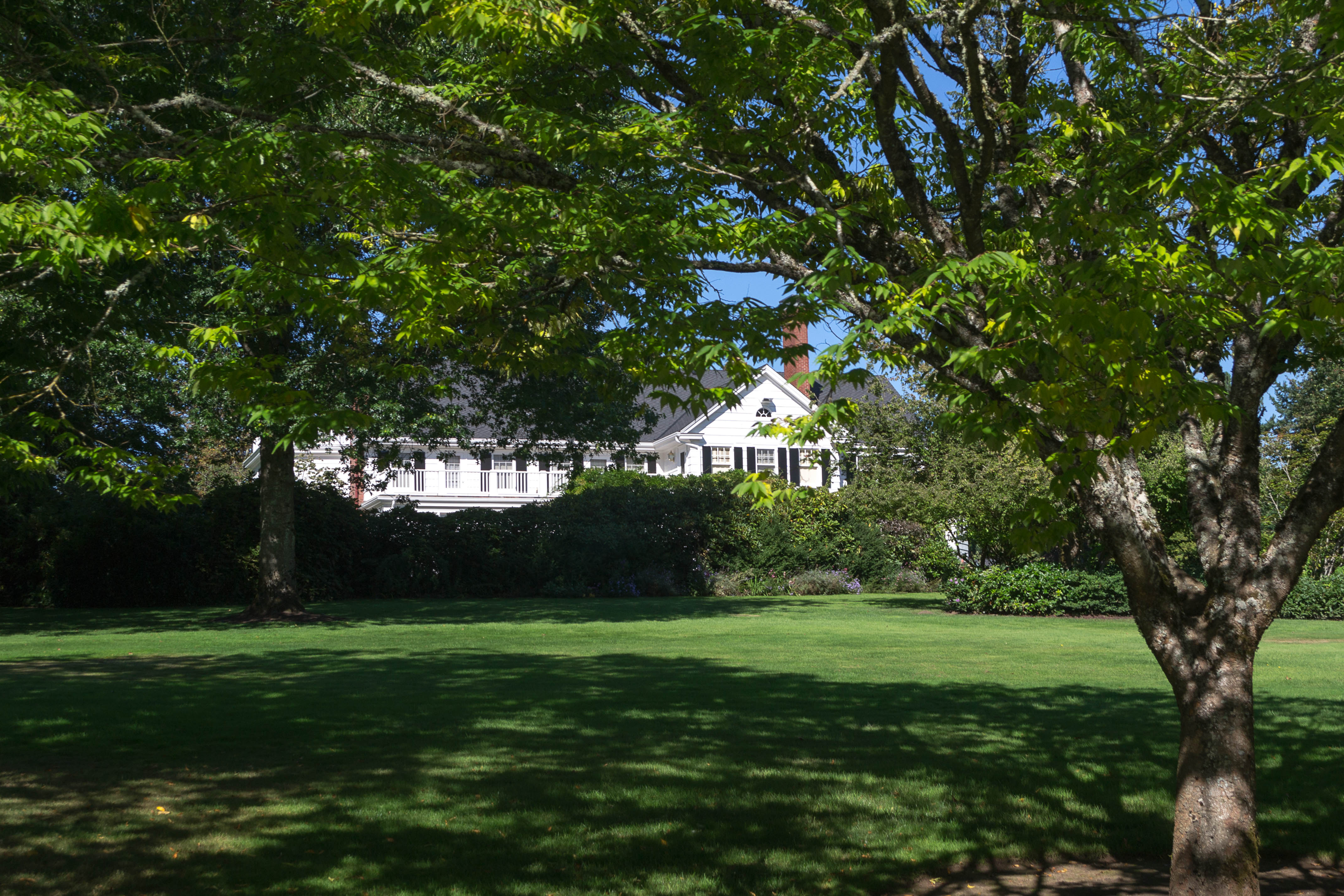
- The house in September 2013
- Location: 01405 SW Corbett Hill Circle; Portland, Oregon
- Coordinates: 45°26′19″N 122°39′50″W
- Built: 1916
- Architect: Whitehouse & Fouilhoux
- Architectural style: Colonial Revival
- NRHP reference No.: 91000129
- Added to NRHP: February 28, 1991

The Henry Ladd and Gretchen Hoyt Corbett House is a Colonial Revival-style house in Dunthorpe, Oregon, an unincorporated suburb of Portland. It is listed on the National Register of Historic Places.

The property on which the house sits was part of an 1850 640-acre land claim by William S. and Mary Jane Torrance. A 19-acre portion of the property, located in Dunthorpe which was then known as Rivera, was acquired in 1904 by Henry Ladd Corbett, a prominent politician and businessman who twice served as President of the Oregon State Senate.

The house was built in 1915 and 1916 by Corbett, who had married Gretchen Hoyt in 1908. It was a large two-story home with 7,000 square feet (650 m2) of interior space. In addition to the family living areas, there was a two-story servants' wing connected to the main house.

Henry Corbett continued to reside in the house until he died in 1957, and Gretchen until she died in 1978. The property was divided into several lots, including a 1.6-acre lot around the house, which was listed on the NRHP in 1991. Houses have since been built on most of the other lots.
