= Muñoz =

Muñoz ([muˈɲoθ] or [muˈɲos]) is a Spanish-language surname—with a Portuguese-language variant (Munhoz), from Basque "muinoa" ("hill"). The surname was expanded during the Reconquista with massive settlements done by citizens from Navarre and Álava in New Castile and Andalusia.

== Geographical distribution ==
As of 2014, 26.7% of all known bearers of the surname Muñoz were residents of Colombia (1:129), 21.1% of Spain (1:158), 20.3% of Chile (1:62), 6.7% of Argentina (1:458), 5.7% of Peru (1:397), 5.7% of Venezuela (1:379), 2.2% of Guatemala (1:533), 1.7% of Cuba (1:495), 1.6% of the Philippines (1:4,544), 1.6% of Nicaragua (1:272), 1.4% of Panama (1:206), 1.3% of Costa Rica (1:255) and 1.1% of the Dominican Republic (1:674).

In Spain, the frequency of the surname was higher than national average (1:158) in the following autonomous communities:

1. Castilla-La Mancha (1:96)
2. Andalusia (1:98)
3. Region of Murcia (1:109)
4. Extremadura (1:118)
5. Ceuta (1:125)
6. Community of Madrid (1:130)

In Chile, the frequency of the surname was higher than national average (1:62) in the following regions:

1. Maule Region (1:39)
2. Bío Bío Region (1:49)
3. Magallanes Region (1:55)
4. Aysén Region (1:60)
5. O'Higgins Region (1:60)
6. Araucanía Region (1:62)

== People ==
- Adelcira Agostini de Muñoz (1863–1969), Argentine physician
- Adriana Muñoz (born 1948), Chilean politician
- Adriana Muñoz (born 1982), Cuban middle-distance runner
- Agustín Fernando Muñoz, Duke of Riánsares (1808–1873), second husband of Maria Christina, Regent of Spain
- Agustín Muñoz Grandes (1896–1970), Spanish general, politician
- Alejandro Muñoz-Alonso (1934–2016), Spanish politician
- Alexander Muñoz (born 1979), Venezuelan professional boxer
- Alfonso Pérez Muñoz (born 1972), Spanish retired footballer
- Almudena Muñoz (born 1968), Spanish judo competitor
- Alonso Muñoz (c. 1512–1568), high-ranking administrator in Spain
- Amparo Muñoz (1954–2011), Spanish actress and Miss Universe
- Anastasia Muñoz (born 1984), American voice actress
- Andrés Fischer Muñoz (born 1965), Colombian-American painter
- Andrés Muñoz (born 1999), Mexican MLB pitcher
- Anfión Muñoz (1850–1920), Chilean political figure
- Aníbal Muñoz Duque (1908–1987), Colombian Roman Catholic Cardinal and Archbishop
- Anthony Muñoz (born 1958), NFL offensive tackle
- Antonio Jesús Vázquez Muñoz (born 1980), Spanish footballer, commonly known as Jesús Vázquez
- Antonio Muñoz (tennis) (born 1951), Spanish tennis player
- Antonio Muñoz Molina (born 1956), Spanish writer
- Arci Muñoz (born 1989), Filipina actress
- Arnie Muñoz (born 1982), Dominican MLB pitcher
- Arrate Muñoz Barrutia, Spanish bioengineer
- Arturo Muñoz (footballer) (born 1984), Mexican footballer
- Astrid Muñoz (born 1974), Puerto Rican model
- Benjamín Muñoz Gamero (1817–1851), Chilean naval officer and politician
- Bobby Muñoz (born 1968), Puerto Rican MLB baseball player
- César Muñoz (1929–2000), Ecuadorian chess master
- Carli Muñoz (born 1948), Puerto Rican jazz pianist
- Carlos Muñoz (disambiguation), several people
- Carlos Muñoz Pizarro (1913–1976), Chilean botanist
- Cathy Muñoz (born 1964), member of the Alaska House of Representatives
- Cecilia Muñoz (born 1962), American civil rights advocate
- Cecilia Muñoz-Palma (1913–2006), first woman appointed to the Supreme Court of the Philippines
- Charles Muñoz (1926–2018), American poet, novelist and publisher
- Cipriano Muñoz, 2nd Count of la Viñaza (1862–1933), Spanish diplomat and academic
- Claudio Bravo Muñoz (born 1983), Chilean football goalkeeper
- Claudio Muñoz (born 1984), Chilean football defender
- Cristián Muñoz (footballer, born 1977), Argentine football goalkeeper
- Cristián Muñoz (footballer, born 1983), Chilean football player and manager
- Cristian Muñoz (racewalker) (born 1981), Chilean race walker
- Cristian Camilo Muñoz (1996–2026), Colombian cyclist
- Dandeny Muñoz Mosquera (born 1965), Colombian hitman, purported "chief assassin" for the Medellín Cartel
- Dani Parejo Muñoz (born 1989), Spanish footballer
- David Ibarra Muñoz (born 1930), Mexican economist and politician
- David Muñoz (disambiguation), several people
- Diego Muñoz Camargo (1529–1599), Mexican author of History of Tlaxcala
- Dolores Muñoz Ledo (1918–2026), Mexican voice actress
- Edgar Muñoz (born 1983), Venezuelan boxer
- Eduardo Muñoz Bachs (1937–2001), Cuban poster artist
- Emilio Muñoz (born 1962), Spanish bullfighter and actor
- Eunice Muñoz (1928–2022), Portuguese actress
- Evaristo Muñoz (1684–1737), Spanish painter of the Baroque period
- Evita Muñoz (1936–2016), Mexican actress
- Faustino Sainz Muñoz (1937–2012), Spanish prelate of the Roman Catholic Church
- Federico Muñoz (born 1963), Colombian road cyclist
- Felipe Muñoz (born 1951), Mexican swimmer
- Fernando Muñoz (born 1967), Spanish footballer, commonly known as Nando
- Francisco José Ynduráin Muñoz (1940–2008), Spanish theoretical physicist
- George Muñoz (born 1951), President of Muñoz Investment Banking Group, LLC
- Guillermo Muñoz (disambiguation), several people
- Gustavo Madero Muñoz (born 1955), Mexican politician and businessman
- Héctor Martínez Muñoz (1924–1991), member of the Supreme Court of Puerto Rico
- Heraldo Muñoz (born 1948), Chilean politician and diplomat
- Hernán Darío Muñoz (born 1973), Colombian road racing cyclist
- Hugo Muñoz (born 1973), Peruvian high jumper
- Iñaki Muñoz (born 1978), Spanish footballer
- Isabel Muñoz (born 1951), Spanish photographer
- Iván Pérez Muñoz (born 1976), Spanish football striker
- James Muñoz, lead singer of American metalcore band The Bled
- Javier Muñoz (born 1995), Spanish footballer
- Javier Muñoz (born 1980), Argentine footballer
- Javiera Muñoz (1977–2018), Swedish singer with Chilean-Uruguayan roots
- Joaquín Rubio y Muñoz (1788–1874), Spanish lawyer, antiquarian and numismatist
- Joel Muñoz (born 1980), Panamanian basketball player
- Jorge Antonio Muñoz (born 1981), Chilean football midfielder
- José Muñoz (disambiguation), several people
- Juan Bautista Muñoz (1745–1799), Spanish philosopher and historian
- Juan Carlos Muñoz (1919–2009), Argentine footballer
- Juan Jacinto Muñoz Rengel (born 1974), Spanish writer and founder of the literary review Estigma
- Juan José Muñoz (1950–2013), Argentine businessman
- Juan Manuel Muñoz (born 1985), Spanish footballer
- Juan Muñoz (1953–2001), Spanish sculptor
- Kitín Muñoz (born 1958), Spanish navigator and scientist
- León Darío Muñoz (born 1977), Colombian footballer
- Lesly Muñoz, American politician and labor organizer
- Lucio Muñoz (1929–1998), Spanish painter
- Luis Muñoz Marín (1898–1980), Puerto Rico's first democratically elected governor
- Luis Muñoz Rivera (1859–1916), Puerto Rican poet, journalist and politician
- Luis Muñoz Rivera (senator) (1916–2006)
- Manolo Muñoz (1941–2000), Mexican singer and actor
- Manuel Muñoz (disambiguation), several people
- Mariana de Pineda Muñoz (1804–1831), Spanish national heroine
- Mariela Muñoz (1943–2017), Argentine transsexual activist
- Mark Muñoz (born 1978), Filipino-American mixed martial artist
- Matilde Muñoz Sampedro (1900–1969), Spanish actress
- Maritza Martin Munoz (1959–1993), American woman murdered during a news interview
- Mercedes Negrón Muñoz (1895–1973), Puerto Rican poet
- Miguel Ángel Muñoz (born 1983), Spanish actor and singer
- Miguel Muñoz (1922–1990), Spanish footballer and manager
- Moisés Muñoz (born 1980), Mexican football goalkeeper
- Morella Muñoz (1935–1995), Venezuelan singer
- Muñoz sisters: Lola, Lucía, Pilar and Rocío, members of the Spanish girl group Las Ketchup
- Myrna Muñoz, American politician and educator
- Nicolás Muñoz (born 1981), Panamanian footballer
- Nicole Muñoz (born 1994), Canadian film and television actress
- Noe Muñoz (born 1967), MLB baseball catcher
- Pablo Muñoz Vega S.J. (1903–1994), Ecuadorian Roman Catholic Cardinal and Archbishop
- Paloma Muñoz (born 1965), visual artist, member of the group Martin & Muñoz
- Pam Muñoz Ryan (born 1951), American Latina author
- Pedro López Muñoz (born 1983), Spanish footballer
- Pedro Muñoz (born 1968), MLB baseball outfielder
- Pedro Muñoz Machín Rodríguez (born 1958), Spanish road bicycle racer
- Pedro Muñoz Seca (1881–1936), Spanish dramatist
- Pilar Muñoz (1911–1980), Spanish actress
- Porfirio Muñoz Ledo (1933–2023), Mexican politician
- Rafael Muñoz (disambiguation), several people
- Ramón Muñoz Gutiérrez (born 1960), Mexican right-wing politician
- Raúl Muñoz (born 1975), Chilean footballer
- René Muñoz (1938–2000), Cuban actor and scriptwriter
- Ricardo Muñoz, Chicago alderman
- Ricardo Muñoz Suay (1917–1997), Spanish film director, producer and screenwriter
- Roddery Muñoz (born 2000), Dominican baseball player
- Rodrigo Muñoz (born 1982), Uruguayan footballer
- Roger Muñoz (born 1984), Nicaraguan basketball player
- Rolddy Muñoz (born 2000), Dominican baseball player
- Rudy Muñoz (born 2005), Guatemalan footballer
- Rush (wrestler) (born 1988), full name William Arturo Muñoz González, Mexican wrestler
- Santiago Muñoz (born 2002), Mexican footballer
- Sergio Garrote Muñoz (born 1979), Spanish Para-cyclist
- Silvia Muñoz (born 1979), Spanish field hockey player
- Susana Blaustein Muñoz, Argentine film director
- Tito Muñoz (born 1983), American conductor
- Toni Muñoz (born 1982), Spanish football striker
- Víctor Muñoz (disambiguation), several people
- Victoria Muñoz Mendoza (born 1940), Puerto Rican politician
- Vincent Phillip Muñoz, American political scientist
- Xisco Muñoz (born 1980), Spanish former footballer and manager
- Yairo Muñoz (born 1995), Dominican baseball player
- Zahid Muñoz (born 2001), Mexican footballer
- Zulina Muñoz (born 1987), Mexican boxer

== Places ==
- Gutierre-Muñoz, municipality in Spain
- Hoyos de Miguel Muñoz, municipality in Spain
- Luis Muñoz Marín International Airport, public airport in Puerto Rico
- Luis Muñoz Rivera Park, national park in Puerto Rico
- Luis Muñoz Rivera (Ponce statue), in Puerto Rico
- Martín Muñoz de la Dehesa, municipality in Spain
- Martín Muñoz de las Posadas, municipality in Spain
- Miguel Muñoz Trophy, Spanish football award
- Muñoz Airstrip, dirt airstrip in Baja California, Mexico
- Muñoz Gamero Peninsula, peninsula in Chile
- Muñoz Municipality, municipality in Venezuela
- Muñoz, Nueva Ecija, officially the Science City of Muñoz, Philippines
- Patio Muñoz, neighborhood in the city of Xalapa, Mexico
- Pedro Muñoz, municipality in Spain
- San Muñoz, municipality in Spain
- Veterans Village (Muñoz, locally), a district of Quezon City, Philippines
