= Arrate =

Arrate is a name of Basque origin. Notable people with the name include:

== Given name ==
- Arrate Guisasola (born 1979), Spanish footballer
- Arrate Muñoz Barrutia (born 1973), Spanish biomedical engineer
- Arrate Orueta (born 1984), Spanish footballer

== Surname ==
- Herminia Arrate (1895–1941), Chilean painter and First Lady of Chile
- Jorge Arrate (born 1941), Chilean lawyer, economist, writer and politician
- Mariano Arrate (1892–1963), Spanish footballer
- Marina Arrate (born 1957), Chilean poet and psychologist
