= Samuel Browne =

Samuel Browne may refer to:

- Samuel Browne (cricketer) (1844–?), Barbadian cricketer
- Samuel Browne (divine) (c. 1575–1632), English minister of religion
- Samuel Browne (judge) (1598–1668), English lawyer, MP for Totnes and Bedford, knight
- Samuel Browne (MP for Rutland) (c. 1634–1691), his nephew, English militia commissioner and MP for Rutland
- Samuel Browne (surgeon) (died 1698), English botanist

== See also ==
- Sam Browne (disambiguation)
- Samuel Brown (disambiguation)
- Sam Brown (disambiguation)
