= Samuel Brown =

Samuel Brown may refer to:

== Law and politics ==
- Samuel A. Brown (1795–1863), American politician in New York
- Samuel Brown (Wisconsin politician) (1804–1874), American politician
- Samuel Brown (Oregon politician) (1821–1886), American politician
- Sam Brown (mayor) (Samuel Brown, 1845–1909), New Zealand politician
- Samuel Lombard Brown (1858–1939), Irish politician and barrister
- Samuel McConnell Brown (1865–1923), Australian politician
- Samuel Brown (Alberta politician) (1872–1962), Canadian politician

== Sports ==
- Samuel S. Brown (1842–1905), American racehorse owner/breeder
- Samuel Brown (cricketer) (1857–1938), English cricketer
- Samuel Brown (American football) (born 2002), American football player

== Others ==
- Samuel Brown (Royal Navy officer) (1776–1852), English engineer and inventor
- Samuel Brown (engineer) (1799–1849), English inventor
- Samuel Robbins Brown (1810–1880), American missionary to China
- Samuel Gilman Brown (1813–1885), American educator
- Samuel Morison Brown (1817–1856), Scottish chemist
- Samuel Joseph Brown Jr. (1907–1994), African American watercolorist
- Samuel J. Brown (1917–1990), United States Air Forces fighter pilot
- Samuel Ashley Brown (1923–2011), American English professor

== Other uses ==
- SS Samuel Q. Brown, American steam tanker

== See also ==
- Samuel Browne (disambiguation)
- Sam Brown (disambiguation)
- Sam Browne (disambiguation)
