= Dimitri Van De Ville =

Swiss-Belgian scientist (born 1975)

Professor Dimitri Van De Ville
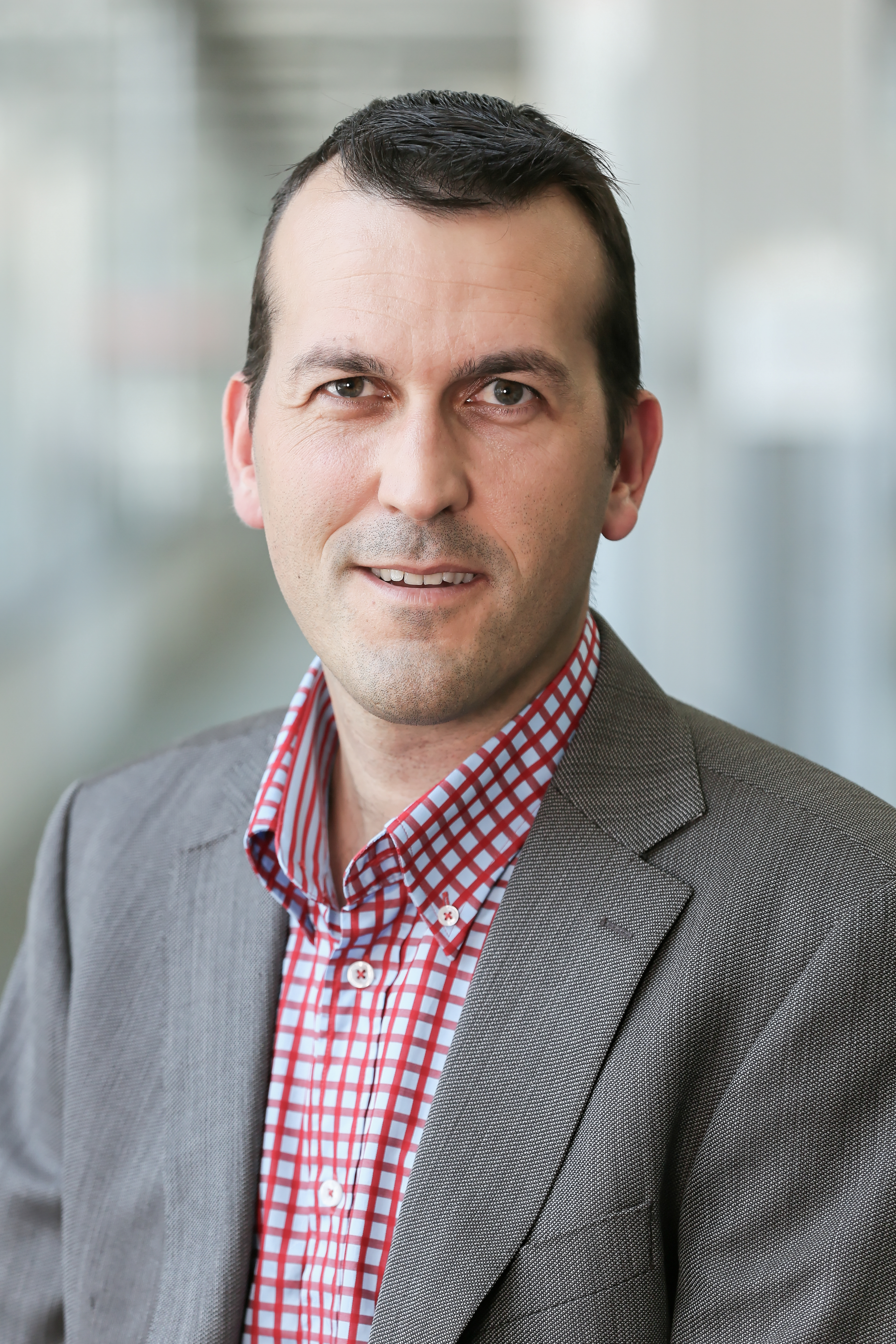
- Dimitri Van De Ville in 2015
- Born: 1975 (age 50–51); Dendermonde
- Citizenship: Swiss; Belgian
- Known for: Dynamical and network aspects of brain activity
- Awards: 2016 Leenaards Prize; 2014 NARSAD Independent Investigator Award; 2013 NeuroImage Editors' Choice Award; 2012 Pfizer Prize

Academic background
- Education: Computer science, Ghent University
- Thesis: Lineaire, niet-lineaire en vaaglogische beeldinterpolatietechnieken (Linear, nonlinear, and fuzzy image interpolation techniques) (2002)
- Doctoral advisor: Ignace Lemahieu; Wilfried Philips
- Other advisor: Michael Unser

Academic work
- Discipline: Computer science Neuroscience
- Sub-discipline: Wavelet; Neuroimaging
- Institutions: EPFL (École Polytechnique Fédérale de Lausanne); University of Geneva
- Main interests: Signal processing Computational neuroimaging
- Website: https://miplab.epfl.ch/

Dimitri Van De Ville (born 1975 in Dendermonde) is a Swiss and Belgian computer scientist and neuroscientist specialized in dynamical and network aspects of brain activity. He is a professor of bioengineering at EPFL (École Polytechnique Fédérale de Lausanne) and the head of the Medical Image Processing Laboratory at EPFL's School of Engineering.

== Career ==
Van De Ville studied computer sciences at Ghent University and received his Master's degree suma cum lauda in 1998. He then pursued a PhD at the same institution and graduated in 2002 with a thesis on "Linear, nonlinear, and fuzzy image interpolation techniques" (Lineaire, niet-lineaire en vaaglogische beeldinterpolatietechnieken) that was supervised by Ignace Lemahieu and Wilfried Philips. He joined the EPFL as a post-doctoral researcher in Michael Unser's Biomedical Imaging Group. In 2005, he became group leader of the Signal Processing Core Geneva at the CIBM Center for Biomedical Imaging.

In 2009, enabled by a SNSF Professorship Grant, he founded the Medical Image Processing Laboratory that is jointly held by EPFL's Institute of Bioengineering and the University of Geneva's Faculty of Medicine, and that is currently situated at the Campus Biotech in Geneva. In 2015, he was appointed tenured associate professor at EPFL with an adjunct appointment at the University of Geneva. Since 2015 he has been the head of the CIBM's Signal Processing Section, and since 2020 he has been the ad-interim head of CIBM's Animal Imaging & Technology Section.

== Research ==
Van De Ville's research focuses on functional neuroimaging techniques such as functional magnetic resonance imaging (fMRI) and electroencephalography (EEG) to measure dynamical and network aspects of human brain activity. He develops analysis methods at the interface of signal processing, data and network science, statistics, and applies them to investigate brain function.

Van De Ville's research interests through to the end of his post-doctoral studies were dedicated to wavelets and splines, specifically to hex-splines, isotropic polyharmonic B-spline wavelets, and operator wavelets. This research also found application in neuro-imaging by inspiring adaptation such as activelets and wavelet-based statistical parametric mapping.

Since 2009 Van De Ville has dedicated his research to computational neuroimaging with the aim to study brain functions related to behavior in health and disorder by employing fMRI and EEG data. He provides an explanation why fast EEG neural correlates (milliseconds timescale) can be correlated with slow fMRI hemodynamic fluctuations (seconds timescale) by demonstrating that sequences of EEG micro-state topographies represent scale-free organization. He also introduced machine learning methods to functional connectivity measures, and thereby initiated the field of connectivity decoding.

In describing both the method and the application for imaging-based biomarkers, he was among the first to describe the dynamic functional connectome. He also helped to introduce brain states based on sliding-window functional connectivity. To allow for reliable identification of spatial patterns of transient brain activity, he introduced a novel method for sparsity-pursuing regularized hemodynamic deconvolution of fMRI time series. This method also enabled an important progress to the classical Wiener deconvolution, and brought insights in brain activity dynamics during sleep and alterations owing to neurological conditions.

Van De Ville research is also dedicated to the emerging field of graph signal processing to resolve brain structure-function relationships, where the structural connectome is employed as a graph, on which a function is expressed. This framework allows to quantify the amount of activity 'coupling' with the underlying structure, and thereby helps to elucidate hierarchical organization of the brain that is relevant for behavior. Recently his research helped to extend the regular atlas-based graphs including a few hundred nodes to fine-grained voxel-wise graphs representing around a million nodes. His underlying theoretical work on graph signal processing encompasses the proposal of multi-slice graph wavelets, graph Slepians, and community-based graph filtering.

He is also actively developing real-time neuro-feedback applications of fMRI that allow for the self-regulation of brain activity by the volunteer in the scanner by the principle of biofeedback.

== Distinctions ==
Van De Ville is the recipient of the 2016 Leenaards Prize, the 2014 NARSAD Independent Investigator Award, the 2013 NeuroImage Editors' Choice Award, and the 2012 Pfizer Prize.

He is a distinguished lecturer of the 2021–2022 IEEE Signal Processing Society (SPS), and a Fellow of the IEEE (2020).

He is the president of the board of the Swiss Society for Biomedical Engineering (SSBE; since 2020). He was founding chair of the Special Attention Team for Biomedical Image & Signal Analytics of the European Association for Signal Processing (EURASIP; 2016–2019), and vice-chair (2011), chair (2012–2013), and past chair (2014) of the Biomedical Imaging & Signal Processing (BISP) Technical Committee of the IEEE Signal Processing Society (SPS).

He has been a senior associate editor of the IEEE Transactions on Signal Processing (since 2019), an associate editor of the SIAM Journal of Imaging Sciences (since 2018), a founding associate editor of Elsevier NeuroImage Reports (since 2020), an associate editor of the IEEE Transactions on Image Processing (2006–2009), and an associate editor of the IEEE Signal Processing Letters (2004–2006).

== Selected works ==
- Preti, Maria Giulia; Bolton, Thomas AW; Van De Ville, Dimitri (October 2017). "The dynamic functional connectome: State-of-the-art and perspectives". NeuroImage. 160: 41–54. doi:10.1016/j.neuroimage.2016.12.061. ISSN 1053-8119. PMID 28034766. S2CID 6198510.
- Britz, Juliane; Van De Ville, Dimitri; Michel, Christoph M. (2010). "BOLD correlates of EEG topography reveal rapid resting-state network dynamics". NeuroImage. 52 (4): 1162–1170. doi:10.1016/j.neuroimage.2010.02.052. PMID 20188188. S2CID 125718.
- Leonardi, Nora; Van De Ville, Dimitri (2015). "On spurious and real fluctuations of dynamic functional connectivity during rest". NeuroImage. 104: 430–436. doi:10.1016/j.neuroimage.2014.09.007. PMID 25234118. S2CID 472092.
- Van De Ville, D.; Britz, J.; Michel, C. M. (2010). "EEG microstate sequences in healthy humans at rest reveal scale-free dynamics". Proceedings of the National Academy of Sciences. 107 (42): 18179–18184. Bibcode:2010PNAS..10718179V. doi:10.1073/pnas.1007841107. PMC 2964192. PMID 20921381.
- Van De Ville, D.; Nachtegael, M.; Van Der Weken, D.; Kerre, E.E.; Philips, W.; Lemahieu, I. (2003). "Noise reduction by fuzzy image filtering". IEEE Transactions on Fuzzy Systems. 11 (4): 429–436. Bibcode:2003ITFS...11..429V. doi:10.1109/TFUZZ.2003.814830.
- Leonardi, Nora; Richiardi, Jonas; Gschwind, Markus; Simioni, Samanta; Annoni, Jean-Marie; Schluep, Myriam; Vuilleumier, Patrik; Van De Ville, Dimitri (2013). "Principal components of functional connectivity: A new approach to study dynamic brain connectivity during rest". NeuroImage. 83: 937–950. doi:10.1016/j.neuroimage.2013.07.019. PMID 23872496. S2CID 14198209.
- Karahanoğlu, Fikret Işik; Van De Ville, Dimitri (2015). "Transient brain activity disentangles fMRI resting-state dynamics in terms of spatially and temporally overlapping networks". Nature Communications. 6 7751. Bibcode:2015NatCo...6.7751K. doi:10.1038/ncomms8751. PMC 4518303. PMID 26178017. S2CID 605370.
- Huang, Weiyu; Bolton, Thomas A. W.; Medaglia, John D.; Bassett, Danielle S.; Ribeiro, Alejandro; Van De Ville, Dimitri (2018). "A Graph Signal Processing Perspective on Functional Brain Imaging". Proceedings of the IEEE. 106 (5): 868–885. doi:10.1109/JPROC.2018.2798928. S2CID 13810090.
- Leonardi, Nora; Van De Ville, Dimitri (2013). "Tight Wavelet Frames on Multislice Graphs". IEEE Transactions on Signal Processing. 61 (13): 3357–3367. Bibcode:2013ITSP...61.3357L. doi:10.1109/TSP.2013.2259825. S2CID 9226088.
