= Carlos Muñoz =

Carlos Muñoz may refer to:

- Carlos Muñoz (footballer, born 1961), Spanish football (soccer) player
- Carlos Muñoz Pizarro (1913–1976), Chilean botanist
- Carlos Muñoz (actor) (1919–2005), Spanish actor
- Carlos Muñoz (businessman) (born 1969), Spanish businessman
- Carlos Muñoz (Chilean footballer) (born 1989), Chilean football (soccer) player
- Carlos Muñoz (Ecuadorian footballer) (1967–1993), Ecuadorian football (soccer) player
- Carlos Muñoz (Mexican footballer) (born 1959), Mexican football (soccer) player
- Carlos Muñoz (racing driver) (born 1992), Colombian racing driver
- Carlos Muñoz (baseball) (born 1979), Panamanian baseball player
- Carlos Muñoz (badminton), Colombian badminton player
- Carlos Muñoz (professional wrestler) (born 1991), Mexican professional wrestler
- Carlos Muñoz (wrestler) (born 1992), Colombian wrestler
- Carlos Isaac Muñoz (born 1998), Spanish footballer
