= Barrutia =

Barrutia is a surname. Notable people with the surname include:

- Antonio Barrutia (1933–2021), Spanish cyclist
- Arrate Muñoz Barrutia, Spanish bioengineer
- Cosme Barrutia (1929–2005), Spanish cyclist
