= Sam Brown =

Sam Brown may refer to:

== Arts and entertainment ==
- Sam Brown (Rastafari) (1925–1998), Jamaican Rastafarian elder and roots reggae singer and poet
- Sam Brown (guitarist) (1939–1977), American jazz guitarist with Thad Jones/Mel Lewis Big Band
- Sam Brown (singer) (born 1964), English singer-songwriter, daughter of singer Joe Brown
- Sam Brown III (born 1947), AKA Samm Brown, American songwriter, record producer, arranger and composer worked a lot with African American artists
- Sam Brown (comedian) (born 1981), American comedian, founding member of sketch troupe Whitest Kids U Know
- Sam Brown (artist), American artist and author, noted for his exploding dog web site
- Sam Brown, British music video director associated with Rogue Films

== Sports ==
- Sam Brown (baseball) (1878–1931), Major League Baseball player
- Sam Brown (soccer) (born 1996), American soccer player
- Sammy Brown (born 1990), American professional football linebacker
- Sammy Brown (linebacker, born 2005), American college football linebacker

== Other people ==
- Sam Brown (frontiersman) (1845–1925), American frontiersman, educator, civic leader, advocate for Native Americans, and historian
- Sam Brown (outlaw) (1831–1861), American gunfighter in the Wild West
- Sam H. Brown, American farmer and politician from Oregon in the early 20th century
- Sam Brown (activist) (born 1943), organized the Moratorium to End the War in Vietnam
- Sam Brown (military officer), American politician and Under Secretary of Veterans Affairs for Memorial Affairs

== See also ==
- Sam Browne (disambiguation)
- Samuel Brown (disambiguation)
- Sam Brown House, an 1857 historic house built by Samuel Brown (1821–1886)
- Samantha Brown (born 1970), American television host
