= Volotea =

Spanish low-cost airline

- Volotea Airbus A319
IATA	ICAO	Call sign
V7	VOE	VOLOTEA
- Founded: 2011; 15 years ago
- Commenced operations: 5 April 2012; 14 years ago
- Operating bases: List of bases: Asturias; Bari; Bilbao; Bordeaux; Florence; Lille; Lourdes; Lyon; Marseille; Montpellier; Nantes; Naples; Olbia; Palermo; Strasbourg; Toulouse; Venice; Verona
- Frequent-flyer program: Megavolotea
- Fleet size: 45
- Destinations: 79
- Headquarters: Asturias Airport, Castrillón, Spain (registered office)
- Key people: Carlos Muñoz (CEO); Lázaro Ros (CEO)
- Revenue: € 818 million (2025)
- Employees: 2,000
- Website: www.volotea.com

Volotea (Spanish: [boloˈtea]) is a Spanish low-cost airline registered in Castrillón and headquartered in Barcelona.

== History ==
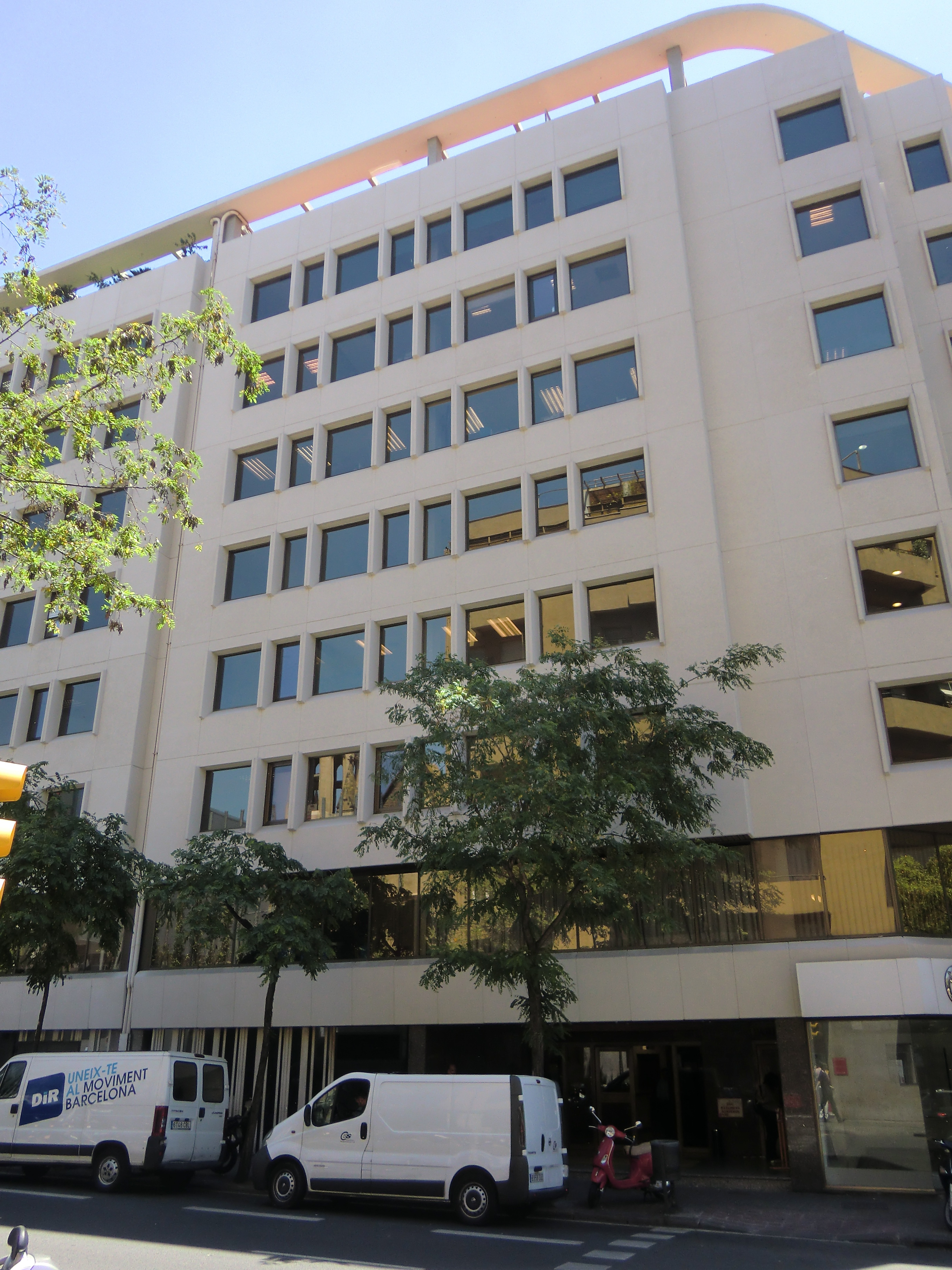
Volotea's head office in Barcelona

=== Foundation and early years ===
Volotea was established by Alaeo S.L. from Barcelona, a company created by former Vueling founders, Carlos Muñoz and Lázaro Ros. The name "Volotea" originates from the Spanish verb "revolotear", meaning "to fly around". It commenced operations on 5 April 2012, from Venice Marco Polo Airport.

The company is backed by three private-equity funds, two of them from Europe (Axis Participaciones Empresariales and Corpfin Capital) and a third from the United States (CCMP Capital), whose chairman, Greg Brenneman, was one-time President and COO of the US airline Continental Airlines, and also chairs Volotea's board. The company raised over €50m before operations began. US CCMP Capital Partners holds 49% of voting rights; Axis and Corpfin Capital 25%; and Muñoz and Ros 26% along with relatives: this ownership has existed since foundation, but it could change before an initial public offering prior to 2021–2022.

After studying the Bombardier CRJ1000 and the Embraer E-195 in 2011, Volotea selected the Boeing 717 after Southwest Airlines acquired AirTran and replaced its 717 fleet. Boeing announced on 15 February 2012 that it had signed a long-term lease deal with Volotea for an undisclosed number of Boeing 717 aircraft. In March 2015, it was announced that Volotea would receive a further four 717s from Blue1. However, in November 2015, Volotea announced plans to phase out its 717 fleet over the next few years and replace it with Airbus A320 family aircraft.

Volotea opened 90 routes in its first year, of which 40 were closed within two years; it operated almost 300 routes in summer 2018 including 220 openings, and this could double to at least 500-600 across Europe. Volotea has been non profitable since 2014, a turnover of €360 million ($431 million) is expected in 2018 after $347M in 2017, carrying 5.7 to 6 million passengers, 50% being leisure travellers, 35% visiting friends and relatives, and 15% business travellers.

Due to the 2017–18 Spanish constitutional crisis, in 2017, Volotea changed the headquarters to Asturias.

=== Development since 2020 ===
In January 2021, Volotea retired the last of its 19 Boeing 717-200s. It was the last European airline to operate the type. In October 2021, Volotea won the auction for handling the PSOs, for a period of 7 months, to and from the island of Sardinia, organised by the Autonomous Region of Sardinia on behalf of the Italian Government. The airline operated the PSO services by offering daily flights, as per what required by the auction, from the Sardinian airports of Cagliari-Elmas, Olbia-Costa Smeralda and Alghero-Fertilia to the Italian airports of Rome Fiumicino and Milan Linate. The PSO operations started on 15 October 2021 and were to end on 15 May 2022.

In January 2022, Volotea announced the closure of its base at Genoa Airport after five years, ending 14 routes. In March 2022, the company announced its intentions to take part in the upcoming PSO auction in Sardinia, which had been previously announced by the Autonomous Region of Sardinia, solely with the route from Cagliari-Elmas to Rome Fiumicino airport, being it the most profitable service within the PSO scheme, while data regarding the other routes was being analysed as they were also being taken into consideration. Subsequently, at the end of the month, ITA Airways announced its willingness to operate PSO service routes from all Sardinian airports without any financial compensations for an year until May 2023. As a result, Volotea announced on 28 March 2022 that it was also interested in covering all PSO routes, without financial compensations, from both Cagliari-Elmas and Olbia-Costa Smeralda airports, after having analysed data from their previous PSO experience. In April 2022, Carlos Muñoz, the CEO of the company, eventually announced Volotea had reached an agreement with ITA Airways; according to which the airline will operate only half of the frequencies, while the remaining ones would be assigned to the counterpart.

In May 2023, Volotea and Eurowings signed a cooperation agreement with reciprocal sales of 150 routes. In 2026, Volotea announced it intended to cut services and reduce its fleet from 44 to 30 to 35 aircraft.

== Corporate affairs ==
The key trends for Volotea are:

	Revenue (€m)	Number of employees	Number of passengers (m)	Passenger load factor (%)	Number of routes	Fleet size	References
2018	396		6.5	93			
2019	441	1,300	7.6	94	319	36	
2020	192	1,120	3.8	90.7	285	36	
2021	302	1,281	6.0		354	41	
2022	557	1,326	9.4	91	360	41	
2023	694	1,579	10.4	91	410	41	
2024	811	1,886	11.4	91	440	44	
2025	818	2,250	11.3	90	430	45	

== Destinations ==
The focus of Volotea's route network is on destinations around the European side of the Mediterranean coast as well as Western and Southern Europe. As of May 2018, Volotea serves metropolitan and leisure destinations mainly in Spain, France, Italy and Greece with destinations in Austria, Croatia, Czechia, Germany, Luxembourg, Norway and Portugal. Volotea served its first African destination (Tangier, Morocco) on 5 April 2019.

=== Codeshare and interline agreements ===
Volotea has codeshare and interline agreements with the following airlines:

=== Codeshare ===
- Aegean Airlines
- Eurowings
- ITA Airways

=== Interline ===
- Air Transat
- French Bee

== Fleet ==
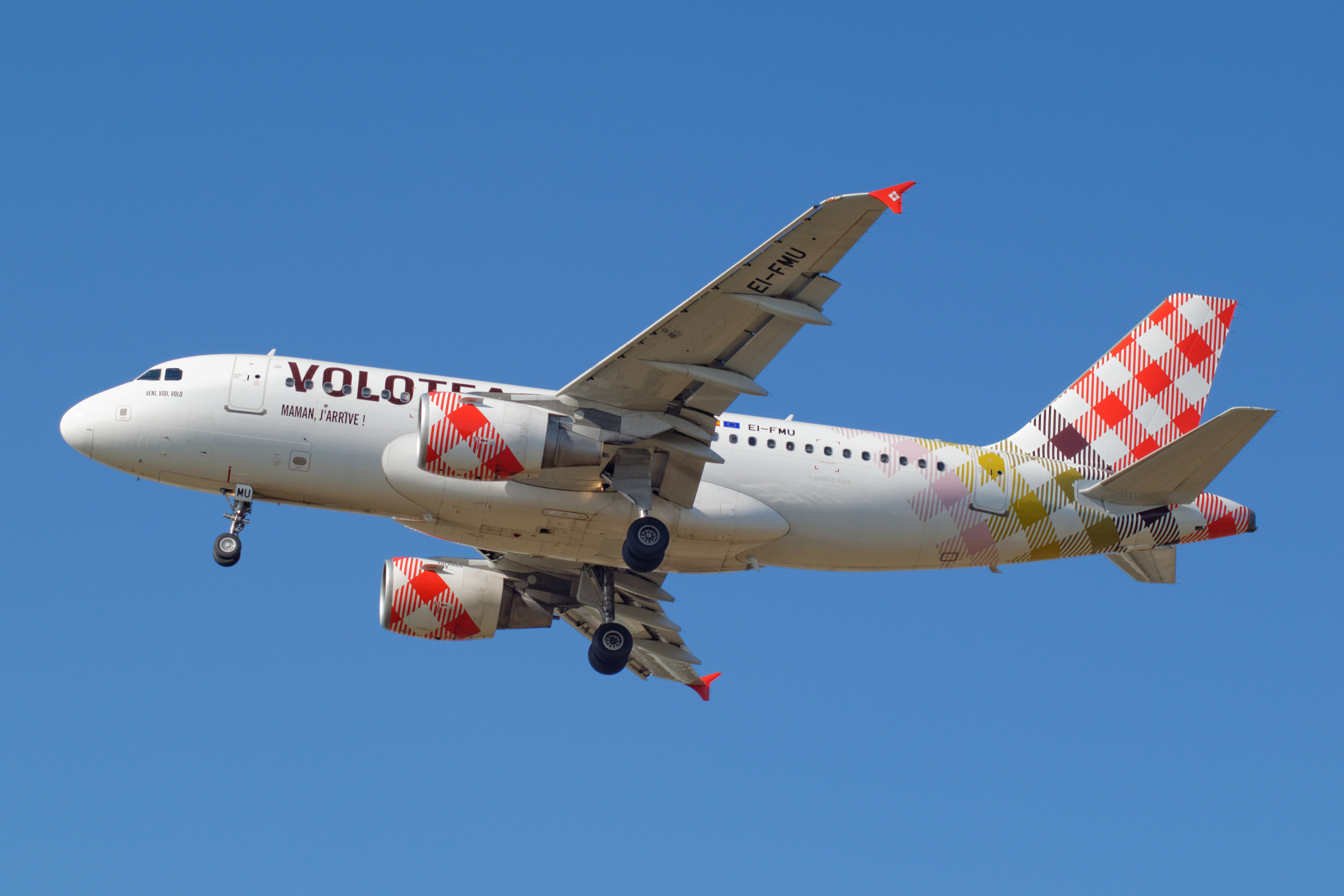
Volotea Airbus A319-100

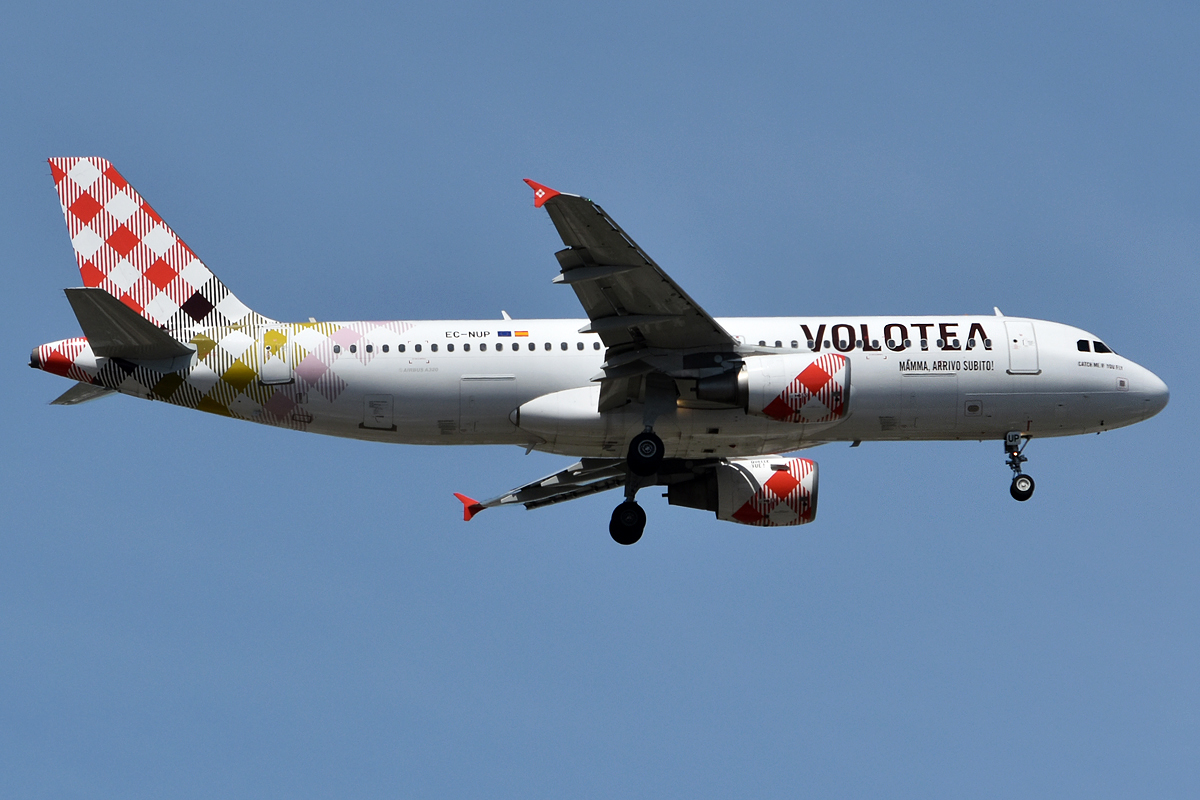
Volotea Airbus A320-200

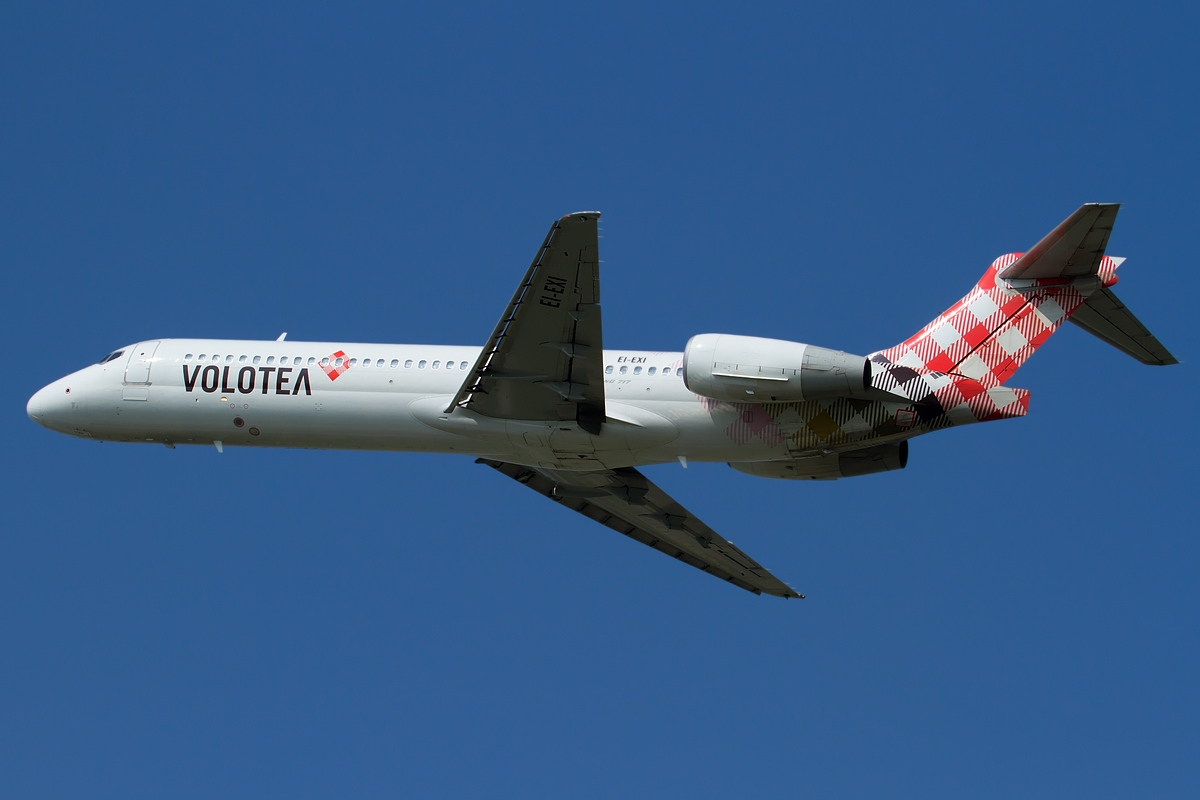
Volotea Boeing 717-200 before retirement

=== Current fleet ===
As of August 2025, Volotea operates an all Airbus A320 family fleet composed of the following aircraft:

Volotea fleet
Aircraft	In service	Orders	Passengers	Notes
Airbus A319-100	17	—	138	
Airbus A319-100	17	—	156	
Airbus A320-200	24	—	174	
Airbus A320-200	24	—	180	
Total	41	—		

=== Historical fleet ===
Former fleet
Aircraft	Total	Introduced	Retired	Notes
Boeing 717-200	19	2012	2021	Last European operator.

== Accidents and incidents ==
- On 8 July 2025, a man died after trespassing onto the taxiway of Milan Bergamo Airport in Italy and was ingested into one of the engines of a Volotea Airbus A319 departing to Asturias, Spain. The incident is currently being treated as a suspected suicide.

== Award and recognition ==
On 24 June 2024, Volotea was voted 2024 Best Low-Cost Airline in Europe by Skytrax.
