= Tracy Cramer =

American politician

Member of the Oregon House of Representatives from the 22nd district
- In office January 9, 2023 – January 13, 2025
- Preceded by: Teresa Alonso Leon
- Succeeded by: Lesly Muñoz

Personal details
- Born: Gervais, Oregon, U.S.
- Party: Republican
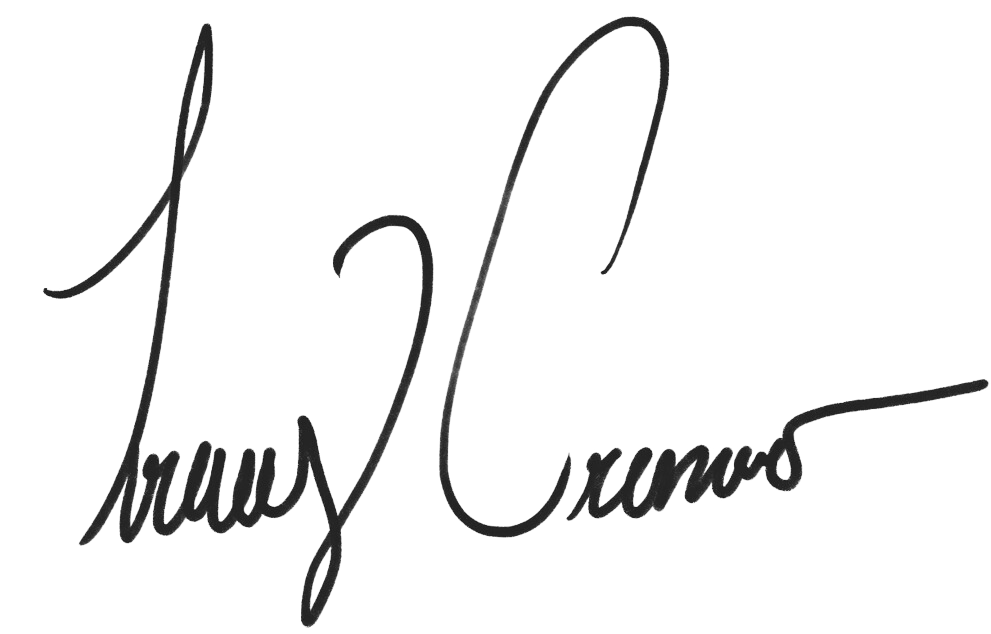
- Signature

Tracy Cramer is a Republican politician in Oregon. She served in the Oregon House of Representatives for District 22 from 2023 to 2025, representing parts of Marion county, including the cities of Woodburn, Gervais, Brooks, and Salem.

== Early life and career ==
Cramer was born and raised in Gervais, Oregon. She graduated from Gervais High School and worked as a dental assistant. She and her husband Jake have three children.

== Political career ==
In the 2022 Oregon House of Representatives election, Cramer defeated Democrat Anthony Medina.

In her first term in office, Cramer sponsored legislation in favor of school choice, to provide record funding for Oregon public schools, repeal Measure 110, and put tighter restrictions on the possession and use of fentynal. She also supported legislation aimed at addressing Oregon's housing shortage, including specific funding for housing for agricultural workers and victims of sexual and domestic violence.

Cramer was a member of the House Education Committee, House Early Childhood and Human Services Committee, and the Education budget committee.

Cramer opposed a move by the Oregon State Board of Education to suspend graduation standards in Oregon high schools for another four years, following the Legislature's suspension in 2021. She told the Oregon Capital Chronicle at the time: "I think the bigger issue here is that the board has continued to remove standards and has not come up with a game plan,” she said. “I think that’s why parents and Oregonians are kind of frustrated. Just because graduation rates are improving, it doesn’t mean proficiency is.”

Cramer has been one of the most anti-abortion members of the Oregon legislature. Staunchly pro-life, Cramer was a chief sponsor of HB 3420 and a regular sponsor of HB 2526 and HB 2424 in the 2023 legislative session.

Cramer voted against a bill (HB 2697) in 2023 that required staffing ratios of a certain level in Oregon hospitals. After passage, Oregon's largest nurses union, Oregon Nursing Association, expressed concern about the subsequent rulemaking that make it overly complicated for emergency departments and their staff.

She challenged the Oregon Department of Early Learning and Care — a new executive branch agency tasked with overseeing various preschool and early childhood education programs — about alleged misuse of taxpayer funds. The Department of accused of spending millions of dollars on preschool slots that were never filled.

Cramer was one of 29 legislators to vote no on SB184, legislation that requires payments made to independent contractors be reported to the state for child support collecting purposes.

In the 2024 Oregon House of Representatives election, Cramer was narrowly defeated by Democratic challenger and education consultant Lesly Muñoz.

== Electoral history ==
2022 Oregon State Representative, 22nd district
Party	Candidate	Votes	%
Republican	Tracy M Cramer	8,742	51.5
Democratic	Anthony Medina	8,200	48.3
Write-in		37	0.2
Total votes		16,979	100%

2024 Oregon State Representative, 22nd district
Party	Candidate	Votes	%
Democratic	Lesly M Munoz	10,480	50.3
Republican	Tracy M Cramer	10,319	49.5
Write-in		36	0.2
Total votes		20,835	100%
