= Oregon's 22nd House district =

Legislative districts in the state of Oregon

Oregon's 22nd House district after redistricting after the 2020 Census

District 22 of the Oregon House of Representatives is one of 60 House legislative districts in the state of Oregon. As of 2021, the district is contained entirely within Marion County and contains Hayesville, Gervais, Woodburn, and northeastern Salem. The current representative for the district is Democrat Lesly Muñoz of Salem.

== Election results ==
District boundaries have changed over time. Therefore, representatives before 2021 may not represent the same constituency as today. General election results from 2000 to present are as follows:

Year	Candidate	Party	Percent	Opponent	Party	Percent	Opponent	Party	Percent	Opponent	Party	Percent	Write-in percentage
2000	Laurie Monnes Anderson	Democratic	53.27%	Edwin Golobay	Republican	46.73%	No third candidate			No fourth candidate			
2002 (Note: Cliff Zauner was the incumbent in this election. He previously represented District 38, but was moved to this district due to redistricting following the 2000 United States census.)	Cliff Zauner	Republican	50.21%	Betty Komp	Democratic	49.41%	No third candidate			No fourth candidate			0.38%
2004	Betty Komp	Democratic	55.30%	Al Shannon	Republican	44.70%	No third candidate			No fourth candidate			
2006	Betty Komp	Democratic	51.44%	Carl Wienecke	Republican	32.16%	Michael Paul Marsh	Constitution	3.37%	No fourth candidate			0.20%
2008	Betty Komp	Democratic	67.36%	Tom Chereck, Jr.	Republican	32.16%	No third candidate			No fourth candidate			0.48%
2010	Betty Komp	Democratic	52.19%	Kathy LeCompte	Republican	47.46%	No third candidate			No fourth candidate			0.35%
2012	Betty Komp	Democratic	53.50%	Kathy LeCompte	Republican	46.06%	No third candidate			No fourth candidate			0.44%
2014	Betty Komp	Democratic	52.46%	Matt Geiger	Republican	42.85%	Marney Thad	Libertarian	2.26%	Michael Paul Marsh	Constitution	2.03%	0.40%
2016	Teresa Alonso Leon	Democratic	55.27%	Patricia Milne	Republican	44.38%	No third candidate			No fourth candidate			0.35%
2018	Teresa Alonso Leon	Democratic	59.63%	Marty Heyen	Republican	40.16%	No third candidate			No fourth candidate			0.20%
2020	Teresa Alonso Leon	Democratic	56.74%	Anna Kasachev	Republican	42.98%	No third candidate			No fourth candidate			0.28%
2022	Tracy Cramer	Republican	51.49%	Anthony Medina	Democratic	48.29%	No third candidate			No fourth candidate			0.22%
2024	Lesly Muñoz	Democratic	50.30%	Tracy Cramer	Republican	49.53%	No third candidate			No fourth candidate			0.17%

== See also ==
- Oregon Legislative Assembly
- Oregon House of Representatives
