= Sam Brown House =

Historic house in Oregon, United States

- U.S. National Register of Historic Places
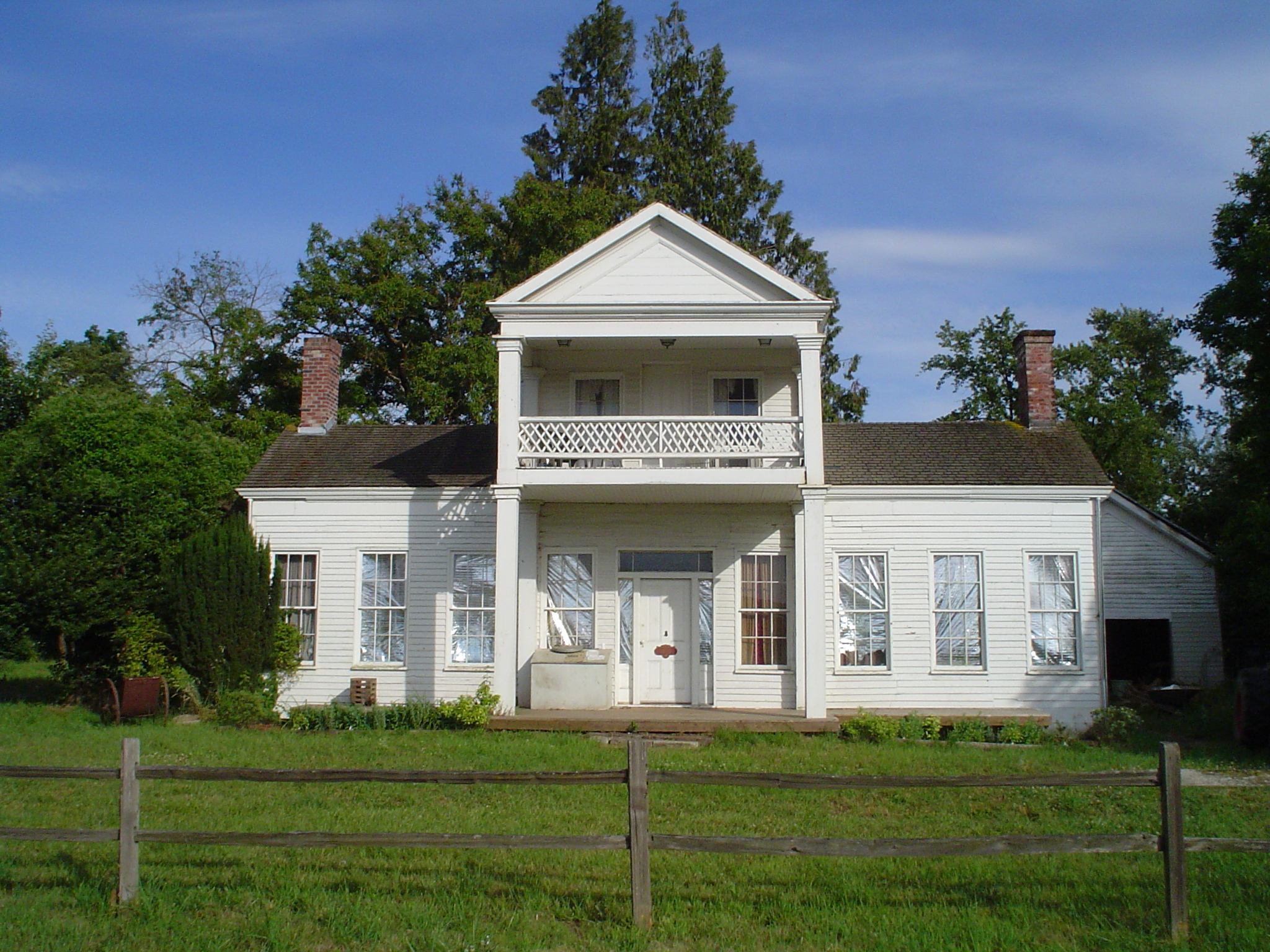
- Sam Brown House on Oregon Route 99E

- Location within Oregon Location within the United States
- Location: 12878 Portland Rd. NE; Gervais, Oregon
- Coordinates: 45°06′21″N 122°53′14″W
- Built: 1856-1857
- Architect: Sam Brown
- Architectural style: Classical Revival
- NRHP reference No.: 74001697
- Added to NRHP: November 5, 1974

Sam Brown House (or Samuel Brown House) is a historic house near Gervais, Oregon, United States built in 1857 by Oregon pioneer and state senator Samuel Brown (1821-1886). The house is located on the French Prairie on the Peter Depot land claim and is believed to be the first in Oregon to be designed by an architect.

The house was featured in the August 1986 issue of National Geographic Magazine, which described Samuel Brown as a Missourian who dug 62 pounds of gold in California and later moved with his wife to Oregon. The couple filed a Donation Land Claim and acquired more than 1,000 acres (4.0 km^{2}) and built their house near what is now the city of Gervais.

It served as a stage stop and housed three generations of the Browns. The son of the original Samuel Brown, Sam H. Brown, was a state senator and unsuccessfully ran for governor in 1934 and 1938.

The house was added to the National Register of Historic Places in 1974.

== See also ==
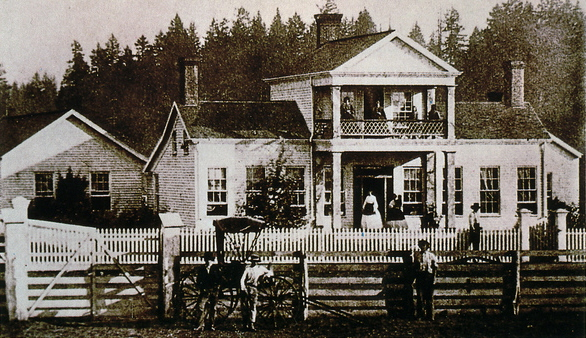
Sam Brown House in the 1880s

- List of Registered Historic Places in Marion County, Oregon
