= Munhoz (surname) =

Munhoz ([mu'ɲɔs] or [mu'ɲɔʃ]) is a Portuguese-language surname that originated from the Spanish-language variant Muñoz. Notable people with the surname include:

- Pablo Munhoz (born August 31, 1982), Uruguayan footballer
- Pedro Munhoz (born September 7, 1986), Brazilian mixed martial artist

== See also ==
- Munhoz, municipality in Brazil
- Munhoz de Melo, municipality in Brazil
