= Lesly Muñoz =

American politician

Member of the Oregon House of Representatives from the 22nd district
- Incumbent
- Assumed office January 13, 2025
- Preceded by: Tracy Cramer

Personal details
- Party: Democratic

Lesly Muñoz is an American labor organizer and Democratic politician currently serving in the Oregon House of Representatives, having first been elected in 2024. She represents the 22nd district, which is entirely within Marion County and consists of Hayesville, Gervais, and Woodburn as well as parts of Keizer and Salem.

== Career ==
Before entering the legislature, Muñoz was a labor organizer, working as a consultant with the Oregon Education Association.

Muñoz defeated incumbent Republican representative Tracy Cramer by just 161 votes in the 2024 election, with the race not being decided until November 26. While Cramer was up in the initial count on Election Day, vote counts 10 days after put Muñoz ahead by just one vote, with her lead growing from there. Muñoz's victory allowed Democrats to reclaim the three-fifths supermajority in both the Oregon House and Senate which they had lost in 2022.

Muñoz attended and spoke at the 2025 May Day protests in Oregon, speaking to attendees about the importance of immigrants in American society. Muñoz opposes allowing Immigration and Customs Enforcement (ICE) to conduct operations at schools. In 2026, Muñoz rebuked her fellow legislative Democrats in the state for being too "soft" on the issue after they passed a bill requiring schools to notify parents if ICE agents enter the school. Muñoz pointed to the increased restrictions obtained by the teachers' union in her local school district as a stronger example.

== Personal life ==
The daughter of Mexican immigrants, Muñoz has four children and lives in Woodburn with her family. Her sister, Myrna Muñoz, is an education consultant who was elected to the Oregon State Senate in the 2026 election.

== Electoral history ==
2024 Oregon State Representative, 22nd district
Party	Candidate	Votes	%
Democratic	Lesly Muñoz	10,479	50.3
Republican	Tracy Cramer (incumbent)	10,318	49.5
Write-in		36	0.2
Total votes		20,833	100%
