= Myrna Muñoz =

Member-elect of the Oregon Senate from the 15th district
- Assuming office January 11, 2027
- Succeeding: Janeen Sollman

Personal details
- Party: Democratic
- Education: University of California, Berkeley (BA); Concordia University (MA)

Myrna Muñoz is an American politician and educational consultant who was elected to the Oregon State Senate representing Oregon's 15th Senate district, which comprises central Washington County, including most of Hillsboro as well as Forest Grove and Cornelius. Muñoz is a member of the Democratic Party and the Democratic Socialists of America.

== Early life and career ==
An educational consultant, Muñoz is the daughter of immigrants from Mexico. She graduated from the University of California, Berkeley with a BA in Rhetoric. She is the sister of Lesly Muñoz, who represents Oregon's 22nd House district in the Oregon House of Representatives.

== Political career ==
Muñoz defeated incumbent Janeen Sollman in the Democratic primary, differing with Sollman on progressive issues such as workers' rights and increasing taxes on the wealthy. In the 2026 Oregon State Senate election, she defeated Republican candidate Harold Hutchinson by a more than 2–1 margin.
