= Betty Komp =

American politician (born 1949)

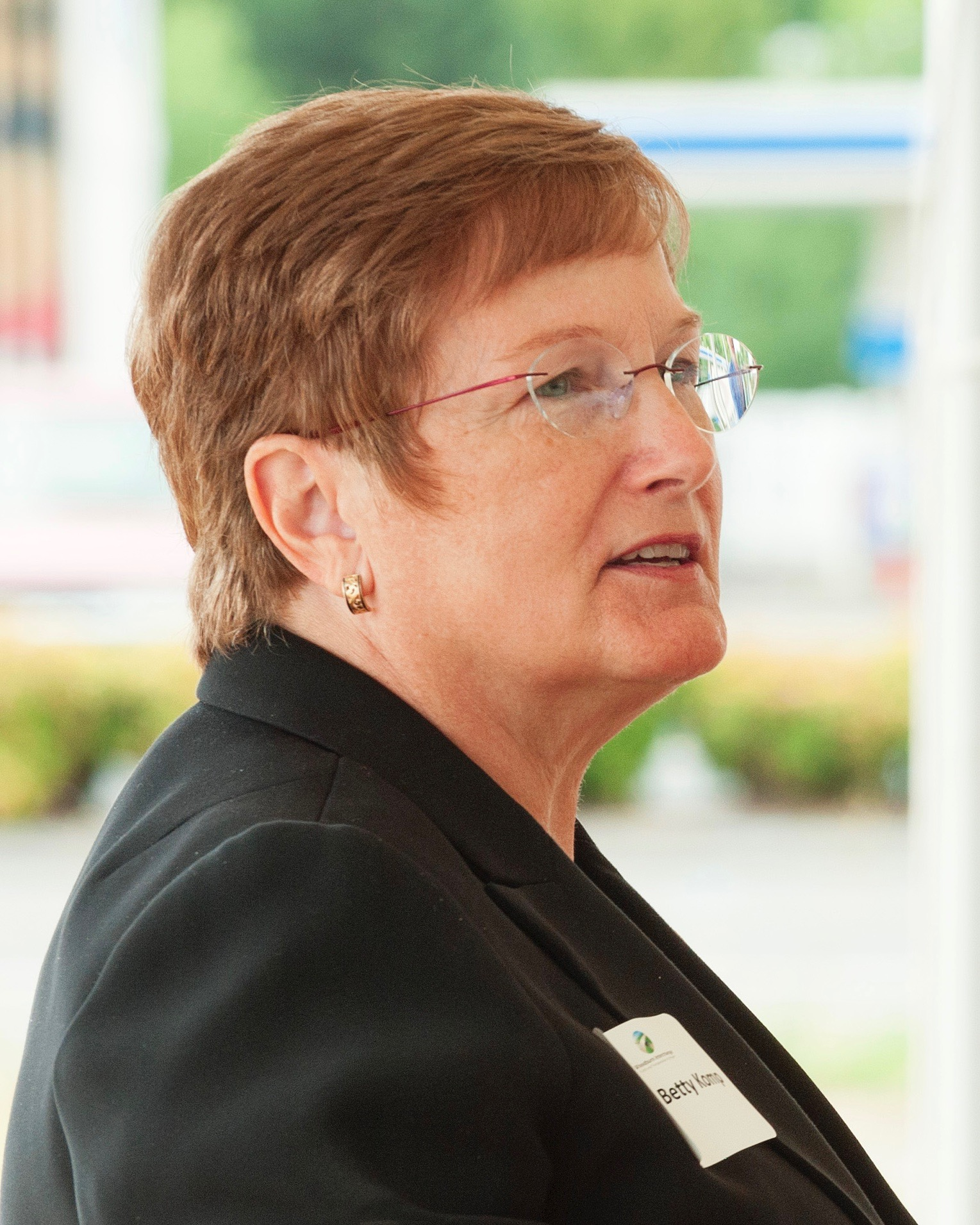

Member of the Oregon House of Representatives from the 22nd district
- In office 2005 – January 9, 2017
- Preceded by: Cliff Zauner
- Succeeded by: Teresa Alonso Leon

Personal details
- Born: 1949 (age 76–77) Silverton, Oregon
- Party: Democratic
- Education: Western Oregon University
- Profession: educator

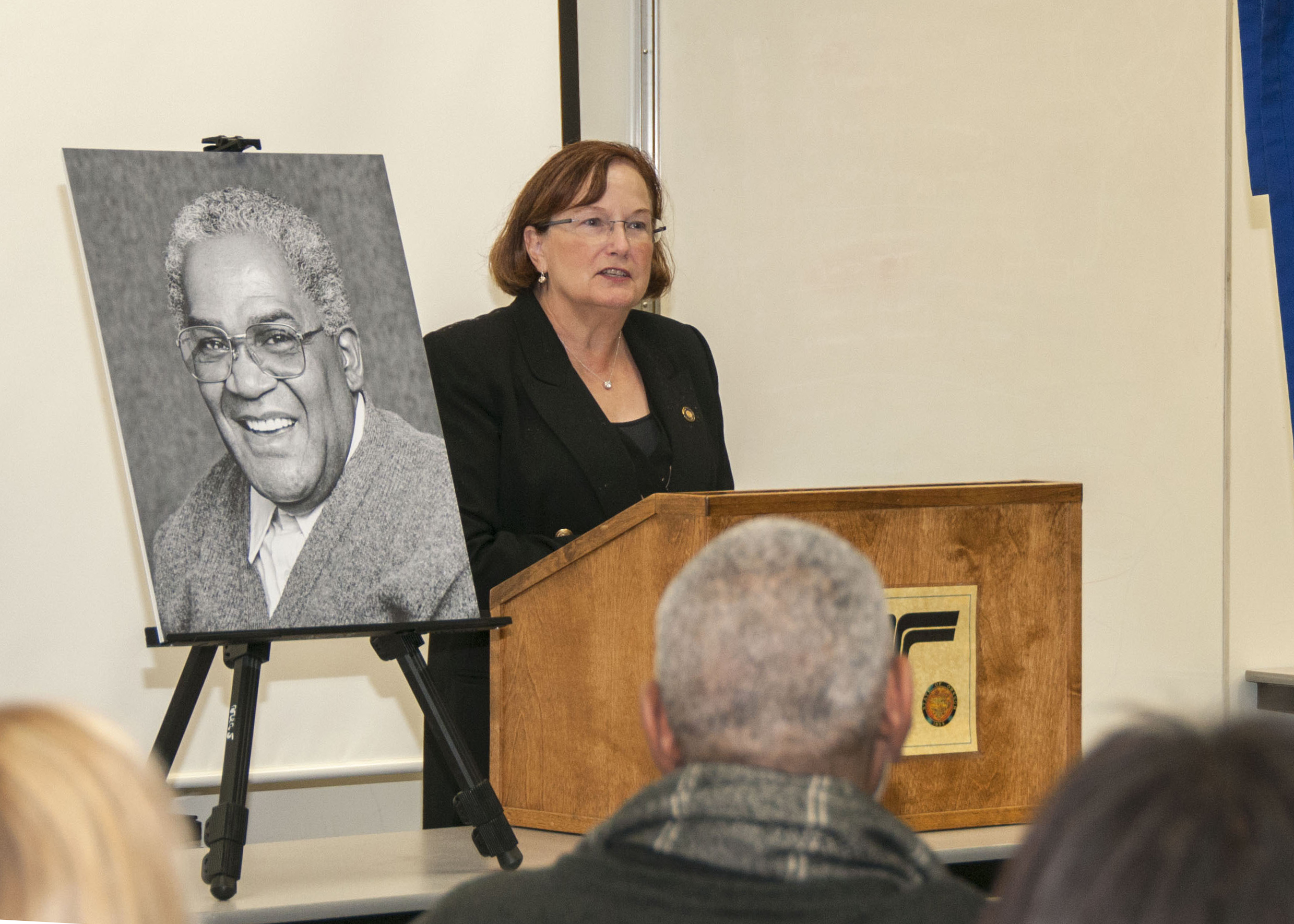
Komp in January 2016

Betty E. Komp (born 1949) is a Democratic former member of the Oregon House of Representatives, representing District 22 from 2004 to 2017.

== Early life ==
Komp has previously worked as a farm hand, youth minister, teacher, and assistant principal.

Despite being a single mom, Komp returned to college and earned her BS and MS in education from Western Oregon University.

== Personal life ==
Komp has four daughters and six grandchildren.

== Career ==
Betty Komp was formerly a member of the Oregon House of Representatives and served as Speaker Pro Tempore.

=== Political positions ===
- Made budget decisions as Chair of the Mt. Angel School Board
- Keep well-paying jobs
- stable funding for schools
- make sure tax dollars are spent wisely

== Electoral history ==
2004 Oregon State Representative, 22nd district
Party	Candidate	Votes	%
Democratic	Betty E. Komp	8,691	55.4
Republican	Al Shannon	6,941	44.2
Write-in		64	0.4
Total votes		15,696	100%

2006 Oregon State Representative, 22nd district
Party	Candidate	Votes	%
Democratic	Betty Komp	5,830	51.5
Republican	Carl Wieneke	5,090	45.0
Constitution	Michael Marsh	381	3.4
Write-in		22	0.2
Total votes		11,323	100%

2008 Oregon State Representative, 22nd district
Party	Candidate	Votes	%
Democratic	Betty Komp	9,753	67.4
Republican	Tom M Chereck, Jr	4,656	32.2
Write-in		69	0.5
Total votes		14,478	100%

2010 Oregon State Representative, 22nd district
Party	Candidate	Votes	%
Democratic	Betty Komp	6,083	52.5
Republican	Kathy LeCompte	5,460	47.1
Write-in		41	0.4
Total votes		11,584	100%

2012 Oregon State Representative, 22nd district
Party	Candidate	Votes	%
Democratic	Betty Komp	7,524	53.5
Republican	Kathy LeCompte	6,478	46.1
Write-in		62	0.4
Total votes		14,064	100%

2014 Oregon State Representative, 22nd district
Party	Candidate	Votes	%
Democratic	Betty Komp	6,523	52.5
Republican	Matt Geiger	5,329	42.9
Libertarian	Thad Marney	281	2.3
Constitution	Michael P Marsh	252	2.0
Write-in		50	0.4
Total votes		12,435	100%
