= Teresa Alonso Leon =

American politician (born 1975)

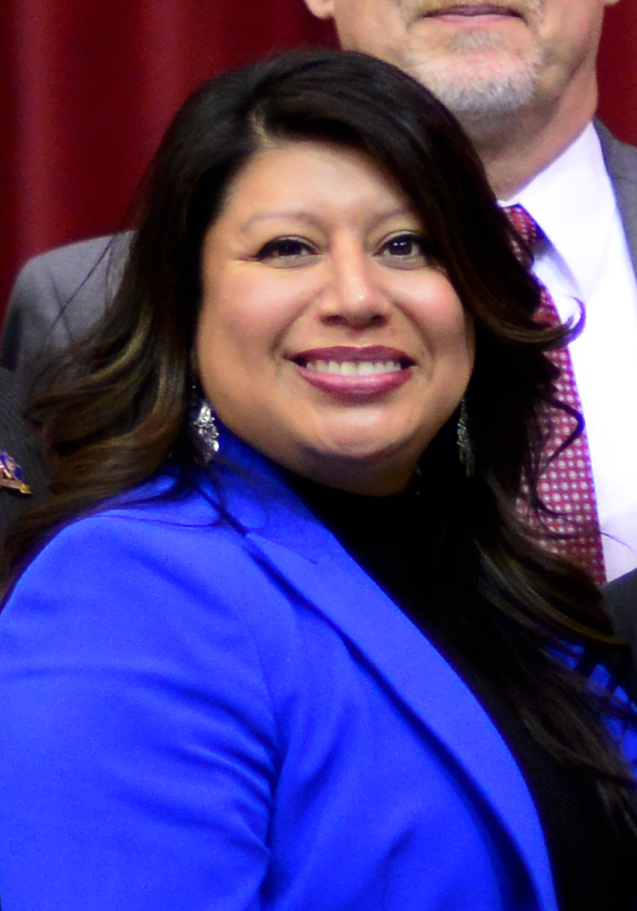

Member of the Oregon House of Representatives from the 22nd district
- In office January 9, 2017 – January 9, 2023
- Preceded by: Betty Komp
- Succeeded by: Tracy Cramer

Personal details
- Born: 1975 (age 50–51) Michoacán, Mexico
- Party: Democratic
- Education: Western Oregon University (BA); Portland State University (MPA)

Teresa Alonso Leon (born 1975) is an American Democratic politician who served in the Oregon House of Representatives for three terms from 2017 to 2023. She represented the 22nd district, which covers parts of Marion County along Interstate 5, from Woodburn down to northern Salem.

== Biography ==
Alonso Leon was born in the Mexican state of Michoacán and moved to Gervais, Oregon at the age of 4. She self-identifies as an Indigenous Mexican and a member of the Purépecha community. She graduated with a bachelor's degree from Western Oregon University in 2002, and with a master's degree in Public Administration from Portland State University in 2013. Alonso Leon, who became a United States citizen in 2012, was appointed to the Woodburn City Council in 2013.

In December 2015, Alonso Leon announced her candidacy for the House seat vacated by the retiring Betty Komp. She defeated Republican Patti Milne, a former state representative, in the general election with 55% of the vote. Alonso Leon became the first immigrant Latina elected to the Oregon legislature.

== Electoral history ==
2016 Oregon State Representative, 22nd District
Party	Candidate	Votes	%
Democratic	Teresa Alonso Leon	9,604	55.3
Republican	Patti Milne	7,711	44.4
Write-in		61	0.4
Total votes		17,376	100%

2018 Oregon State Representative, 22nd District
Party	Candidate	Votes	%
Democratic	Teresa Alonso Leon	9,630	59.6
Republican	Marty Heyen	6,486	40.2
Write-in		33	0.2
Total votes		16,149	100%

2020 Oregon State Representative, 22nd District
Party	Candidate	Votes	%
Democratic	Teresa Alonso Leon	12,168	56.7
Republican	Anna Kasachev	9,218	43.0
Write-in		59	0.3
Total votes		21,445	100%
