= Andrés Fischer Muñoz =

Colombian-American painter (born 1965)

Andrés "Andreas" Fischer Muñoz (born 1965) is a Colombian-American realist painter living in Switzerland.

== Biography ==
Fischer was born into an artistic family in 1965 in Bogotá, to a Colombian father and an American mother. He studied art at the University of the Andes, Colombia (Arts and Humanities School), where he exhibited at its Marta Traba Gallery and obtained his bachelor's in 1990. He also exhibited at other institutions, and his graduate thesis and first solo exhibition was "A partir de la poesia" at the Gartner-Torres Gallery. In July 1991, he moved to New York City; He performed postgraduate work at the nondegree fine arts college Art Students League of New York, for four years, earned a master's in fine arts at Pratt Institute, and held twelve exhibitions in New York City, Chicago, Colombia, and the Dominican Republic. He continued his career by moving to Bern, Switzerland, in 2004; he speaks Spanish, English, and German. He is also a yoga practitioner, and has adopted German painter Gerhard Richter's slogan, "Painting is dead, but who cares?"

== Art ==
During the Colombian period, he stated that each of his works were inspired by a poem of Fernando Pessoa, whom he considers the "poeta del desasosiego" (poet of disquiet).

His one-month solo ultrarealist art exhibition, "Parejas" ("Couples"), at the Beatrice Brunner Gallery in Bern in 2006, displayed seven diptych paintings depicting seminude individuals in pairs but separated deconstructively by whitespace, staring at the viewers. One half of one of the diptychs was stolen prior to the exhibition. Inspired by Fischer's study of the historical artistic representation of relationships in society and painted over the course of five years, the enigmatic paintings emphasize the necessity of individuality in all relationships; the relationship between the couples is left unstated. Fischer explained, "It was intended that the couple needs a space and that that space contains a distance between the two individuals, and that that space is important."

Paintings in the photorealist series include Carolina and Juan (2004), in which Juan, on the edge of the painting, appears indecisive about remaining in the image or abandoning the common space; Lauren and Dean; Maria and Deuxchevs (2006); Ralph (2003); and Sarah and Michael. They were painted according to photos taken of the model couples early in the morning, shortly after waking, to obtain intimate portraits. The whitespace was inspired by Wanderer above the Sea of Fog, by Caspar David Friedrich, while the distance between each couple was inspired by royal portraiture such as Francisco Goya's painting The Family of Charles IV. Curator Beatrice Brunner stated that reception was "magnificent": patrons included Berner Zeitung journalist and critic Konrad Tobler, and painter and philosopher Angelica Baum.

These paintings were re-exhibited when Fischer, and three older Colombian artists who had immigrated to Switzerland since 1972, participated in a joint exhibit commemorating the centennial of the Colombian-Swiss peace treaty of March 14, 1908. Colombian ambassador Claudia Jiménez sponsored the exhibit, and critic Tobler stated that Fischer's art focuses much more on the psychological aspect than the photographic, in the photorealist tradition.

== Exhibitions ==
- Seventh Salón Séneca, University of the Andes, Colombia, 1988.
- "Traspies" (video), Art Faculty Meeting, University of Nariño, Pasto, 1988.
- "Dance" (stage scenery for video), Karim Noack, director, 1988.
- Marta Traba Photography Salon, University of the Andes, Colombia, 1988-1989.
- Eighth Salón Séneca, University of the Andes, Colombia, 1989.
- Ceramics Exposition, National University of Medellin, Colombia, 1989.
- "La Prensa, One Year" (illustrator), Museum of Modern Art, Bogotá, 1990.
- "A partir de la poesía" (solo), Gartner-Torres Gallery, Colombia, December 6–7, 1991.
- Art Students League of New York Gallery, New York, 1993.
- "Dumbo Art Festival", K2 Studio, Brooklyn, 1995.
- "Art-Iberoamerica 96", Chicago Cultural Center, Chicago, 1996.
- "Exploring the North", Stendhal Gallery, New York, 1996.
- "Generación intermedia", Luís Ángel Arango Museum (Banco de la Republica), Colombia, 1998.
- "Bodies in Transit" (solo), Steuben West Gallery (Pratt Institute), New York, 1999.
- "Fall Artist Series", Element AG Art Space, Chelsea, 2000.
- "The Alchemical Body", Williamsburg Cultural Art Center, Brooklyn, 2001.
- Caribbean Biannual, Santo Domingo, 2002.
- New York Art Expo, Peter Rose Gallery, New York, 2002.
- "Expansive Wave: Eight Years", Lyle O'Reitzel Gallery, Dominican Republic, 2003.
- "Urbes Interiores", BLAA Museum, Colombia, 2004.
- "Porträt", PROGR and Kunstkeller, Bern, 2005.
- Art Zürich International, Zürich, 2006.
- "Parejas" ("Couples", solo), Beatrice Brunner Gallery, Bern, August 26 to September 23, 2006.
- "1, 2, 3, 4 Pintores Colombíanos en Suiza", Park Gallery (Franz Gertsch Museum), Burgdorf, 2008.
- "Fil Rouge 08", Steiner Gallery, Switzerland, November 23 to December 21, 2008.

== Honors ==
- First prize, "Manitas Libres" Painting Contest, Cuban Embassy, 1978.
- Second prize (mural), Architectonic Project of Iglesia Ciudad Salitre, National Society of Architects of Colombia, 1991.
- First runner-up, Travel Grant, Art Students League of New York, 1994.
- Fellowship Grant, Organization of American States, District of Columbia, 1996.
- Nomination, Royal Academy, The Starr Foundation, London, 1997.
- Excellence Prize, Pratt Institute, New York, 1997.
