= Sam Browne (disambiguation) =

Sam Browne may refer to:

- Sam Browne (1824–1901), British Indian Army general
  - Sam Browne belt, item of clothing named for Sir Sam Browne
- Sam Browne (musician) (1898–1972), British dance band singer

== See also ==
- Samuel Browne (disambiguation)
- Sam Brown (disambiguation)
- Samuel Brown (disambiguation)
