= Samuel Brown (Oregon politician) =

American politician (1821–1886)

Member of the Oregon Senate
- In office 1866–1872

Personal details
- Born: 1821 Pennsylvania, U.S.
- Died: 1886 (aged 64–65)
- Children: Sam H. Brown (son)
- Occupation: Carpenter, Cabinetmaker, Politician, Pioneer

Samuel Brown (1821–1886) was an American pioneer and politician. He was a member of the Oregon State Senate from 1866 to 1872.

== Early life ==
He was born in Pennsylvania and moved to Indiana and then Missouri, where he was married. He worked as a carpenter and cabinet maker.

== Migration to Oregon ==
In 1846, he and his family went by wagon train to the American West Coast. They accompanied Jesse Applegate on what became known as the Applegate Trail.

He built a mill on the Feather River in California, and made $20,000 prospecting for gold.

The family then moved to Oregon, and had the Sam Brown House built near present-day Gervais in 1857; the house is thought to be the first architect-designed house built in the state.

Brown's son, Sam H. Brown, also served in the Oregon Senate, and ran for governor of Oregon in 1934 and 1938.

== See also ==
- List of people from Oregon
- List of people from Pennsylvania
