= Carlos Muñoz (businessman) =

Spanish businessman

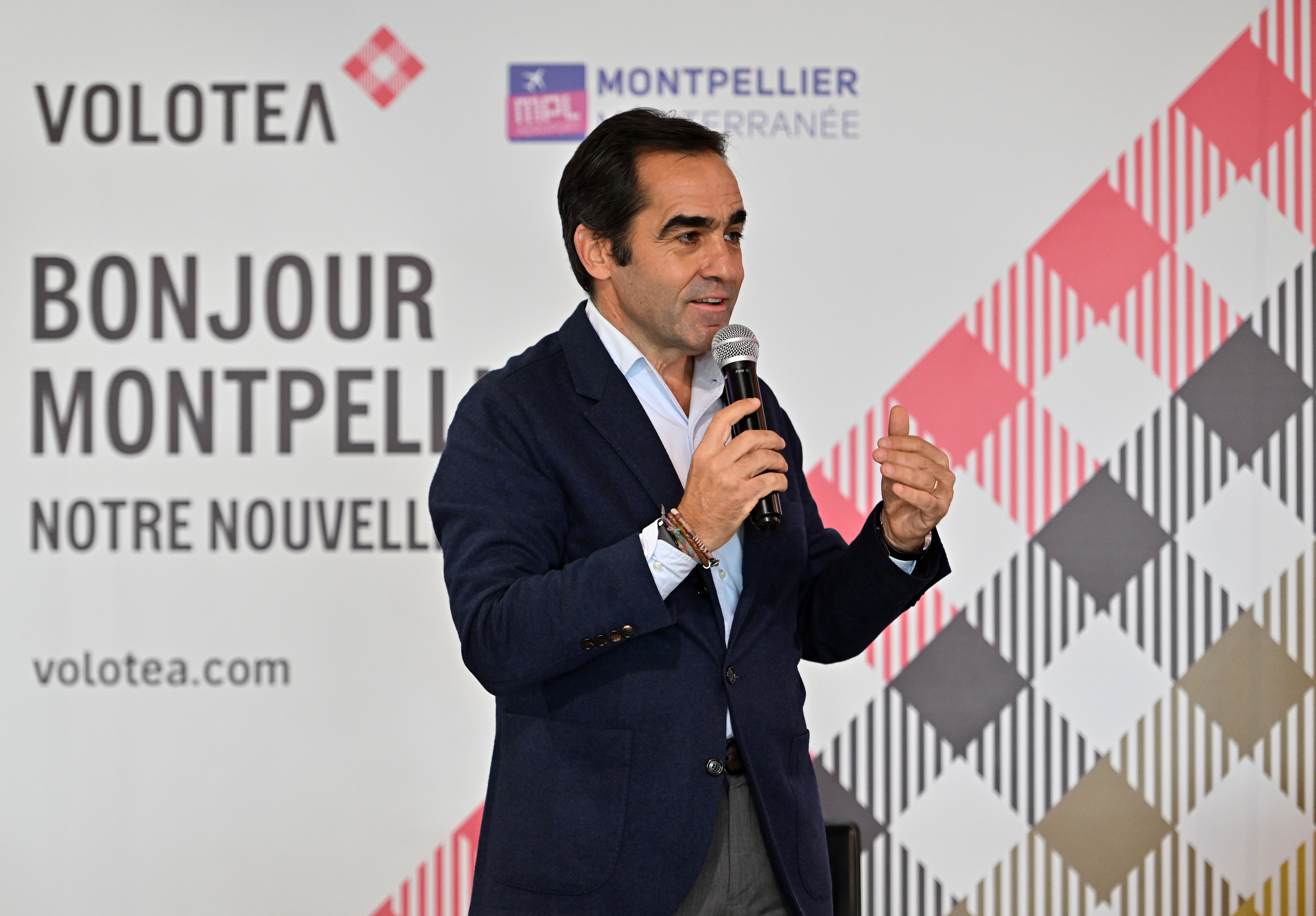
- Muñoz in January 2026
- Born: Carlos Muñoz; 1969 (age 56–57)
- Occupation: CEO of Volotea

Carlos Muñoz (born 1969 in Murcia) is a Spanish businessman in the commercial aviation sector. He is founder of the European low-cost airlines Vueling Airlines and Volotea.

Since 2011, he has been the CEO of Volotea, an airline specialized in connecting small and medium-sized cities across Europe.

== Professional career ==
He began his career at the family business AMC, dedicated to the export of fruit and citrus juices, where he worked for seven years. He later joined the consulting firm McKinsey & Company in California, where he was involved in projects related to the analysis of the low-cost carrier model becoming his first contact with the airline industry.

In late 2002, he co-founded the company Evia (European Ventures in Aviation), which became the basis for the creation of Vueling Airlines. The airline began operations in 2004 and was listed on the stock exchange in 2006. In the same year, Iberia launched the low-cost airline Clickair, which became a major competitor for Vueling. Vueling’s shareholders supported a merger with Clickair, a proposal opposed by Carlos Muñoz, who left the company in 2007. In 2008, Clickair and Vueling completed their merger.

In 2011, together with Lázaro Ros, Carlos Muñoz founded the low-cost airline Volotea, focused on connecting medium-sized and small cities in Europe.

Volotea employs more than 2,000 people and is expected to operate around 420 routes in 2025. In the 2024 financial year, the airline reported revenue of €811 million. The company has 19 bases located in France, Italy, and Spain.
