= Arrate Gisasola =

Spanish footballer (born 1979)

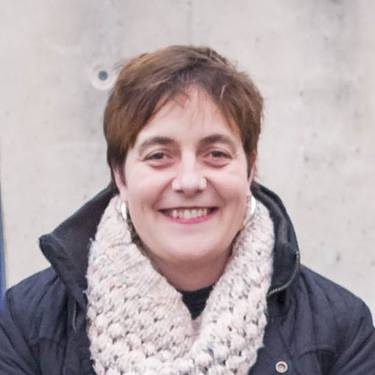

Personal information
- Full name: Arrate Gisasola Izeta
- Date of birth: 5 February 1979 (age 47)
- Position: Goalkeeper

Senior career*
Years	Team	Apps	(Gls)
1993–2003	Eibartarrak FT		

International career
- Spain
- * Club domestic league appearances and goals

Arrate Gisasola Izeta (born 5 February 1979) is a Spanish former international football goalkeeper who played for Eibartarrak FT.

== Club career ==
Gisasola began playing as a field player for Elbartarrak in 1993, then moved to goalkeeper. She played for Elbartarrak until 2003, before the club was renamed to SD Eibar.

== International career ==
Gisasola was third goalkeeper of the Spanish team at the 1997 European Championships that reached the semi-finals. She did not appear during the tournament.

== Honours ==
=== Club ===
Eibartarrak FT

- Supercopa de España: 1999
- Liga Nacional (first tier): runners-up 2000–01
