= José Muñoz =

José Muñoz may refer to:

== Sports ==
- José Muñoz Pérez (1869–1921), Spanish sports journalist and co-founder of Recreativo de Huelva
- José Muñoz (pitcher) (1881–1945), Cuban and Negro league baseball player
- José Muñoz (sports manager) (1940–2016), Spanish businessman, footballer, and sports manager
- José Muñoz (infielder) (born 1967), American baseball player
- José Muñoz (wrestler) (born 1968), Mexican luchador
- Jose Manuel Muñoz (born 1983), Spanish trampolinist
- José Roberto Muñoz (born 1983), Mexican football manager and former player
- José Luis Muñoz (born 1987), Chilean footballer
- José Muñoz (footballer) (born 1993), Panama footballer
- Pep Muñoz (born 1979), Spanish football manager

== Others ==
- José Antonio Muñoz (born 1942), a.k.a. Muñoz, Argentine artist and cartoonist
- José Muñoz Cortés (1948–1997), curator of the Iveron-Montreal Myrrh-streaming Icon of the Mother of God
- José Esteban Muñoz (1967–2013), U.S. Latino writer, academic
- José Muñoz (born 1978), Spanish flamenco-rock musician in the band Estopa
- José Muñoz Sánchez, Spanish politician
- José Luis Muñoz Soria (1948–2024), Mexican politician
