= Sam H. Brown =

American farmer and politician

Sam H. Brown was an American farmer and politician from Oregon.

== Career ==
He was a member of the Oregon State Senate, representing Marion County, in the early 20th century. He was the son of Samuel Brown.

Brown ran for governor of Oregon in 1934 and 1938, losing in the Republican primaries both times. According to the Eugene Register-Guard, he was not a conspicuous leader in the legislature.

== Personal life ==
The Sam Brown House in Gervais, Oregon, was named for his father.

== See also ==
- List of people from Oregon
- Politics of Oregon
