= Manuel Muñoz =

Manuel Muñoz may refer to:

- Manuel Muñoz (Governor of Spanish Texas) (1730–1799), soldier and governor of Spanish Texas
- Manuel Muñoz Martínez (1888–1942), Spanish army officer and Republican politician
- Manuel Muñoz Cornejo (1890–1959), Chilean academic and politician
- Manuel Muñoz Borrero (1891–1976), Ecuadorian diplomat, Righteous Among the Nations
- Manuel Muñoz Rodríguez (1917–1986), Mexican film director, Chucho el Roto (film) et al.
- Manuel Muñoz (footballer) (1928–2022), Chilean football forward
- Manuel Muñoz Rocha (born 1948, disappeared 1994), Mexican politician, indicted in the killing of José Francisco Ruiz Massieu
- Manuel Muñoz (writer) (born 1972), American short story writer
- Manuel Muñoz (canoeist) (born 1980), Spanish sprint canoer
- Manuel Muñoz Cano, Mexican politician, contended the 2023 Tamaulipas special election
