= Patti Milne =

American politician (born 1947/48)

Marion County Commissioner
- In office January 1999 – April 21, 2014
- Succeeded by: Kevin Cameron

Member of the Oregon House of Representatives from the 18th district
- In office January 11, 1993 – 1998
- Preceded by: Roger Beyer
- Succeeded by: Juley Gianella

Personal details
- Born: 1947 or 1948 (age 77–78)
- Party: Republican

Patricia R. Milne (born 1947/48) is an American politician from the state of Oregon. A Republican, she served in the Oregon House of Representatives from 1993 until 1998, and as a Marion County Commissioner from 1999 until 2014.

== Biography ==
Milne was elected to the Woodburn School Board in 1988, and to the state House of Representatives in 1992. She served three terms in the House, serving as Majority Whip in 1995, before retiring to run for the Marion County Board of Commissioners in 1998, serving until 2014.

In 2014, she ran for the Oregon Senate from district 11, losing to incumbent Democrat Peter Courtney with 45% of the vote.

In 2016, she ran again for the Oregon House from district 22, losing to Democrat Teresa Alonso Leon with 44% of the vote.

== Personal life ==
Milne and her husband, Stan, have 3 children: Trevor, Stephanie, and Laura, and two grandchildren.
