= Martín Muñoz de la Dehesa =

- Municipality
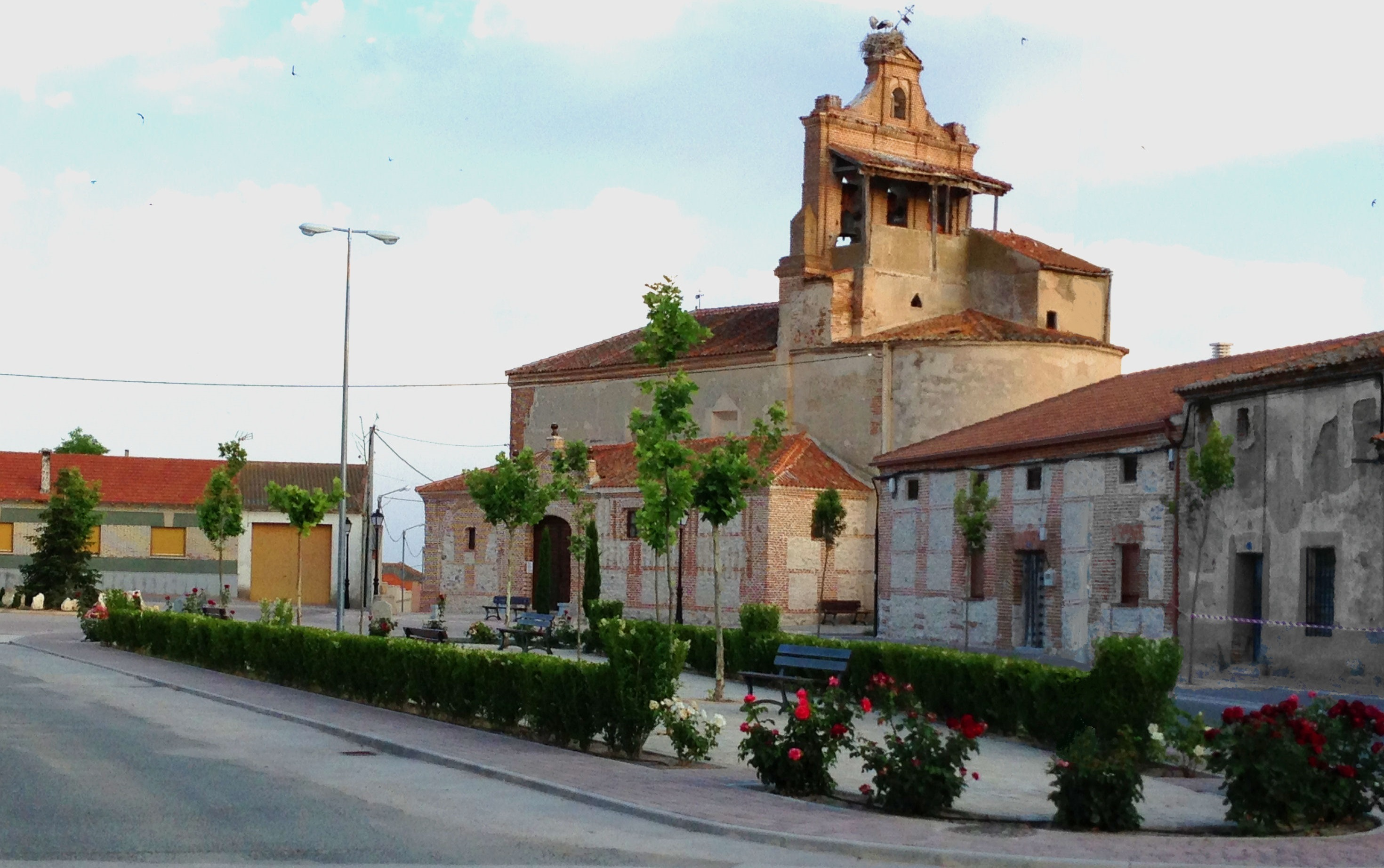
- View of the Plaza de Martín Muñoz de la Dehesa in the province of Segovia.

- Flag Coat of arms

- Location in Spain. Martín Muñoz de la Dehesa (Spain)
- Coordinates: 41°03′58″N 4°41′12″W
- Country: Spain
- Autonomous community: Castile and León
- Province: Segovia
- Municipality: Martín Muñoz de la Dehesa

Area
  - Total: 17 km^{2} (6.6 sq mi)

Population (2025-01-01)
  - Total: 309
  - Density: 18/km^{2} (47/sq mi)
- Time zone: UTC+1 (CET)
  - Summer (DST): UTC+2 (CEST)
- Website: Official website

Martín Muñoz de la Dehesa is a municipality located in the province of Segovia, Castile and León, Spain. According to the 2004 census (INE), the municipality has a population of 188 inhabitants.
