= Art Zurich =

Public art fair in Zürich, Switzerland

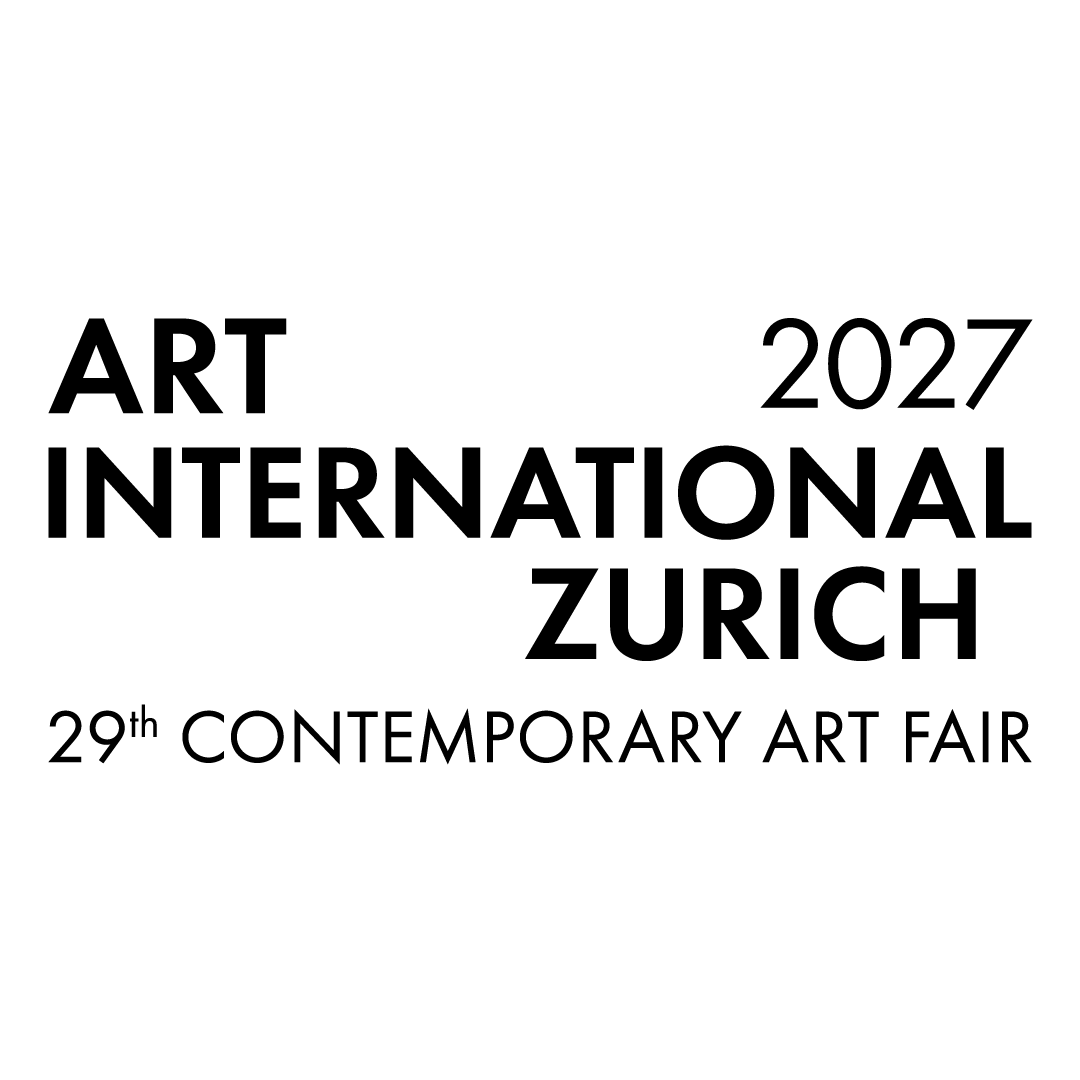
logo: Art International Zurich

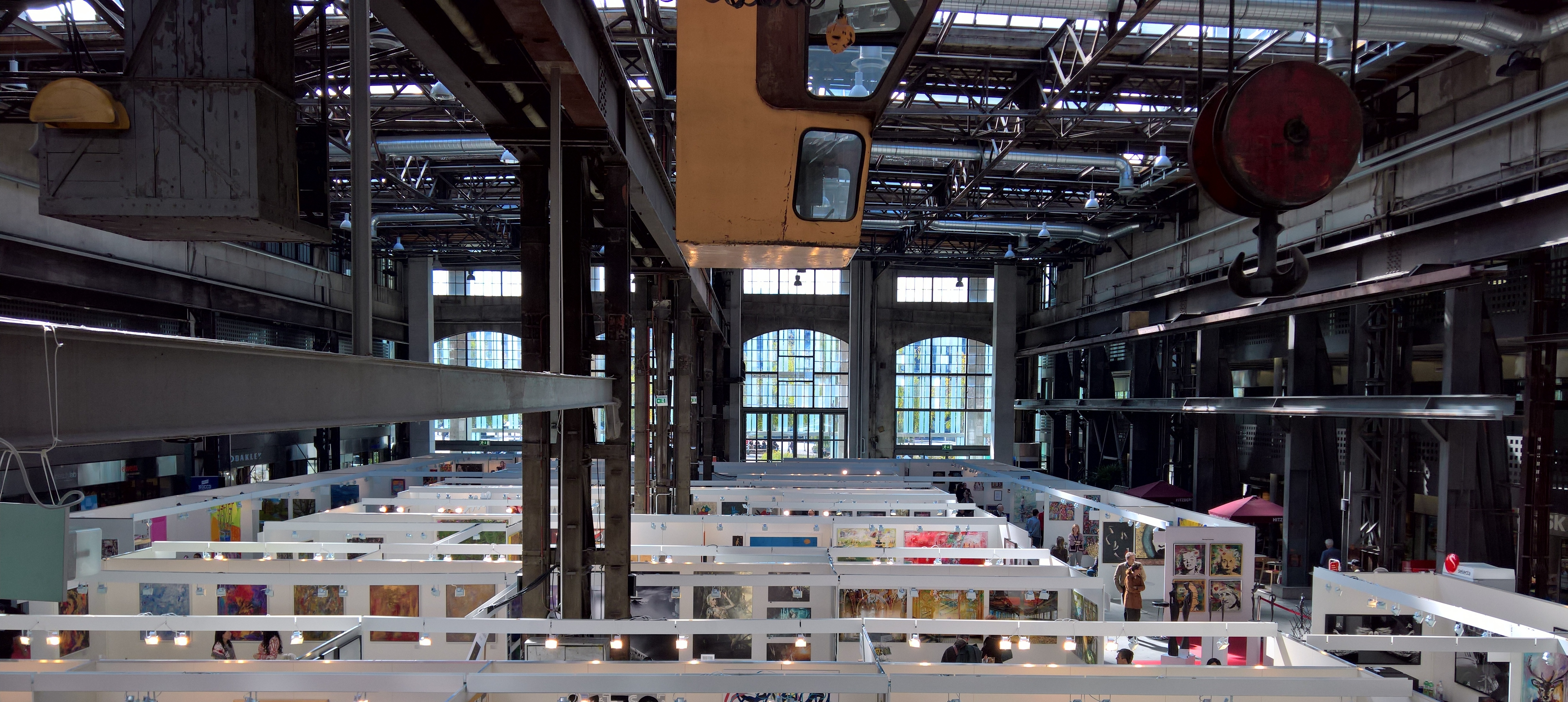
Art Fair Zurich 2017

Art International Zurich, also known as Art Zurich and Contemporary Art Fair Zurich, is a public art fair in Zürich, Switzerland. The fair showcases contemporary art styles, including painting, sculpture, photography, graphic, video and art objects. More than 1000 exhibitors from 70 countries have participated in the art fair established in 1999.

Since its inception, this art fair has enjoyed a steady upward trend, which can be attributed above all to the cosmopolitan mix of internationality and artistic diversity. The fair has thus developed into an institution in the Swiss art scene. Since the early 2000s, the focus has been on exhibitors from Asia in particular, complemented by american galleries and since the 2020s by galleries from African countries.

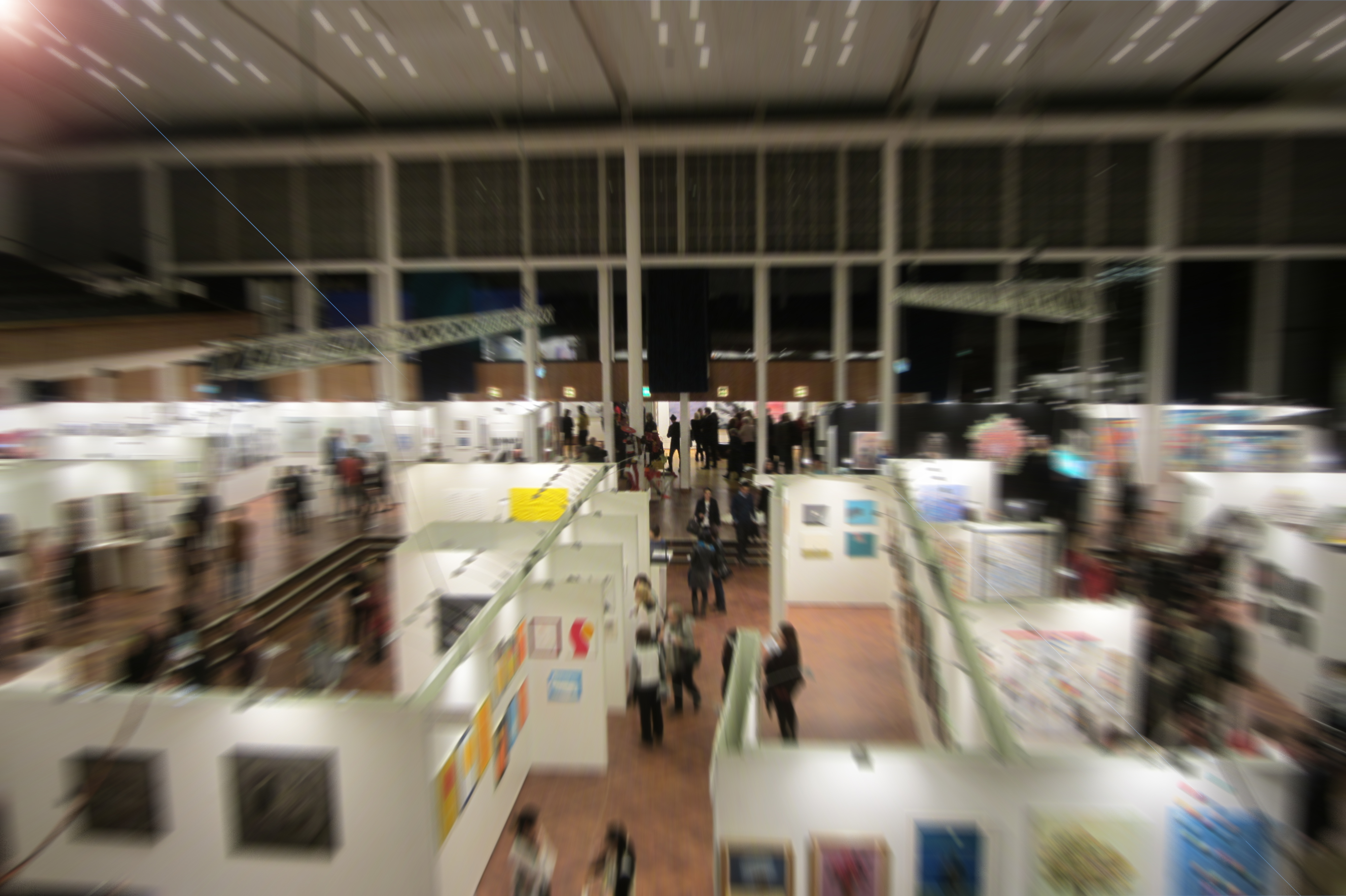
Photo from Art Zurich

The fair usually takes place from Friday to Sunday, with an evening vernissage for VIP guests. Depending upon availability, the public is allowed to participate, with an entry charge.

Alongside art cities New York and London, Zurich is one of the world's leading art trading cities and houses more than 100 galleries and over 50 museums.

== History ==
In 2017, due to renovations at Kongresshaus Zürich, the fair moved to the historic foundry hall Puls 5 in Zurich West. The new venue was very well received by the public.

== See also ==
- Art Basel
- Culture of Switzerland
