= Patio Muñoz =

Patio Muñóz is a neighborhood of the city of Xalapa in the state of Veracruz in eastern Mexico.

The neighborhood is known for its lively performances featuring musicians and dancers and other forms of artistic display. Fandango performances are a common sight in Patio Muñoz.
