= Rafael Muñoz =

Rafael Muñoz may refer to:

- Rafael Muñoz (swimmer) (born 1988), Spanish swimmer
- Rafael Muñoz (journalist) (1899–1972), Mexican journalist and writer
- Rafael Muñoz (musician) (died 1961), Puerto Rican big band director
- Rafael Muñoz Núñez (1925–2010), bishop of the Roman Catholic Diocese of Aguascalientes, Mexico
- Rafael Calderón Muñoz (1869–1943), Costa Rican politician
- Rafa Muñoz (born 1966), Spanish retired footballer and manager
