= David Muñoz =

David Muñoz may refer to:

- David Muñoz (director) (born 1968), Spanish director, producer and screenwriter
- David Muñoz (chef) (born 1980), Spanish chef
- David Muñoz (cyclist) (born 1979), Spanish cyclist
- David Muñoz (motorcyclist) (born 2006), Spanish motorcyclist
- David Muñoz (sport shooter) (born 1964), Panamanian sports shooter
- David Ibarra Muñoz (born 1930), Mexican economist
- David Muñoz (footballer) (born 1997), Spanish footballer
