= Michael Unser =

Swiss engineer (born 1958)

Professor Michael Unser
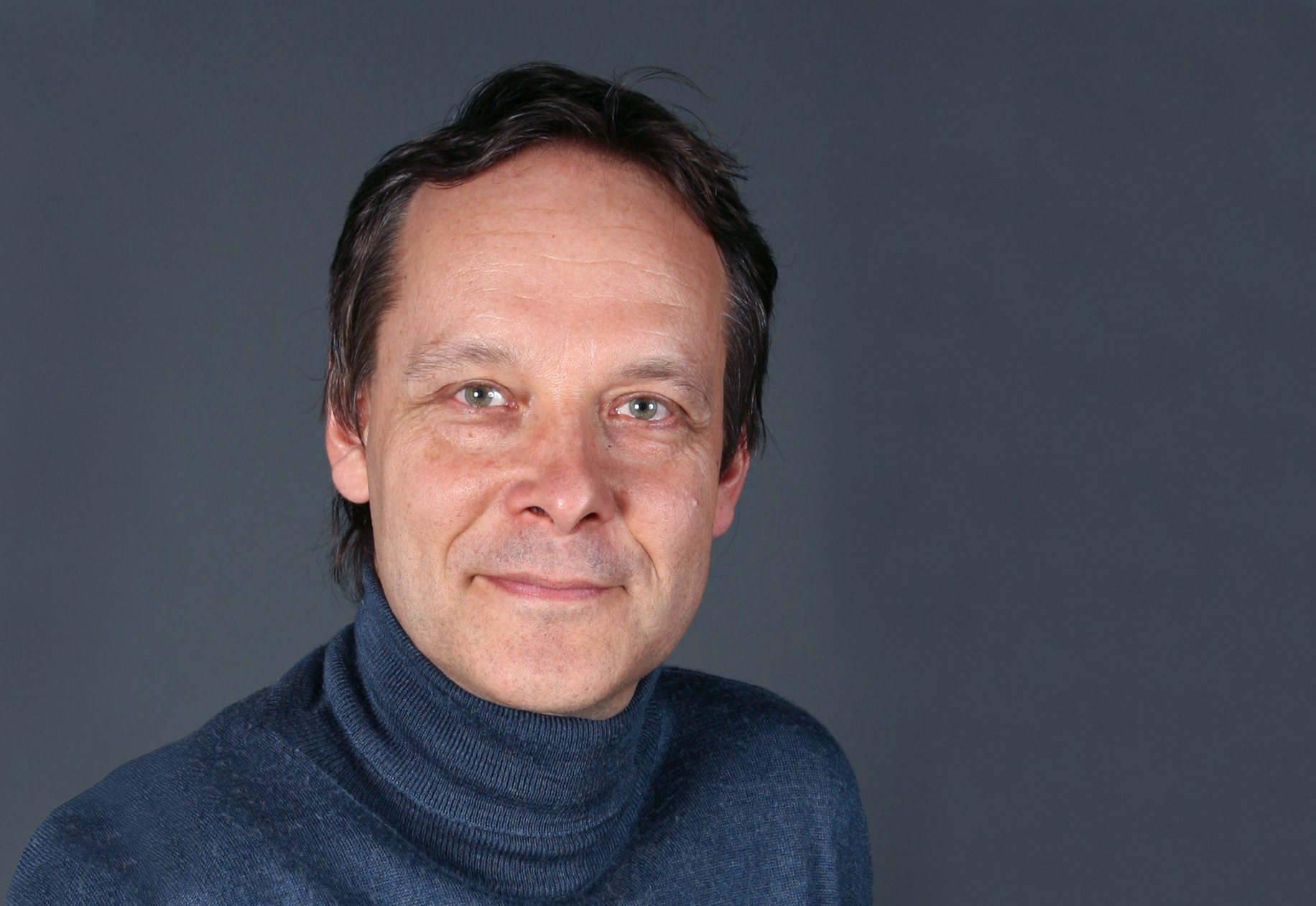
- Michael Unser in 2009
- Born: April 9, 1958 (age 68); Zug, Switzerland

Academic background
- Education: École Polytechnique Fédérale de Lausanne

Academic work
- Institutions: École Polytechnique Fédérale de Lausanne (EPFL)
- Doctoral students: Arrate Muñoz Barrutia
- Main interests: Signal processing, biomedical imaging
- Website: http://bigwww.epfl.ch/index.html

Michael Unser (born April 9, 1958) is a Swiss engineer and a professor at the École Polytechnique Fédérale de Lausanne (EPFL). His research focuses on the field of biomedical image processing.

== Career ==
Unser obtained a M.S. in 1981 and a PhD in 1984 in electrical engineering from EPFL. In 1985, he moved to the National Institutes of Health in Bethesda, Maryland, where he worked as a post-doctoral fellow in the Biomedical Engineering and Instrumentation Program. There, he became head of the Image Processing Group in 1990. In 1997, he was named associate professor at EPFL, where he was promoted full professor in 2000. In 2021, he was named academic director of the EPFL Center for Imaging.

== Research ==
Unser heads the biomedical image processing group at the School of Engineering of EPFL. His research focuses on the development of mathematical tools and algorithms for the analysis of medical and biomedical images, notably for image reconstruction and multi-modal imaging.

Unser's group was among the first to promote the use of wavelets as mathematical tools in biology and medicine. Unser has notably pioneered their use in the analysis of fMRI and PET imaging data.

== Distinctions ==
As of 2020, Unser's publications had been cited over 50,000 times and his H-index was 102, owing him to figure on the list of highly cited researchers in engineering.

Unser received three Advanced Grants (2010 & 2015 & 2021) from the European Research Council for research projects on signal processing, bioimaging, and functional learning.

He is a recipient of the IEEE Signal Processing Society's 1995 Best Paper Award (together with A. Aldroubi and M. Eden), of the IEEE Signal Processing Society's 2000 Magazine Award, and the IEEE Signal Processing Society's 2003 Best Paper Award (with T. Blu).

In 2018, Unser was awarded the Technical Achievement Award by the European Association for Signal Processing.

In 2020, he was awarded the 2020 IEEE Engineering in Biology and Medicine Society Academic Career Achievement Award.

== Bibliography ==
Together with the American mathematician Akram Aldroubi, Michael Unser co-authored a book on the use of wavelets in medicine and biology.

- Aldroubi, A., Unser, M. (1996) Wavelets in Medicine and Biology. CRC Press. ISBN 0-8493-9483-X
- Unser, M., Tafti, P.D. (2014) An Introduction to Sparse Stochastic Processes. Cambridge University Press. ISBN 9781107415805
- McCann, M.T., Unser, M. (2019) Biomedical Image Reconstruction: From the Foundations to Deep Neural Networks. Now Publishers. ISBN 9781680836509
