= Gervais, Oregon =

- City
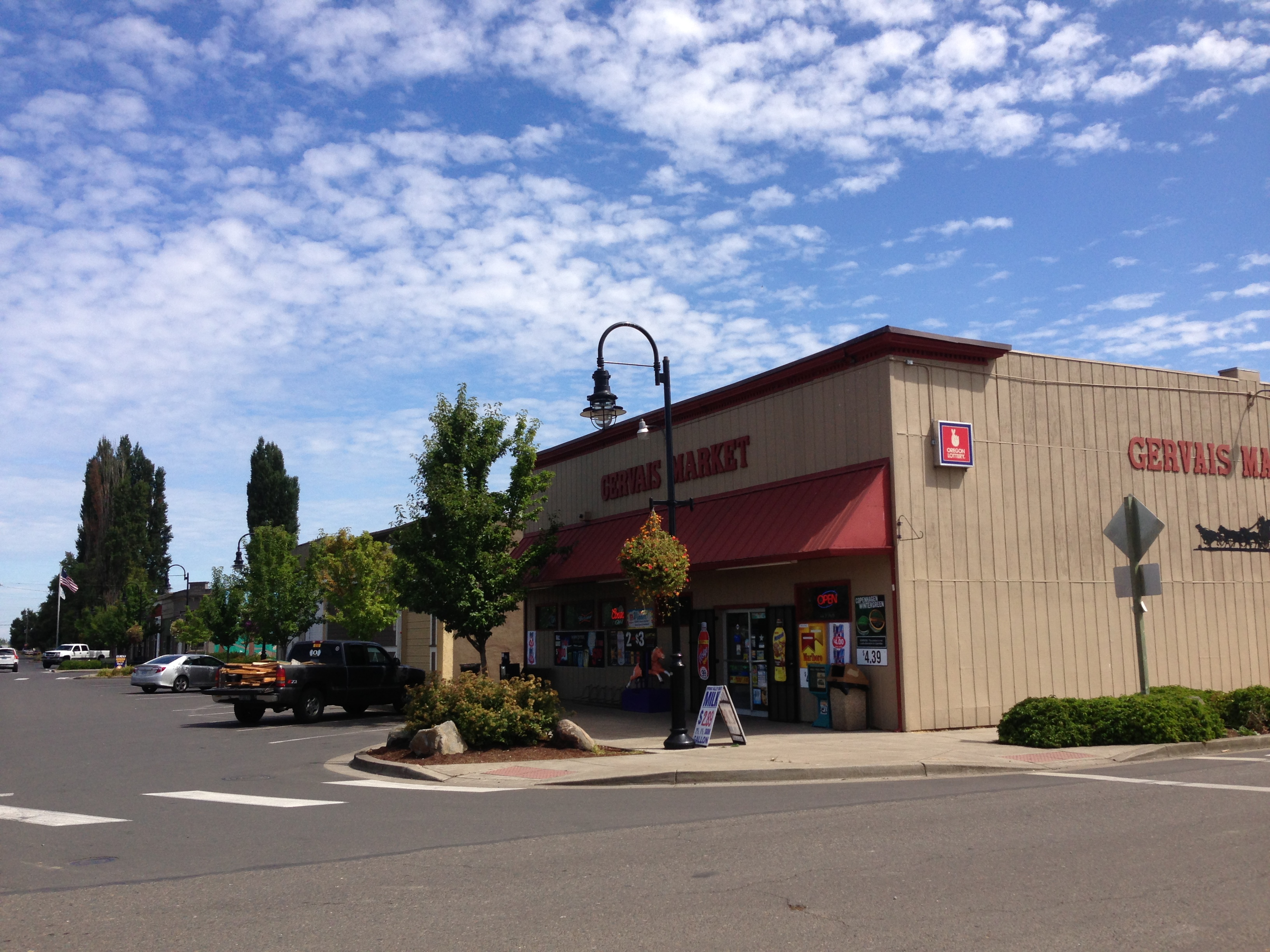
- Fourth Street in downtown Gervais

- Seal

- Location in Oregon
- Coordinates: 45°06′29″N 122°53′47″W
- Country: United States
- State: Oregon
- County: Marion
- Incorporated: 1874

Government
  - Mayor: Brian Wagner

Area
  - Total: 0.41 sq mi (1.06 km^{2})
  - Land: 0.41 sq mi (1.06 km^{2})
  - Water: 0 sq mi (0.00 km^{2})
- Elevation: 187 ft (57 m)

Population (2020)
  - Total: 2,595
  - Density: 6,368.5/sq mi (2,458.89/km^{2})
- Time zone: UTC-8 (Pacific)
  - Summer (DST): UTC-7 (Pacific)
- ZIP Code: 97026
- Area code: 503
- FIPS code: 41-28650
- GNIS feature ID: 2410585
- Website: www.gervaisoregon.org

Gervais /ˈdʒɜːrvɪs/ is a city in Marion County, United States. The population was 2,595 at the 2020 census. It is part of the Salem Metropolitan Statistical Area.

== History ==
The city is named for settler Joseph Gervais who was one of the first settlers on French Prairie.

On October 6, 1902, the business district of the city burned and losses were estimated at $100,000. The local fire department's power was insufficient to handle the fire so Portland and Salem were called upon to help. Unfortunately they were unable to respond in time to help. In little over an hour all but two of the businesses in the town had burned to the ground.

In the late 1960s, Russian Old Believers established a small colony between Gervais and Mt. Angel. As of 2002, Oregon had the highest population of Old Believers in the United States.

== Geography ==
Gervais is in northern Marion County, 3 miles (5 km) south of Woodburn and 14 miles (23 km) north of Salem, the state capital and county seat. Oregon Route 99E runs along the southeastern border of the city.

According to the U.S. Census Bureau, Gervais has a total area of 0.41 square miles (1.06 km^{2}), all land.

== Demographics ==
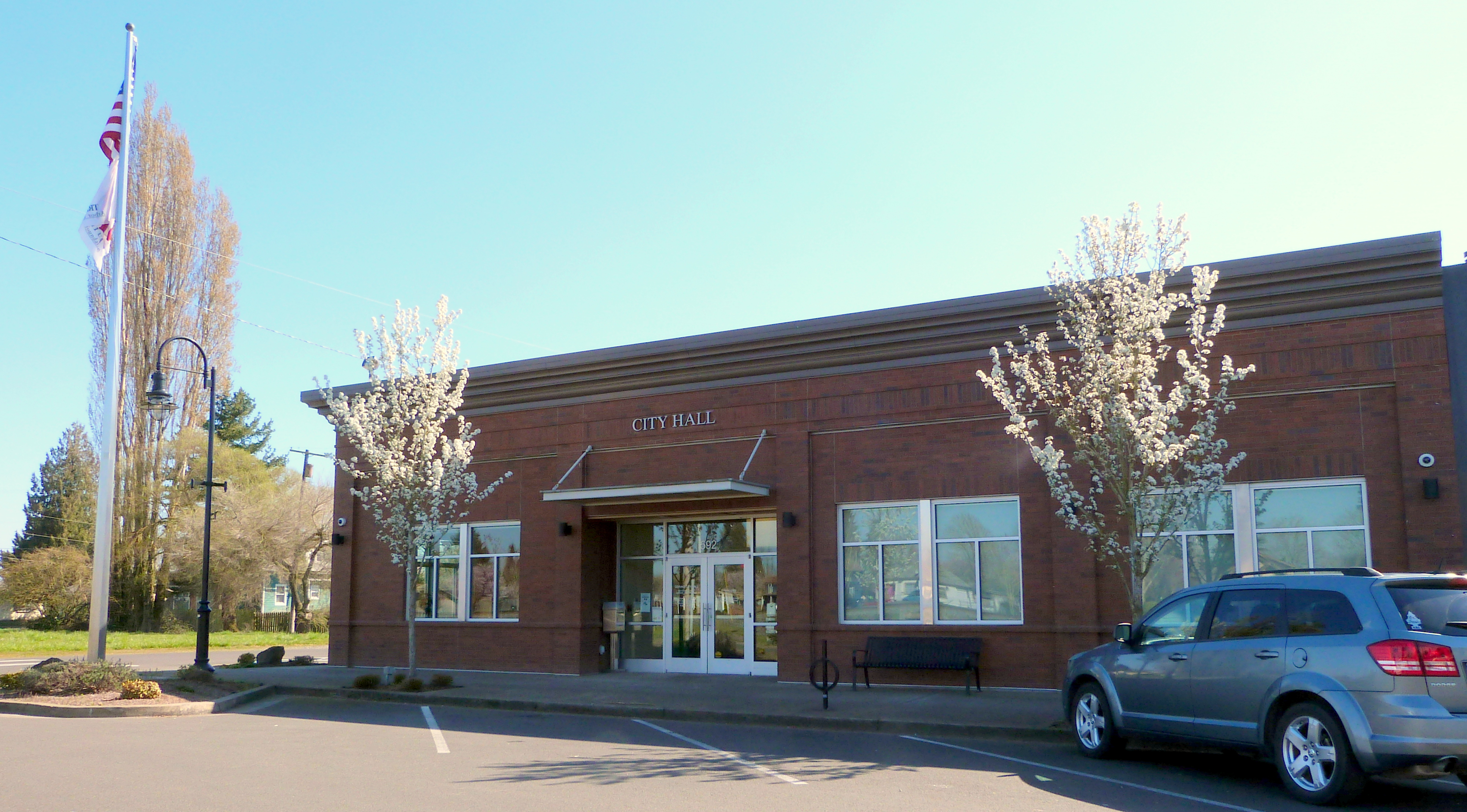
Gervais City Hall

Historical population
Census	Pop.	Note	%±
1880	202		—
1900	224		—
1910	276		23.2%
1920	268		−2.9%
1930	254		−5.2%
1940	332		30.7%
1950	457		37.7%
1960	438		−4.2%
1970	746		70.3%
1980	799		7.1%
1990	992		24.2%
2000	2,009		102.5%
2010	2,464		22.6%
2020	2,595		5.3%
2022 (est.)	3,047		17.4%
U.S. Decennial Census

=== 2020 census ===
As of the 2020 census, Gervais had a population of 2,595. The median age was 29.5 years. 30.7% of residents were under the age of 18 and 6.4% of residents were 65 years of age or older. For every 100 females there were 106.8 males, and for every 100 females age 18 and over there were 103.7 males age 18 and over.

0% of residents lived in urban areas, while 100.0% lived in rural areas.

There were 633 households in Gervais, of which 56.2% had children under the age of 18 living in them. Of all households, 61.5% were married-couple households, 13.6% were households with a male householder and no spouse or partner present, and 17.1% were households with a female householder and no spouse or partner present. About 7.4% of all households were made up of individuals and 2.4% had someone living alone who was 65 years of age or older.

There were 659 housing units, of which 3.9% were vacant. Among occupied housing units, 82.1% were owner-occupied and 17.9% were renter-occupied. The homeowner vacancy rate was 0.2% and the rental vacancy rate was 11.0%.

Racial composition as of the 2020 census
Race	Number	Percent
White	961	37.0%
Black or African American	17	0.7%
American Indian and Alaska Native	145	5.6%
Asian	28	1.1%
Native Hawaiian and Other Pacific Islander	1	<0.1%
Some other race	855	32.9%
Two or more races	588	22.7%
Hispanic or Latino (of any race)	1,735	66.9%

=== 2010 census ===
As of the census of 2010, there were 2,464 people, 579 households, and 506 families living in the city. The population density was 6,317.9 inhabitants per square mile (2,439.4/km^{2}). There were 628 housing units at an average density of 1,610.3 per square mile (621.7/km^{2}). The racial makeup of the city was 52.4% White, 0.6% African American, 3.7% Native American, 0.9% Asian, 38.0% from other races, and 4.5% from two or more races. Hispanic or Latino of any race were 67.1% of the population.

There were 579 households, of which 61.0% had children under the age of 18 living with them, 63.6% were married couples living together, 15.4% had a female householder with no husband present, 8.5% had a male householder with no wife present, and 12.6% were non-families. 7.8% of all households were made up of individuals, and 1.9% had someone living alone who was 65 years of age or older. The average household size was 4.25 and the average family size was 4.40.

The median age in the city was 26.3 years. 37.3% of residents were under the age of 18; 10.6% were between the ages of 18 and 24; 30.6% were from 25 to 44; 17.8% were from 45 to 64; and 3.7% were 65 years of age or older. The gender makeup of the city was 52.5% male and 47.5% female.

=== 2000 census ===
As of the census of 2000, there were 2,009 people, 452 households, and 391 families living in the city. The population density was 5,133.7 inhabitants per square mile (1,982.1/km^{2}). There were 477 housing units at an average density of 1,218.9 per square mile (470.6/km^{2}). The racial makeup of the city was 40.32% White, 0.35% African American, 1.54% Native American, 0.30% Asian, 0.05% Pacific Islander, 52.91% from other races, and 4.53% from two or more races. Hispanic or Latino of any race were 65.21% of the population.

There were 452 households, out of which 59.7% had children under the age of 18 living with them, 66.8% were married couples living together, 9.7% had a female householder with no husband present, and 13.3% were non-families. 9.5% of all households were made up of individuals, and 2.7% had someone living alone who was 65 years of age or older. The average household size was 4.39 and the average family size was 4.45.

In the city, the population was spread out, with 37.7% under the age of 18, 12.9% from 18 to 24, 34.0% from 25 to 44, 10.6% from 45 to 64, and 4.7% who were 65 years of age or older. The median age was 24 years. For every 100 females, there were 120.5 males. For every 100 females age 18 and over, there were 132.1 males.

The median income for a household in the city was $43,882, and the median income for a family was $44,118. Males had a median income of $21,490 versus $21,167 for females. The per capita income for the city was $10,862. About 13.3% of families and 17.3% of the population were below the poverty line, including 20.9% of those under age 18 and 11.0% of those age 65 or over.

== Notable people ==
- Samuel Brown, member of the Oregon Senate
- Sam H. Brown, member of the Oregon Senate, son of Samuel Brown
- Tracy Cramer, member of the Oregon House of Representatives for the 22nd district
- Freeman Fitzgerald, footballer who played for the Rock Island Independents, one of the founding teams of the NFL
- Joseph Gervais, pioneer who settled in Oregon Country, the namesake of the city
- Jules Eckert Goodman, playwright who adapted Robert Louis Stevenson's Treasure Island
- Teresa Alonso Leon, member of the Oregon House of Representatives for the 22nd district
- Peter G. Stewart, pioneer who settled in Oregon Country, served as city recorder for Gervais
