= Carlos Muñoz Pizarro =

Chilean botanist (1913–1976)

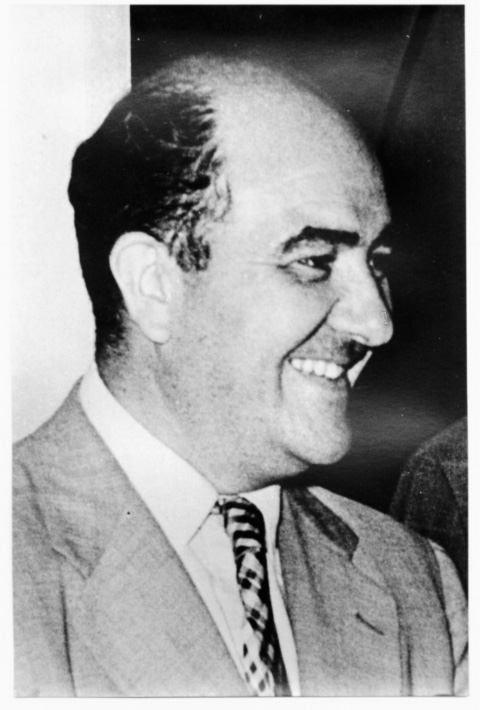
1913 - 1976

Carlos Muñoz Pizarro (September 25, 1913 – May 12, 1976) was a Chilean botanist born in the city of Coquimbo and deceased on May 12, 1976 in New York City. He was well known for his studies of the Chilean flora, its conservation and as university professor.

== Early life and study ==
He developed an interest in natural sciences while studying agronomy at the University of Chile, from which he graduated in 1937. During 1939 and 1940 he studied plant taxonomy in the United States of America (USA), first at Harvard University and later at the Smithsonian Institution in Washington. After his return to Chile, he returned to the USA in 1948 to study the Chilean plants kept in the Gray Herbarium of Harvard University.

== Teaching and advocacy ==
He was an active advocate of the conservation of renewable natural resources and the scenic beauty of Chile. As a university professor, he constantly encouraged the younger generations to join him in this endeavor. He promoted the creation of the first Forestry School at the University of Chile. He taught botany for almost 40 years in the Agronomy, Forestry, and Architecture Schools of the University of Chile.

== Expeditions ==
Many expeditions throughout Chile allowed him to become familiar with the flora of Chile and turned him into a tireless disseminator of its peculiarities. He promoted the creation of a Network of National Parks and Forest Reserves in Chile and was one of the first Chilean botanists to draw attention to the threatened and endangered condition of numerous endemic species of the Chilean vascular flora. He also actively participated in creating the National Botanical Garden in the Region of Valparaiso (Chile). His enthusiasm for taxonomic studies was crucial for the complete refurbishing of the National Herbarium located at the National Museum of Natural History in Santiago (Chile), which he accomplished along with a significant increase in the number of herbarium specimens, contributed by him or by others. With his wife, Ruth Schick Carrasco, he created a collection of phototypes of the Chilean specimens in foreign herbaria. His passion for plant taxonomy was so great that he named his daughters after three grass genera: Mélica, Nassella, and Aira.

== Offices and awards ==
He attended numerous conferences and scientific meetings. In 1940 he joined the Commission for the Protection of the Flora, Fauna, and Natural Scenic Beauty, which met in Washington (USA). That same year he was Vice President of the Biological Science Commission of the VIII American Scientific Congress held in the same city. In 1964 he was appointed Honorary Vice-Chairman of the X International Botanical Congress held in Edinburgh, Scotland. He was chairman of the Latin American Committee on National Parks (CLAPN) under the International Union for Conservation of Nature (IUCN) based in Switzerland. In 1967 it was incorporated as a Number Member of the Academy of Sciences of the Institute of Chile. Many honors were bestowed upon him, but most notably was his appointment, in 1974, as Knight in the Most Excellent Order of the Golden Ark by his Royal Highness Prince Bernhard of the Netherlands, for outstanding service in the cause of nature conservation.

== Notable publications ==
His extensive research generated a considerable number of publications, mostly in Spanish, including the "Bibliographic Index of Chilean Grasses (1941), "Synopsis of the Chilean Flora" (1959 and 1966), "Plant Species described by R.A. Philippi in the 19th Century" (1960), "Wild Flowers of Chile" (1966), and "Chile: Endangered Plants Species" (1973).

== Death ==
On May 12, 1976, while he was participating in the conference “Extinction is forever: threatened and endangered species of plants in the Americas and their significance in ecosystems today and in the future” at the New York Botanical Garden in commemoration of the Bicentennial of the United States of America, a heart attack ended his life at age 63.

== Miscellanea ==
He described 8 new species for the Chilean flora, and 4 plant species have been named in his honour: Valeriana munozii (by Olga Helena Borsini), Gamochaeta munnozii (by Ángel Lulio Cabrera), Senecio munnozii (by Cabrera), and Griselinia carlomunozii (by Michael Dillon & Melica Muñoz-Schick).

== Bibliography ==
- Muñoz P., Carlos. 1941. Índice bibliográfico de las gramíneas chilenas. Ministerio Agricultura, Departamento de Genética y Fitotécnica, Santiago de Chile. Boletín Técnico 2:1-88.
- Muñoz P., Carlos. 1959. Sinopsis de la flora chilena. Claves para la identificación de familias y géneros. Ediciones Universidad de Chile, Santiago de Chile, 840 págs, 238 lám. incluidas en el texto, 5 lám.
- Muñoz P., Carlos. 1966. Sinopsis de la flora chilena. Claves para la identificación de familias y géneros. Ediciones Universidad de Chile, Santiago de Chile, 2da edición, 500 págs., 243 lám. incl. en el texto, 4 lám.
- Muñoz P., Carlos. 1960. Las especies de plantas descritas por R.A. Philippi en el siglo XIX. Ediciones Universidad de Chile, Santiago de Chile, 189 págs.
- Muñoz P., Carlos. 1966. Flores silvestres de Chile. München. 245 págs., 51 lám.
- Muñoz P., Carlos. 1973. Chile: Plantas en extinción. Editorial Universitaria, 248 págs., 41 figs., y 31 lám. incl. en el texto.
- Borsini, O. 1944. Valerianaceae. En H. Descole (ed.) Genera et Species Plantarum Argentinarum 2: 275-372.
