= Arrate Muñoz Barrutia =

Spanish biomedical engineer

María Arrate Muñoz Barrutia (born 1973) is a Spanish biomedical engineer specializing in biomedical imaging and image processing. She is a professor of bioengineering, in the Biomedical Imaging and Instrumentation Group of Charles III University of Madrid.

== Education and career ==
Muñoz was born in 1973 in Pamplona. She earned a licenciate (equivalent of a combined bachelor's and master's degree) from the Public University of Navarre in 1997, including a thesis research project on the use of fiber Bragg gratings in spectrometers as an ERASMUS student at King's College London, working there with Vincent A. Handerek. She went to the École Polytechnique Fédérale de Lausanne in Switzerland for a Ph.D., completed in 2002. Her doctoral dissertation, Nondyadic and nonlinear multiresolution image approximations, was supervised by Michael Unser.

She became a postdoctoral researcher and Torres Quevedo fellow at the Centro de Estudios e Investigaciones Técnicas at the University of Navarra, from 2002 to 2005, also holding an adjunct faculty position in the university's engineering school. She continued at the University of Navarra, becoming an associate professor of biomedical engineering in 2011, until moving to her present position at Charles III University as an associate professor in 2014.

== Recognition ==
Muñoz was named an IEEE Fellow, in the 2024 class of fellows, "for contributions to biomedical image processing".
