= 29th Oregon Legislative Assembly =

←	28th Legislative Assembly	30th Legislative Assembly	→
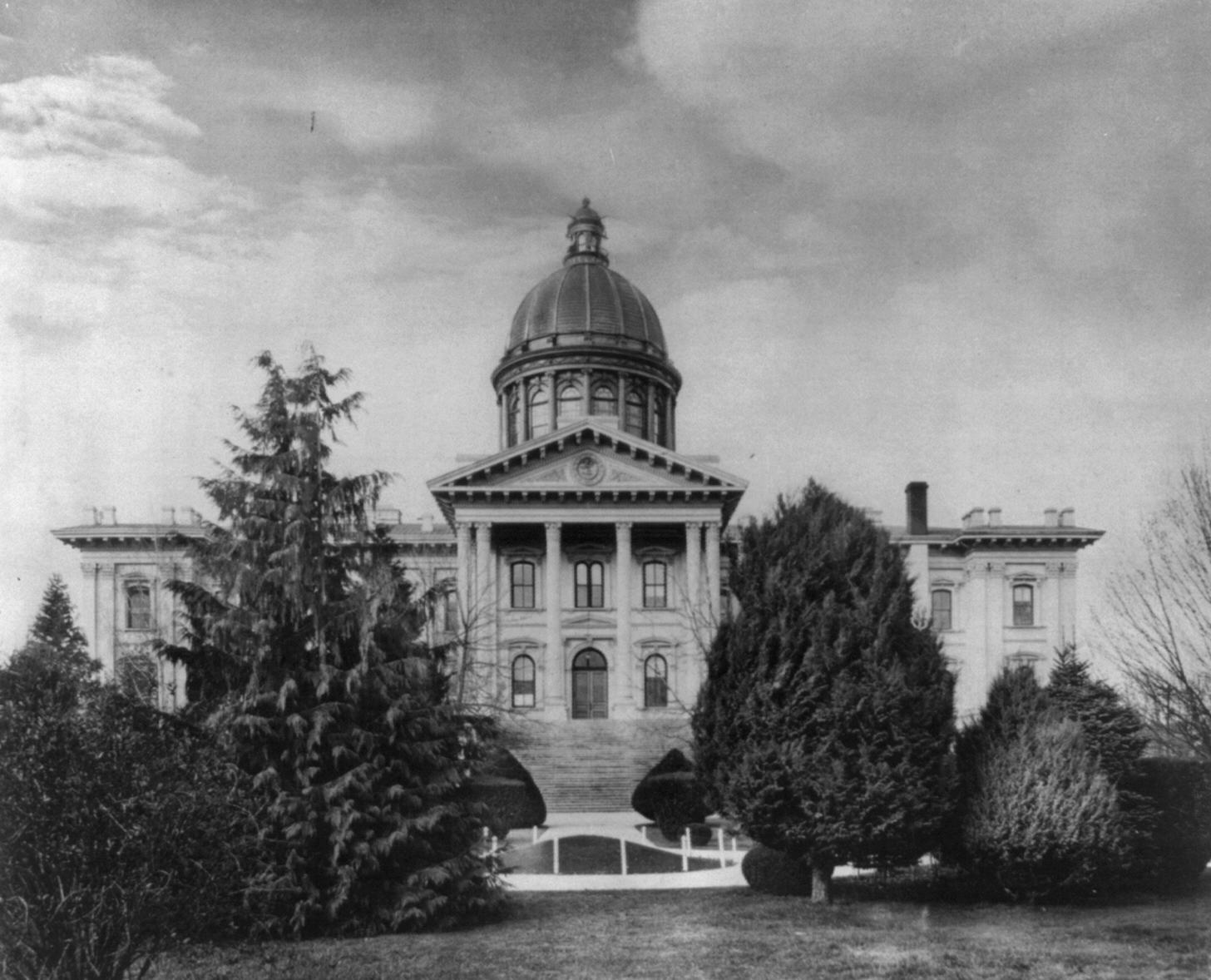
- The legislature took place in the second Oregon State Capitol, seen here in 1909

Overview
- Legislative body: Oregon Legislative Assembly
- Jurisdiction: Oregon, United States
- Meeting place: Oregon State Capitol
- Term: 1917
- Website: www.oregonlegislature.gov

Oregon State Senate
- Members: 30 Senators
- Senate President: Gus C. Moser (R)
- Party control: Republican Party of Oregon

Oregon House of Representatives
- Members: 59 Representatives
- Speaker of the House: R. N. Stanfield (R)
- Party control: Republican Party of Oregon

The 29th Oregon Legislative Assembly was the legislative session of the Oregon Legislative Assembly that convened on January 8, 1917 and adjourned February 19, 1917. During the session, Senator George R. Wilbur (D-Hood River) introduced Senate Bill 61, which would have banned Japanese-born individuals from buying land. It failed after the Portland Chamber of Commerce and U.S. State Department opposed it due to potential negative economic and diplomatic consequences with Japan.

== Senate ==
Affiliation	Members
Democratic	5
Republican	24
Independent	1
Total	30

=== Senate members ===
Composition of the Senate
Senator	Residence	Party
George T. Baldwin	Klamath Falls	Democratic
C. A. Barrett	Athena	Republican
Isaac H. Bingham	Eugene	Republican
Charles Pleasant Bishop	Salem	Republican
E. D. Cusick	Albany	Republican
Walter A. Dimick	Oregon City	Republican
B. L. Eddy	Roseburg	Republican
Robert S. Farrell	Portland	Republican
Samuel M. Garland	Lebanon	Democratic
John Gill	Portland	Republican
T. B. Handley	Tillamook	Republican
C. L. Hawley	McCoy	Republican
Julien A. Hurley	Vale	Republican
S. B. Huston	Portland	Republican
A. M. LaFollett	Gervais	Republican
C. A. Leinenweber	Astoria	Republican
Hermon A. Lewis	Portland	Independent
Gus C. Moser	Portland	Republican
Conrad P. Olson	Portland	Republican
A. W. Orton	Portland	Republican
Walter M. Pierce	LaGrande	Democratic
M. D. Shanks	Condon	Republican
I. S. Smith	Marshfield	Republican
J. C. Smith	Grants Pass	Republican
Frederick Steiwer	Pendleton	Republican
W. H. Strayer	Baker	Democratic
W. T. Vinton	McMinnville	Republican
H. Von der Hellen	Wellen	Republican
George R. Wilbur	Hood River	Democratic
W. D. Wood	Hillsboro	Republican

== House ==
Affiliation	Members
Democratic	4
Republican	54
Independent	1
Total	59

There are only 59 members listed on the official roll call for the session; there are usually 60.

=== House members ===
Composition of the House of Representatives
Representative	Residence	Party
J. E. Anderson	The Dalles	Republican
Fred S. Ashley	Enterprise	Republican
Ira C. Barber	Willamina	Republican
Louis E. Bean	Eugene	Republican
L. O. Belland	Astoria	Republican
Benton Bowman	Hillsboro	Republican
Charles A. Brand	Wilbur	Republican
Sam H. Brown	Gervais	Republican
George C. Brownell	Oregon City	Republican
Denton G. Burdick	Redmond	Republican
A. H. Burton	Portland	Republican
A. C. Callan	Portland	Republican
D. M. Cartmill	Haines	Republican
Charles Childs	Brownsville	Republican
Clay C. Clark	Arlington	Republican
Hamilton F. Corbett	Portland	Republican
B. P. Cornelius	Hillsboro	Republican
Charles M. Crandall	Vale	Republican
H. A. Dedman	Canby	Republican
Allen H. Eaton	Eugene	Republican
Charles F. Elgin	Salem	Republican
W. P. Elmore	Brownsville	Democratic
Vernon A. Forbes	Bend	Republican
W. V. Fuller	Dallas	Republican
E. J. Goode	Portland	Republican
Herbert Gordon	Portland	Republican
William H. Gore	Medford	Republican
Roy Griggs	Comstock	Republican
Lou Hodgen	Umapine	Independent
Seymour Jones	Salem	Republican
W. Al Jones	Salem	Republican
Kaspar K. Kubli	Portland	Republican
W. P. Lafferty	Corvallis	Republican
O. Laurgaard	Portland	Republican
D. C. Lewis	Portland	Republican
William W. Lunger	La Fayette	Republican
Lionel C. Mackay	Portland	Republican
John M. Mann	Portland	Republican
Ivan G. Martin	Salem	Republican
Stephen A. Matthieu	Portland	Republican
S. A. D. Meek	North Plains	Republican
Albert W. Mueller	St. Helens	Republican
Arthur K. Peck	Marshfield	Republican
F. H. Porter	Halsey	Republican
C. O. Portwood	Fossil	Republican
Roy W. Ritner	Pendleton	Republican
Frank A. Rowe	Wheeler	Republican
William E. Schimpff	Astoria	Republican
Benjamin C. Shelton	Medford	Republican
Charles A. Small	La Grande	Republican
Conrad Stafrin	Dallas	Republican
R. N. Stanfield	Stanfield	Republican
Harold C. Stephens	George	Republican
Plowden Stott	Portland	Republican
Charles T. Sweeney	Murphy	Democratic
C. M. Thomas	Medford	Republican
Sylvia McGuire Thompson	The Dalles	Democratic
Frank B. Tichenor	Port Orford	Democratic
George T. Willett	Portland	Republican
