= 30th Oregon Legislative Assembly =

←	29th Legislative Assembly	31st Legislative Assembly	→
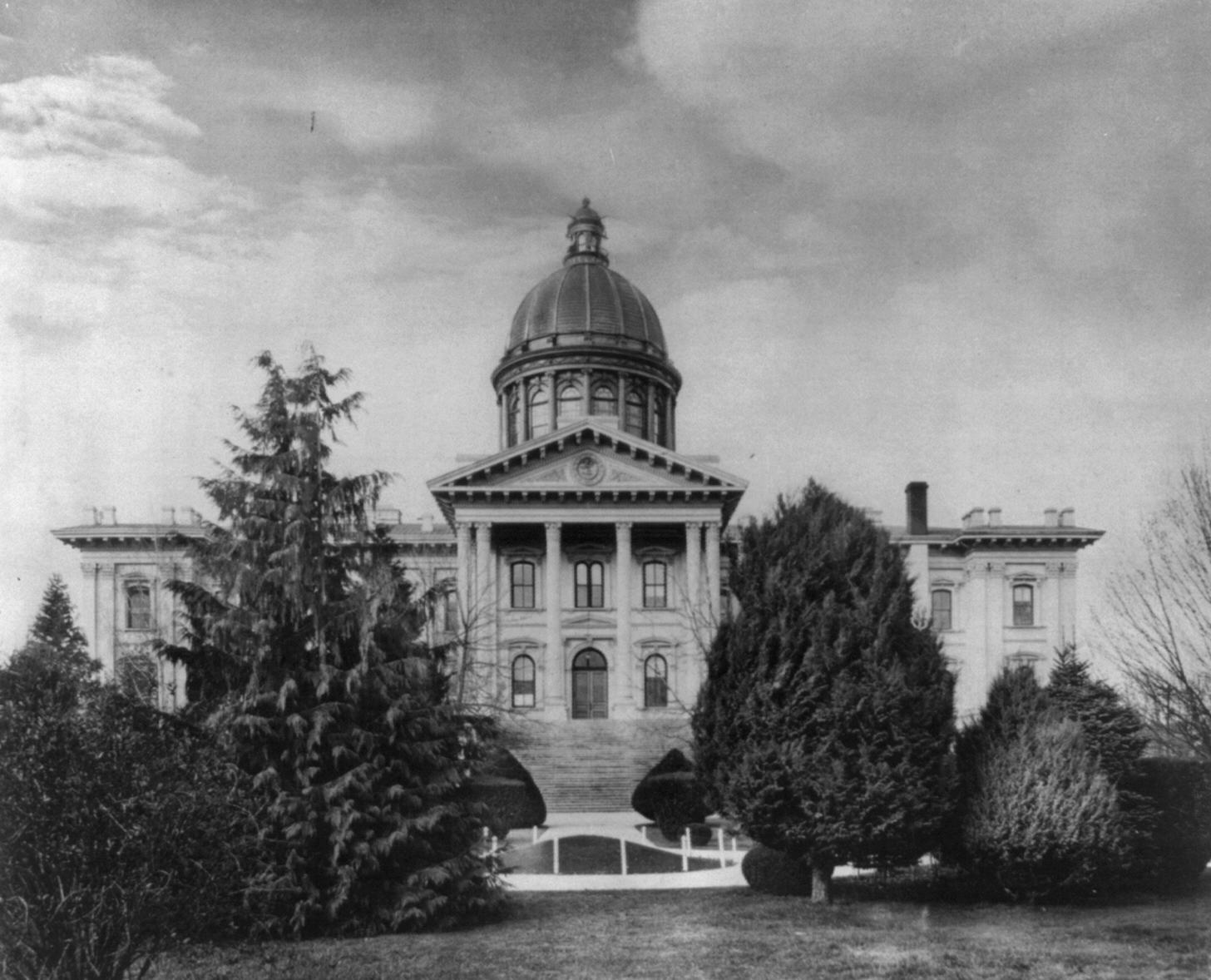
- The legislature took place in the second Oregon State Capitol, seen here in 1909

Overview
- Legislative body: Oregon Legislative Assembly
- Jurisdiction: Oregon, United States
- Meeting place: Oregon State Capitol
- Term: 1919
- Website: www.oregonlegislature.gov

Oregon State Senate
- Members: 30 Senators
- Senate President: William T. Vinton (R)
- Party control: Republican Party of Oregon

Oregon House of Representatives
- Members: 60 Representatives
- Speaker of the House: Seymour Jones (R)
- Party control: Republican Party of Oregon

The 30th Oregon Legislative Assembly was the legislative session of the Oregon Legislative Assembly that convened on January 13, 1919 and adjourned February 27, 1919. There was a special session held from January 12 to January 17, 1920.

== Senate ==
Affiliation	Members
Democratic	3
Republican	24
Independent	3
Total	30

=== Senate members ===
Composition of the Senate
Senator	Residence	Party
George T. Baldwin	Klamath Falls	Democratic
William W. Banks	Portland	Republican
John B. Bell	Eugene	Republican
Walter A. Dimick	Oregon City	Republican
Colon R. Eberhard	LaGrande	Republican
B. L. Eddy	Roseburg	Republican
Robert S. Farrell	Portland	Republican
John Gil	Portland	Republican
T. B. Handley	Tillamook	Republican
F. C. Howell	Portland	Republican
Julien A. Hurley	Vale	Republican
Samuel B. Huston	Portland	Republican
Walter H. Jones	Eugene	Independent
Louis Lachmund	Salem	Republican
Alex M. LaFollett	Gervais	Independent
Gus C. Moser	Portland	Republican
John R. Nickelsen	Hood River	Independent
Albin Walter Norblad Sr.	Astoria	Republican
A. W. Orton	Portland	Republican
Isaac Lee Patterson	Salem	Republican
Walter M. Pierce	LaGrande	Democratic
F. H. Porter	Halsey	Republican
Roy W. Ritner	Pendleton	Republican
Marion D. Shanks	Condon	Republican
Ira S. Smith	Marshfield	Republican
Dr. J. C. Smith	Grants Pass	Republican
W. H. Strayer	Baker	Democratic
C. M. Thomas	Medford	Republican
W. T. Vinton	McMinnville	Republican
Dr. W. D. Wood	Hillsboro	Republican

== House ==
Affiliation	Members
Democratic	6
Republican	54
Total	60

=== House members ===
Composition of the House of Representatives
Representative	Residence	Party
E. I. Ballagh	St. Helens	Republican
Louis E. Bean	Eugene	Republican
W. C. Bolton	Friend	Republican
Charles A. Brand	Roseburg	Republican
Cyril G. Brownell	Umatilla	Republican
Denton G. Burdick	Redmond	Republican
S. L. Burnaugh	Enterprise	Democratic
Charles Childs	Brownsville	Republican
John B. Coffey	Portland	Republican
J. M. Crawford	Dundee	Republican
Harvey E. Cross	Oregon City	Republican
Henry A. Dedman	Canby	Republican
W. B. Dennis	Carlton	Republican
E. P. Dodd	Hermiston	Republican
C. J. Edwards	Tillamook	Republican
W. P. Elmore	Brownsville	Democratic
W. V. Fuller	Dallas	Republican
P. J. Gallagher	Ontario	Republican
Herbert Gordon	Portland	Republican
W. H. Gore	Medford	Republican
David M. Graham	Eugene	Republican
Loyal M. Graham	Forest Grove	Republican
Roy Griggs	Comstock	Republican
E. W. Haines	Hillsboro	Republican
William G. Hare	Hillsboro	Republican
Oscar W. Horne	Portland	Republican
O. W. Hosford	Portland	Republican
S. A. Hughes	Salem	Republican
A. R. Hunter	Island City	Democratic
E. N. Hurd	Seaside	Republican
H. L. Idleman	Portland	Republican
B. F. Jones	Newport	Republican
Seymour Jones	Salem	Republican
Kaspar K. Kubli	Portland	Republican
W. P. Lafferty	Corvallis	Republican
D. C. Lewis	Portland	Republican
David E. Lofgren	Portland	Republican
David H. Looney	Jefferson	Republican
Ivan G. Martin	Salem	Republican
E. C. McFarland	Portland	Republican
George H. Merryman	Klamath Falls	Republican
Chester Moore	Portland	Republican
Oren R. Richards	Portland	Republican
Joseph G. Richardson	Portland	Republican
J. E. Roman	Astoria	Republican
C. Schuebel	Oregon City	Republican
Benjamin C. Sheldon	Medford	Republican
C. A. Sidler	Grants Pass	Republican
A. A. Smith	Baker	Democratic
Eugene E. Smith	Portland	Republican
J. R. Stannard (Note: J. R. Stannard died after his election and right before the convening of the 1919 regular session, so his name shows up on roll call documents.)	Gold Beach	Republican
James S. Stewart	Fossil	Republican
Sylvia McGuire Thompson	The Dalles	Democratic
D. C. Thoms	Scio	Republican
T. J. Thrift	Coquille	Democratic
George W. Weeks	Salem	Republican
J. A. Westerlund	Medford	Republican
H. C. Wheeler	Pleasant Hill	Republican
C. E. Woodson	Heppner	Republican
A. M. Wright	Morrow	Republican
