= 1926 Oregon gubernatorial election =

- November 2, 1926
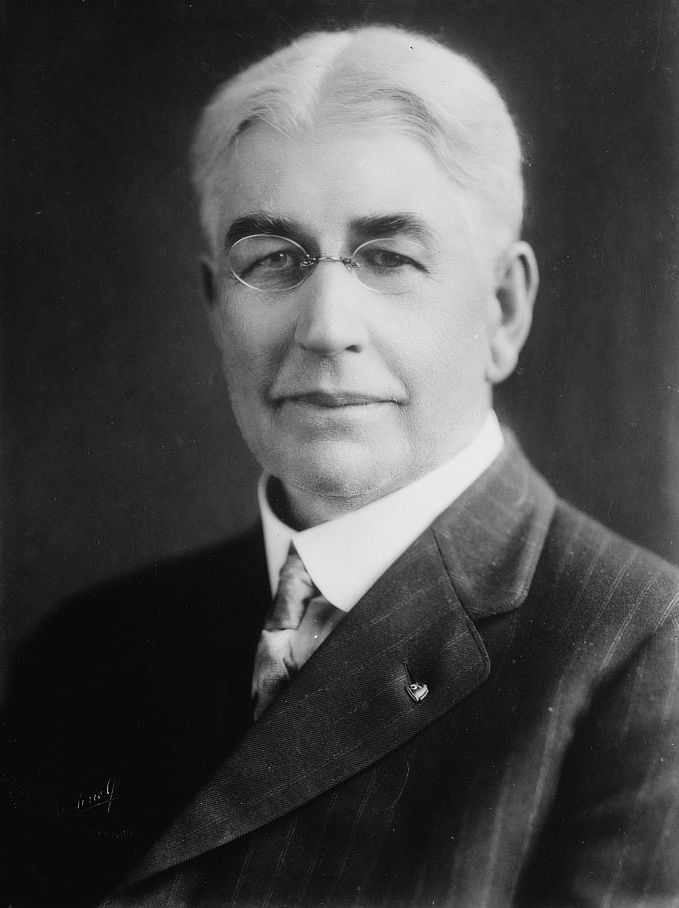

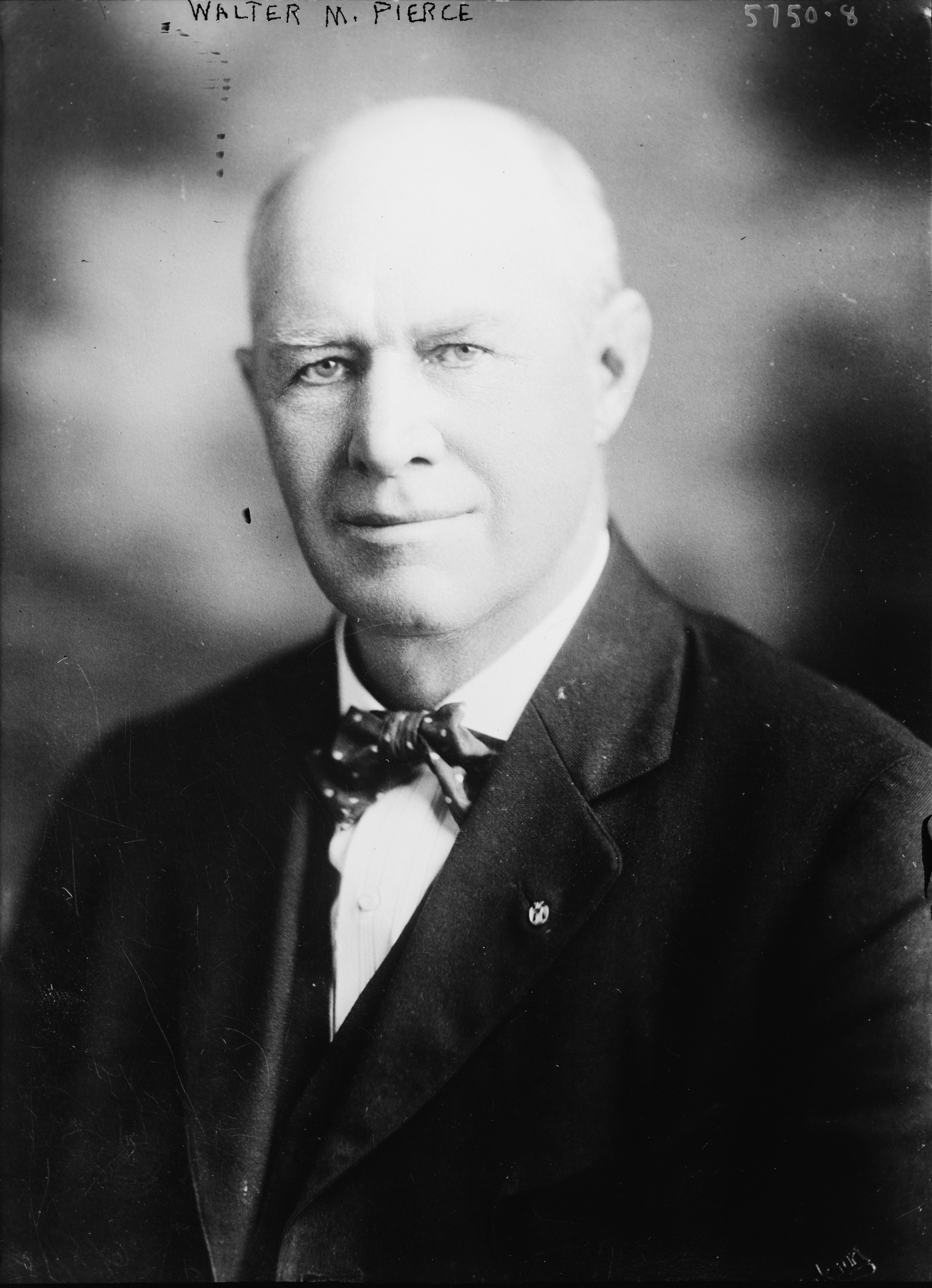

Nominee	I. L. Patterson	Walter M. Pierce	H. H. Stallard
Party	Republican	Democratic	Independent
Popular vote	120,073	93,470	12,402
Percentage	53.14%	41.37%	5.49%
- County results: Patterson: 40–50% 50–60% 60–70% Pierce: 40–50% 50–60% 60–70%
Governor before election
Walter M. Pierce
Democratic
Elected Governor
I. L. Patterson
Republican

The 1926 Oregon gubernatorial election took place on November 2, 1926, to elect the governor of the U.S. state of Oregon. The election matched incumbent Democrat Walter M. Pierce against Republican Isaac L. Patterson and Independent candidate H. H. Stallard, who ran on an anti-Prohibition platform. Patterson won by a wide margin.

== Primary election ==
Oregon held primary elections on May 21, 1926.

=== Democratic party ===
During a period of time in which Republicans had dominated politics in Oregon, Democrat Walter M. Pierce had won election in 1922 with the support of the Ku Klux Klan, which was for a short time a powerful political force in Oregon. However, soon after the 1922 election, the Klan faded in power due in part to internal struggles and changing public sentiment. Now running for re-election in 1926, Pierce faced opposition for his steadfast support of Prohibition. Challenging Pierce for the Democratic nomination was political activist Louise Palmer Weber, one of many anti-Prohibition candidates that year who ran on a platform of repealing or modifying laws regarding the regulation of alcoholic beverages in Oregon, who had previously supported Pierce in his 1918 campaign. Pierce ultimately easily won his party's primary for re-election in 1926 over Weber.

==== Candidates ====
- Walter M. Pierce, incumbent governor
- Louise Palmer Weber, activist

==== Results ====
Democratic primary results
Party	Candidate	Votes	%
Democratic	Walter M. Pierce (inc.)	24,310	71.84%
Democratic	Louise Palmer Weber	9,528	28.16%
Total votes		33,838	100.00%

=== Republican party ===
In their primary, Republicans nominated former state senator I. L. Patterson, who had chaired Calvin Coolidge's successful election campaign in Oregon, over Jay H. Upton and W. A. Carter.

==== Candidates ====
- W. A. Carter, attorney and former member of Oregon House of Representatives
- I. L. Patterson, former member of Oregon State Senate
- Jay H. Upton, member of Oregon State Senate

==== Results ====
Republican primary results
Party	Candidate	Votes	%
Republican	I. L. Patterson	62,772	51.15%
Republican	Jay H. Upton	38,773	31.60%
Republican	W. A. Carter	21,166	17.25%
Total votes		122,711	100.00%

== General election ==
=== Candidates ===
- Walter M. Pierce, Democratic
- I. L. Patterson, Republican
- H. H. Stallard, Independent

=== Results ===
1926 Oregon gubernatorial election
Party	Candidate	Votes	%	±%
Republican	I. L. Patterson	120,073	53.14%	+10.50%
Democratic	Walter M. Pierce (inc.)	93,470	41.37%	−15.99%
Independent	H. H. Stallard	12,402	5.49%	
Total votes		225,945	100.00%	
Majority		26,603	11.77%	
Republican gain from Democratic		Swing	+26.49%	

=== Results by county ===
Polk County failed to back the winning candidate for the first time since 1874. Hood River County and Wheeler County voted Democratic for the first time in a gubernatorial election; the latter would not vote Democratic again until 1970. Additionally, after this election, Crook County would not vote Democratic again until 1974.

County	I. L. Patterson Republican		Walter M. Pierce Democratic		H. H. Stallard Independent		Margin		Total votes cast
County	#	%	#	%	#	%	#	%	Total votes cast
Baker	2,361	41.35%	2,925	51.23%	424	7.43%	-564	-9.88%	5,710
Benton	2,376	55.35%	1,843	42.93%	74	1.72%	533	12.42%	4,293
Clackamas	5,389	47.72%	5,078	44.96%	827	7.32%	311	2.75%	11,294
Clatsop	3,329	64.42%	1,502	29.06%	337	6.52%	1,827	35.35%	5,168
Columbia	1,950	55.10%	1,383	39.08%	206	5.82%	567	16.02%	3,539
Coos	3,051	45.85%	2,877	43.24%	726	10.91%	174	2.61%	6,654
Crook	460	44.88%	534	52.10%	31	3.02%	-74	-7.22%	1,025
Curry	368	40.48%	474	52.15%	67	7.37%	-106	-11.66%	909
Deschutes	1,992	55.83%	1,394	39.07%	182	5.10%	598	16.76%	3,568
Douglas	3,218	51.42%	2,726	43.56%	314	5.02%	492	7.86%	6,258
Gilliam	528	46.89%	567	50.36%	31	2.72%	-39	-3.46%	1,126
Grant	856	50.12%	743	43.50%	109	6.38%	113	6.62%	1,708
Harney	562	39.08%	722	50.21%	154	10.71%	-160	-11.13%	1,438
Hood River	898	48.57%	912	49.32%	39	2.11%	-14	-0.76%	1,849
Jackson	3,952	50.08%	3,583	45.40%	357	4.52%	369	4.68%	7,892
Jefferson	325	53.37%	249	40.89%	35	5.75%	76	12.48%	609
Josephine	1,275	47.50%	1,282	47.76%	127	4.73%	-7	-0.26%	2,684
Klamath	3,340	65.45%	1,533	30.04%	230	4.51%	1,807	35.41%	5,103
Lake	777	53.18%	601	71.14%	83	5.68%	176	12.05%	1,461
Lane	6,394	56.71%	4,378	38.83%	502	4.45%	2,016	17.88%	11,274
Lincoln	1,547	54.88%	1,036	36.75%	236	8.37%	511	18.13%	2,819
Linn	3,366	47.87%	3,386	48.16%	279	3.97%	-20	-0.28%	7,031
Malheur	939	40.08%	1,264	53.95%	140	5.98%	-325	-13.87%	2,343
Marion	6,603	48.23%	5,870	42.88%	1,217	8.89%	733	5.35%	13,690
Morrow	649	47.97%	651	48.12%	53	3.92%	-2	-0.15%	1,353
Multnomah	45,381	60.36%	26,008	34.59%	3,793	5.05%	19,373	25.77%	75,182
Polk	2,075	47.64%	2,107	48.37%	174	3.99%	-32	-0.73%	4,356
Sherman	431	44.90%	508	52.92%	21	2.19%	-77	-8.02%	960
Tillamook	1,947	52.58%	1,544	41.70%	212	5.73%	403	10.88%	3,703
Umatilla	2,792	40.24%	3,917	56.45%	230	3.31%	-1,125	-16.21%	6,939
Union	1,378	29.38%	3,161	67.40%	151	3.22%	-1,783	-38.02%	4,690
Wallowa	818	41.38%	1,063	53.77%	96	4.86%	-245	-12.39%	1,977
Wasco	1,838	51.03%	1,579	43.84%	185	5.14%	259	7.19%	3,602
Washington	3,263	49.08%	2,957	44.47%	429	6.45%	306	4.60%	6,649
Wheeler	443	46.68%	467	49.21%	39	4.11%	-24	-2.53%	949
Yamhill	3,202	52.15%	2,646	43.09%	292	4.76%	556	9.06%	6,140
Total	120,073	53.14%	93,470	41.37%	12,402	5.49%	26,603	11.77%	225,945

==== Counties that flipped from Democratic to Republican ====
- Clackamas
- Clatsop
- Columbia
- Coos
- Deschutes
- Douglas
- Grant
- Jackson
- Jefferson
- Lane
- Lincoln
- Marion
- Multnomah
- Tillamook
- Wasco
- Washington
- Yamhill

==== Counties that flipped from Republican to Democratic ====
- Curry
- Gilliam
- Hood River
- Malheur
- Wheeler

== Aftermath ==
Patterson served about three years of his term before dying of pneumonia on December 22, 1929. Pierce was later elected to the United States House of Representatives, and represented Oregon's 2nd congressional district from 1933 to 1942.
