= 1922 Oregon gubernatorial election =

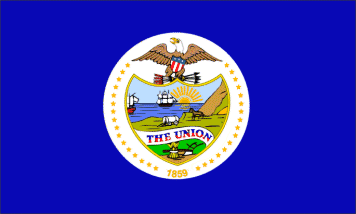
- November 7, 1922
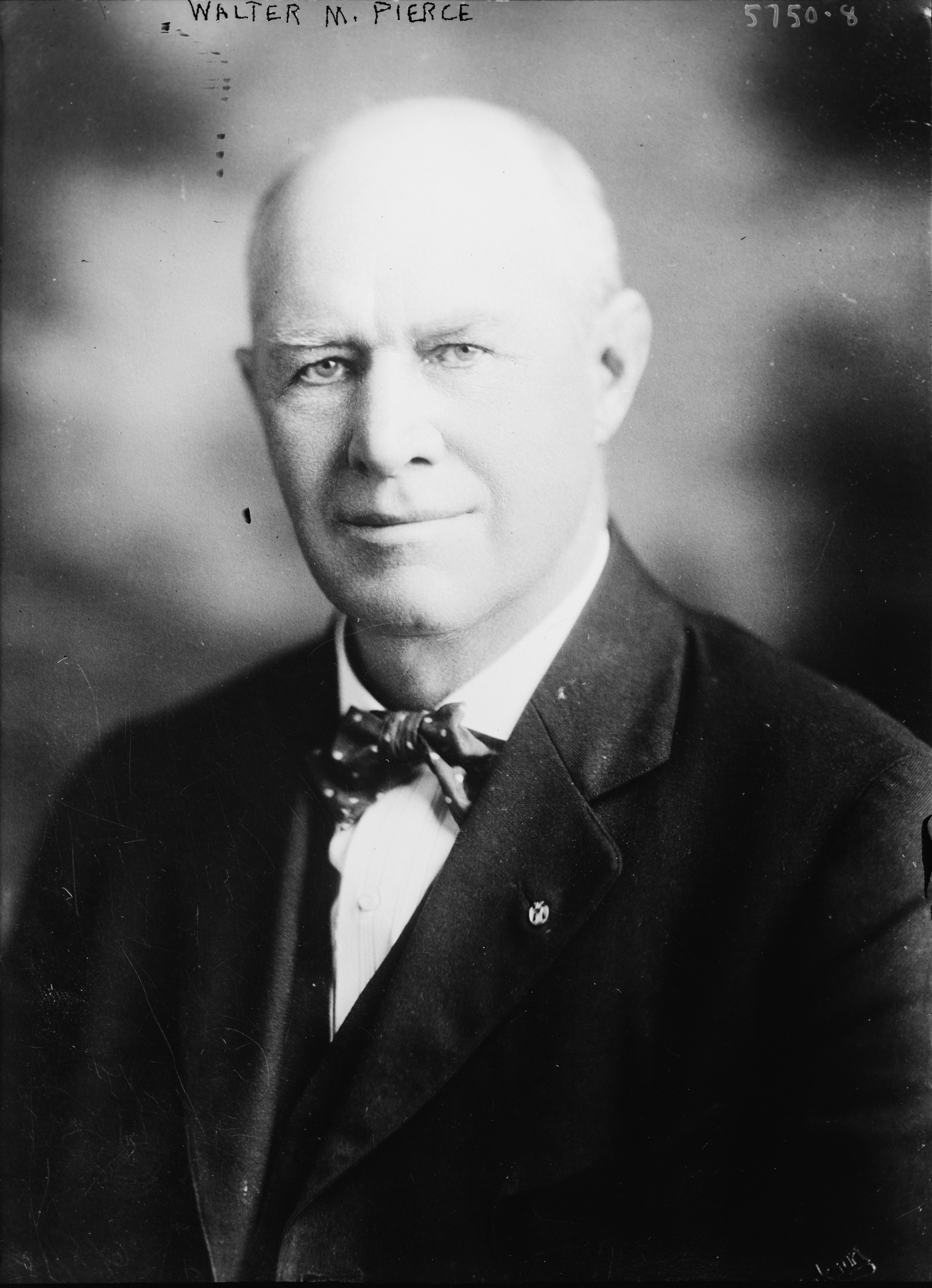

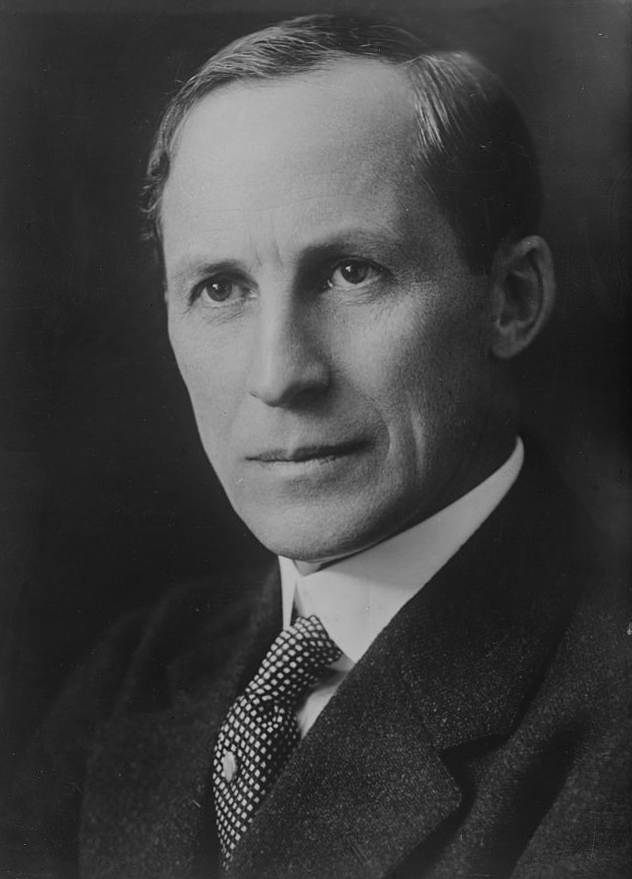
Nominee	Walter M. Pierce	Ben W. Olcott
Party	Democratic	Republican
Popular vote	133,392	99,164
Percentage	57.36%	42.64%
- County results Pierce: 50–60% 60–70% 70–80% Olcott: 50–60% 60–70%
Governor before election
Ben W. Olcott
Republican
Elected Governor
Walter M. Pierce
Democratic

The 1922 Oregon gubernatorial election took place on November 7, 1922, to elect the governor of the U.S. state of Oregon. The election matched incumbent Republican Ben W. Olcott against Democrat Walter M. Pierce. With the support of the Ku Klux Klan, then a powerful political force in the state, Pierce won the election by a wide margin.

== Primary election ==
Oregon held primary elections on May 19, 1922.

=== Republican party ===
In March 1919, Oregon governor James Withycombe died in office, just two months into his second term. As prescribed by Oregon law, Oregon Secretary of State Ben Olcott succeeded Withycombe in office. In 1922, Olcott announced that he would seek a full term in office.

In the early 1920s, the Ku Klux Klan had become a powerful political force in Oregon. Olcott refused to endorse the Klan, and shortly before the Republican primary, issued an executive proclamation against the organization for terrorist acts conducted by its members which included mock hangings. Olcott's actions nearly cost him the Republican nomination to the Klan-backed candidate, state senator Charles Hall. Olcott ultimately won a narrow victory in the primary but would face a general election campaign without the Klan's support.

==== Candidates ====
- Louis E. Bean, Speaker of the Oregon House of Representatives
- Charles Hall, member of Oregon State Senate
- J. D. Lee, former member of Oregon House of Representatives
- Ben W. Olcott, incumbent governor
- I. L. Patterson, member of Oregon State Senate
- George A. White, journalist and military officer

==== Results ====
Republican primary results
Party	Candidate	Votes	%
Republican	Ben W. Olcott (inc.)	43,032	37.53%
Republican	Charles Hall	42,511	37.08%
Republican	I. L. Patterson	13,019	11.36%
Republican	George A. White	10,156	8.86%
Republican	Louis E. Bean	3,870	3.38%
Republican	J. D. Lee	2,066	1.80%
Total votes		114,654	100.00%

=== Democratic party ===
In a rematch of the 1918 gubernatorial primary, Walter M. Pierce again defeated Harvey G. Starkweather to secure the Democratic nomination.

==== Candidates ====
- Webster Holmes, attorney and judge from Tillamook
- Walter M. Pierce, former member of Oregon State Senate and Democratic nominee for governor in 1918
- Will E. Purdy, independent candidate for governor in 1914
- Harvey G. Starkweather, former superintendent of schools in Clackmas County and La Grande

==== Results ====
Democratic primary results
Party	Candidate	Votes	%
Democratic	Walter M. Pierce	15,144	61.25%
Democratic	Harvey G. Starkweather	6,325	25.58%
Democratic	Webster Holmes	1,995	8.07%
Democratic	Will E. Purdy	1,261	5.10%
Total votes		24,725	100.00%

== General election ==
=== Campaign ===
With their original candidate's defeat, the Klan threw their support behind Democratic candidate Walter M. Pierce, who also agreed to back the Klan's Compulsory Education Act, which would require all students to attend public, rather than private schools, a deliberate attack on Roman Catholic private schools. Both Pierce and the education initiative won wide, but short-lived victories in November: the education law was struck down by the United States Supreme Court in their 1925 Pierce v. Society of Sisters decision, and Pierce lost re-election in 1926.

=== Results ===
1922 Oregon gubernatorial election
Party	Candidate	Votes	%	±%
Democratic	Walter M. Pierce	133,392	57.36%	+14.58%
Republican	Ben W. Olcott (inc.)	99,164	42.64%	−10.35%
Total votes		232,556	100.00%	
Majority		34,228	14.72%	
Democratic gain from Republican		Swing	+24.93%	

=== Results by county ===
Pierce was the first Democrat since E. M. Barnum in 1858 to carry Washington County in a gubernatorial election. That county, along with Marion County and Yamhill County would not vote Democratic again until 1974 while Grant County would not do the same again until 1970. Additionally Columbia County voted Democratic for the first time since 1886.

County	Walter M. Pierce Democratic		Ben W. Olcott Republican		Margin		Total votes cast
County	#	%	#	%	#	%	Total votes cast
Baker	3,180	65.89%	1,646	34.11%	1,534	31.79%	4,826
Benton	2,233	46.59%	2,560	53.41%	-327	-6.82%	4,793
Clackamas	7,114	61.51%	4,451	38.49%	2,663	23.03%	11,565
Clatsop	3,019	51.09%	2,890	48.91%	129	2.18%	5,909
Columbia	1,697	52.34%	1,545	47.66%	152	4.69%	3,242
Coos	3,846	61.71%	2,386	38.29%	1,460	23.43%	6,232
Crook	532	53.09%	470	46.91%	62	6.19%	1,002
Curry	351	42.70%	471	57.30%	-120	-14.60%	822
Deschutes	1,563	54.73%	1,293	45.27%	270	9.45%	2,856
Douglas	4,522	63.02%	2,654	36.98%	1,868	26.03%	7,176
Gilliam	478	43.89%	611	56.11%	-133	-12.21%	1,089
Grant	732	50.31%	723	49.69%	9	0.62%	1,455
Harney	564	57.55%	416	42.45%	148	15.10%	980
Hood River	926	47.78%	1,012	52.22%	-86	-4.44%	1,938
Jackson	4,670	58.37%	3,331	41.63%	1,339	16.74%	8,001
Jefferson	360	50.85%	348	49.15%	12	1.69%	708
Josephine	1,841	66.99%	907	33.01%	934	33.99%	2,748
Klamath	1,212	36.76%	2,085	63.24%	-873	-26.48%	3,297
Lake	479	33.29%	960	66.71%	-481	-33.43%	1,439
Lane	8,687	67.24%	4,233	32.76%	4,454	34.47%	12,920
Lincoln	999	51.42%	944	48.58%	55	2.83%	1,943
Linn	5,045	63.40%	2,913	36.60%	2,132	26.79%	7,958
Malheur	1,141	46.05%	1,337	53.95%	-196	-7.91%	2,478
Marion	8,522	56.64%	6,525	43.36%	1,997	13.27%	15,047
Morrow	729	51.45%	688	48.55%	41	2.89%	1,417
Multnomah	43,771	55.36%	35,295	44.64%	8,476	10.72%	79,066
Polk	2,968	66.32%	1,507	33.68%	1,461	32.65%	4,475
Sherman	537	51.29%	510	48.71%	27	2.58%	1,047
Tillamook	2,220	71.41%	889	28.59%	1,331	42.81%	3,109
Umatilla	4,733	60.79%	3,053	39.21%	1,680	21.58%	7,786
Union	3,153	70.10%	1,345	29.90%	1,808	40.20%	4,498
Wallowa	1,344	69.60%	587	30.40%	757	39.20%	1,931
Wasco	2,095	53.04%	1,855	46.96%	240	6.08%	3,950
Washington	3,768	50.41%	3,707	49.59%	61	0.82%	7,475
Wheeler	313	35.17%	577	64.83%	-264	-29.66%	890
Yamhill	4,048	62.39%	2,440	37.61%	1,608	24.78%	6,488
Total	133,392	57.36%	99,164	42.64%	34,228	14.72%	232,556

==== Counties that flipped from Republican to Democratic ====
- Baker
- Clackamas
- Clatsop
- Columbia
- Coos
- Crook
- Deschutes
- Grant
- Jackson
- Jefferson
- Josephine
- Lane
- Lincoln
- Morrow
- Multnomah
- Polk
- Sherman
- Tillamook
- Umatilla
- Wallowa
- Wasco
- Washington
- Yamhill
