= Lake Hotel (disambiguation) =

Lake Hotel is used as the name of several hotels including:

- Burj Dubai Lake Hotel and Serviced Apartments
- Hot Lake Hotel
- Lake Hotel in Yellowstone National Park
- Mountain Lake Hotel (Virginia)
- Mountain Lake Hotel, New York
- Raquette Lake Hotel
