= Scariest Places on Earth =

American television series

- Genre: Paranormal; Reality; Horror
- Presented by: Linda Blair
- Starring: Linda Blair; Alan Robson
- Narrated by: Zelda Rubinstein
- Country of origin: United States
- Original language: English
- No. of seasons: 5
- No. of episodes: 41

Production
- Executive producer: Steve Kroopnick
- Camera setup: Multiple-camera
- Running time: 44–46 minutes
- Production company: Triage Entertainment

Original release
- Network: Fox Family
- Release: October 23, 2000 – October 29, 2006

Scariest Places on Earth is an American paranormal reality television series that originally aired from October 23, 2000, to October 29, 2006, on Fox Family, and later ABC Family. Hosted by Linda Blair and narrated by Zelda Rubinstein, the series featured reported cases of the paranormal by detailing the location's history, and then sending ordinary families or groups of friends to visit the location in a reality television-style vigil.

== Synopsis ==
The series is hosted by Linda Blair, and narrated by Zelda Rubinstein. Alan Robson acted as an on-site correspondent. While the show is set in numerous locations around the world, the interstitials featuring Blair and Robson were shot in Los Angeles, California.

In a 2001 interview with Larry King, host Blair explained the series:

When we were kids, we used to tell ghost stories, but as we've gotten older—I have friends who are scientific researchers, and I ask them questions. My mother has passed on. I choose to think she is in a wonderful, other place that we all will go. But I think that some people are trapped here... Well, these are the places that people have talked about for years, and years, that they go in, and you physically feel something is wrong. Some people do see things. Whether it's in a mind, we don't know.

== Syndication ==
Reruns were aired on Syfy, which is a part of NBC Universal. It then aired on NBC Universal's now defunct horror- and suspense-themed cable channel Chiller.

== Home media ==
20th Century Fox Home Entertainment released a compilation VHS featuring seven segments from the series in 2001.

== Featured locations ==
=== North America ===
Location	City	State or province	Country	Ref.
Alcatraz Island	San Francisco	California	United States	
Alton Military Prison	Alton	Illinois	United States	
Amargosa Opera House and Hotel	Death Valley Junction	California	United States	
Athens Lunatic Asylum	Athens	Ohio	United States	
Borden House	Fall River	Massachusetts	United States	
Bunnyman Bridge	Fairfax	Virginia	United States	
Cheesman Park	Denver	Colorado	United States	
Dixmont State Hospital	Sewickley	Pennsylvania	United States	
Dorsey Mansion	Springer	New Mexico	United States	
Eastern State Penitentiary	Philadelphia	Pennsylvania	United States	
First Unitarian Church	Alton	Illinois	United States	
Fort Pulaski	Cockspur Island	Georgia	United States	
Goldfield Hotel	Goldfield	Nevada	United States	
Guanajuato Crypts	Guanajuato City	Guanajuato	Mexico	
Hot Lake Resort	Hot Lake	Oregon	United States	
Lake Shawnee Amusement Park	Princeton	West Virginia	United States	
McPike Mansion	Alton	Illinois	United States	
Magnolia Plantation	Derry	Louisiana	United States	
Mansfield Reformatory	Mansfield	Ohio	United States	
Metropolitan State Hospital	Waltham	Massachusetts	United States	
Mineral Springs Hotel	Alton	Illinois	United States	
Mission La Purísima Concepción	Lompoc	California	United States	
New Jersey Pine Barrens	Pine Barrens	New Jersey	United States	
New London Ledge Light	New London	Connecticut	United States	
Rose Hall	Montego Bay	Saint James Parish	Jamaica	
RMS Queen Mary	Long Beach	California	United States	
Savannah Underground	Savannah	Georgia	United States	
Seul Choix Light	Manistique	Michigan	United States	
Sloss Furnaces	Birmingham	Alabama	United States	
Thunderbird Lodge	Lake Tahoe	Nevada	United States	
Schilling farmhouse	Johnstown	Missouri	United States	
USS Hornet	Alameda	California	United States	
Villisca Ax Murder House	Villisca	Iowa	United States	
Waverly Hills Sanatorium	Louisville	Kentucky	United States	
West Virginia State Penitentiary	Moundsville	West Virginia	United States	
Westminster Hall and Burying Ground	Baltimore	Maryland	United States	
Wilson Hall	Athens	Ohio	United States	

=== Europe ===
Location	City	County or region	Country	Ref.
Abbey of Thelema	Cefalù	Sicily	Italy	
Balgonie Castle	Milton of Balgonie	Fife	Scotland	
Bran Castle	Bran	Brașov	Romania	
Cachtice Castle	Čachtice	Trenčín	Slovakia	
Catacombe dei Cappuccini	Palermo	Sicily	Italy	
Catacombs of Paris	Paris	Île-de-France	France	
Charleville Castle	Tullamore	County Offaly	Ireland	
Chillingham Castle	Chillingham	Northumberland	England	
Colosseum	Rome	Lazio	Italy	
Dalhousie Castle	Cockpen	Midlothian	Scotland	
Edinburgh Vaults	Edinburgh	City of Edinburgh council area	Scotland	
Greyfriars Kirkyard	Edinburgh	City of Edinburgh council area	Scotland	
Haydon Bridge	Haydon Bridge	Northumberland	England	
Hunedoara Castle	Hunedoara	Hunedoara	Romania	
Leap Castle	Coolderry	County Offaly	Ireland	
Lucedio Abbey	Trino	Vercelli	Italy	
Montpelier Hill	Wicklow Mountains	Dublin	Ireland	
Old Bell Hotel	Malmesbury	Wiltshire	England	
Oranmore Castle	Oranmore	Galway	Ireland	
Poveglia	Poveglia	Venice	Italy	
Walls of Genoa	Genoa	Liguria	Italy	
Woodchester Mansion	Woodchester	Gloucestershire	England	

== Controversies ==
The main controversy with the show was that it was accused of fabricating some of the aired events. According to the documentary crew for a film on the Villisca axe murders, the segment which profiled the murder site—the Josiah B. and Sara Moore House—contained numerous falsities; among the allegations were that it featured a fake newspaper reproduction, photos of an unknown family presented as the murder victims, and an actress posing as a town resident.

Additionally, the "Devil Hunters" crew featured in the segment on the Jersey Devil claimed that the segment which ran thirteen minutes in length, had been edited from two days' worth of footage, and that numerous details were sensationalized and/or added in post-production.

== See also ==
- Paranormal television
- Apparitional experience
- Parapsychology
- Ghost hunting
- Haunted locations in the United States
