= City View Cemetery =

Cemetery in Salem, Oregon, United States

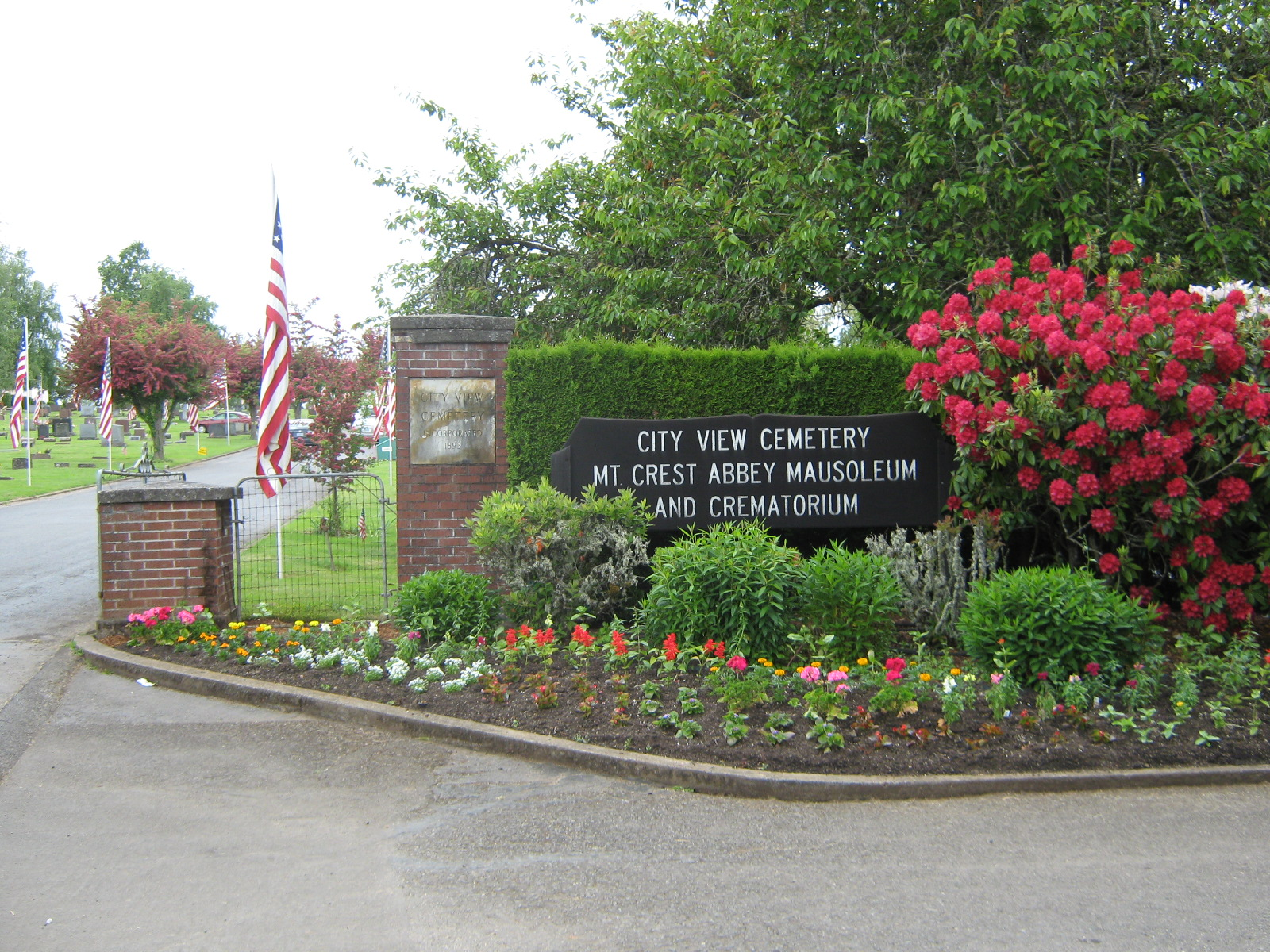
- Entrance to the cemetery
- Interactive map of City View Cemetery

Details
- Established: 1893
- Location: 390 Hoyt Street South, Salem, Oregon 97302
- Country: United States
- Coordinates: 44.9192°N 123.0527°W
- Owned by: Richard Hilts
- Website: official site

City View Cemetery is a privately owned cemetery in Salem, Oregon, United States, that was established in 1893. Its Mount Crest Abbey Mausoleum, opened in 1914, contains the remains of eight governors of Oregon.

== History ==
The cemetery was established in 1893 just west of the existing Salem Pioneer Cemetery on land purchased by Jason Porter Frizzell, who had settled in Salem after traveling with his parents on the Oregon Trail. In 1950, the cemetery was purchased by Herman M. and Leta Johnston, and in 1970, by William and Fern Hilts. The cemetery is currently owned by Richard Hilts, son of William and Fern and nephew of Leta Johnston.

== Facilities ==
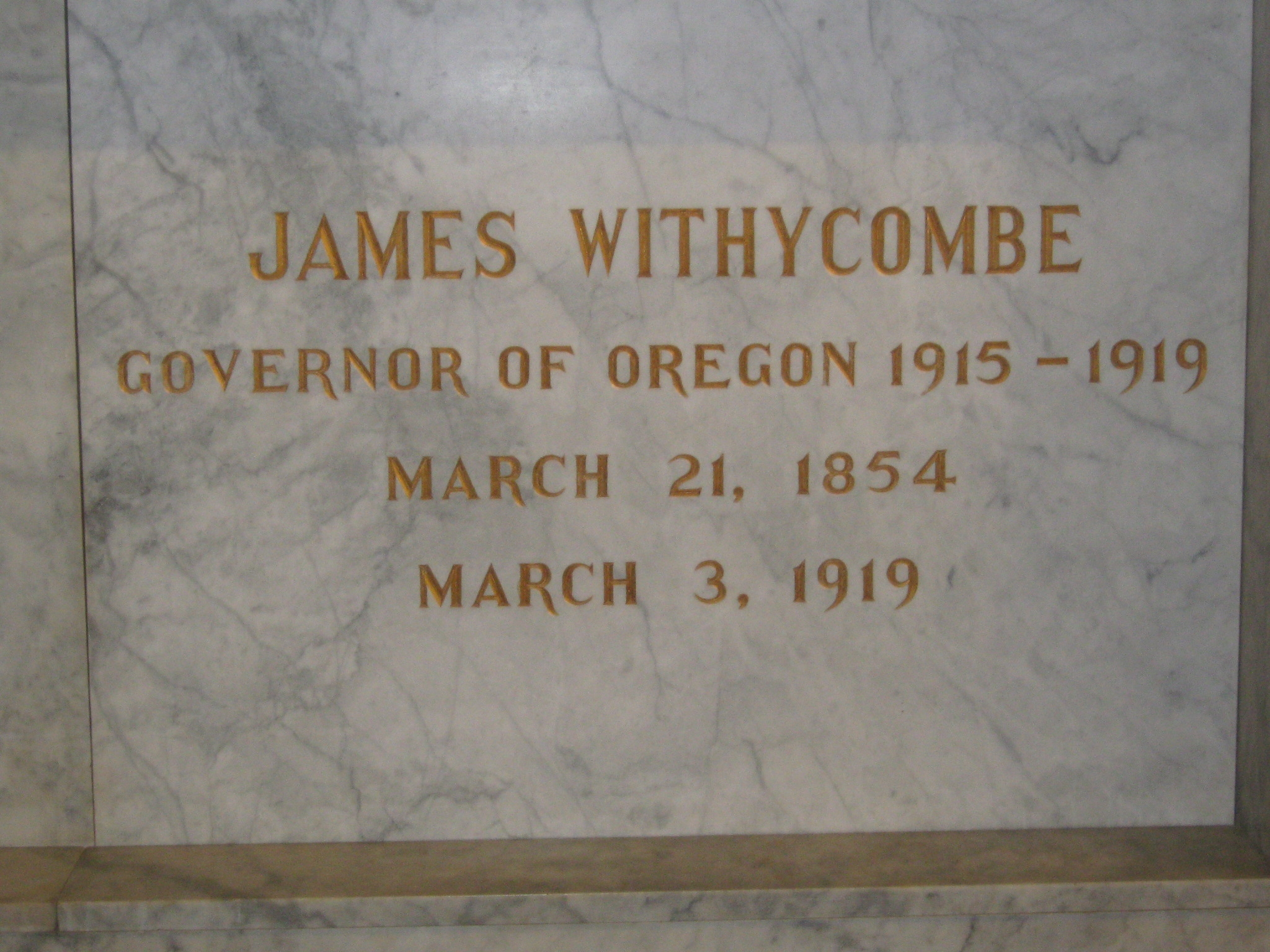
Crypt of Oregon Governor James Withycombe in the cemetery's Mount Crest Abbey Mausoleum

The cemetery contains the hilltop Mount Crest Abbey Mausoleum, which opened in 1914. It was built in the Classical Greek/Roman style by the architectural firm of Lawrence & Holford, and was also likely designed by noted Oregon architect Ellis F. Lawrence. An addition to the mausoleum was completed in 1929 by the same firm. The cemetery also has two outdoor mausoleums, and two crematories. Special areas recognize veterans of wars fought by Americans since the American Civil War and on Memorial Day, the Oregon Air National Guard conducts a flyover of the cemetery to honor those interred at City View. A funeral home was completed in 1999.

== Notable burials ==
A number of notable Oregonians, in particular, eight of the 36 people to have served as the state's governor, are buried in the City View Cemetery grounds, or are interred in Mount Crest Abbey Mausoleum.

- Charles Pleasant Bishop (1854–1941), businessman and former mayor of Salem
- Willis C. Hawley (1864–1941), U.S. Representative and president of Willamette University
- Thomas C. King (c.1847 - 1904), early Black settler
- William Paine Lord (1838–1911), 9th Governor of Oregon; 11th Chief Justice of the Oregon Supreme Court
- Conde B. McCullough (1887–1946), Bridge engineer for the state of Oregon. Designer of numerous bridges throughout the state, including many along Oregon Coast Highway 101.
- Zenas Ferry Moody (1832–1917), 7th Governor of Oregon
- Frank A. Moore (1844–1918), 17th Chief Justice of the Oregon Supreme Court
- James W. Mott (1883–1945), U.S. Representative
- Larry Norman (1947–2008), Christian musician, singer, and songwriter
- Ben W. Olcott (1872–1952), 16th Governor of Oregon
- I. L. Patterson (1859–1929), 18th Governor of Oregon
- Mary Peters (1852–1921), "Indian Mary", ferry operator and park namesake
- Walter M. Pierce (1861–1954), 17th Governor of Oregon; U.S. Representative
- Henry Schauer (1918–1997), U.S. Army soldier and recipient of the Medal of Honor
- Charles A. Sprague (1887–1969), 22nd Governor of Oregon
- Oswald West (1873–1960), 14th Governor of Oregon
- James Withycombe (1854–1919), 15th Governor of Oregon
