= Thomas C. King =

Thomas C. King (c. 1847 – 1904) was one of the first Black settlers in Oregon. He was one of the subjects of an exhibit by artist Jeremy Okai Davis featuring portraits of Oregon's Black pioneers. The exhibit—ReEnvisioned—represented the contributions of these Black pioneers to the history of Oregon. The exhibit premiered at the University of Oregon's Museum of Natural and Cultural History in 2026.

King was born in Jessamine County, Kentucky, circa 1847, one of eleven children born to a sexton. According to the US Census Slave schedules, King was one of 3,614 enslaved people of African descent in Jessamine County.

Although the details of his early life are sparse, according to newspaper accounts, he was living in Salem, Oregon, in July 1891, when he was identified as representing Kentucky at a "States Picnic" that welcomed newcomers to the city.

King worked as a driver for the Wallace Family fruit farm in what is now Salem, transporting both passengers and fruit sent for processing at local canneries. In 1902, he claimed a homestead in Tillamook County under the 1862 Homestead Act.

King died of heart trouble near Salem, Oregon, on March 5, 1904. He is buried in City View Cemetery.
