= Parish L. Willis =

American politician

Parish Lovejoy Willis
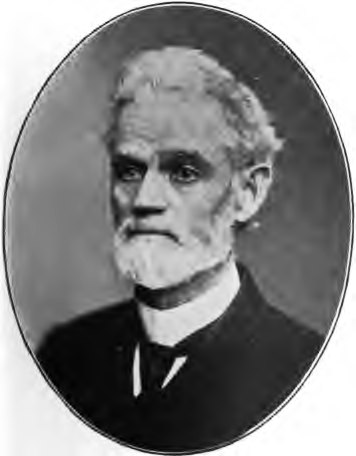

Oregon State Senator
- In office 1891 – 1895
- Constituency: Multnomah County

Personal details
- Born: November 3, 1838 Putnam County, Illinois
- Died: October 28, 1917 (aged 78) Los Angeles, California
- Party: Republican
- Spouse: Iren H. Stratton
- Education: Willamette University
- Occupation: Attorney

Parish Lovejoy Willis (November 3, 1838 – October 28, 1917) was an American attorney and politician in the state of Oregon. A native of Illinois, he served as cavalry in the Rogue River War before becoming a lawyer. A Republican, he served one term in the Oregon State Senate in the early 1890s.

== Early life ==
Parish Lovejoy Willis was born on November 3, 1838, in Putnam County, Illinois, to Stephen Daws Willis and Nancy Ann Ross. He was educated in the public schools of Illinois before the family moved to the Oregon Territory in 1852. During the Rogue River War in Southern Oregon he served as a private in the mounted volunteers from March to June 1857.

Willis continued his education at the Umpqua Academy in Roseburg from 1859 to 1861. He then went to Salem and attended Willamette University from 1862 to 1865. In July 1865, he graduated from the school with a bachelor of arts degree. While in school he also kept the monthly weather data for Salem from 1863 to 1865. Also while still a student Oregon Governor A. C. Gibbs appointed Willis as the state librarian, beginning service on July 5, 1864. He was later elected by the Oregon Legislative Assembly to the position and served until October 19, 1866.

On September 6, 1866, he married Iren H. Stratton in Salem, and they had two daughters and one son. That same month Willis was admitted to the bar and began practicing law in Salem in partnership with Richard Williams. The law firm lasted until 1873 when Willis left to partner with Reuben P. Boise for three years. In 1879, he moved to Portland where practiced in partnership with Seneca Smith until 1883. Willis then partnered with Williams again for two years and then went into a solo practice.

== Political career ==
Willis was elected to the Oregon State Senate in 1890 to represent District 17 in Multnomah County. Elected as a Republican, he served one, four-year term in the legislature spanning two legislative sessions. During the 1893 session he served as chairman of the assessments committee.

== Later years ==
In business he was involved in a variety of ventures as a board member including the banking, telephone, and the mining industries. Willis was a major shareholder of the Hot Lake Sanatorium Company in Eastern Oregon along with future governor Walter M. Pierce. They were both accused of fraud by another investor, but cleared by the courts of any wrongdoing in 1918. The former sanatorium is now the Hot Lake Hotel and is listed on the National Register of Historic Places. Parish Willis died on October 28, 1917, in Los Angeles, California, at the age of 78.
