= Kaspar K. Kubli =

American politician

- Speaker of the Oregon House, 1923-1924

30th Speaker of the Oregon House of Representatives
- In office 1923–1924
- Preceded by: Louis E. Bean
- Succeeded by: Denton G. Burdick

Member of the Oregon House of Representatives from the 18th district
- In office 1917–1924, 1928–1929

Personal details
- Born: April 21, 1869 Jacksonville, Oregon
- Died: December 22, 1943 (aged 74) Portland, Oregon
- Party: Republican
- Profession: Businessman

Kaspar Kap Kubli, Jr. (April 21, 1869 – December 22, 1943) was an American politician in the state of Oregon. Closely associated with the Ku Klux Klan, Kubli, a member of the Republican party, was elected Speaker of the Oregon House of Representatives in 1923. Among legislation passed under Kubli during his five terms of office include the Oregon Criminal Syndicalism Act in 1919.

== Biography ==
=== Early years ===
Kaspar K. Kubli, Jr., known to his friends as "Kap," was born April 21, 1869, in Jacksonville, Oregon. His father, Kaspar Kubli, Sr. (1830-1897), was an emigrant from Switzerland who arrived in the Oregon Territory in 1853, where he first tried his hand at gold mining before becoming an overland freight hauler, moving goods in a pack train from the port city of Crescent City, California, to Jacksonville in Southern Oregon. In 1872 his father would open a general store, which he operated for the rest of his life. He also dabbled in local politics, being twice elected as treasurer of Jackson County, Oregon.

The younger Kubli attended public schools in Jacksonville before enrolling at the University of Oregon, from which he graduated with a bachelor's degree in 1893. Following graduation, he attended Harvard Law School, obtaining a law degree from that institution in 1896.

Despite his academic achievement, Kubli would never practice law. Instead, Kubli returned to Jacksonville and went into the mining business as president of the Golden Standard Mining Company. A career change followed in 1901 when he moved upstate to the growing urban center of Portland to join the Kilham Stationery Co. In 1906, he went into the stationery business himself, Kubli-Howell Company, a Portland firm which did contract printing and sold office supplies.

=== Local politician ===
In Portland, Kubli became active in Republican Party politics. He was first elected to the Portland City Council in November 1904 and sat as a member of that body from 1905 to 1909. He also sat on the city's executive board from 1911 to 1913.

In November 1916 Kubli set his sights on higher office, successfully running for a seat in the Oregon House of Representatives. He would ultimately serve four consecutive terms in that body.

=== Oregon legislator ===
Kubli was very effective in gaining passage of the legislation he authored. After his first three sessions as a legislator in Salem, he had introduced a total of 28 measures, including a landmark criminal syndicalism bill, winning passage of 20 of these and seeing substitutes passed for 4 others. Among Kubli's bills passed were appropriations for road construction, the support of the Oregon National Guard, and increased pensions for war widows. A 1917 measure which would have greatly restricted picketing narrowly passed the House but was defeated by the Oregon State Senate.

The 1917 legislature, of which Kubli was a part, is also remembered for its passage of legislation allowing the state to force sterilization of "feeble minded, insane, epileptic, habitual criminals, moral degenerates and sexual perverts." In all, approximately 127 forced sterilizations would be conducted before the law was ruled to be unconstitutional in 1921, including some 66 castrations, many of gay men — 92% of the total nationwide between the years 1907 and 1921.

A staunch nativist, Kubli was a supporter in the legislature of bills prohibiting non-citizens from owning land or teaching in Oregon schools. He also supported exclusion of women from juries and efforts to restore the full power of the judicial injunction against strikes. He was hailed in 1922 by the conservative magazine Oregon Voter as an "exceptionally vigorous debater and floor leader" who was "fearless and uncompromising" in his voting behavior. He was considered by some a "red blooded protagonist" of conservative Republican politics. At the same time, Kubli advocated the usage of tax money for the construction of roads, a progressive viewpoint.

Kubli was the author of Oregon's criminal syndicalism statute, introducing the bill House Bill 1 on January 14 at the opening of the 1919 session of the legislature. The bill was intended as a legal weapon to be used against the syndicalist Industrial Workers of the World and made it a felony for anyone to advocate in word or writing any doctrine involving "crime, sabotage, violence or any other unlawful methods of terrorism as a means of accomplishing industrial or political reform." Anyone editing, printing, or circulating a newspaper or pamphlet advocating such doctrines or assisting in formation of an organization or society in support of such activities was to be subject to the law, which called for penalties of up to 10 years in prison and potential fines of up to $5,000. In addition, Kubli's bill called for any building owner or manager found renting a facility to such a group was to be deemed guilty of having committed a misdemeanor punishable by up to 1 year in the county jail.

Kubli's bill moved speedily through the legislative process and was signed into law on February 3, 1919, with an emergency provision attached putting the law into immediate effect. Authorities made immediate use of the new law, arresting the State Secretary of the Socialist Party of Oregon and five others for selling copies of The Western Socialist on the streets of Portland and for "distributing handbills without a license" less than one week after the criminal syndicalism law took effect.

=== Ku Klux Klan connection ===
This ad from Oregon Voter magazine promises passage of an American Legion-sponsored "anti-alien land ownership bill" in the forthcoming 1923 legislature. The legislation is unabashedly touted as being "anti-Japanese" and patterned upon similar laws in the states of California and Washington.

During the early 1920s, Kubli joined the resurgent Ku Klux Klan (KKK), an organization which briefly achieved a mass presence in the United States. The Klan expanded rapidly in Oregon in 1921, marching in white-hooded uniforms at the state fairgrounds in Salem on November 11 for Armistice Day. Klan members were elected to city office in Astoria, Tillamook, and Eugene and staunchly backed State Senator Charles Hill in an insurgent campaign to defeat incumbent Governor Ben Olcott in his bid for re-election in 1922. Although Olcott emerged victorious in the primary election, the Klan threw its organizational support behind Democrat Walter M. Pierce in the November general election, and managed to defeat Olcott in the November 1922 general election despite a 2-to-1 Republican advantage in voter registration in the state.

Grand Dragon of the KKK in Oregon Fred Gifford maintained an excellent political relationship with Portland mayor George L. Baker, an ambitious city politician known for making melodramatic patriotic speeches before fawning audiences and who made early and heavy use of Kubli's criminal syndicalism law against radical political dissidents. Baker deputized 100 vigilantes, many of whom were Klansmen, with police authority in December 1921 and was reported by the former editor of the state Klan's newspaper to have been an official member of the organization.

The populist Kaspar K. Kubli — a man with distinctive initials difficult to miss — was a natural fit for the rising KKK in Oregon. He was unabashed in accepting a free membership in the Portland chapter of the organization offered on the basis of his initials alone, and was enthusiastic in promoting the organization's nativist and anti-Catholic agenda. He found membership in the organization to be no impediment at the polls, handily winning election to a fourth term in the Oregon legislature in November, 1922.

Kubli was elected Speaker of the House by the Republican majority for the 1923 session. He was energetic on behalf of the Klan, attempting to recruit other legislators to the KKK and even attended initiation ceremonies held behind closed doors at the capitol.

It was during this session that Kubli helped see passage of a bill into law which prohibited teachers from wearing religious clothing in the classroom — a law targeted at the parochial schools of the Roman Catholic church. This anti-Catholic law would remain in effect in the state until finally repealed in 2010.

Kubli also helped marshal even more draconian legislation backed by the KKK into law in the form of the Oregon Compulsory Education Act, a bill which would have required all Oregon children between the ages of 8 and 16 to attend public schools — effectively eliminating the private schools, mostly Roman Catholic, attended by about 7% of the state's children. This act was struck down by the United States Supreme Court in 1925 without having gone into effect, with the court ruling that such a measure represented an unconstitutional violation of parental rights to educate their children in schools of their own choice.

Aim was also taken at Japanese immigrants with the Alien Property Act of 1923, which prohibited Japanese-born citizens from purchasing or leasing land in the state of Oregon.

=== Political defeat ===
In 1924, riding high as Speaker of the House of the Oregon State Legislature, Kubli left his seat to attempt a run for the United States Senate, running as a conservative alternative to progressive Republican incumbent Senator Charles McNary. The effort proved unsuccessful. He attempted a political comeback in 1926 in a race for the Oregon Senate but was once again defeated.

Only in 1928 was Kubli able to win office again, successfully running to reclaim his old state House of Representatives seat in Salem.

=== Final years and legacy ===
Kubli retired from his stationery business in 1941. His retirement was brief, and he died on December 22, 1943, at the age of 74.

Kubli was survived by a wife and two daughters. His funeral was held in Portland.
