= Henry Schauer =

- Born: October 9, 1918; Clinton, Oklahoma, U.S.
- Died: June 16, 1997 (aged 78); Salem, Oregon, U.S.
- Burial place: City View Cemetery Salem, Oregon
- Military career
- Allegiance: United States of America
- Branch: United States Army
- Rank: Technical Sergeant
- Units: 2nd Battalion, 15th Infantry Regiment, 3rd Infantry Division
- Conflicts: World War II
- Awards: Medal of Honor; Purple Heart

Henry Schauer (October 9, 1918 – June 16, 1997) was a United States Army soldier and a recipient of the United States military's highest decoration—the Medal of Honor—for his actions in World War II.

Schauer joined the Army from Scobey, Montana, and by May 23, 1944, was serving as a private first class in the 15th Infantry Regiment, 3rd Infantry Division. On that day, near Cisterna di Littoria, Italy, he single-handedly killed five German snipers and disabled two machine gun emplacements. The next day he destroyed a third German machine gun nest. He was subsequently promoted to technical sergeant and, on October 27, 1944, awarded the Medal of Honor.

Schauer died at age 78 and was buried in Salem, Oregon's City View Cemetery.

== Medal of Honor citation ==
Schauer's official Medal of Honor citation reads:

For conspicuous gallantry and intrepidity at risk of life above and beyond the call of duty. On May 23, 1944, at 12 noon, Pfc. (now T/Sgt.) Schauer left the cover of a ditch to engage 4 German snipers who opened fire on the patrol from its rear. Standing erect he walked deliberately 30 yards toward the enemy, stopped amid the fire from 4 rifles centered on him, and with 4 bursts from his BAR, each at a different range, killed all of the snipers. Catching sight of a fifth sniper waiting for the patrol behind a house chimney, Pfc. Schauer brought him down with another burst. Shortly after, when a heavy enemy artillery concentration and 2 machineguns temporarily halted the patrol, Pfc. Schauer again left cover to engage the enemy weapons single-handed. While shells exploded within 15 yards, showering dirt over him, and strings of grazing German tracer bullets whipped past him at chest level, Pfc. Schauer knelt, killed the 2 gunners of the machinegun only 60 yards from him with a single burst from his BAR, and crumpled 2 other enemy soldiers who ran to man the gun. Inserting a fresh magazine in his BAR, Pfc. Schauer shifted his body to fire at the other weapon 500 yards distant and emptied his weapon into the enemy crew, killing all 4 Germans. Next morning, when shells from a German Mark VI tank and a machinegun only 100 yards distant again forced the patrol to seek cover, Pfc. Schauer crawled toward the enemy machinegun. stood upright only 80 yards from the weapon as its bullets cut the surrounding ground, and 4 tank shells fired directly at him burst within 20 yards. Raising his BAR to his shoulder, Pfc. Schauer killed the 4 members of the German machinegun crew with 1 burst of fire.

== See also ==
- List of Medal of Honor recipients
- List of Medal of Honor recipients for World War II
