= Hot Lake Hotel =

Historic hotel in Hot Lake, Oregon, United States

- Hot Lake Hotel in 2008
- Interactive map of the Hot Lake Hotel area

General information
- Type: Sanatorium; hotel; hospital
- Architectural style: Colonial Revival; shingle style
- Location: Hot Lake, Oregon, United States
- Coordinates: 45°14′36″N 117°57′24″W

Design and construction
- Architect: John Virginius Bennes

Website
- hotlakespringsresort.com
- Hot Lake Resort
- U.S. National Register of Historic Places
- Location within Oregon Location within the United States
- Built: 1864 (first incarnation); 1907 (final construction)
- Restored: 2003–2010
- NRHP reference No.: 79002148
- Added to NRHP: March 15, 1979

Hot Lake Hotel (also known as Hot Lake Sanatorium and Hot Lake Resort) is a historic hotel, mineral spa resort, and former sanatorium and hospital established in 1864 in Hot Lake, Union County, Oregon, United States. The hotel received its namesake from the thermal lake on the property, which is the largest hot spring in Oregon. It operated as a luxury health resort and sanatorium beginning at the turn of the 20th century, advertising the medicinal attributes of the mineral water and drawing visitors worldwide. It is the first known commercial building in the world to utilize geothermal energy as its primary heat source. The hotel and surrounding structures were added to the National Register of Historic Places in 1979.

The original multi-use structure built in 1864 housed a post office, blacksmith, dance hall, bathhouse, and various other businesses. Construction of a new hotel and sanatorium began in 1900 after the establishment of the Union Pacific Railroad. Opening as a sanatorium in 1907, the facility touted the alleged health benefits of the lake's thermal spring water. Dr. William Thomas Phy acquired the property in 1917 and escalated its use as a sanatorium and experimental medical facility, earning it the moniker "the Mayo Clinic of the West."

After a fire burned down over half of the building in 1934, the remaining structure continued operations as a resort and sanatorium, as well as housing a nurse's training school during World War II. In 1952, it was converted into a nursing home for the elderly and disabled before the property was sold in 1977. Following a brief stint housing a restaurant and dance hall, the property was passed through various owners before it was abandoned in 1991 and fell into significant disrepair.

The property underwent significant restoration beginning in 2003 by the Manuel family, who operated a resort and foundry on the grounds, before it changed ownership in 2020 and was renamed Hot Lake Springs Resort. Contemporarily, the property houses hotel rooms, a pub and restaurant, a movie theater, and soaking pools.

== Background ==
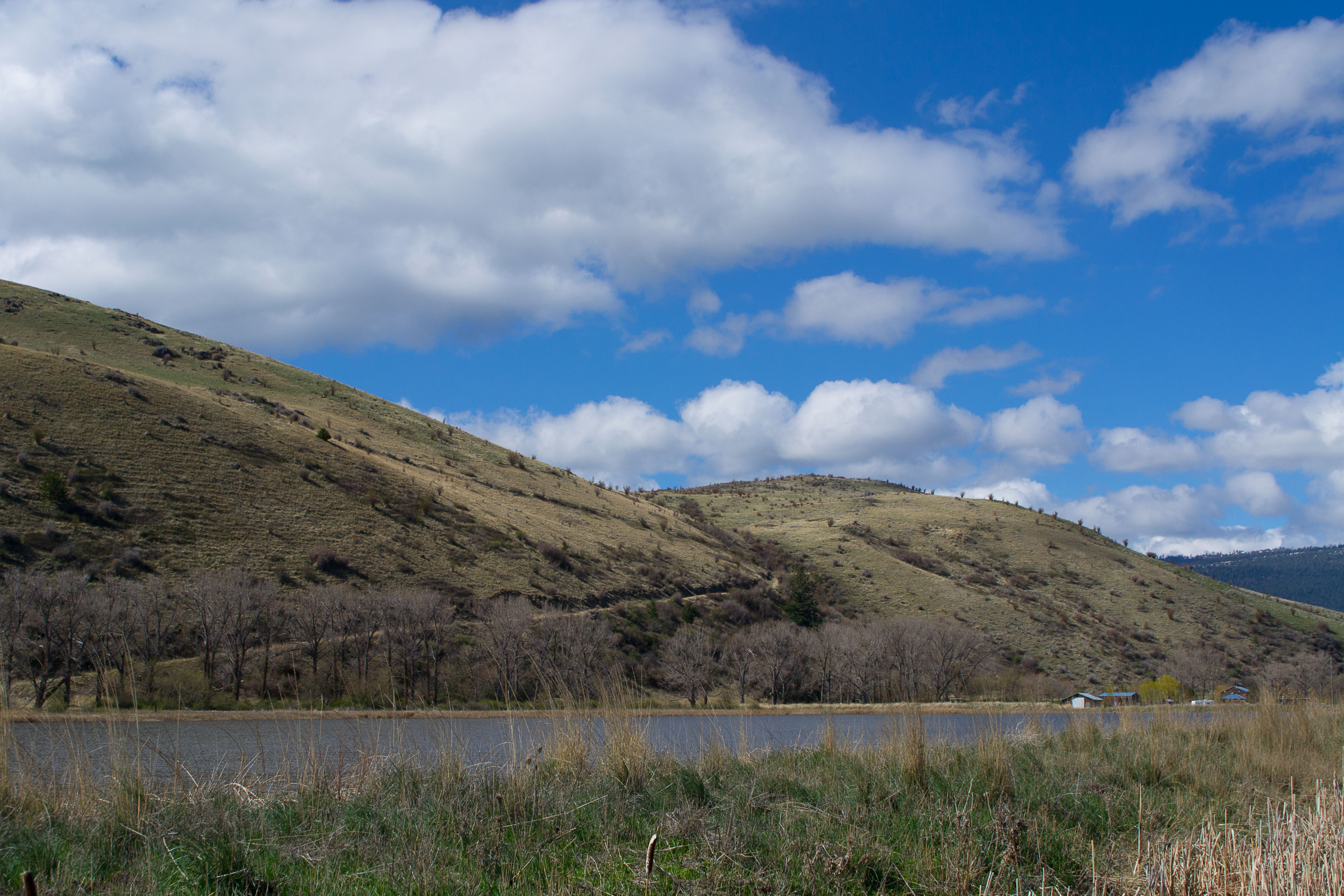
A portion of Hot Lake, as viewed from the hotel grounds

The hot springs that make up Hot Lake themselves rest at the foot of a large bluff, and were used by Native Americans before settlement and colonization occurred in the area; the lake was named "Ea-Kesh-Pa" by the Nez Perce. Over 2,000,000 US gallons (7,600,000 L) of mineral-rich hot water flow daily from the spring, naturally heated at approximately 185 °F (85 °C).

It is thought by historians that Hot Lake was one of the first thermal springs to be visited by European settlers, and the springs themselves were documented by Washington Irving in his recording of Robert Stuart's explorations during the Astor Expedition in 1812. Irving wrote in his record:

Emerging from the chain of Blue Mountains, they descended upon a vast plain, almost a dead level, sixty miles in circumference, of excellent soil ... In traversing this plain, they passed, close to the skirt of the hills, a great pool of water, three hundred yards in circumference, fed by a sulphur spring, about ten feet in diameter, boiling up in one corner. The place was much frequented by elk, which were found in considerable numbers in the adjacent mountains, and their horns, shed in the spring-time, were strewed in every direction around the pond.

After the Oregon Trail expedition brought settlers into the area, the land surrounding the lakes was utilized as a cattle ranch, and was purchased by a sailor named Tommy Atkins. An apocryphal story claiming that Atkins was cured of numerous health ailments after falling into the spring was published in The Oregonian in 1914 in a piece detailing the hotel's history.

== History ==
=== 1864–1906: Initial construction ===
In 1864, Samuel Fitzgerald Newhart, a native of California, arrived in the Grande Ronde Valley, and constructed the original wooden structure on the lake, which faced toward the bluff rather than outward toward the lake. The structure was similar to the contents of a modern-day shopping mall, containing a post office, blacksmith, dance hall, barber shop, bath house, and several other businesses.

By 1884, the Union Pacific Railroad commenced its construction, running near Hot Lake. Circa 1900, construction began on a new hotel addition and various bathhouses. Dr. William Thomas "W. T." Phy, a prominent physician and surgeon in the Pacific Northwest, became involved with the project in 1904, and construction of a brick structure intended for use as a sanatorium on the grounds commenced.

=== 1907–1933: Early years ===
1912 newspaper advertisement extolling the sanatorium's thermal waters for treating rheumatism

Renowned architect John V. Bennes of nearby Baker City has been attributed to the architectural design of the building, reminiscent of the Colonial era; Bennes also designed numerous buildings on the Oregon State University campus, as well as several buildings in Portland. In 1906, the main brick wing of the hotel was completed, which alone comprised 65,000 square feet (0.60 ha). The construct featured a Georgian-style U-shape with a solarium facing the bluff. The building was heated with the geothermal waters, and was the first known commercial property in the world to use geothermal heating.

Hot Lake Sanatorium in 1915

Upon its expansion, the establishment housed a total of 105 guest rooms, a 60-bed surgical ward and third-floor operating theater. It came to be known by locals as "The Town Under One Roof" due to its various amenities, which included a ballroom, barber shop, confectionery, drug store, post office, bank, railroad depot, news stand, reception rooms, laboratories, and a commissary. The resort also featured state-of-the-art soaking tubs supplied by the spring water, a 1,500-guest dance hall, its own laundry facilities, a woodworking plant, express telephone office, and a telegraph station. It functioned as a mostly self-sufficient property, producing its own vegetables, dairy products, meats, and eggs. The establishment was advertised as "not a summer resort or hotel, but a place where sick people go to get cured," and was promoted as the "most thoroughly equipped" surgical facility west of Chicago.

In 1910, the sanatorium grossed $178,811 in yearly revenue, and the use of the building's geothermal heating system reportedly saved $15,000 per year in heating costs. In 1911, a show barn was built on the property, and a movie theater opened in the main hotel the following year. Beginning in 1912, Oregon state senator Parish L. Willis and future Oregon governor Walter M. Pierce served as owners and trustees of the establishment. At this time, the resort had expanded to contain 300 guest rooms.

=== 1917–1933: Acquisition by Dr. W. T. Phy ===
Dr. William Thomas Phy, 1907

In 1917, Dr. Phy purchased the property, renaming it "Hot Lake Sanitorium". The building was from then on known not only as a resort for the wealthy, but also as a hospital for the ill; the geothermal mineral waters from the springs were used and experimented with to help treat patients and guests, making the resort a pioneering establishment in western experimental medicine. Dr. Phy was known for his flamboyant personality and determination to bring "cutting edge medical care to his patients."

By 1924, the hotel had become a major tourist attraction, attracting visitors worldwide. Some sources suggest the Mayo brothers, founders of the Mayo Clinic, were visitors of the resort, though historian Dick Roth, whose father later owned the hotel, stated that this story is apocryphal: "There is no documentation that he had any social interaction with the Mayo brothers and no documentation that they ever visited. There is absolutely no merit to the story. It is interesting (but) there is no basis of fact." Staffing fifteen nurses, four physicians, a radiographer, and a bacteriologist, the establishment garnered a reputation as "The Mayo Clinic of the West." A promotional advertisement from the Oregon Pacific Railroad promoted the purported healing properties of the waters, stating:

[Hot Lake Springs Resort] is the largest, hottest, and most curative springs known; best bathing facilities, most courteous attendants; first-class medical and surgical conveniences; finest operating room in the west; steam heat, electric lights; hot and cold water throughout the building

Other advertisements touted the drinking of the water as relieving a variety of ailments including heart lesions, nephritis, and high blood pressure, as well as claiming mud baths and poultice made with lake sediment as being beneficial for treatment of rheumatism. Phy attempted to treat syphilis patients using the lake's thermal water, erroneously theorizing that the virus would be unable to withstand the water due to its high sulfur content.

In March 1931, Dr. Phy died at Hot Lake of bulbar paralysis after battling septic arthritis for several months.

=== 1934–1973: Fire and acquisition by Dr. Adolph Roth ===
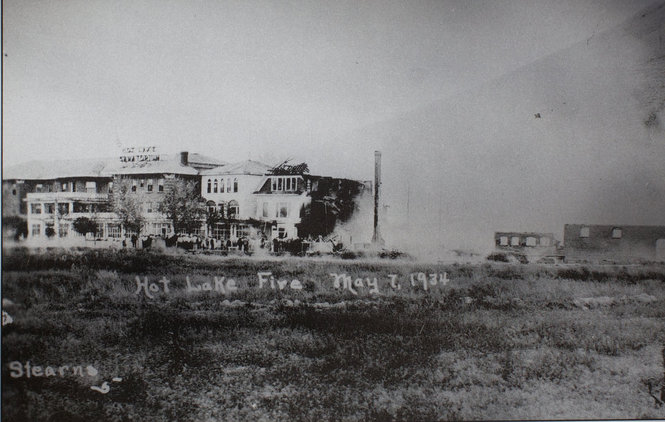
Hot Lake Hotel in the aftermath of the 1934 fire

On the morning of May 7, 1934, a fire broke out in the west end of the hotel, completely destroying the wooden shingle style structure along with the bathhouse. The cause of the fire, which originated in a disused attic space, was unable to be identified. Eleven patients and two infants who were present at the fire escaped unharmed. The 65,000-square-foot (6,000 m^{2}) eastern brick portion of the building survived the blaze, but the resort estimated $75,000 (equivalent to $1,805,037 in 2025) in damages.

Prior to the fire, the building had contained nearly 300 rooms and dining areas for over 1,000 guests. From then on, business at the hotel declined, and eventually the hospital area on the third floor was the only functioning business. A flight school and nurse's training center was established at the hotel in 1939 during World War II.

In 1942, the property was acquired by bacteriologist Dr. Adolph Roth, and at that time was in poor condition. The Roth family operated the hotel as a resort and health spa from 1942 until 1952. Following the construction of U.S. Route 30 and Oregon Route 203 reduced passing traffic near the property, the Roths converted the building into a nursing home for the elderly and disabled, ceasing its operations as a resort.

=== 1974–2002: Operational changes and decline ===
The property functioned as a nursing home under Dr. Roth until 1974 when ownership changed to Dave and Donna Pattee, who began operating a restaurant and dance hall there between 1976 and 1977.

In the fall of 1977 after the property went into foreclosure, former Manhattan stockbroker and San Francisco-based developer Steve Munson purchased it. Munson's plans for developing the hotel into a destination resort, however, "never got off the ground," despite his owning it for eight years. In 1985, Dr. Lyle Griffith, a La Grande physician, purchased the property with Salem developer George Heidgerken and began operating one corner of the hotel as a bath house.

Hot Lake Hotel during its abandonment, c. early 2000s

By 1991, the bath house closed down, and the hotel was abandoned, falling prey to local vandals and the elements; however, an RV park constructed in 1988 operated adjacent to the hotel approximately a 1/2 mile (0.80 km) away. The building remained unoccupied throughout the 1990s, despite having been purchased by the Seattle-based B.B.R. Holdings corporation. During this period, the structure was heavily vandalized and rapidly deteriorating due to the elements.

=== 2003–2019: Restoration efforts ===
In 2003, the building was purchased from Charles and Louise Rhea by David Manuel. Restoration began soon after; the building was greatly dilapidated, with all 368 windows broken and/or missing, and a sparsely-remaining roof. After two years of construction, it was opened to the public for tours in 2005, while individual guest rooms were still being sponsored and renovated. Despite setbacks—including the west wing collapsing in 2008)—the Manuel family continued restoration efforts.

By 2010, the building functioned as a bed and breakfast, with restored rooms, a spa, restaurant, bronze foundry, and museum.

=== 2020—present: Ownership change ===
In April 2020, Michael Rysavy, the owner of Grande Hot Springs RV Resort located next door to Hot Lake Springs, took over management. Further renovations were undertaken, including the addition of a pub, upgraded rooms, a hot springs soaking area, and a 60-seat movie theater. The hotel underwent significant upgrades in plumbing and electrical systems, fire suppression systems and structural improvements to revitalize the building.

In 2021, 15 renovated suites were opened for lodging, offering guests 24-hour access to the pools. There are future plans to add up to 25 more pools.

== In culture ==
In 2001, the then-derelict property was featured on the ABC Family documentary series The Scariest Places on Earth, which highlighted alleged paranormal activity in the hotel. The hotel was also used as a shooting location for a music video by musician Laura Gibson in 2012.

== See also ==
- National Register of Historic Places listings in Union County, Oregon
- Reportedly haunted locations in Oregon

== Sources ==
- Barklow, Irene (1987). From Trails to Rails: The Post Offices, Stage Stops and Wagon Roads of Union County. Enterprise, Oregon: Enchantments Publishing of Oregon. ISBN 978-0-961-81852-4.
- Barnes, Christine (2004). Only in Oregon: Natural and Manmade Landmarks and Oddities. Helena, Montana: Farcountry Press. ISBN 978-1-560-37292-9.
- Birkby, Jeff (2014). Touring Hot Springs Washington and Oregon: A Guide to the States' Best Hot Springs (Second ed.). Guilford, Connecticut: FalconGuides. ISBN 978-1-493-01465-1.
- Cleveland, Cutler J.; Morris, Christopher G. (2015). Dictionary of Energy (Second ed.). Amsterdam, Netherlands: Elsevier. ISBN 978-0-081-01505-6.
- Smitten, Susan (2001). Ghost Stories of Oregon. Edmonton, Alberta: Ghost House Books. ISBN 978-1-894-87713-8.
