= Hot Lake, Oregon =

Human settlement in Oregon, US, and large thermal spring

Coordinates: 45°14′40″N 117°57′28″W

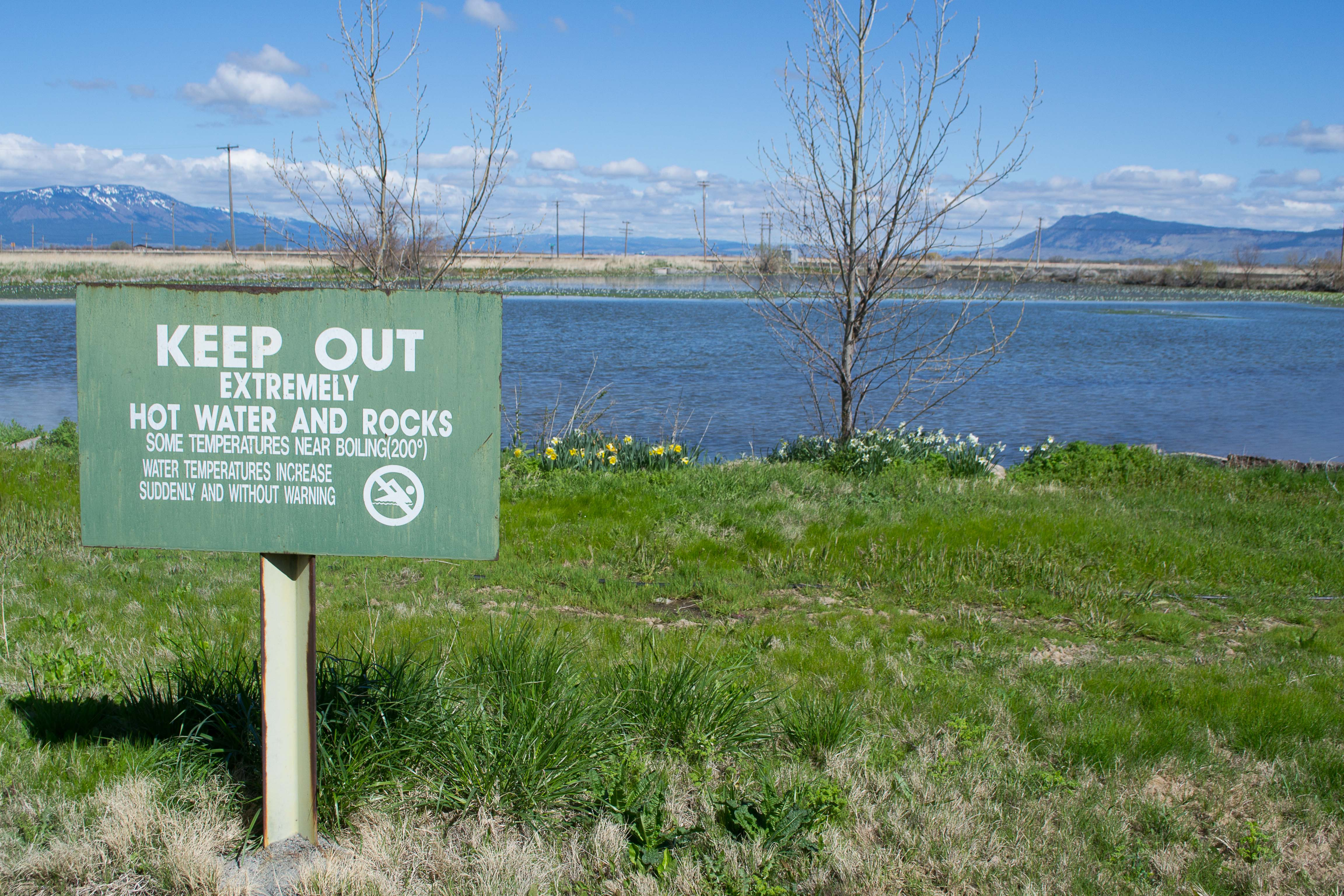
A warning sign at Hot Lake Springs, Oregon

Hot Lake is an unincorporated community in Union County, Oregon, United States. Hot Lake has an elevation of 2,704 feet (824 m). It is about 10 miles (16 km) east of La Grande, and 7 miles (11 km) northwest of Union.

The first Europeans to see Hot Lake were the 32 members of an expedition under W. Price Hunt, who entered the Grande Ronde Valley on January 1, 1812, on their way to the mouth of the Columbia River. On August 7 of that year, Robert Stuart made the first written notation of the place while returning from the Columbia River. Hot Lake became a resting place for travelers, especially when settlers began traversing through the valley on the Oregon Trail in the 1840s. The first hotel was built at Hot Lake in 1864 by Samuel F. Newhard, and a post office was established in 1883. In 1884, the railroad was built through the area. The Hot Lake Resort was built in 1906. The resort began to decline in the 1930s, as a result of the death of its director since 1917, Dr. W. T. Phy, a disastrous 1934 fire, and the Great Depression. The post office was discontinued in 1943. Hot Lake is now served by the La Grande post office.
