= 1918 Oregon gubernatorial election =

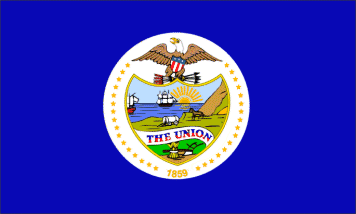
- November 5, 1918
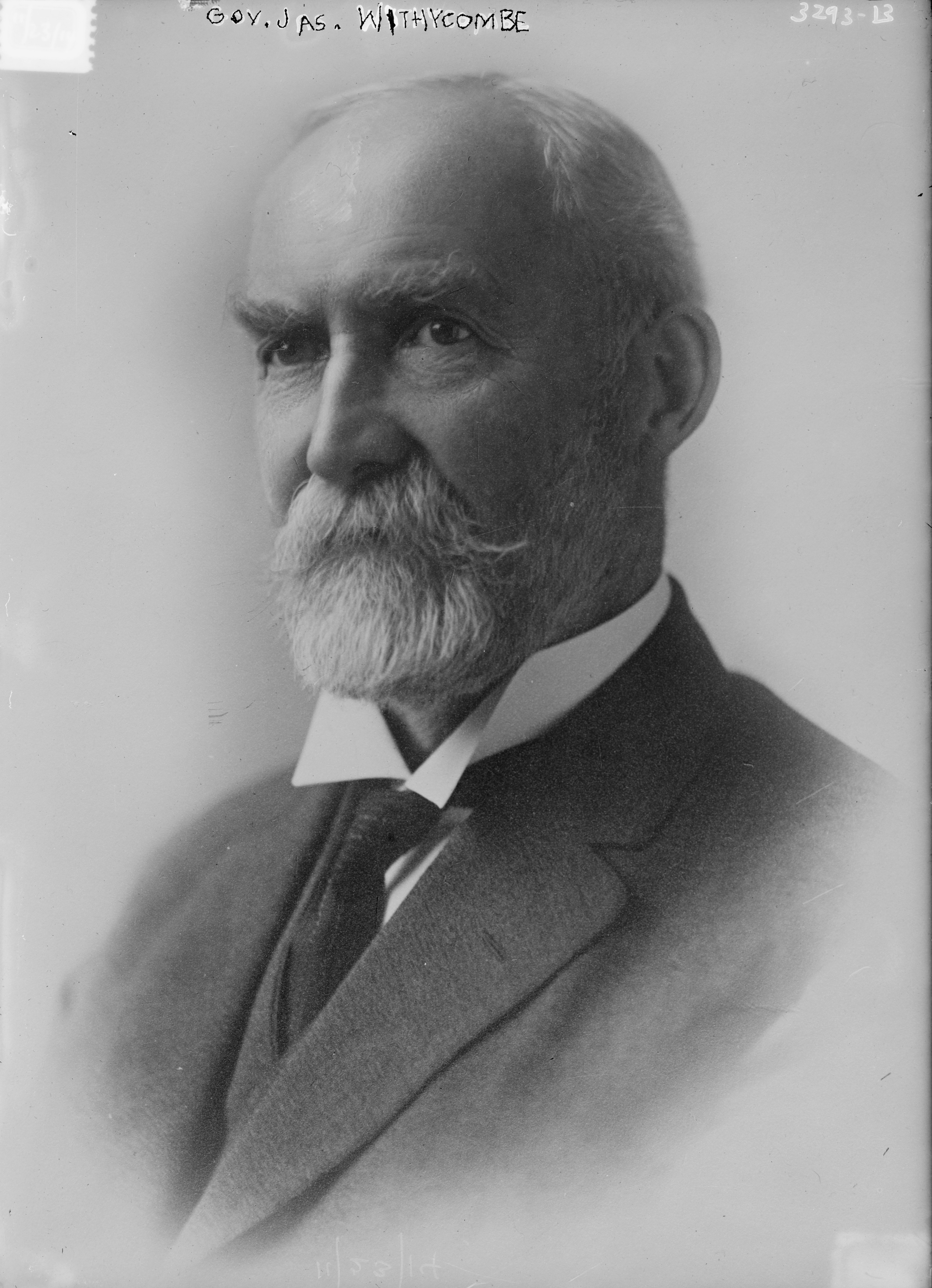

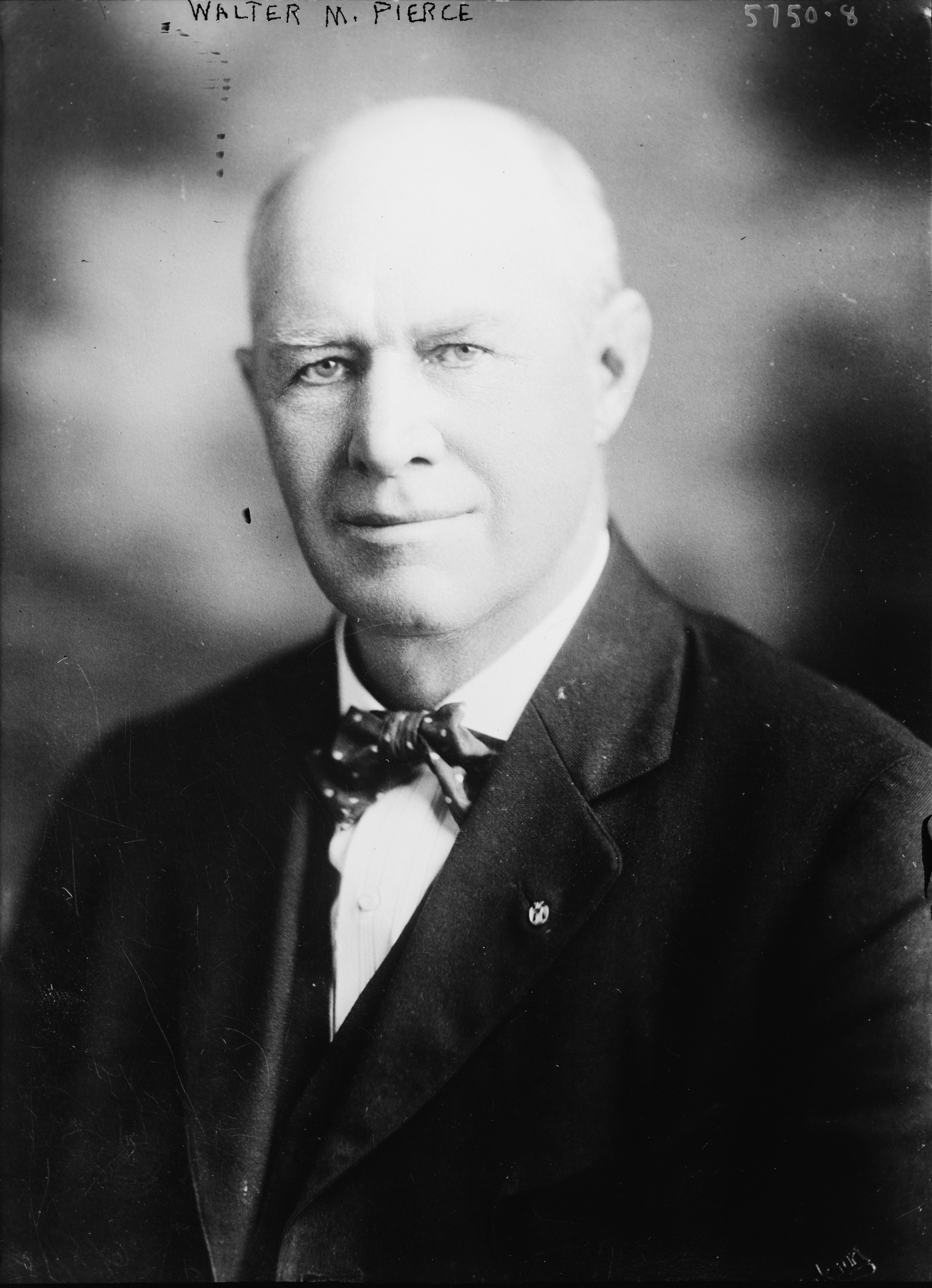
Nominee	James Withycombe	Walter M. Pierce
Party	Republican	Democratic
Popular vote	81,067	65,440
Percentage	52.99%	42.77%
- County results: Withycombe: 40–50% 50–60% 60–70% Pierce: 40–50% 50–60%
Governor before election
James Withycombe
Republican
Elected Governor
James Withycombe
Republican

The 1918 Oregon gubernatorial election took place on November 5, 1918, to elect the governor of the U.S. state of Oregon. The election matched incumbent Republican James Withycombe against Democratic State Senator Walter M. Pierce.

Withycombe's reelection campaign capitalized on his wartime acts, portraying him as a wartime Governor actively protecting the state and aiding the defense of the United States. Withycombe died in office in March 1919, just two months into his second term. As prescribed by Oregon law, Oregon Secretary of State Ben Olcott succeeded Withycombe in office.

== Primary election ==
Oregon held primary elections on May 17, 1918.

=== Republican party ===
Incumbent governor James Withycombe was renominated with a plurality of the vote.

==== Candidates ====
- J. E. Anderson, member of Oregon House of Representatives and Prohibition activist
- F. C. Harley, mayor of Astoria
- Gus C. Moser, member of Oregon State Senate
- Ben W. Olcott, Secretary of State of Oregon
- L. J. Simpson, businessman and founder of North Bend
- James Withycombe, incumbent governor

==== Results ====
Republican primary results
Party	Candidate	Votes	%
Republican	James Withycombe (inc.)	33,184	37.99%
Republican	Ben W. Olcott	19,204	21.99%
Republican	L. J. Simpson	15,746	18.03%
Republican	Gus C. Moser	9,095	10.41%
Republican	F. C. Harley	6,286	7.20%
Republican	J. E. Anderson	3,835	4.39%
Total votes		87,350	100.00%

=== Democratic party ===
State senator Walter M. Pierce defeated educator Harvey G. Starkweather for the Democratic nomination.

==== Candidates ====
- Walter M. Pierce, member of Oregon State Senate
- Harvey G. Starkweather, former superintendent of schools in Clackmas County and La Grande

==== Results ====
Democratic primary results
Party	Candidate	Votes	%
Democratic	Walter M. Pierce	11,145	63.88%
Democratic	Harvey G. Starkweather	6,303	36.12%
Total votes		17,448	100.00%

== General election ==
=== Candidates ===
- James Withycombe, Republican
- Walter M. Pierce, Democratic
- B. F. Ramp, Socialist

=== Results ===
1918 Oregon gubernatorial election
Party	Candidate	Votes	%	±%
Republican	James Withycombe (inc.)	81,067	52.99%	+4.19%
Democratic	Walter M. Pierce	65,440	42.77%	+4.64%
Socialist	B. F. Ramp	6,480	4.24%	−1.52%
Total votes		152,987	100.00%	
Majority		15,627	10.21%	
Republican hold		Swing	-0.45%	

=== Results by county ===
County	James Withycombe Republican		Walter M. Pierce Democratic		B. F. Ramp Socialist		Margin		Total votes cast
County	#	%	#	%	#	%	#	%	Total votes cast
Baker	2,147	54.20%	1,694	42.77%	120	3.03%	453	11.44%	3,961
Benton	1,917	61.80%	1,135	36.59%	50	1.61%	782	25.21%	3,102
Clackamas	3,674	48.12%	3,312	43.38%	649	8.50%	362	4.74%	7,635
Clatsop	2,125	63.15%	993	29.51%	247	7.34%	1,132	33.64%	3,365
Columbia	1,201	53.54%	933	41.60%	109	4.86%	268	11.95%	2,243
Coos	2,293	54.82%	1,604	38.35%	286	6.84%	689	16.47%	4,183
Crook	548	50.28%	517	47.43%	25	2.29%	31	2.84%	1,090
Curry	461	61.63%	224	29.95%	63	8.42%	237	31.68%	748
Deschutes	709	43.87%	838	51.86%	69	4.27%	-129	-7.98%	1,616
Douglas	2,414	56.10%	1,732	40.25%	157	3.65%	682	15.85%	4,303
Gilliam	563	62.49%	323	35.85%	15	1.66%	240	26.64%	901
Grant	765	60.67%	445	35.29%	51	4.04%	320	25.38%	1,261
Harney	342	39.77%	487	56.63%	31	3.60%	-145	-16.86%	860
Hood River	870	60.37%	524	36.36%	47	3.26%	346	24.01%	1,441
Jackson	2,554	49.77%	2,416	47.08%	162	3.16%	138	2.69%	5,132
Jefferson	419	51.10%	380	46.34%	21	2.56%	39	4.76%	820
Josephine	1,133	60.17%	680	36.11%	70	3.72%	453	24.06%	1,883
Klamath	1,165	60.65%	649	33.78%	107	5.57%	516	26.86%	1,921
Lake	499	56.26%	361	40.70%	27	3.04%	138	15.56%	887
Lane	4,666	61.46%	2,673	35.21%	253	3.33%	1,993	26.25%	7,592
Lincoln	757	53.57%	588	41.61%	68	4.81%	169	11.96%	1,413
Linn	3,120	48.11%	3,179	49.02%	186	2.87%	-59	-0.91%	6,485
Malheur	1,202	60.77%	710	35.89%	66	3.34%	492	24.87%	1,978
Marion	4,347	48.00%	4,376	48.32%	334	3.69%	-29	-0.32%	9,057
Morrow	734	65.42%	341	30.39%	47	4.19%	393	35.03%	1,122
Multnomah	24,350	49.72%	22,431	45.80%	2,196	4.48%	1,919	3.92%	48,977
Polk	1,990	51.86%	1,757	45.79%	90	2.35%	233	6.07%	3,837
Sherman	743	67.06%	354	31.95%	11	0.99%	389	35.11%	1,108
Tillamook	1,090	61.30%	598	33.63%	90	5.06%	492	27.67%	1,778
Umatilla	2,868	55.68%	2,128	41.31%	155	3.01%	740	14.37%	5,151
Union	1,482	46.49%	1,621	50.85%	85	2.67%	-139	-4.36%	3,188
Wallowa	777	51.02%	697	45.76%	49	3.22%	80	5.25%	1,523
Wasco	1,330	60.26%	801	36.29%	76	3.44%	529	23.97%	2,207
Washington	2,831	57.31%	1,796	36.36%	313	6.34%	1,035	20.95%	4,940
Wheeler	395	68.22%	177	30.57%	7	1.21%	218	37.65%	579
Yamhill	2,586	55.02%	1,966	41.83%	148	3.15%	620	13.19%	4,700
Total	81,067	52.99%	65,440	42.77%	6,480	4.24%	15,627	10.21%	152,987

==== Counties that flipped from Democratic to Republican ====
- Crook
- Curry
- Jackson

==== Counties that flipped from Republican to Democratic ====
- Harney
- Marion
- Union
