= Wheeler, Oregon =

Wheeler, Oregon may refer to:

- Wheeler, Tillamook County, Oregon, a city in the U.S. state of Oregon
- Wheeler, Wheeler County, Oregon, a former city in Wheeler County, Oregon
