= Seymour Jones =

American politician

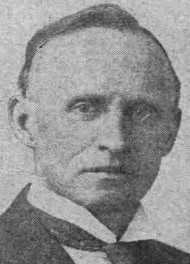

Speaker of the Oregon House of Representatives
- In office 1919–1921
- Preceded by: Robert N. Stanfield
- Succeeded by: Louis E. Bean

Member of the Oregon House of Representatives
- In office 1916–1921

Personal details
- Born: October 19, 1862 Springfield, Illinois, U.S.
- Died: March 13, 1951 (aged 88) Salem, Oregon, U.S.
- Party: Republican
- Profession: rancher, lawyer

Seymour Jones (October 19, 1862 – March 13, 1951) was an American politician who served in the Oregon House of Representatives. A state representative from Marion County from 1916 to 1921, he was chosen to serve as Speaker of that body from 1919 to 1921. Jones also served as Oregon's state marketing agent from 1927 to 1931.
