= I. L. Patterson =

18th Governor of Oregon

Isaac L. Patterson
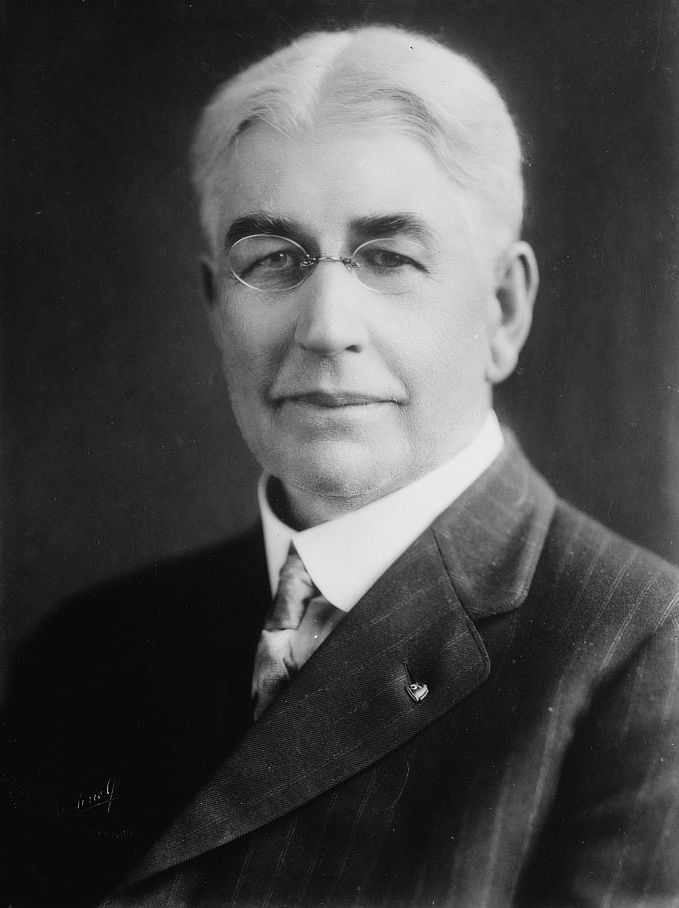

18th Governor of Oregon
- In office January 10, 1927 – December 21, 1929
- Preceded by: Walter Marcus Pierce
- Succeeded by: A. W. Norblad

Member of the Oregon Legislative Assembly
- In office 1918–1922

Personal details
- Born: September 17, 1859 Benton County, Oregon
- Died: December 21, 1929 (aged 70) Eola, Oregon
- Party: Republican
- Spouse: Mary Elizabeth Woodworth (m. 1886)
- Children: 2
- Profession: Merchant

Isaac Lee Patterson (September 17, 1859 – December 21, 1929) was the 18th governor of Oregon from 1927 to 1929. An Oregon native, he served in the Oregon Legislative Assembly from 1918 to 1922, and was a farmer in the Willamette Valley. He was the first governor of Oregon born in the state after it was admitted to the Union.

== Early life ==
Patterson was born on September 17, 1859, on his family's Kings Valley estate in rural Benton County, Oregon. His parents, Francis A. and Caroline (née Tatum) were emigrants to the Oregon Territory, having made the overland trip from their previous home of Bellevue, Illinois. Until he reached the age of 18, he worked his father's farm. He later attended Monmouth's Christian College, for one year. Patterson supported himself as a grocery clerk in Independence, later earning his way into a position there as a business partner. His participation in the grocery store lasted for 22 years. On May 12, 1886, he married Mary Elizabeth Woodworth, and they had two children.

== Entry into politics ==
In 1898, Patterson entered politics, gaining election to a seat in the Oregon State Senate representing Marion County. At the time, he was one of the youngest state legislators ever elected, having been sworn in at age 32. President William McKinley appointed Patterson to the post of Collector of Customs, Portland District in 1898, and he was reappointed by Theodore Roosevelt in 1902, serving there until 1906.

In 1899, Patterson sold off his share in the grocery store, and purchased a 300-acre (1.2 km^{2}) ranch in rural Polk County. The farm proved profitable, and it paved the way for Patterson's later venture into a successful wool and hide business in Portland.

After serving out his term as collector of customs, Patterson managed his business affairs and kept working politically inside the Republican Party. In 1918, the citizens of Benton and Polk Counties elected him to represent their district, returning him to the state senate. In the senate, he moved his way up and served as chairman of the Ways and Means Committee.

== Governorship ==
Patterson attempted to secure the Republican nomination for governor in 1922, coming in a distant third in the primary in a five-man race. Despite this poor showing, Patterson had strong ties with the party's old guard. He won the chairmanship of the Oregon State Republican Party Central Committee in 1924, going on to chair Calvin Coolidge's Presidential campaign in Oregon.

His profile statewide rose, and this secured him the Republican gubernatorial nomination in 1926. He went on to defeat Walter M. Pierce in that year's general election.

Using President Calvin Coolidge as an inspiration, Governor Patterson governed the state in a financially conservative manner; streamlining agencies of the state and vetoing legislation that threatened balancing the state's finances. By 1920, the state balanced its budget for the first time in its history. His administration continued improving state roads and highways, established the state's system of higher education, and directed the state prison system to house adult and juvenile criminals separately.

He was considered a popular and well-respected figure by rivals and supporters alike. He suddenly died in office of pneumonia on December 21, 1929, and was buried in Mount Crest Abbey Mausoleum in Salem. He was succeeded by fellow Republican senate president Albin Norblad Sr.

== Sources ==
- Klooster, Karl. Round the Roses II: More Past Portland Perspectives, pg. 126, 1992 ISBN 0-9619847-1-6

Political offices
Preceded by Walter M. Pierce	Governor of Oregon; 1927–1929	Succeeded by A. W. Norblad
Party political offices
Preceded by Ben W. Olcott	Republican nominee for Governor of Oregon; 1926	Succeeded by George W. Joseph
