= Louis E. Bean =

American politician

29th Speaker of the Oregon House of Representatives
- In office January 10, 1921 – January 8, 1923
- Preceded by: Seymour Jones
- Succeeded by: Kaspar K. Kubli

Member of the Oregon House of Representatives
- In office January 11, 1909 – January 9, 1911
- In office January 8, 1917 – January 8, 1923

Member of the Oregon State Senate
- In office January 9, 1911 – January 11, 1915

Personal details
- Born: November 21, 1867 Lane County, Oregon, US
- Died: July 6, 1929 (aged 61) Marion County, Oregon, US
- Party: Republican

Louis Elmer Bean (November 21, 1867 - July 6, 1929) was an American politician who served in the Oregon State Senate between 1911 and 1915, and the Oregon House of Representatives between 1909 and 1911, and again between 1917 and 1923, where he served as speaker of between 1921 and 1923.

== First Oregon House of Representatives Stint (1909-1911) ==
Bean was elected to the Oregon House of Representatives in 1908 as a Republican from Lane County. His term began on January 11, 1909. He represented the 3rd district. He left the House when his term ended to be a state senator.

== Oregon State Senate (1911-1915) ==
Bean was elected to the Oregon State Senate in 1910, as a Republican from Lane County. His term began on January 9, 1911. He represented the 4th district. He left the Senate at the end of the 27th legislature.

== Second Oregon House of Representatives Stint (1917-1923) ==
Bean was elected again to the Oregon House of Representatives in 1916. His term began on January 8, 1917. He served three terms in a row. During his final term, he was elected speaker of the Oregon House of Representatives. During his final term, he also was redistricted into the 2nd district.
