= Walter M. Pierce =

17th Governor of Oregon

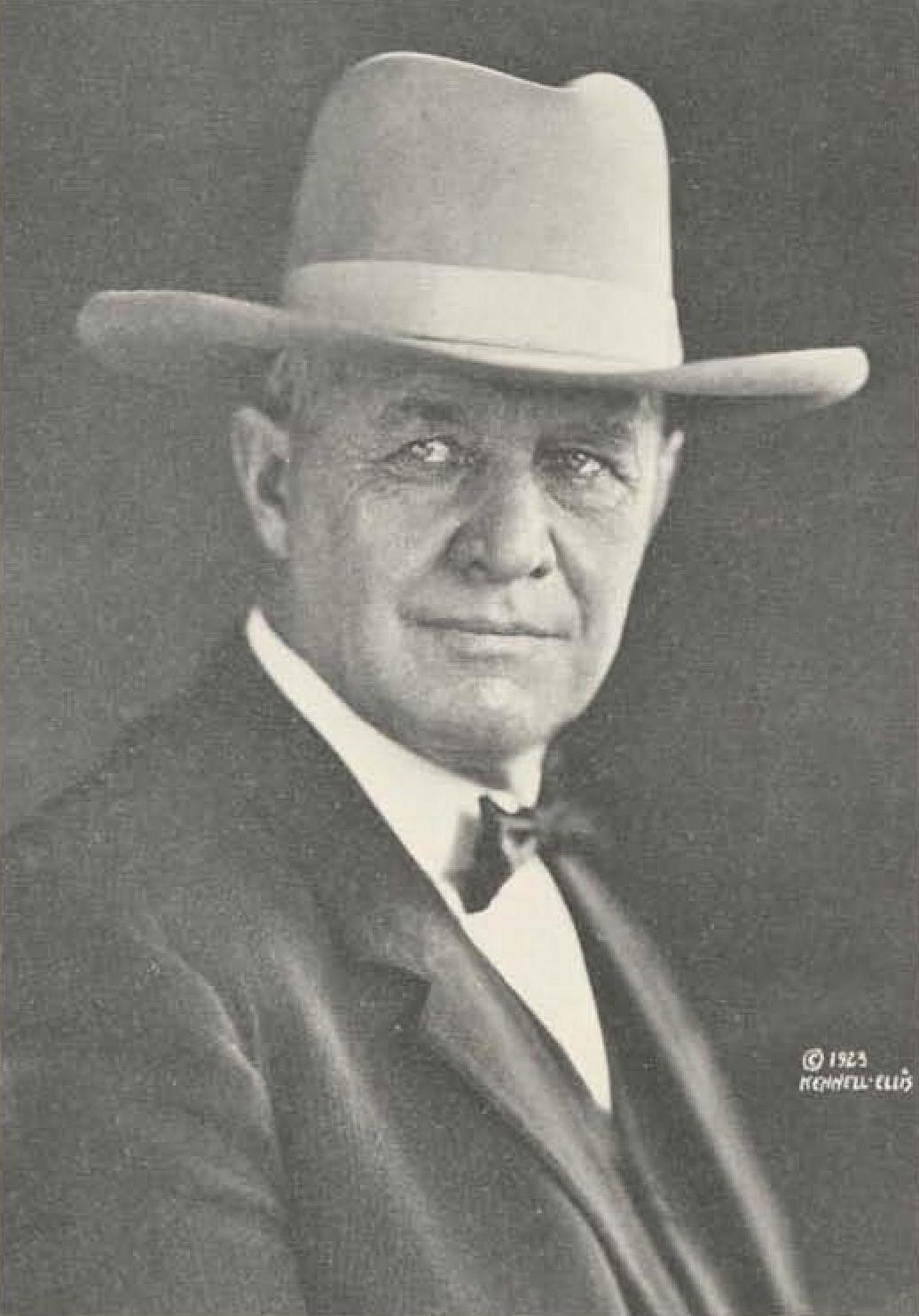

17th Governor of Oregon
- In office January 8, 1923 – January 10, 1927
- Preceded by: Ben W. Olcott
- Succeeded by: I. L. Patterson

Member of the U.S. House of Representatives from Oregon's 2nd district
- In office March 4, 1933 – January 3, 1943
- Preceded by: Robert R. Butler
- Succeeded by: Lowell Stockman

Member of the Oregon State Senate
- In office 1917–1921
- In office 1903–1907

Personal details
- Born: Walter Marcus Pierce; May 30, 1861 Morris, Illinois, U.S.
- Died: March 27, 1954 (aged 92) Salem, Oregon, U.S.
- Resting place: Mount Crest Abbey Mausoleum
- Party: Democratic
- Spouse(s): Clara Rudio Pierce (died, 1890); Laura Rudio Pierce (died, 1925); Cornelia Marvin Pierce
- Education: Northwestern University (LLB)
- Profession: Lawyer

Walter Marcus Pierce (May 30, 1861 – March 27, 1954) was an American politician, a Democrat, who served as the 17th governor of Oregon and a member of the United States House of Representatives from Oregon's 2nd congressional district. A native of Illinois, he served in the Oregon State Senate before the governorship, and again after leaving the U.S. House. Pierce was an anti-Catholic supporter of compulsory public education and signed a law banning parochial schools, resulting in lawsuits and the United States Supreme Court case of Pierce v. Society of Sisters. He was also a eugenicist and supported Prohibition. He advocated unsuccessfully for a state income tax and vehicle license fee.

== Early life ==
Pierce was born to Charles M. and Charlotte L. (née Clapp) Pierce, Jacksonian Democrat farmers in Morris, Illinois on May 30, 1861. At the age of 17, he began teaching school despite having only a secondary education.

In 1883, motivated by both his recent diagnosis of tuberculosis and the idea of Manifest Destiny as propounded by Horace Greeley, Pierce moved west. After arriving in Portland, Oregon in June 1883, he was not able to find work. After a period during which he worked the wheat fields of Walla Walla, Washington, he earned enough money to settle in Milton, Oregon in Umatilla County. There he returned to a career in education and established a successful farm.

As an educator, Pierce was drawn into local politics. He became well known for his pro-temperance views, and regularly spoke out against saloons selling alcohol to his students. In 1887, he married one of his students, Clara R. Rudio, who died during childbirth only three years later. The child was named after her mother. He married Clara's sister Laura in 1893. They had five children: Loyd, Lucile, Helen, Edith and Lorraine. Laura died of cancer in 1925. Pierce's third wife was Cornelia Marvin, the Oregon State Librarian, whom he married in 1928.

From 1886 until 1890, Pierce served as superintendent of Umatilla County public schools. From 1890 until 1894, he served as Umatilla county clerk, and earned enough money from land transactions to further his education. He then returned to Illinois with his family to attend Northwestern University, earning his Bachelor of Laws degree in 1896.

== Early political career ==
After graduation, the Pierce family returned to Oregon, where Walter set up a successful law firm in Pendleton. From 1896 to 1906, he managed a power company, speculated in land, and became one of the state's most renowned Hereford cattle breeders. He was again elected county clerk and served 1899 to 1903.

Pierce won a seat in the Oregon State Senate in 1902. In his first term, he failed to win passage of prohibition legislation, while winning passage of a state subsidy of $6 per child for education. He was defeated at the polls for reelection, and retired from politics for a decade beginning in 1906.

While out of politics, Pierce continued local and statewide activities. He was a founder of the Oregon Farmer's Union and the Public Power League, headed the State Taxpayers League, and took a seat on the board of Regents of Oregon Agricultural College from 1905 to 1927. He began advocating for using the Columbia River for hydroelectric power during this time. Pierce was also the promoter of the Hot Lake Sanatorium Company in Union County. He and fellow owner Parish L. Willis were accused of fraud by another investor, but cleared by the courts of any wrongdoing in 1918. The former sanatorium is now the Hot Lake Hotel and is listed on the National Register of Historic Places.

=== Unsuccessful campaigns for Senate and governor ===
Pierce won the Democratic nomination for the United States Senate in 1912, but lost to Harry Lane in the general election. In 1916, he was once again elected to the state Senate. In 1918, Pierce ran, unsuccessfully, as a progressive Democrat against incumbent Governor James Withycombe. In the next election, in 1920, he lost his Senate seat by twenty-seven votes.

== Governorship ==
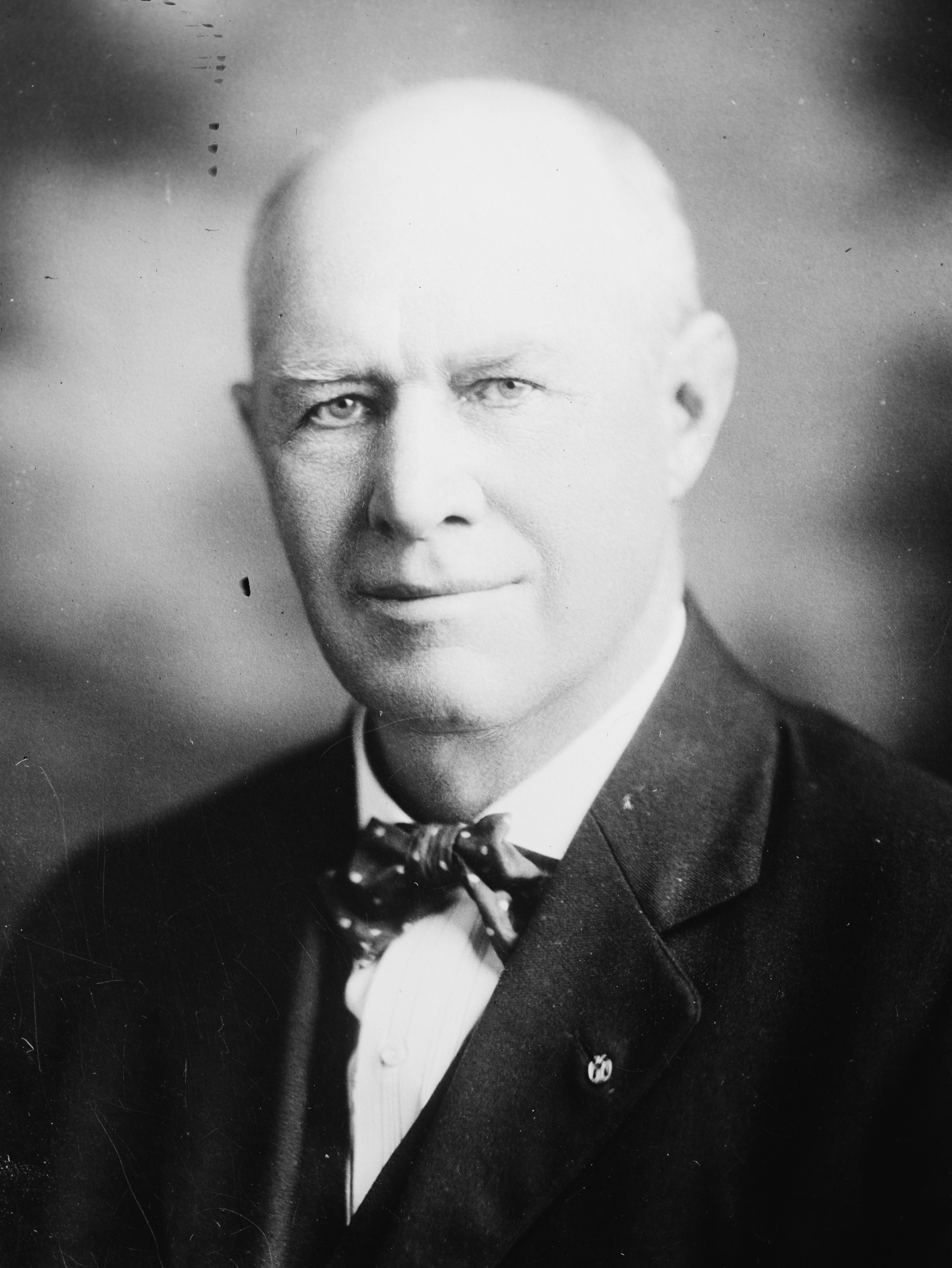
Walter M. Pierce between 1920 and 1925

Much of Pierce’s policies were rooted in racism, including supporting eugenics. He also supported birth control and Prohibition. In 1922, Pierce ran a successful campaign for governor against incumbent Ben W. Olcott. At the time, the Ku Klux Klan was growing in influence and power across the state and had drafted the overtly anti-Catholic and anti-semitic Compulsory School Act, a bill to require all school-age children to attend public schools. Governor Olcott defiantly refused to work with the Klan in any way. Pierce tacitly accepted the Klan's endorsement and lent his support to the school bill.

As governor, Pierce was at odds with a Republican-dominated legislature. His administration was able to continue the road-building policies of the previous two administrations, but could not win passage of a state income tax or assessed value license fees for automobiles. He attempted to gain support from progressive Republicans on issues of prison reform, reforestation, and hydroelectric development, but he divided the state Democratic Party by endorsing Robert M. La Follette for President in 1924. The Ku Klux Klan, which had endorsed him only a few years earlier, began an unsuccessful recall effort.

In the 1926 elections, Republican I. L. Patterson defeated Pierce. Upon leaving the Governor's office, Pierce returned to his ranch in La Grande, Oregon.

The Compulsory Education Act was later struck down by the Supreme Court of the United States in its 1925 Pierce v. Society of Sisters decision, on the grounds that it violated the Fourteenth Amendment to the United States Constitution.

== Member of the U.S. House of Representatives ==
In 1928, Pierce ran unsuccessfully for the 2nd Congressional District seat. He declined to run for governor in 1930, but tried once more for Congress in 1932. He was elected amid excitement over the landslide presidential election victory of Franklin D. Roosevelt. Pierce would become a staunch supporter of Roosevelt's New Deal, serving in Congress until his defeat in 1942.

Pierce joined the majority of his party in opposing anti-lynching legislation in 1940.

One of the oldest politicians in Oregon history, Pierce retired from politics at age 81. He and his wife Cornelia retired to Eola, Oregon. Pierce and his wife both became involved in the anti-Japanese movement during World War II, in response to a concern on the part of local residents about the success of Japanese truckers in certain areas of Oregon.

=== Death and legacy ===
Pierce died on March 27, 1954, near Salem, Oregon, at the age of 92 and was interred at the Mount Crest Abbey Mausoleum in Salem. His third wife Cornelia died on February 12, 1957. Eastern Oregon University named its library after him and Cornelia, but removed the name Pierce from the library in November 2020 due to the governor's views on race.

== Footnotes ==
Political offices
| Preceded by Ben W. Olcott | Governor of Oregon; 1923–1927 | Succeeded by I. L. Patterson |
U.S. House of Representatives
| Preceded by Robert R. Butler | U.S. Representative of Oregon's 2nd congressional district 1933–1943 | Succeeded by Lowell Stockman |
Party political offices
| Preceded by C. J. Smith | Democratic nominee for Governor of Oregon; 1918, 1922, 1926 | Succeeded by Edward F. Bailey |
Honorary titles
| Preceded by Schuyler Merritt | Oldest member of the U.S. House of Representatives; 1937–1939 | Succeeded by George P. Darrow |
| Preceded by George P. Darrow | Oldest member of the U.S. House of Representatives; 1941–1943 | Succeeded by Robert L. Doughton |
