= F. W. Benson =

F. W. Benson may refer to:

- Frank W. Benson (politician) (1858–1911), governor of Oregon
- Frank Weston Benson (1862–1951), American artist
