= Sam A. Kozer =

American politician (1871–1935)

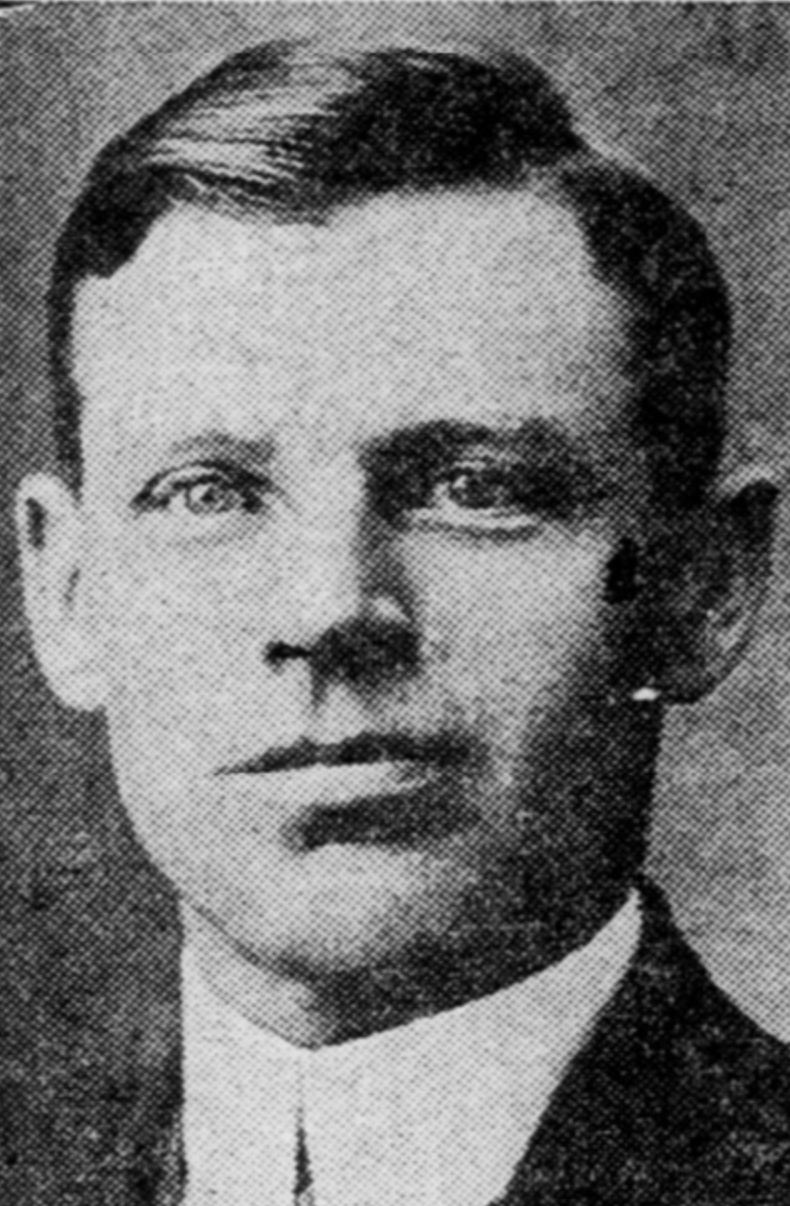

10th Oregon Secretary of State
- In office May 28, 1920 – September 24, 1928
- Governor: Ben W. Olcott; Walter M. Pierce; I. L. Patterson
- Preceded by: Ben W. Olcott
- Succeeded by: Hal E. Hoss

1^{st} Oregon Budget Director
- In office 1928–1931

1^{st} Oregon Deputy Secretary of State
- In office April 17, 1911 – May 28, 1920

1^{st} Oregon Insurance Commissioner
- In office 1909–1911

Personal details
- Born: October 19, 1871; Steelton, Pennsylvania, U.S.
- Died: October 12, 1935 (aged 63); Portland, Oregon, U.S.
- Political party: Republican
- Spouse: Nannie Belcher
- Occupation: Clerk

Sam A. Kozer (October 19, 1871 – October 12, 1935) was an American politician who served as Oregon's Secretary of State from 1920 to 1928. He was a member of the Republican Party. Kozer also served as the Oregon's first Insurance Commissioner (1909–1911), Deputy Secretary of State (1911–1920), and Budget Director (1928–1931).

== Early life ==
Sam A. Kozer was born in Steelton, Pennsylvania, to George M. and Cathrine Kozer. He graduated high school in 1888. For money, Kozer would sell local news papers and do odd jobs. He remained in Pennsylvania through his late teen years working of the Pennsylvania Steel Company. After 18 months with the company, he was promoted to the chemical laboratory.

At the age of 19, Kozer moved to Oregon where he proceeded to work odd jobs. His first two jobs were working on a farm and in a hotel in Gearhart, Oregon. On February 1, 1890, Kozer was hired as clerk in the Clatsop County recorder's office. Over the next eight years, Kozer worked at multiple other offices in Clatsop County. In 1896, Kozer married Nannie Belcher of Astoria, Oregon. In 1898, Frank Dunbar, Kozer's boss in the recorder's office, was elected as Secretary of State of Oregon. Kozer was named chief clerk of Dunbar's office.

== Political career ==
In 1909, Kozer was appointed to the position of Insurance Commissioner by Governor Frank W. Benson, making him the first person in Oregon to hold that office. Kozer's salary was US$3,000 a year. He was named the Oregon's first Deputy Secretary of State in 1911. He served under Ben W. Olcott in that position.

On May 28, 1920, Kozer was appointed to the position of Secretary of State. He resigned that position on September 24, 1928.

== Later life ==
After his resignation from the office of Secretary of State, Kozer was named Oregon's Budget Director. Kozer was the head of the auditing department of the state board of higher education. He died on October 12, 1935, in Portland, Oregon.

Political offices
Preceded by Ben W. Olcott	Secretary of State of Oregon; 1920–1928	Succeeded by Hal E. Hoss
