= Kozer =

Kozer is a surname. Notable people with the surname include:

- Sam A. Kozer (1871–1935), American politician
- Sarah Kozer (born 1973), American actress and model
