= Colonel William Thompson =

Colonel William Thompson may refer to:

- William Thompson (journalist) (1848–1934), fought Indians in Oregon and California and edited the Alturas Plaindealer
- William Thompson (general) (1736–1781), served in the American Revolutionary War
