= Thomas A. McBride =

American judge (1847–1930)

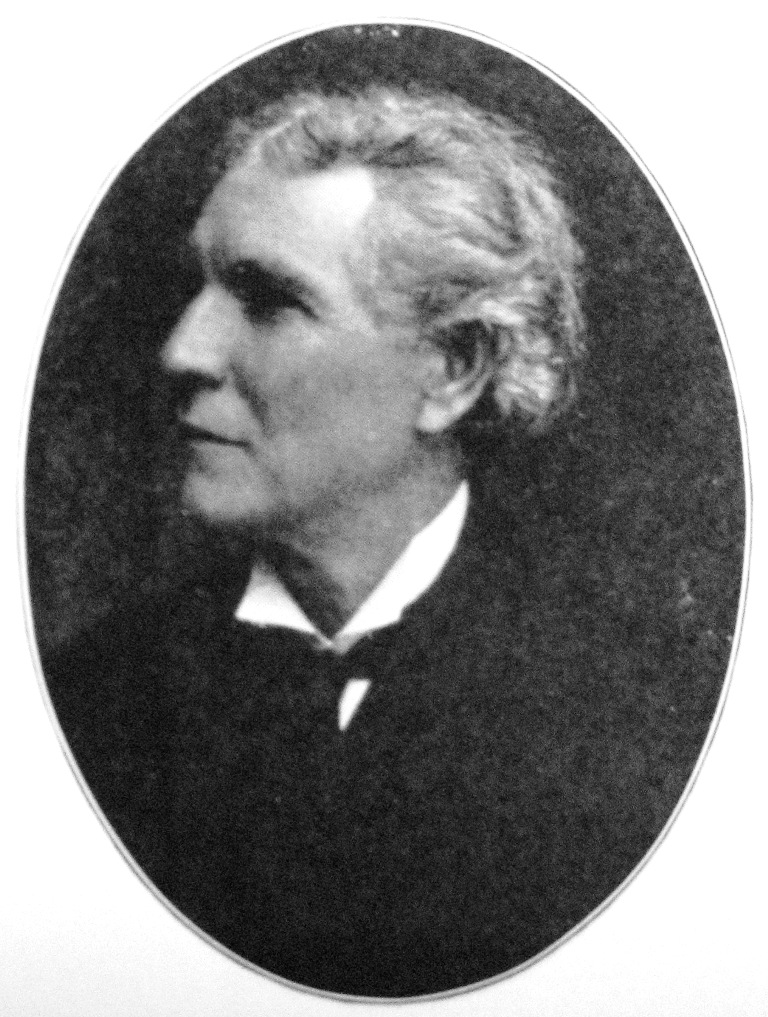
- McBride circa 1910

20th Chief Justice of the Oregon Supreme Court
- In office 1913–1915, 1917 – 1921, 1923–1927
- Preceded by: Robert Eakin, Frank A. Moore, George H. Burnett
- Succeeded by: Frank A. Moore, George H. Burnett

39th Justice of the Oregon Supreme Court
- In office 1909–1930
- Appointed by: Frank W. Benson
- Preceded by: Robert S. Bean
- Succeeded by: Percy R. Kelly

Personal details
- Born: November 15, 1847 Yamhill County, Oregon
- Died: September 9, 1930 (aged 82)
- Spouse(s): Mary E. Merrill, Mrs. Lottie May Chappell

Thomas Allen McBride (November 15, 1847 – September 9, 1930) was an American attorney and judge in Oregon. He was the 20th Chief Justice on the Oregon Supreme Court serving three times as chief between 1913 and 1927. Overall he served on Oregon’s highest court from 1909 till his death in 1930.

== Early life ==
McBride was born on November 15, 1847, in Yamhill County, Oregon, near Lafayette, Oregon. He was one of fourteen children Doctor James McBride and his wife Mahala Miller had together. One of Thomas’ younger brothers George W. McBride served as a United States senator, while an older brother John R. McBride served in the house and as Idaho’s territorial chief justice. Thomas attended school in Vancouver, Washington, where he also read law, and then spent some time at what is now Linfield College. He was then admitted to the bar on October 6, 1870.

Thomas then practiced law in Lafayette, Oregon City, and then St. Helens from 1872 to 1877. In 1876, he was elected to the Oregon House of Representatives as a Republican from Columbia County. In 1877, he moved to Salt Lake City, Utah, where he lived until 1880. He then returned to Oregon and practiced at Oregon City before becoming the district attorney (DA) for Clatsop County. He served as the DA until 1892.

== Judicial career ==
In 1892, McBride became Clatsop County Circuit Court judge, serving until 1909. While serving on the court he sentenced two people to death by hanging, including the first legal hanging in Clatsop County, Oregon, on December 1, 1893.

On May 1, 1909, Oregon Governor Frank W. Benson appointed McBride to the state supreme court to fill the vacancy created when justice Robert S. Bean resigned. McBride then won a full six year-term in the 1914 election. He was re-elected in 1920 and again in 1926. During his time on the bench he was chief justice of the court from 1913 to 1915, 1917 to 1921, and then from 1923 to 1927. Justice Thomas McBride died in office on September 9, 1930.

== Family ==
McBride first married on February 7, 1874, to Mary E. Merrill of Columbia County, Oregon. They had two children together. Then in 1927 he married Lottie May Chappell.
