= Eugene Daily News =

- Type: Digital
- Owner(s): Kelly Asay and Jeff Tunnell
- Founded: 2011
- Headquarters: Eugene, Oregon
- Website: eugenedailynews.com

The Eugene Daily News is a web site founded by Kelly Asay and Jeff Tunnell in 2011. It covers news, crime, events and culture for the Eugene area in the U.S. state of Oregon.

The two founders had no background in journalism, and believed their technology experience would help them avoid problems other news outlets had encountered. Serving as publisher, Asay was the only full-time employee as of 2011; according to Nieman Labs, as of 2015, the annual revenue was less than $50,000.

The 2017 book Media Control: News as an Institution of Power and Social Control cited the Daily News among several examples of local news outlets regularly publishing local mug shots with minimal context or follow-up reporting, a practice it labeled "media shaming".

Commentary by publisher Asay has been quoted by the Register Guard, another Eugene newspaper, and The Oregonian has picked up stories the News has covered.

A different newspaper used the same name from 1931 to 1942. It was also known as the Eugene Morning News and Eugene News.
