= Oregon Secretary of State =

Elected constitutional officer

Secretary of State of Oregon
- Great Seal of the State of Oregon

- Incumbent; Tobias Read since January 6, 2025
- Term length: 4 years, limited to 8 years in a 12-year period
- Inaugural holder: Lucien Heath
- Formation: 1859 (Oregon Constitution)
- Succession: First
- Website: sos.oregon.gov/Pages/index.aspx

The secretary of state of Oregon, an elected constitutional officer within the executive branch of the government of the U.S. state of Oregon, is first in the line of succession to the governor. The duties of the office are auditor of public accounts, chief elections officer, and administrator of public records. Additionally, the secretary of state serves on the Oregon State Land Board and chairs the Oregon Sustainability Board. Following every United States Census, if the Oregon Legislative Assembly cannot come to an agreement over changes to legislative redistricting, the duty falls to the secretary of state.

The current secretary of state is Democrat Tobias Read, who took office on January 6, 2025.

== Divisions ==
- Archives Division maintains the official records of the Oregon government, provides public access to them, and publishes the Oregon Blue Book and the Oregon Administrative Rules. Established in 1947, the division is located in the Cecil L. Edwards Archives Building in downtown Salem on the capitol mall.
- Audits Division provides oversight of public spending. The department began in 1929 and oversees state agency compliance with accounting rules, reports on the performance of state departments, and oversees the standards for audits of local governments within Oregon, among other tasks.
- Corporation Division handles filings relating to company law, including the formation of corporations and other businesses and organizations, and other matters related to the Uniform Commercial Code. They are also in charge of operating the notaries public system.
- Elections Division performs administrative and oversight duties concerning elections in concert with the County governments, maintains a central voter registry, and publishes the Voters' Pamphlet. These duties include working with the referendum, initiative, and recall process and accepting the registration of candidates for elective office.
- Executive Division oversees the other four divisions of the office. The Secretary of State's office is located in the Oregon State Capitol in Salem.

== List of Oregon secretaries of state ==
=== Provisional government (1841–1849) ===
Five individuals served as clerk and recorder, the predecessor office to the secretary of state:

- George W. LeBreton, February 18, 1841 – March 4, 1844
- Overton Johnson, March 4, 1844 – May 25, 1844
- John E. Long, May 25, 1844 – June 21, 1846
- Frederick Prigg, June 26, 1846 – September 16, 1848
- Samuel M. Holderness, September 19, 1848 – March 10, 1849

=== Territorial government (1849–1859) ===
Oregon's first territorial secretary was elected by the legislature, to serve until a successor could be appointed by the President of the United States.

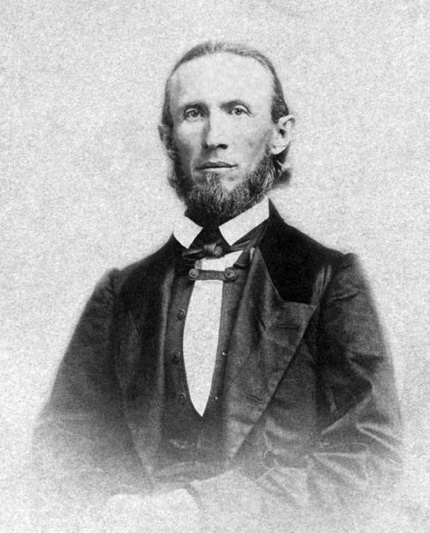
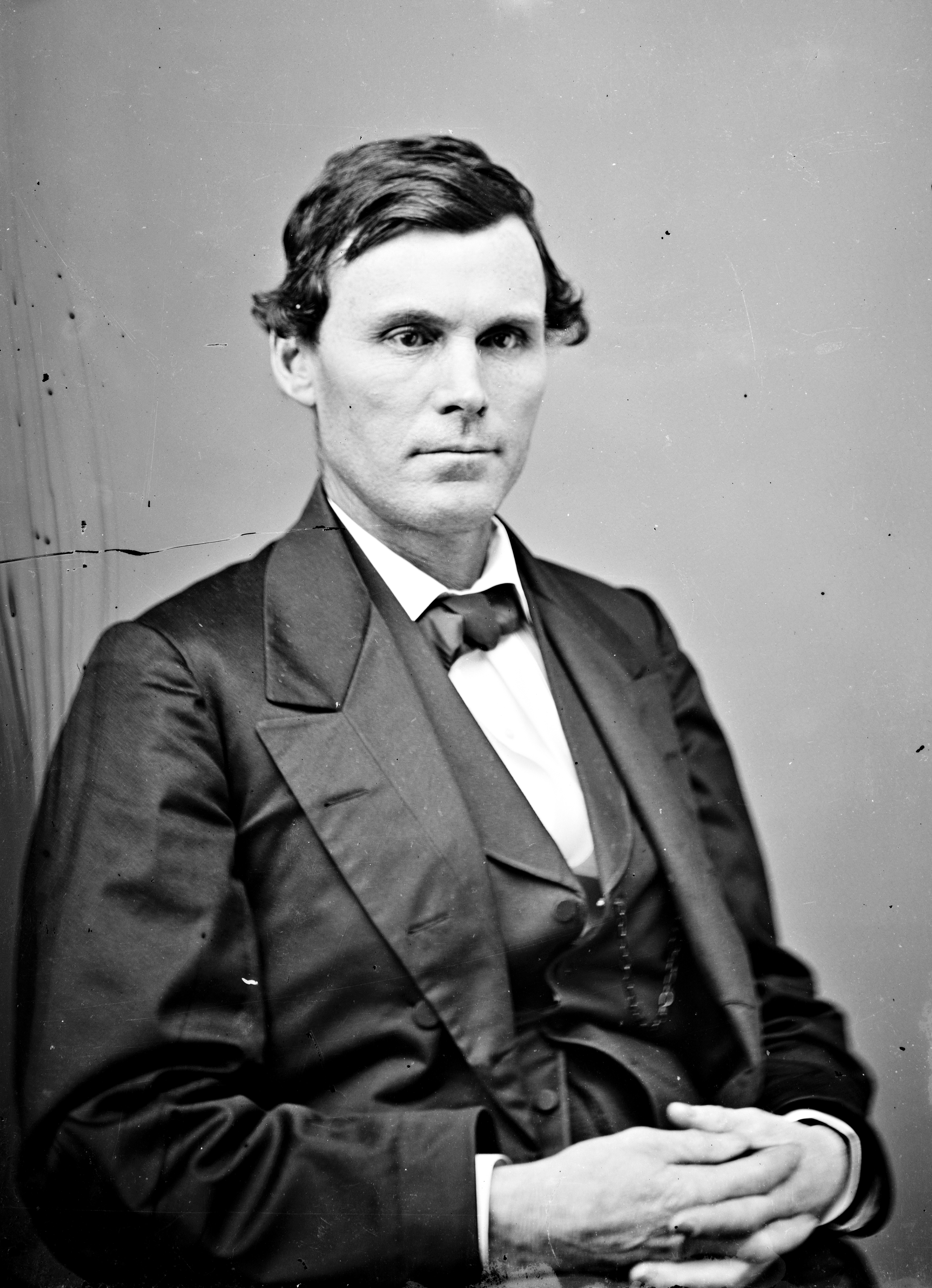
#	Image	Name	Party	Term
1		Theophilus R. Magruder	Whig	March 10, 1849 – April 9, 1849
2		Kintzing Prichette	Democratic	April 9, 1849 – September 18, 1850
3		Edward D. Hamilton	Whig	September 18, 1850 – May 14, 1853
4		George L. Curry	Democratic	May 14, 1853 – January 27, 1855
5		Benjamin Harding	Democratic	January 27, 1855 – March 3, 1859

=== State government (1859–present) ===
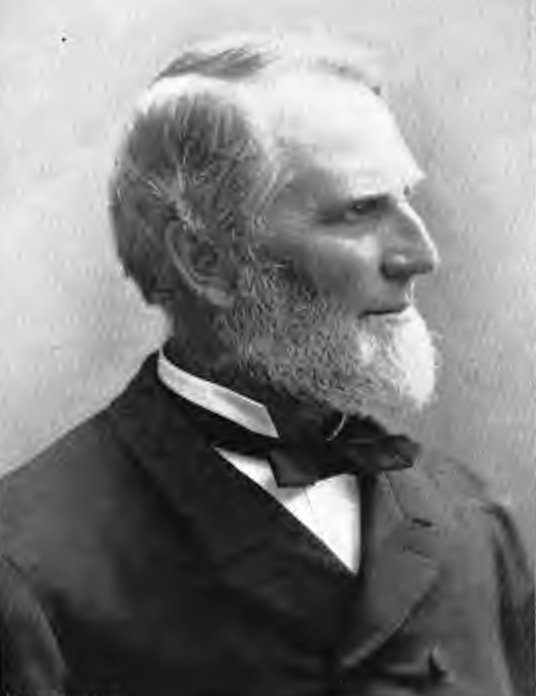
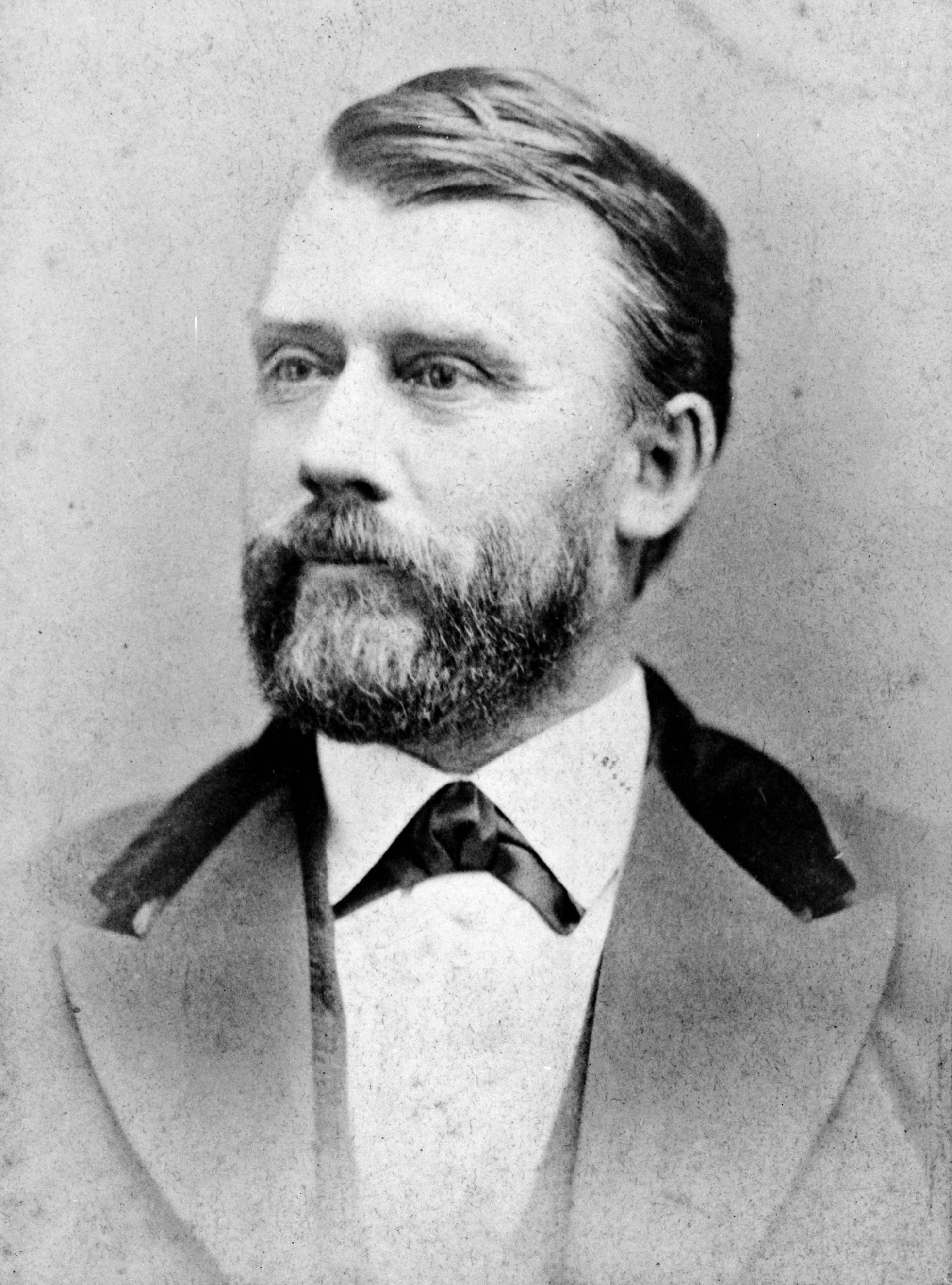
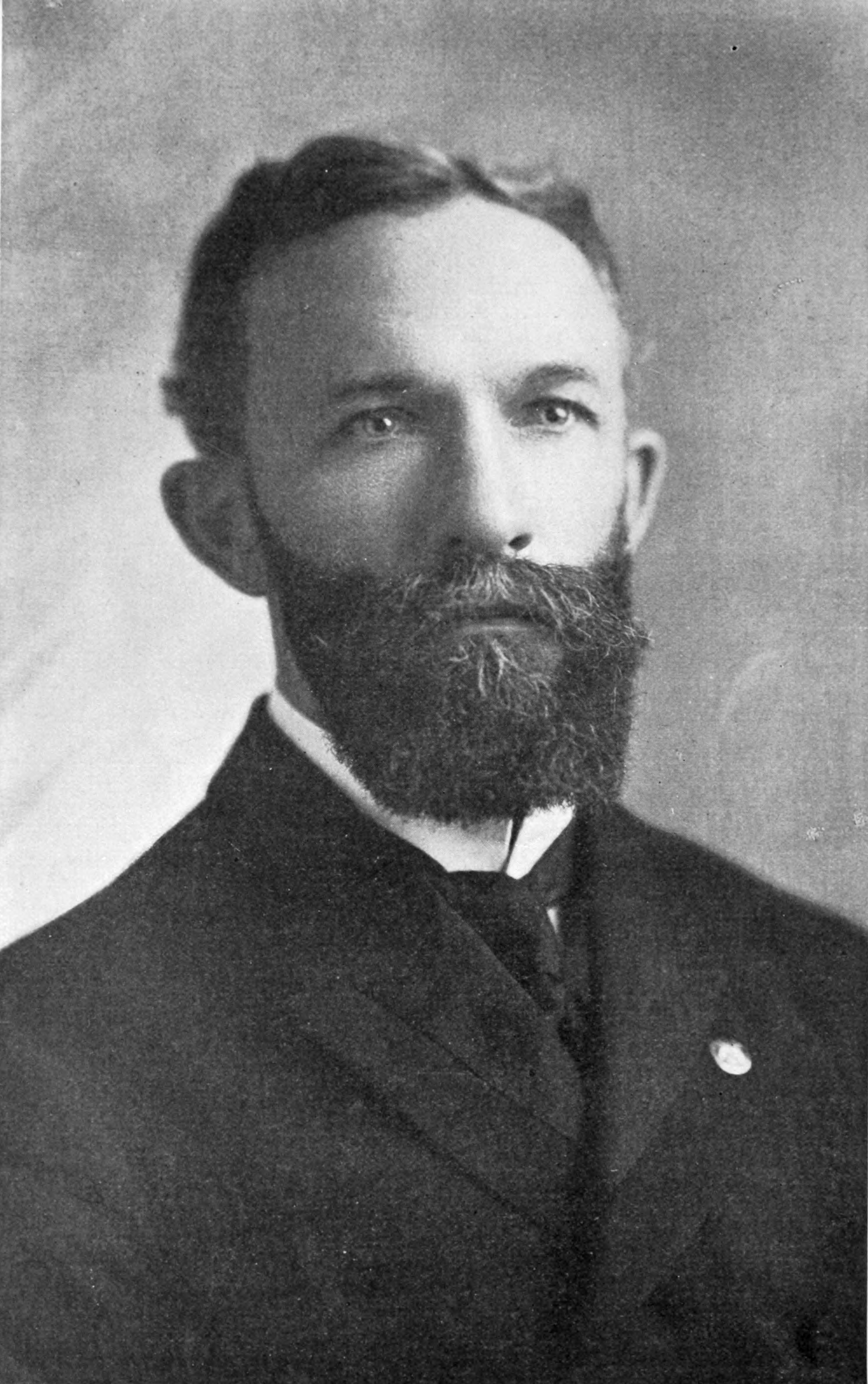
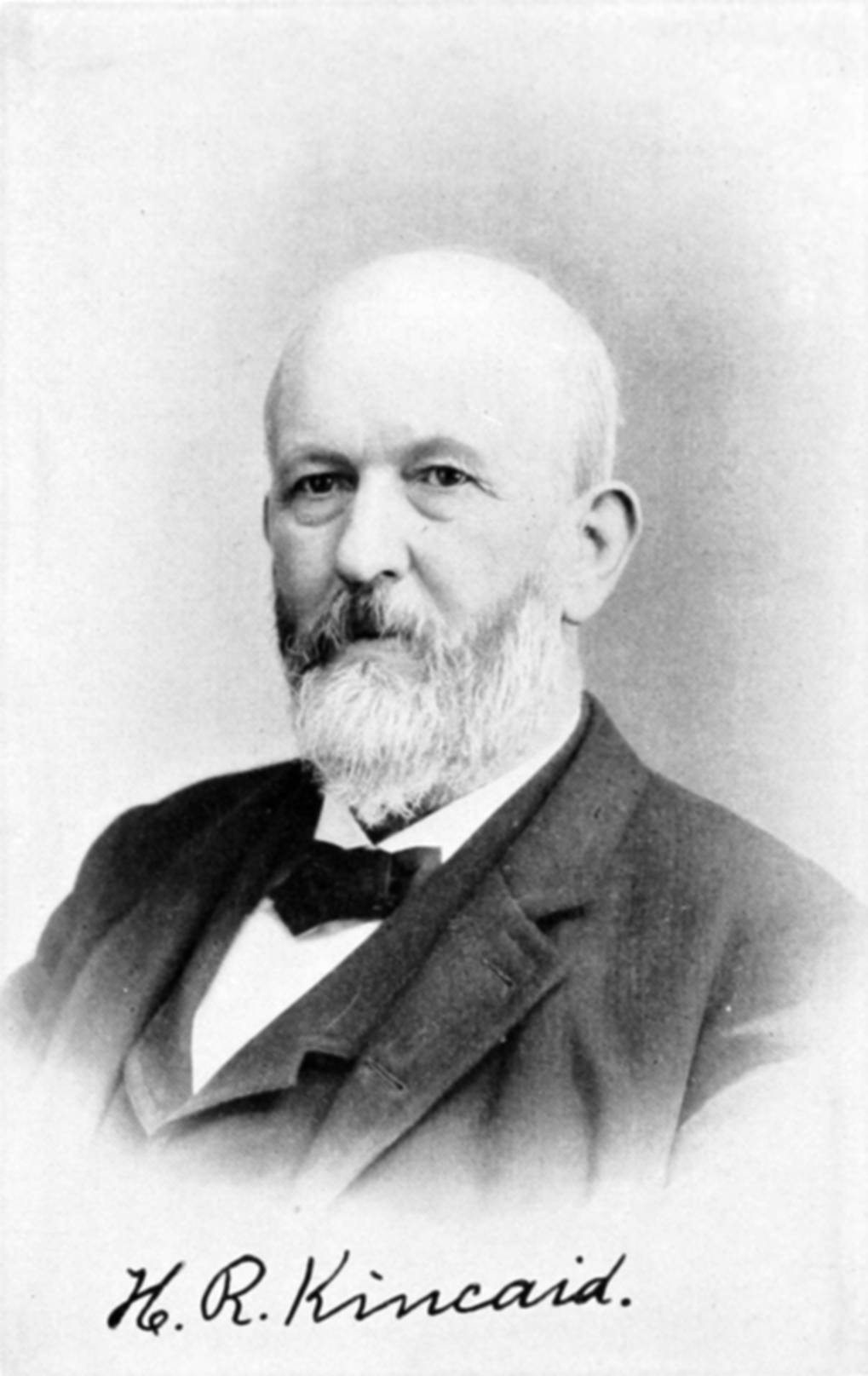
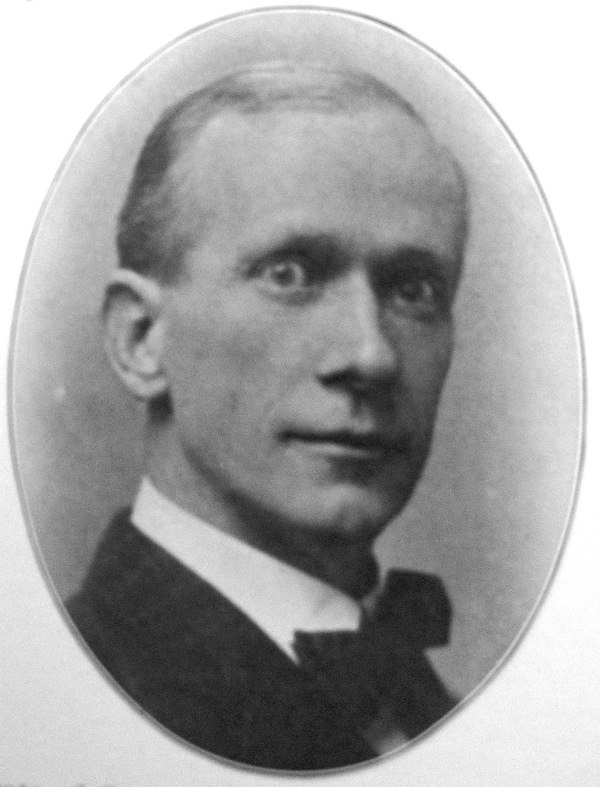
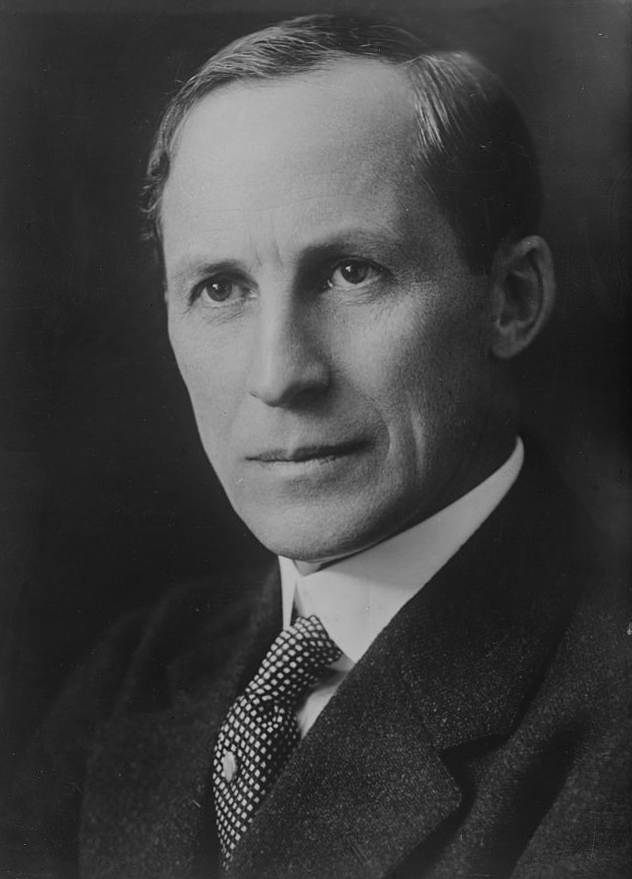
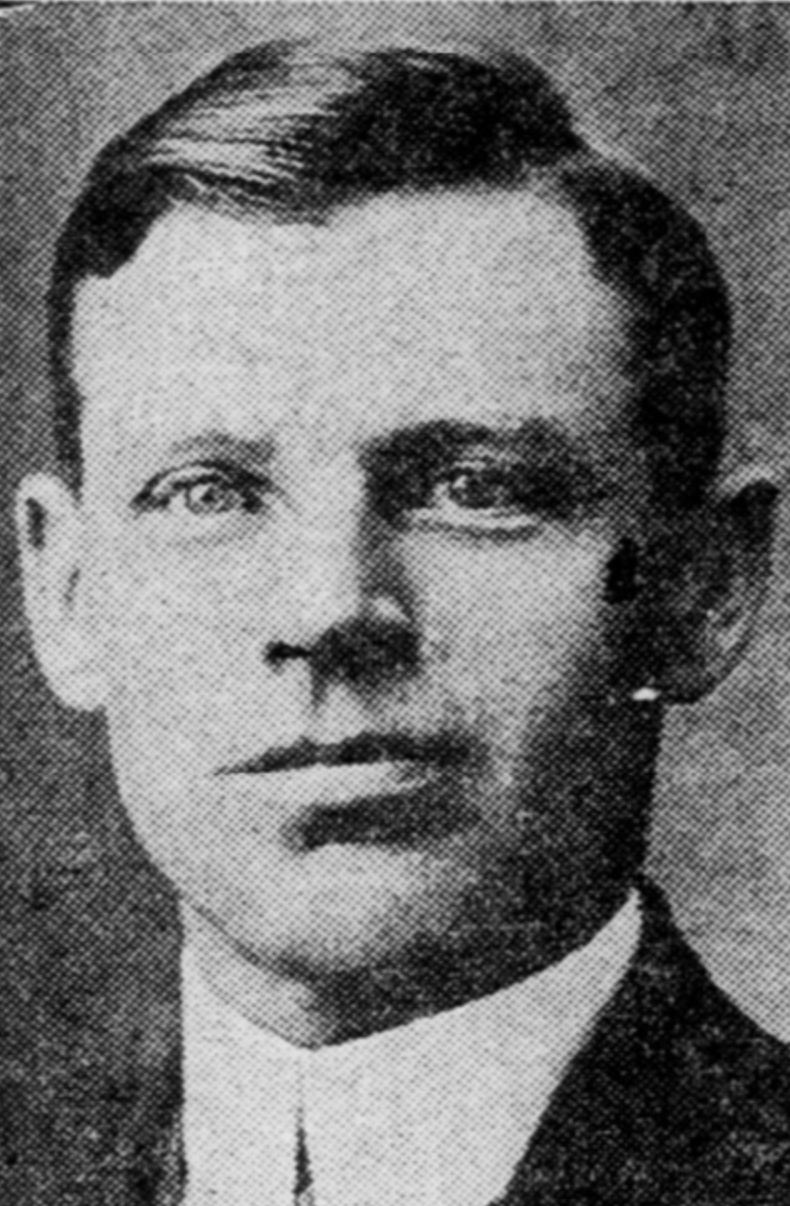
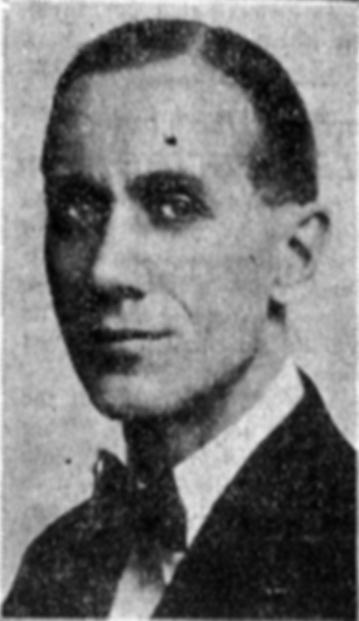
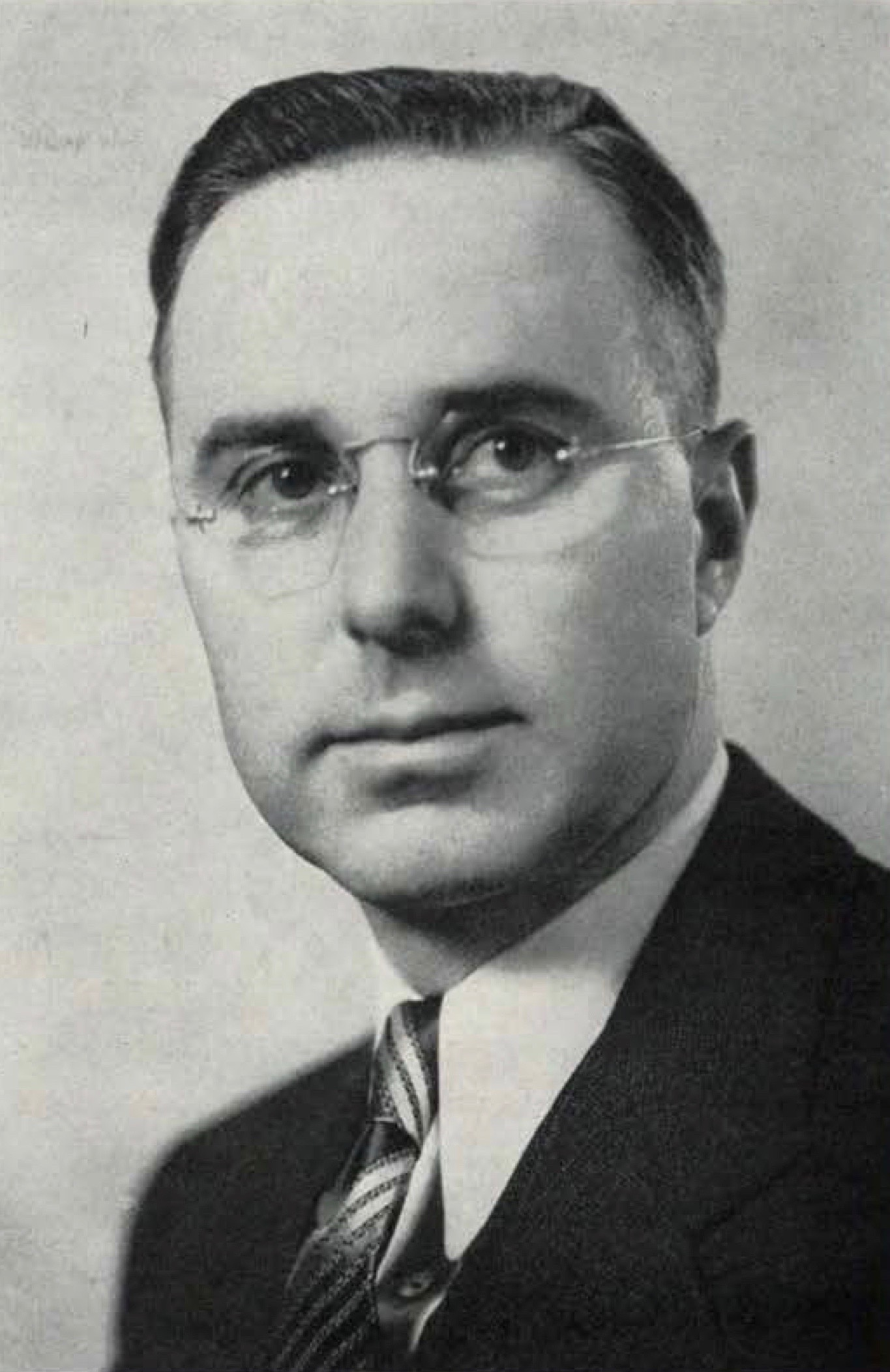
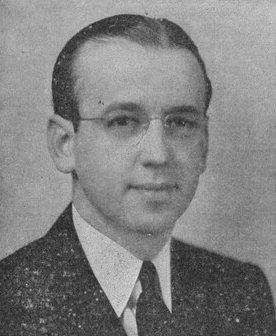
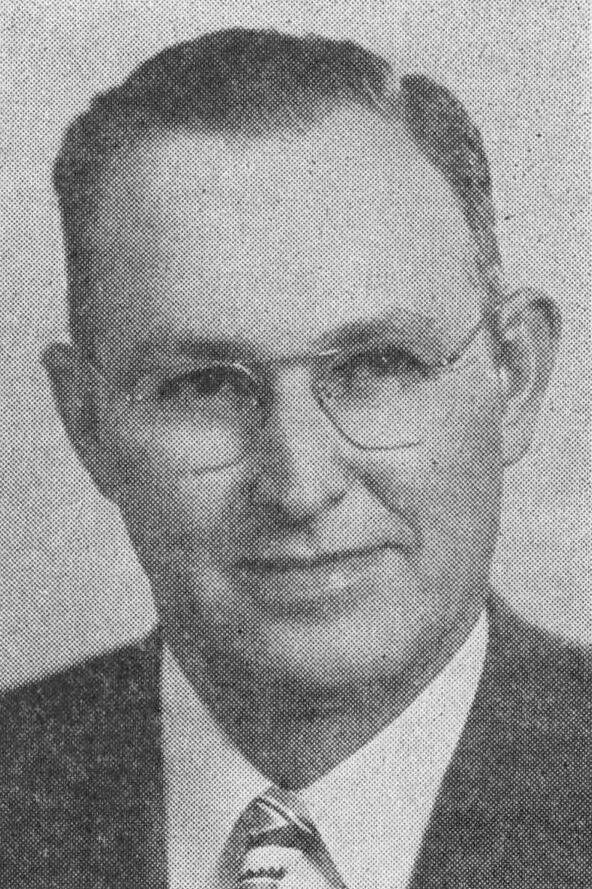
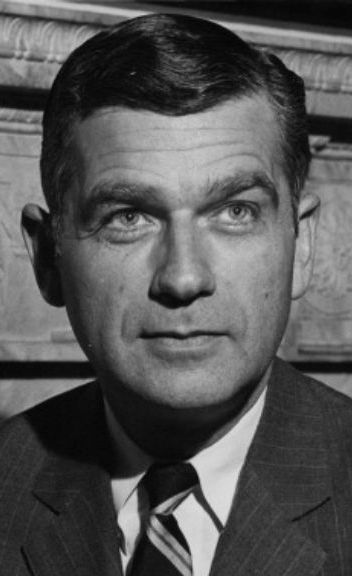
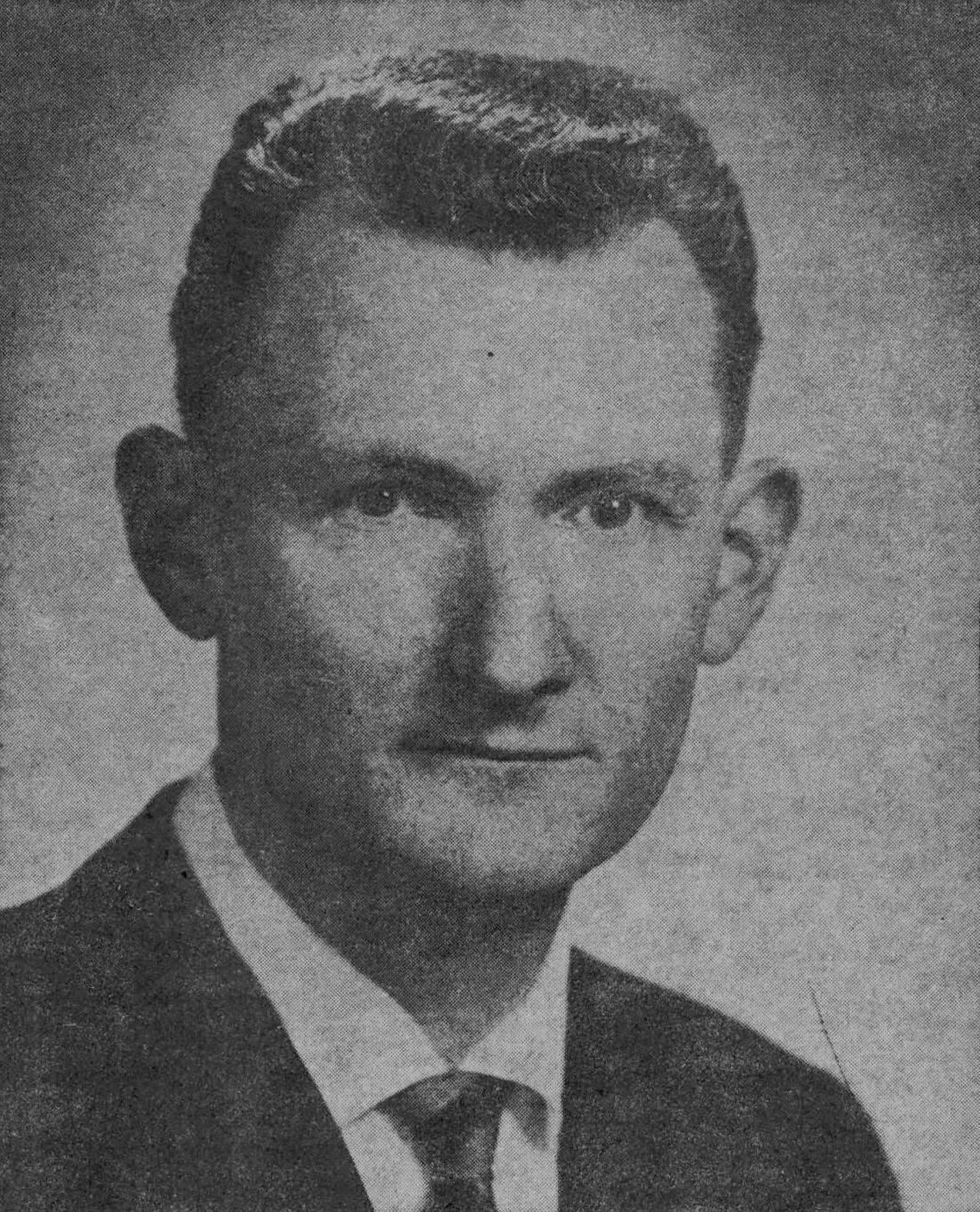
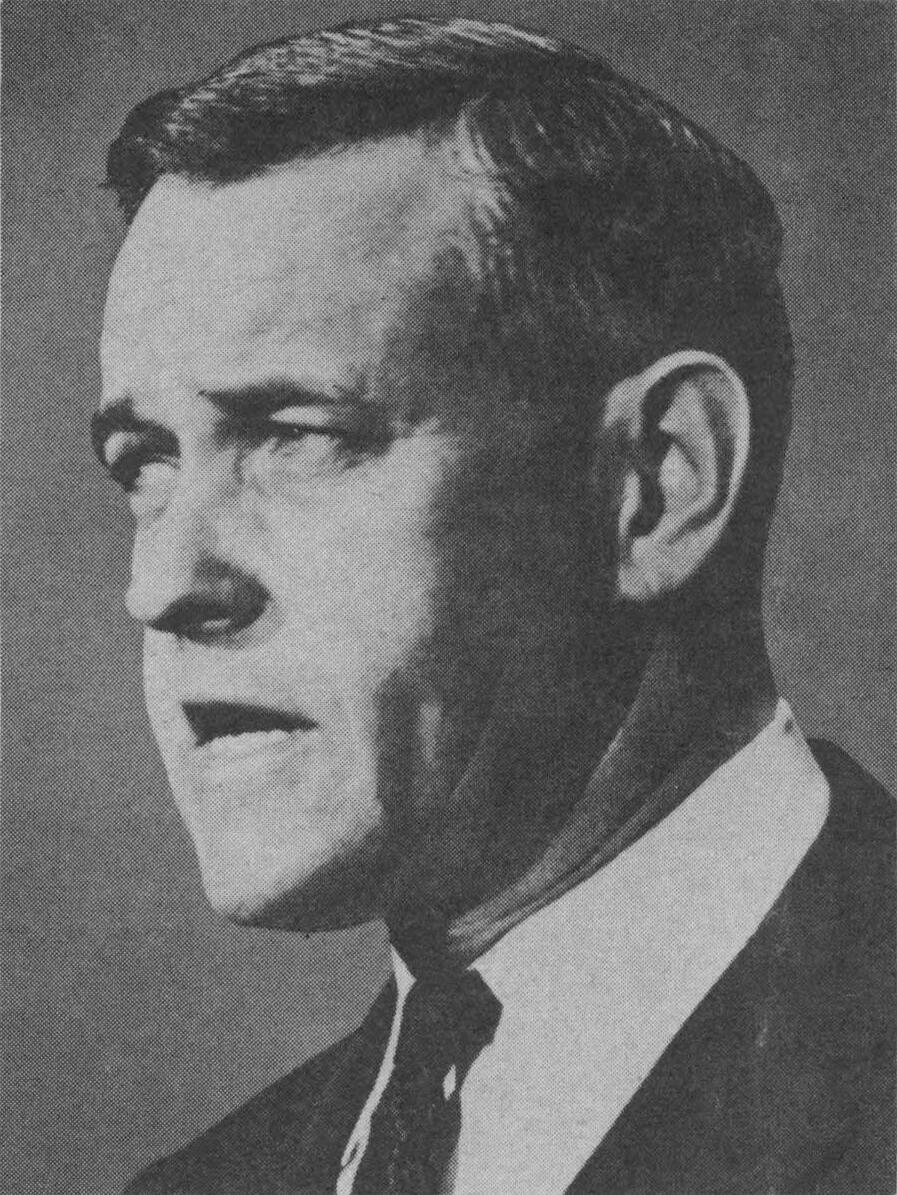
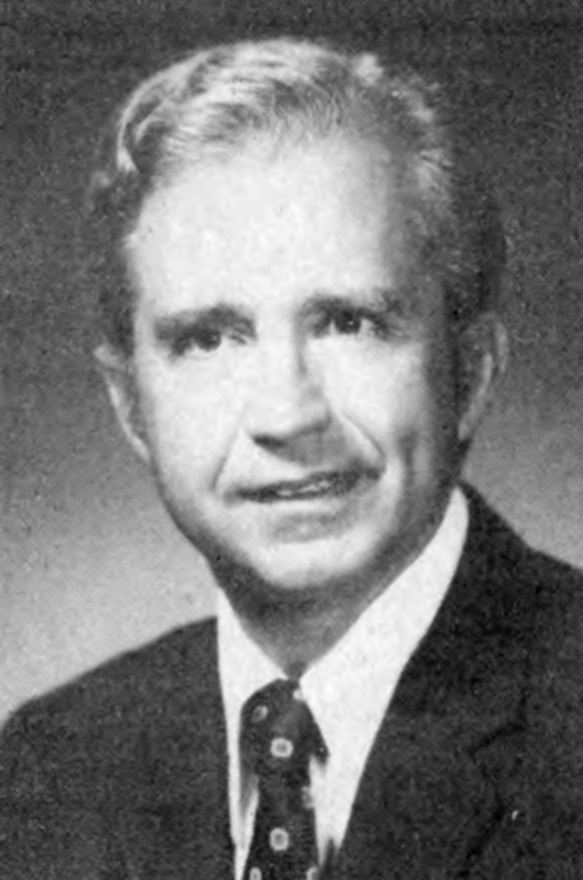
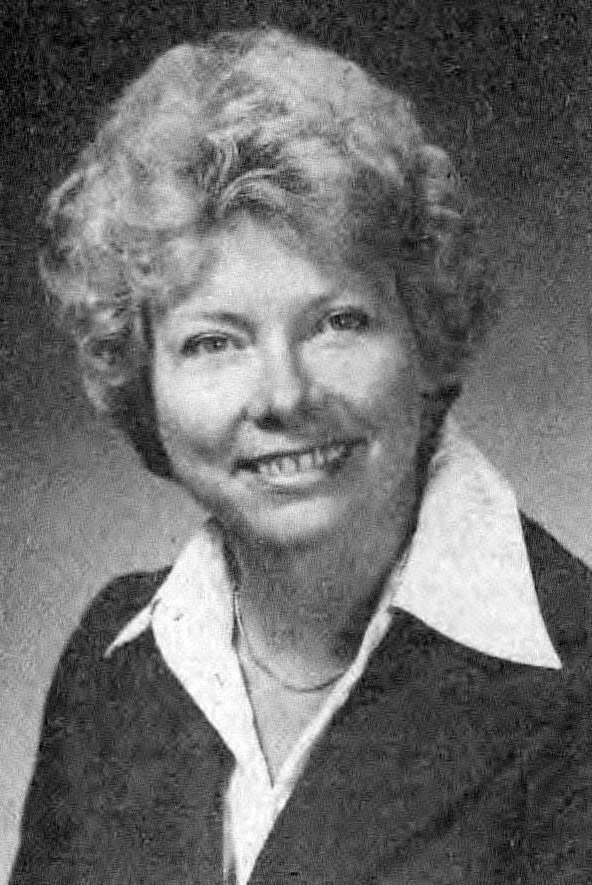
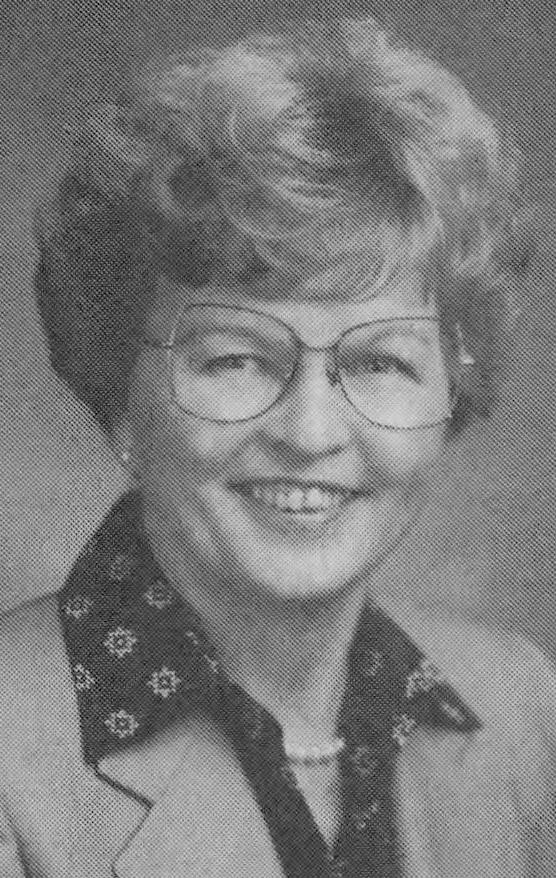
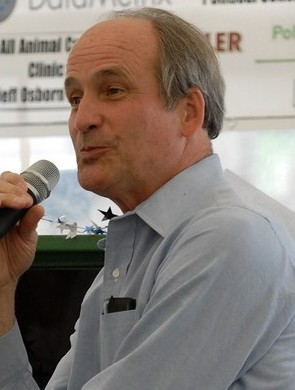
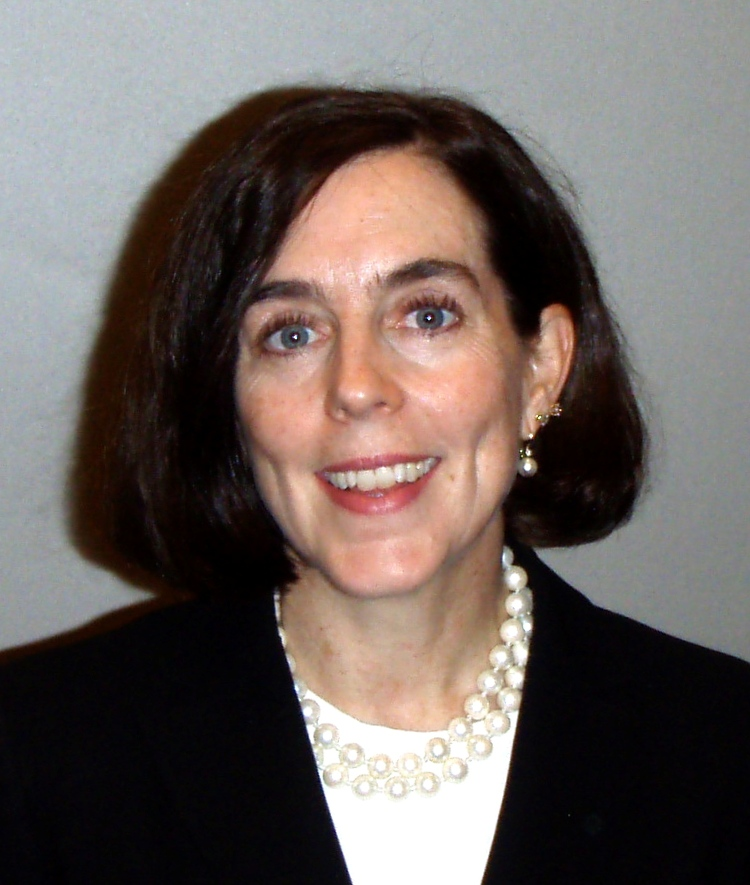
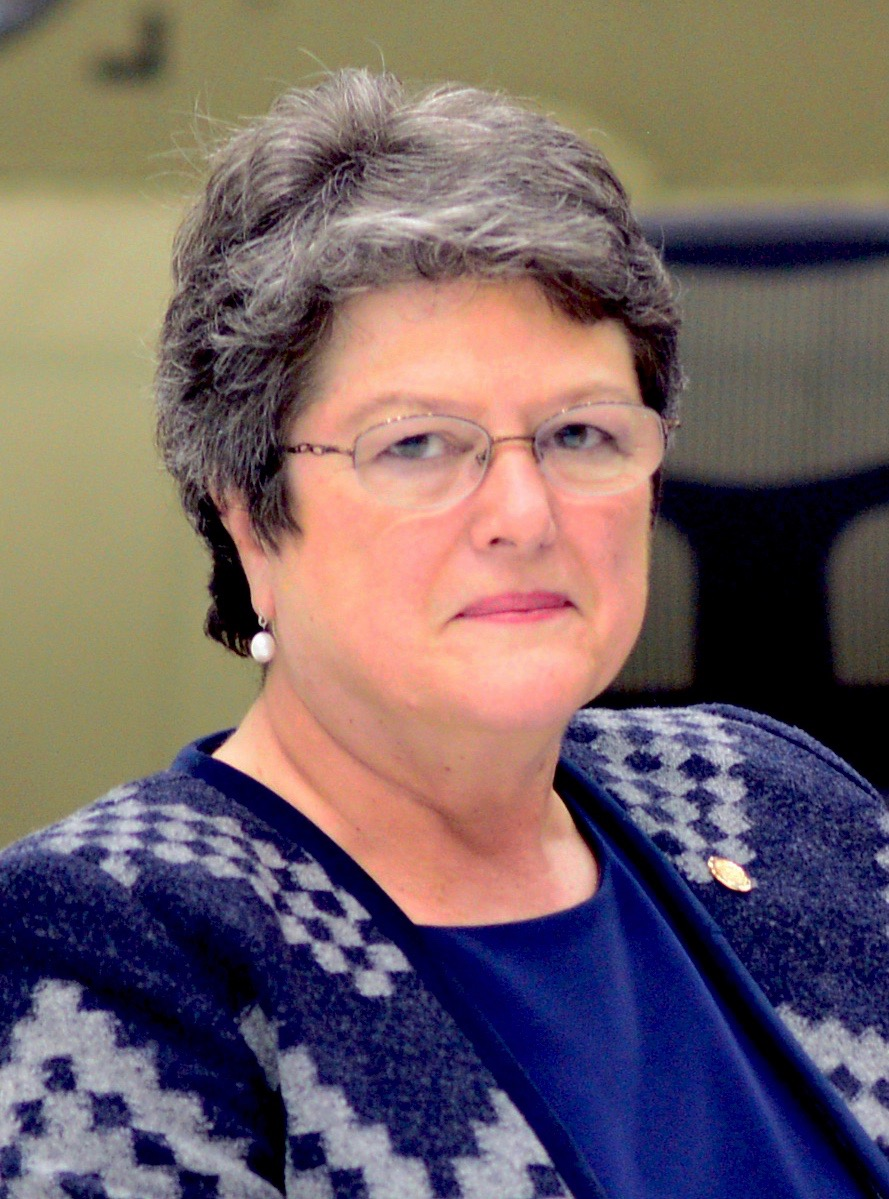
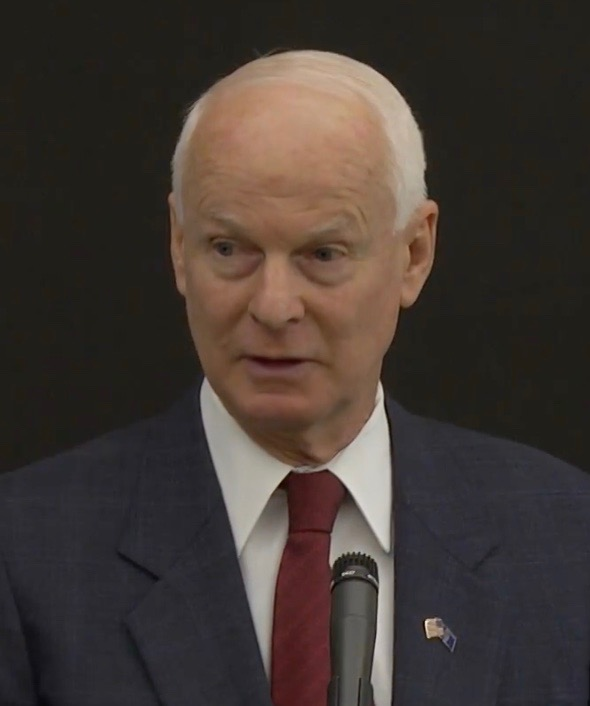
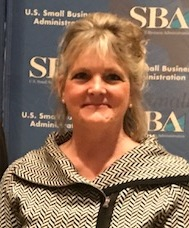
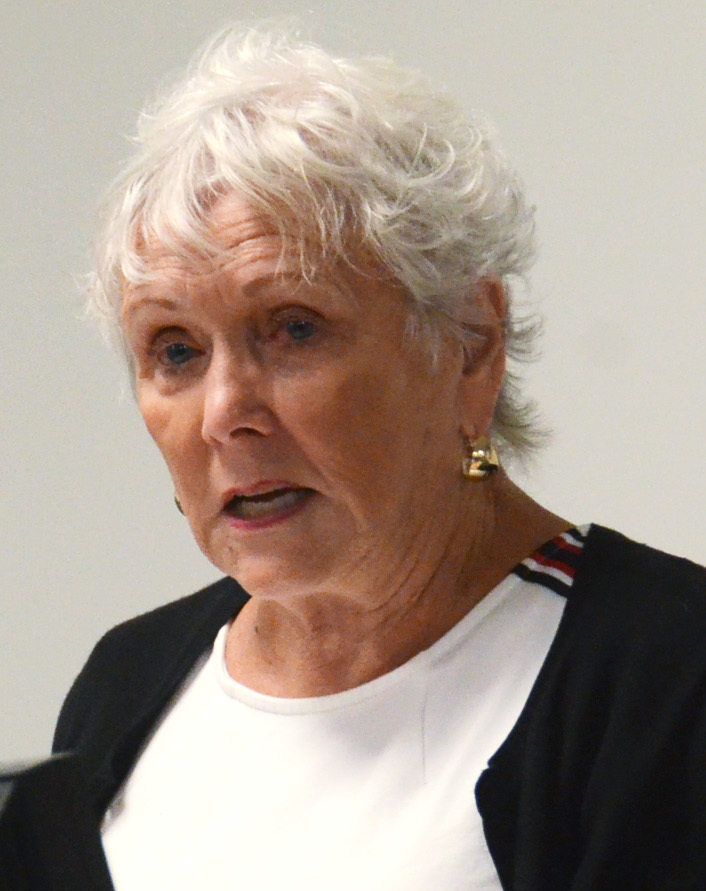
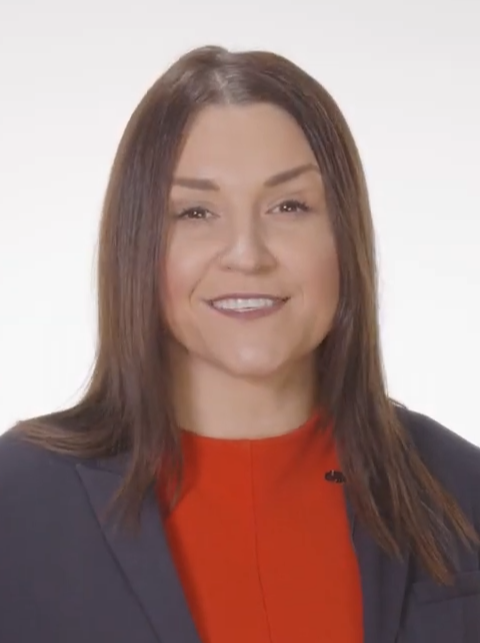
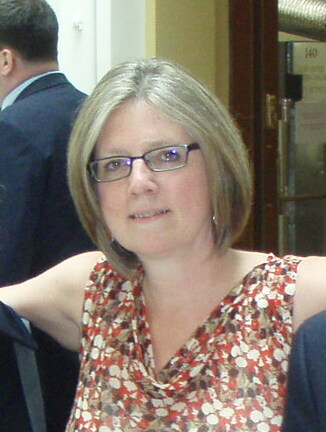
#	Image	Name	Party	Term
1		Lucien Heath	Democratic	March 3, 1859 – September 8, 1862
2		Samuel E. May	Republican	September 8, 1862 – September 10, 1870
3		Stephen F. Chadwick	Democratic	September 10, 1870 – September 2, 1878
4		Rockey Earhart	Republican	September 2, 1878 – January 10, 1887
5		George W. McBride	Republican	January 10, 1887 – January 14, 1895
6		Harrison R. Kincaid	Republican	January 14, 1895 – January 9, 1899
7		Frank L. Dunbar	Republican	January 9, 1899 – January 14, 1907
8		Frank W. Benson	Republican	January 15, 1907 – April 14, 1911
9		Ben W. Olcott	Republican	April 17, 1911 – May 28, 1920
10		Sam A. Kozer	Republican	May 28, 1920 – September 24, 1928
11		Hal E. Hoss	Republican	September 24, 1928 – February 6, 1934
12		Peter J. Stadelman	Republican	February 9, 1934 – January 7, 1935
13		Earl Snell	Republican	January 7, 1935 – January 4, 1943
14		Robert S. Farrell	Republican	January 4, 1943 – October 28, 1947
15		Earl T. Newbry	Republican	November 3, 1947 – January 7, 1957
16		Mark Hatfield	Republican	January 7, 1957 – January 12, 1959
17		Howell Appling	Republican	January 12, 1959 – January 4, 1965
18		Tom McCall	Republican	January 4, 1965 – January 9, 1967
19		Clay Myers	Republican	January 9, 1967 – January 3, 1977
20		Norma Paulus	Republican	January 3, 1977 – January 7, 1985
21		Barbara Roberts	Democratic	January 7, 1985 – January 14, 1991
22		Phil Keisling	Democratic	January 14, 1991 – November 8, 1999
23		Bill Bradbury	Democratic	November 8, 1999 – January 5, 2009
24		Kate Brown	Democratic	January 5, 2009 – February 18, 2015
25		Jeanne Atkins	Democratic	March 11, 2015 – January 2, 2017
26		Dennis Richardson	Republican	January 2, 2017 – February 26, 2019
–		Leslie Cummings; Acting	Republican	February 26, 2019 – March 31, 2019
27		Beverly Clarno	Republican	March 31, 2019 – January 4, 2021
28		Shemia Fagan	Democratic	January 4, 2021 – May 8, 2023
–		Cheryl Myers; Acting	Democratic	May 8, 2023 – June 30, 2023
29		LaVonne Griffin-Valade	Democratic	June 30, 2023 – January 6, 2025
30		Tobias Read	Democratic	January 6, 2025 – present
