= Hal E. Hoss =

American politician (1892–1934)

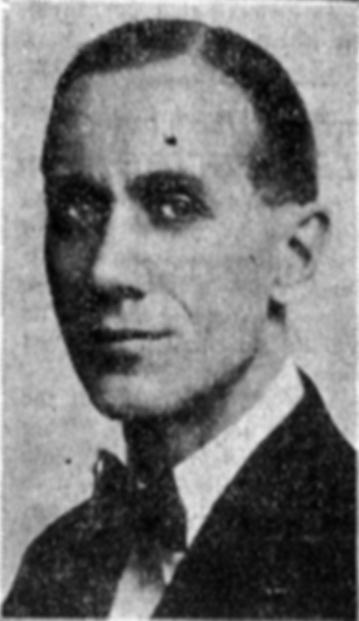
- Hoss, circa 1928

Oregon Secretary of State
- In office September 24, 1928 – February 6, 1934
- Governor: I. L. Patterson; A. W. Norblad; Julius L. Meier
- Preceded by: Sam A. Kozer
- Succeeded by: Peter J. Stadelman

Personal details
- Born: October 7, 1892 Portland, Oregon, U.S.
- Died: February 6, 1934 (aged 41)
- Party: Republican
- Spouse: Myrtle Lantz
- Occupation: Journalist

Hal Elden Hoss (October 7, 1892 – February 6, 1934) was an American journalist and politician in the state of Oregon. A native of Portland, he was raised there and edited several newspapers in Oregon before he became the private secretary for the Governor of Oregon, I. L. Patterson. A Republican, he served as Oregon Secretary of State for six years before he died in office.

== Early life ==
Hal Hoss was born on October 7, 1892, in Portland, Oregon, where he was raised. After he earned his education in that city he married Myrtle Lantz in 1914, and had four children together. In 1918, he became the editor of the Banner Courier newspaper of Oregon City. Hoss remained there until 1920 when began managing and editing the Enterprise paper, also in Oregon City. In 1922, he was inducted into Sigma Delta Chi, an honor society for journalists.

He remained in the newspaper business until 1926 at the Enterprise, and served as the president of the Oregon Press Association on several occasions. Hoss was active in attempts to reform the penal system, serving on commissions to this aim. He even was appointed to the state's parole board. In 1927, Hoss was hired by Governor I. L. Patterson to work as his personal secretary.

== Political career ==
On September 24, 1928, Sam A. Kozer resigned from the office of Oregon Secretary of State. Oregon Governor I. L. Patterson appointed the Republican Hoss on that same day to fill the remaining term of Kozer. Hoss then won election to a full four-year term in 1928, and won re-election in 1932 to a second four-year term. While in his first term, his office created the Operations Division and the state began to require testing to acquire a driver's license. Hal Elden Hoss died in office on February 6, 1934, at the age of 41.

Political offices
Preceded by Sam A. Kozer	Secretary of State of Oregon; 1928–1934	Succeeded by Peter J. Stadelman
