= George W. McBride =

American politician (1854–1911)

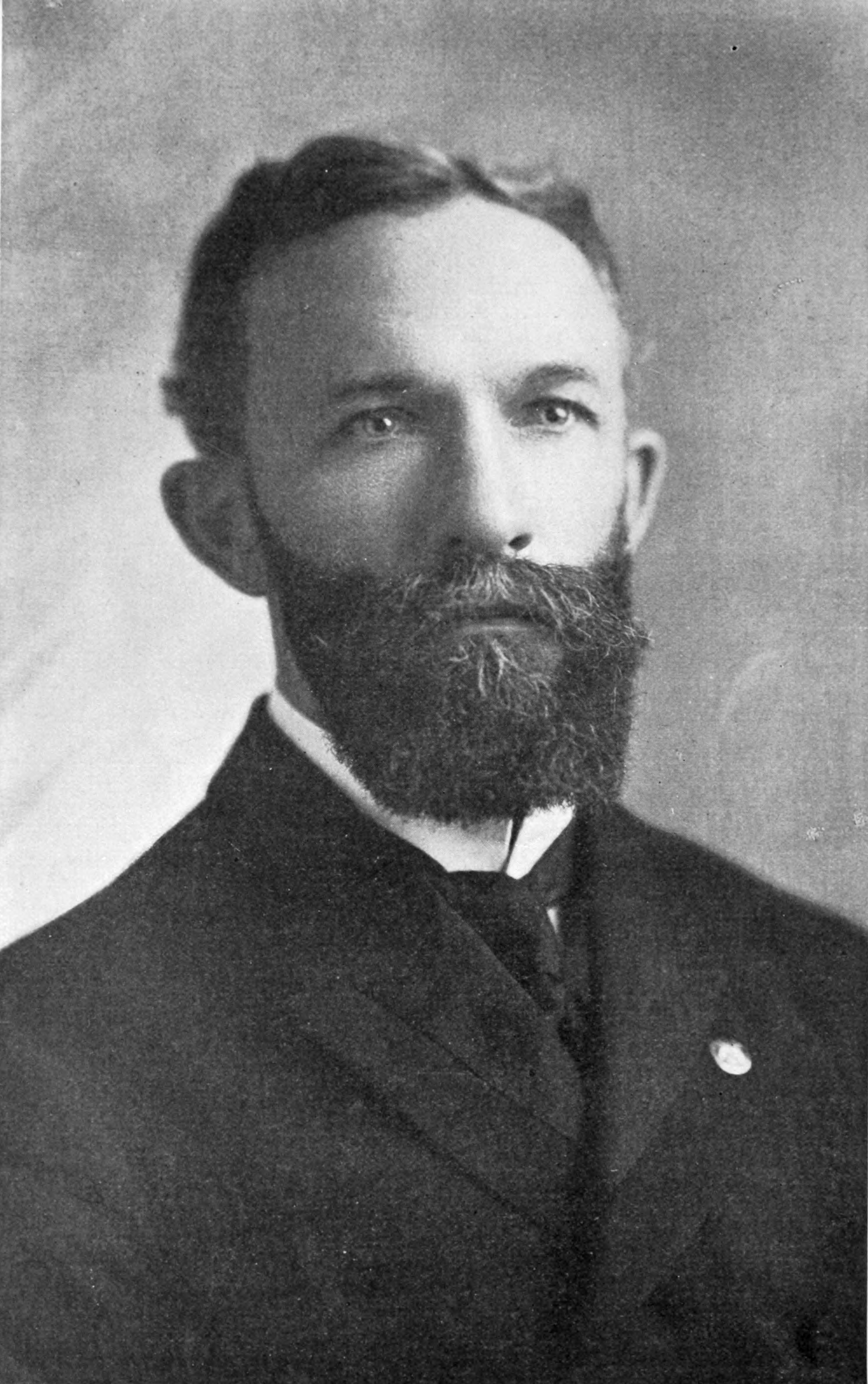

United States Senator from Oregon
- In office March 4, 1895 – March 3, 1901
- Preceded by: Joseph N. Dolph
- Succeeded by: John H. Mitchell

5th Secretary of State of Oregon
- In office January 10, 1887 – January 14, 1895
- Governor: Sylvester Pennoyer
- Preceded by: Rockey Preston Earhart
- Succeeded by: Harrison R. Kincaid

13th Speaker of the Oregon House of Representatives
- In office 1882–1884
- Preceded by: Zenas Ferry Moody
- Succeeded by: W. P. Keady
- Constituency: Columbia County

Personal details
- Born: March 13, 1854 Lafayette, Oregon, U.S.
- Died: June 18, 1911 (aged 57) Portland, Oregon, U.S.
- Party: Republican
- Spouse: Laura W. Walter
- Profession: merchant

George Wycliffe McBride (March 13, 1854 – June 18, 1911) was an American politician and businessman from the U.S. state of Oregon. An Oregon native, he served in the Oregon Legislative Assembly as Speaker of the House and as Oregon Secretary of State for two terms before election as United States Senator from Oregon. A Republican, he was the first native Oregonian to serve in the Senate. His father and two of his brothers were also politicians.

== Early life ==
George McBride was born on March 13, 1854, near Lafayette, in Yamhill County, Oregon. His father was James McBride, a physician from Tennessee and Missouri, and his mother the former Mahala Miller. George was one of fourteen children in the family that included brother John Rogers, who was a U.S. Representative from Oregon, and Thomas who served on the Oregon Supreme Court from 1909 to 1930.

George attended the local public schools before enrolling in the preparatory department of Willamette University in Salem, Oregon. After one year at Willamette he enrolled at Monmouth Christian College (now Western Oregon University) in Monmouth, Oregon, where he spent two years. McBride then studied law and was admitted to the bar, but never practiced. He moved to St. Helens where he engaged in mercantile pursuits for nine years.

== Politics ==
McBride was elected to the Oregon House of Representatives in 1882 to serve Columbia County. Elected as a Republican, he was selected by fellow legislators to serve as Speaker of the House. After his lone session in the legislative assembly, he was elected as the Oregon Secretary of State in 1886 to a four-year term and re-elected in 1890 to a second term. He was in office from January 10, 1887, until January 14, 1895, when Harrison R. Kincaid took office.

On February 23, 1895, the Oregon Legislative Assembly selected McBride to serve in the United States Senate. Elected as a Republican, he served one term in office from March 4, 1895, to March 3, 1901. In the Senate he was chairman of the United States Senate Committee on Transportation Routes to the Seaboard during the Fifty-fourth Congress, though the committee may never have met during his tenure, and also a member of the Committee on Coast Defenses during both Fifty-fifth and Fifty-sixth Congresses. He was the first native Oregonian to serve in the Senate. He was an unsuccessful candidate for renomination in 1900.

== Later life ==
McBride was appointed as a United States commissioner to the St. Louis Exposition of 1904. After politics he was engaged as an agent of the Western Pacific Railroad in California. On May 24, 1902, in New York City he married Laura W. Walter with whom he had one daughter. In 1911 McBride died in Portland, Oregon, at the age of 57. His remains were cremated and the ashes interred in the Masonic Cemetery in St. Helens.

Political offices
Preceded by Rockey Preston Earhart	Secretary of State of Oregon; 1887–1895	Succeeded by Harrison R. Kincaid
U.S. Senate
Preceded by Joseph N. Dolph	U.S. senator (Class 2) from Oregon; 1895–1901; Served alongside: John H. Mitchell, Joseph Simon	Succeeded by John H. Mitchell
