= Columbia College (Oregon) =

College in Eugene, Oregon, U.S.

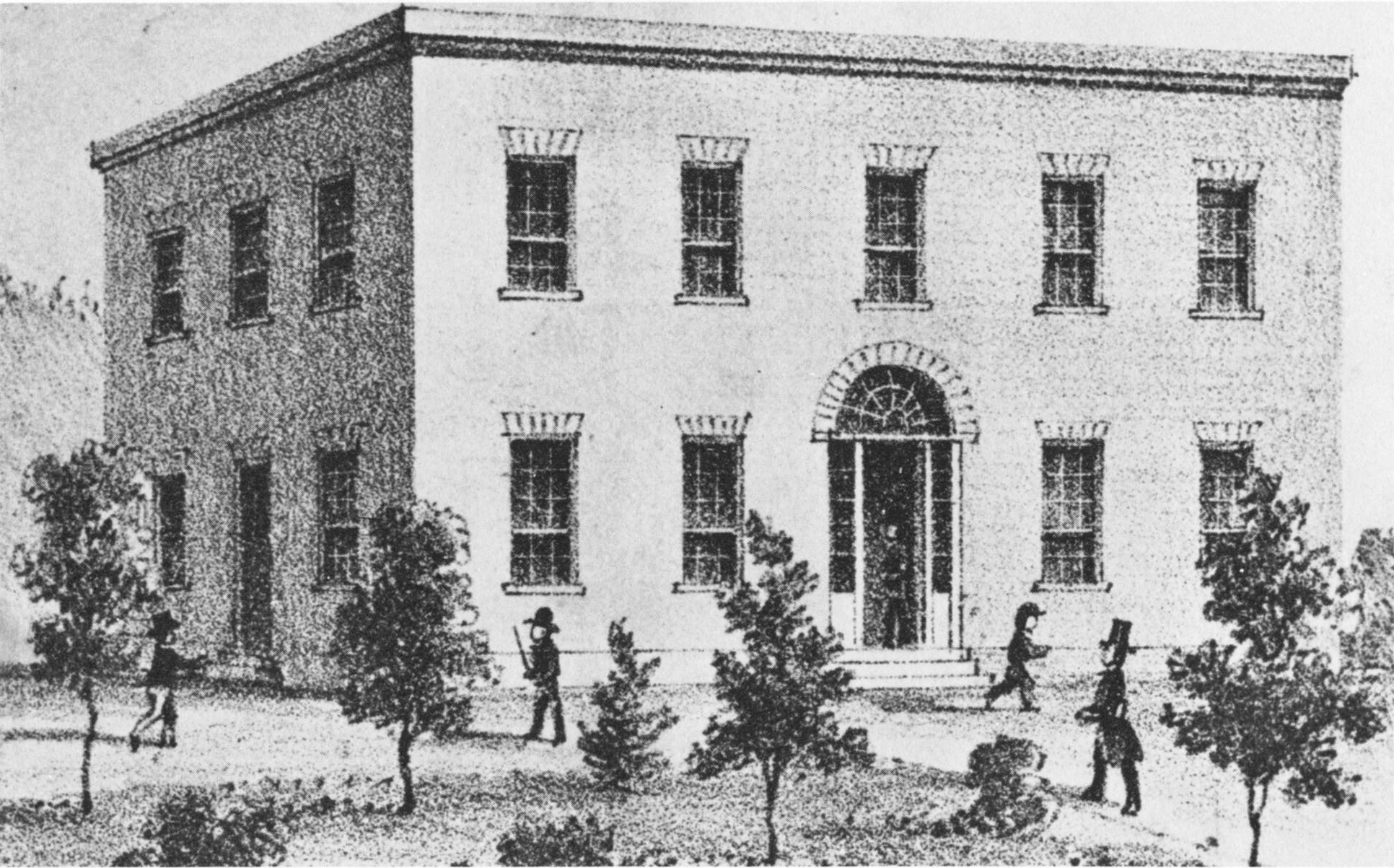
- Type: Private
- Active: 1856–1860
- Affiliations: Cumberland Presbyterian Church
- Location: Eugene, Oregon, United States

Columbia College was a college in Eugene in the U.S. state of Oregon. Founded in 1856, the school was part of a system of schools established by the Cumberland Presbyterian Church. The school's building burned down twice before the school closed in 1860. Today, the neighborhood in Eugene where the school was located is known as College Hill due to the former college.

== History ==
After the Cumberland Presbyterian Church split from the Presbyterian Church in 1810, the newer branch sought to found schools to educate ministers for future service in the church. As early as 1851, church leaders in Oregon discussed starting a school in what was then the Oregon Territory. Then at a meeting in Washington County on April 7, 1853, leaders created a committee to make plans for a school. That committee consisted of J. A. Cornwall, D. H. Bellknap, and James Henry Dickey Henderson, who on October 5 of that year presented a report recommending that funds be raised to establish a Presbyterian school in the territory.

The committee recommended raising $20,000 to start the school by selling scholarships at $100 each. They also said the college should be located between what was then Eugene City in the southern Willamette Valley and Lafayette at the northern edge of the valley. By December 1853 the plan was approved and the church began advertising to raise the funds. In 1854, a new committee was formed with Jacob Gillespie and Mr. Snodgrass, among others, to select the location for the new school, with the committee choosing Eugene on October 5, 1854. Gillespie, who was serving in the Oregon Territorial Legislature, then introduced a bill in order to secure a charter for the college on January 11, 1855.

At that point the school was named Pacific College, but was changed by the legislative committee to Columbia College. That committee, consisting of Gillespie, Asa L. Lovejoy, and Delazon Smith, returned the bill to the main assembly after a single day of consideration. A vote to pass the bill on January 17, 1855, was tabled by David Logan, but he then moved for a vote on January 20, and the bill passed, becoming law on January 24. The original charter called for a co-ed school, and was given to the church April 7, 1855. In May 1855, the board of trustees met for the first time and selected Samuel Dillard as the president of the board, and by October had secured 20 acres (8.1 ha) adjacent to Eugene and a 24-foot (7.3 m) by 48-foot (15 m) building to house the school was under construction. By August 1856, Enoch Pratt Henderson (brother of James Henry), a minister was hired to serve as president of the college, which he did from November 3, 1856 until September 19, 1859. The school opened on November 3, 1856, but did not start classes until November 17 with 52 students.

The school's new building burned soon after it opened, on November 20, in what was believed to be arson. Two-days later classes resumed at a rented home while plans were made to re-build. Within two-years enrollment grew to 150 students and a new building was finished. Classes were primarily preparatory classes during the existence of the college. The second structure completed in November 1857 was meant to be temporary, and it was, as it burned on February 26, 1858. Columbia tried to rebuild again, this time building a two-story building faced with sandstone. However, the new structure was not finished before the college closed.

== Closure and legacy ==
Conflict between church denominations led to the Cumberland Presbyterian Church withdrawing their financial support for the school. The conflict arose, in part, as the debate over slavery raged in the East in what would eventually result in the American Civil War. Parts of the church, based in Kentucky, supported slavery, while others were abolitionists. Slavery supporters attempted to gain control of the school's board of trustees, and eventually did in 1859, causing president Henderson to resign in 1859. M. I. Ryan then became the principal, who was pro-slavery, and in June 1860 he assaulted Byron J. Pengra before fleeing back east. The school also suffered from internal division over if religion should be taught in the school, as well as plans for another school in the Oregon Territory.

Meanwhile, Henderson sued the school for past wages, which led to the school declaring bankruptcy and closing its doors in 1860. The unfinished sandstone building stood until 1867 when it was torn down and some stones were used in the construction of a store on Willamette Street. The College Hill neighborhood in Eugene was named after Columbia College. In 1906, the city dedicated a monument to the school, located at Olive and Nineteenth.

== Notable alumni ==
- Harrison R. Kincaid
- Joaquin Miller
- William Thompson
- James F. Watson
