= Harrison R. Kincaid =

American journalist

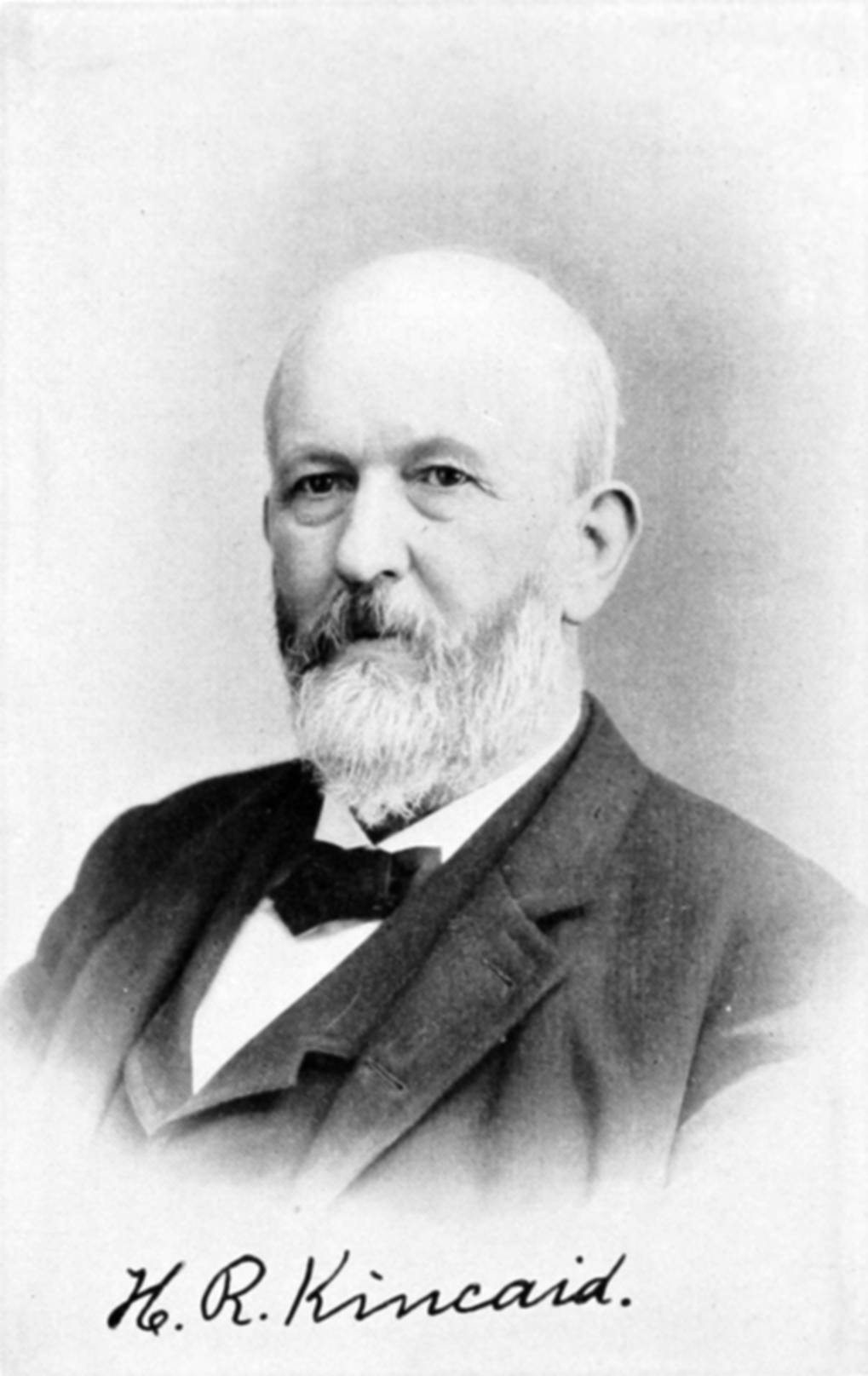

7^{th} Oregon Secretary of State
- In office January 14, 1895 – January 9, 1899
- Governor: William Paine Lord
- Preceded by: George W. McBride
- Succeeded by: Frank L. Dunbar

Personal details
- Born: January 3, 1836; Fall Creek Township, Indiana
- Died: October 2, 1920 (aged 84); Eugene, Oregon
- Political party: Republican

Harrison Rittenhouse Kincaid (January 3, 1836 – October 2, 1920) was an American printer, journalist, Republican politician, and university regent who served as Oregon Secretary of State between 1895 and 1899.

== Biography ==
Kincaid was born to Thomas Kincaid and Nancy Chodrick in Fall Creek Township, Indiana, moving to Eugene, Oregon, in 1853, at the age of 17. He found work as a miner along Althouse Creek, later attending Columbia College. Kincaid worked as a journalist after his graduation, serving as a clerk in the United States Senate between 1858 and 1879.

=== Oregon Secretary of State ===
Kincaid was elected Oregon Secretary of State in 1894, assuming office on January 14, 1895. He left office on January 9, 1899. Kincaid won election to the office over Prohibitionist F. Kercher, Democrat Charles Nickell, and Populist Ira Wakefield.

== Personal life ==
Kincaid married Augusta A. Lockwood in 1873. They had one son, Webster Lockwood Kincaid, who himself had two sons. he died in 1920.

Political offices
Preceded by George W. McBride	Secretary of State of Oregon; 1895–1899	Succeeded by Frank L. Dunbar
