= Oregon Sustainability Board =

The Oregon Sustainability Board is an advisory panel which examines current practices of individuals, business and government within the U.S. state of Oregon issuing reports, recommendations and proposals, and develops resources to promote policies and legislation to foster practices which meet current needs in a manner which also consider those of future generations. Originally formed by a 2000 Executive Order by then Governor John Kitzhaber as the "Sustainability Workgroup," which was further defined, empowered and budgeted by the state legislature in the Oregon Sustainability Act, which gave the board its current name. The relevant provisions of that Act set to expire without legislative renewal in 2006, Governor Ted Kulongoski issued a further executive order continuing its existence.

The Board is composed of eleven members from both the public and private sector, all appointed by the Governor and serving at his pleasure, and is chaired by the Secretary of State as the Governor's representative. It maintains a website in conjunction with the Oregon Economic & Community Development Department, and with cooperative support from the Governor's Office, the Oregon Department of Administrative Services, Ecotrust, and Sustainable Northwest.
