= Peter J. Stadelman =

American politician (1871–1954)

Oregon Secretary of State
- In office February 9, 1934 – January 7, 1935
- Governor: Julius L. Meier
- Preceded by: Hal E. Hoss
- Succeeded by: Earl Snell

Member of the Oregon State Senate
- In office 1937–1948
- Constituency: Wasco County; Hood River County

Mayor of The Dalles, Oregon
- In office 1918–1928

Personal details
- Born: October 29, 1871 Hempstead, New York, U.S.
- Died: January 10, 1954 (aged 82)
- Party: Republican
- Occupation: Businessman

Peter John Stadelman (October 29, 1871 – January 10, 1954) was an American businessman and politician from the state of Oregon. A native of New York, he was raised in The Dalles, Oregon, where he was a prominent businessman and mayor. A Republican, he served as Oregon Secretary of State during The Great Depression and later in the Oregon State Senate.

== Early life ==
Peter Stadelman was born in Hempstead, New York, on October 29, 1871, to an Austrian immigrant and native New Yorker. His father, Joseph, immigrated to the United States in 1869, where he married Mary Rath. He was raised near The Dalles along the Columbia River at the family's farm, which once belonged to the Catholic Mission. Stadelman received his education at the public schools in The Dalles before starting work as a paper delivery boy for The Oregonian, and then as an assistant at the local post office.

In 1893, Stadelman began working in the ice and fruit business, which led him to start his own company in 1898, the Stadelman Fruit and Ice Company. He was married in 1904 to Mary Kelly Hicks, and they had two sons, Wilbur and George Peter. Stadelman purchased the family farm with his brother in 1907 from their father. In 1920, he was a founder of the Citizen's National Bank in that city, and later served as the president of the bank.

== Political career ==
Stadelman first entered politics as a city councilor in The Dalles, serving from 1908 to 1914. In 1918, he became the mayor of the city and remained in office until 1928. On February 6, 1934, Oregon Secretary of State Hal E. Hoss died in office. Oregon Governor Julius Meier appointed the Republican Stadelman on February 9, to fill the remaining term of Hoss. Stadelman served as Secretary of State from that day until January 7, 1935, when Earl Snell took office. In 1936, he was elected to the Oregon State Senate to represent District 16 covering Wasco and Hood River counties as a Republican. Stadelman won re-election to additional four-year terms in 1940 and 1944, and served through the 1947 legislative session.

== Later years ==
At one time his company had the biggest cold storage facility in the eastern portion of Oregon. His wife died on July 10, 1924. In 1930, he sold his cold storage company to his sons, which was later moved to Yakima, Washington. Peter John Stadelman died on January 10, 1954, at the age of 82.

Political offices
Preceded by Hal E. Hoss	Secretary of State of Oregon; 1934–1935	Succeeded by Earl Snell
