= The Register-Guard =

Daily newspaper published in Eugene, Oregon

Coordinates: 44.086464°N 123.052628°W

- 2017 front page
- Type: Daily newspaper
- Format: Broadsheet
- Owner: USA Today Co.
- Editor: Jill Bond
- Photo editor: Chris Pietsch
- Founded: 1867; 159 years ago (as The Guard); 1895; 131 years ago (as Morning Register); 1930; 96 years ago (Current entity)
- Language: American English
- Headquarters: 3500 Chad Drive, Suite 600; Eugene, Oregon, U.S.
- Country: United States
- Circulation: 18,886 Daily; 21,416 Sunday
- ISSN: 0739-8557
- OCLC number: 9836354
- Website: registerguard.com

The Register-Guard is a daily newspaper in the northwestern United States, published in Eugene, Oregon. It was formed in a 1930 merger of two Eugene papers, the Eugene Daily Guard and the Morning Register. The paper serves the Eugene-Springfield area, as well as the Oregon Coast, Umpqua River valley, and surrounding areas. As of 2019, it had a supposed circulation of 18,886 daily.

The newspaper has been owned by The Gannett Company since Gannett's 2019 merger with GateHouse Media. It had been sold to GateHouse in 2018. From 1927 to 2018, it was owned by the Baker family of Eugene, and members of the family served as both editor and publisher for nearly all of that time period. It is Oregon's second-largest daily newspaper and, until the 2018 sale to GateHouse, was one of the few medium-sized family newspapers left in the United States.

== History ==
=== Establishment ===
The Guard was launched in Eugene City on Saturday, June 1, 1867, by John B. Alexander, and has been continuously published since October 24 of that year. The paper began as a weekly organ expressing allegiance to the states' rights–oriented Democratic Party and it joined an existing Republican paper in the field, the Oregon State Journal, published by Harrison R. Kincaid.

Founding publisher Alexander was born about 1830 and came to Oregon from Illinois as a pioneer in 1852. Alexander initially worked as a farmer, supplementing his income as a surveyor and local justice of the peace before learning the printing trade working for the town's earlier pro-Southern newspapers. Although his own venture as a publisher was short and unprofitable, Alexander unwittingly was the scion of a local newspaper dynasty in Oregon, with two of his sons later themselves publishing The Guard (following the tenure of several intermediate owners), while a grandson, George L. Alexander, would one day edit another Oregon paper, the Lebanon Express.

Alexander and his paper vocally supported the old governing class of the former Confederate States of America and were rabid in their opposition to the policies of the Reconstruction era imposed upon the South by the Northern-based Republican Party. Such views were out of step with the majority of Oregonians, however, with the Republicans coming to dominate Oregon politics during the last quarter of the 19th century. Alexander was forced to liquidate his stake in his money-losing newspaper in 1868.

=== Ownership changes ===
Front page of one of the earliest surviving examples of The Guard, published by John B. Alexander in August 1867

A short interregnum followed, during which ownership was transferred to J. W. Skaggs. Skaggs continued to push Alexander's Democratic Party/states' rights agenda during his short five weeks at the helm. The poor economics of the weekly paper were unchanged, however, and Skaggs immediately moved to unload his newly acquired white elephant. He cut his losses and avoided the stigma of financial failure for himself and the conservative political movement by giving away the paper outright to two men who worked for him as printers, William Thompson and William Victor. According to Thompson's later recollection, Skaggs sweetened the transfer of ownership by tossing in two bundles of paper and two cords of firewood for the new owners.

The leading partner in the new ownership pair, William Thompson (1846 1934), had come to Oregon from his native Missouri aboard a wagon train during the 1850s and had worked as a printer's devil for the Democratic Eugene City newspapers the Democratic Register and The Review from the age of 16. His acquisition of The Guard required only that he fulfill a contractual obligation "to run the paper and keep it alive." This he and Victor managed to do successfully, earning Thompson a healthy $1,200 for his work before his sale of the paper to George J. Buys and A. Eltzroth on December 24, 1869. Thompson would subsequently move to Roseburg, Oregon, and there establish a new newspaper, the Roseburg Plaindealer.

George J. Buys bought out his business partner Eltzroth in July 1870 and subsequently remained solely at the publisher's desk for more than seven years. He continued to battle for the Democratic Party, "first, last, and always" in competition with the Republican Oregon State Journal and the short-lived Eugene City Hawk-Eye, which professed allegiance to the similarly shorter-lived Oregon Independent Party, which ran a full slate of candidates for state and local office in the election of 1874.

Buys ended his tenure as owner of The Guard in May 1877 when he sold out to the sons of the original publisher, F. R. Alexander and W. R. Alexander. Their stint as publishers was nearly as brief as their father's, and in November 1878 they sold the paper yet again, this time to the brothers John R. Campbell and Ira Campbell, who would remain owners for 30 years.

=== Growth ===
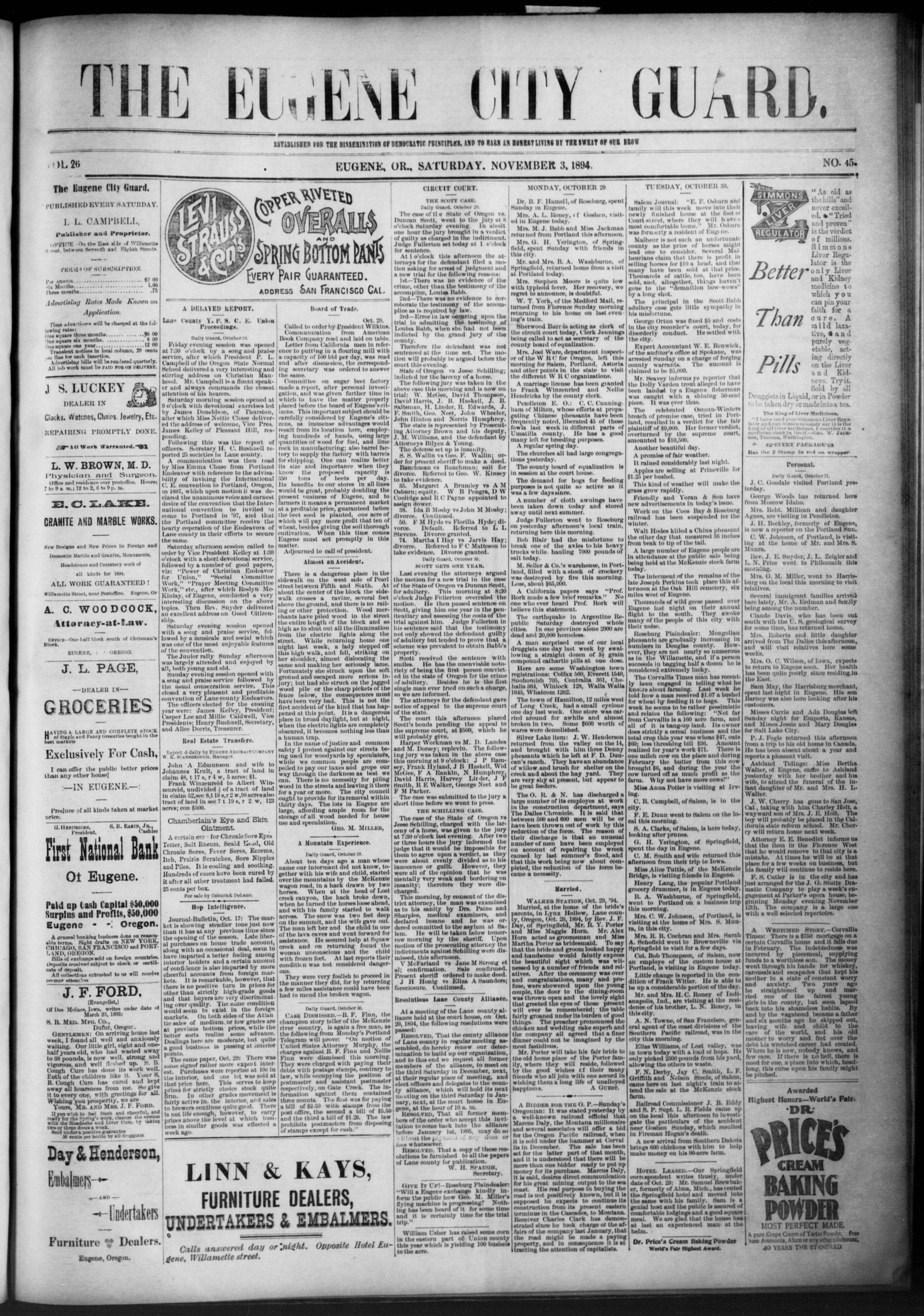
The front page of the newspaper on November 3, 1894

In 1890, the Eugene Guard became a daily newspaper. Charles H. Fisher took over the paper in 1907 and published it until 1912 when E. J. Finneran purchased the paper. Finneran bankrupted the newspaper in 1916, partly due to the purchase of a perfecting press that proved too expensive for such a small newspaper. The University of Oregon's journalism school briefly ran the paper during the receivership under the guidance of Eric W. Allen.

In April 1916, Fisher returned along with partner J. E. Shelton, forming The Guard Printing Company. Fisher continued to publish the Capital Journal in Salem until 1921. In 1924, after Fisher died, Paul R. Kelty purchased the Guard and published it with his son, before selling it in 1927. The paper was purchased in 1927 by publisher Alton F. Baker Sr., whose father had published The Plain Dealer. Three years later, Baker bought the Morning Register and merged the two papers on November 17, 1930; the first Register-Guard edition was the next afternoon. Reporter William Tugman was recruited from The Plain Dealer to be the managing editor of the new paper.

== Post-merger history ==
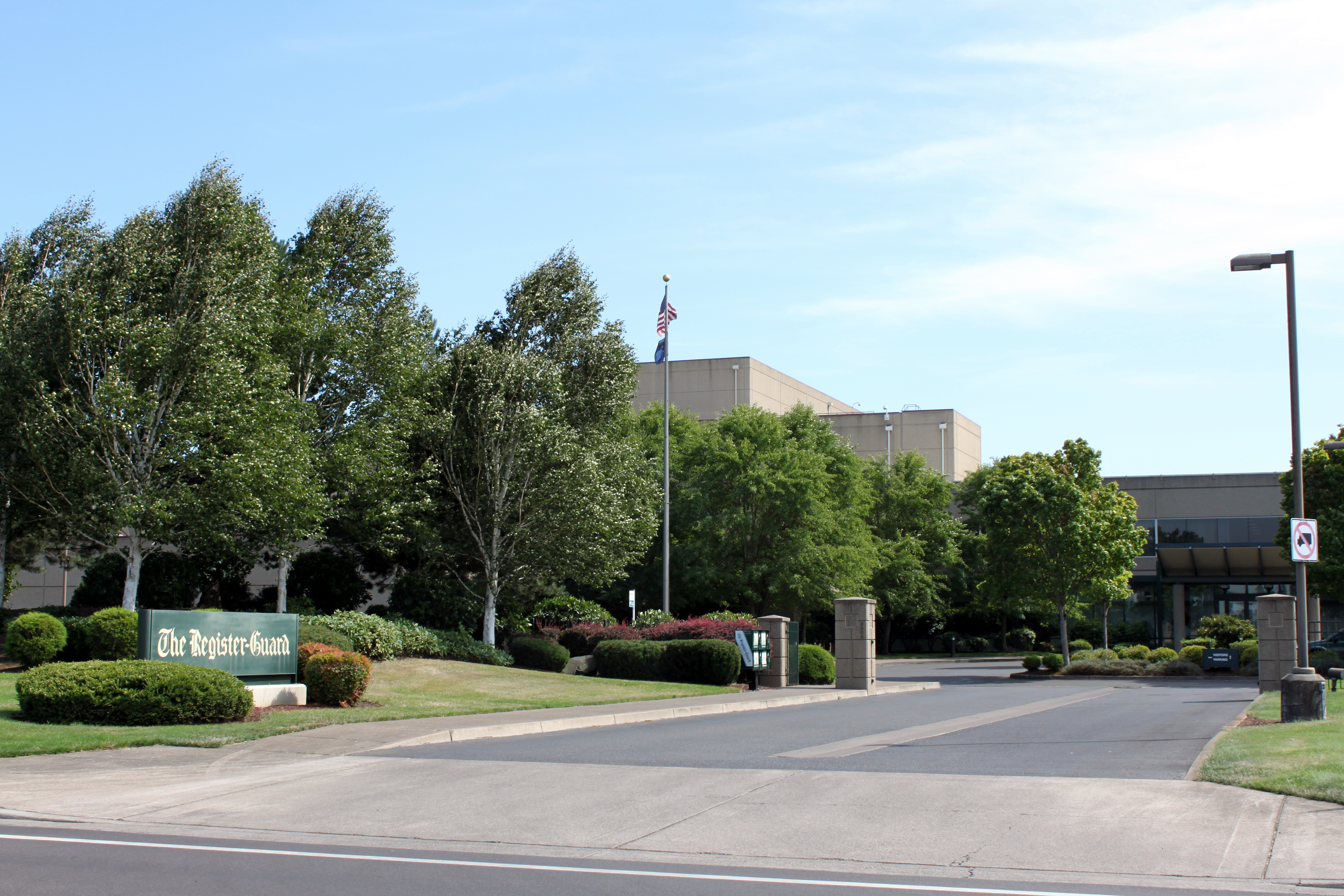
Company headquarters entrance

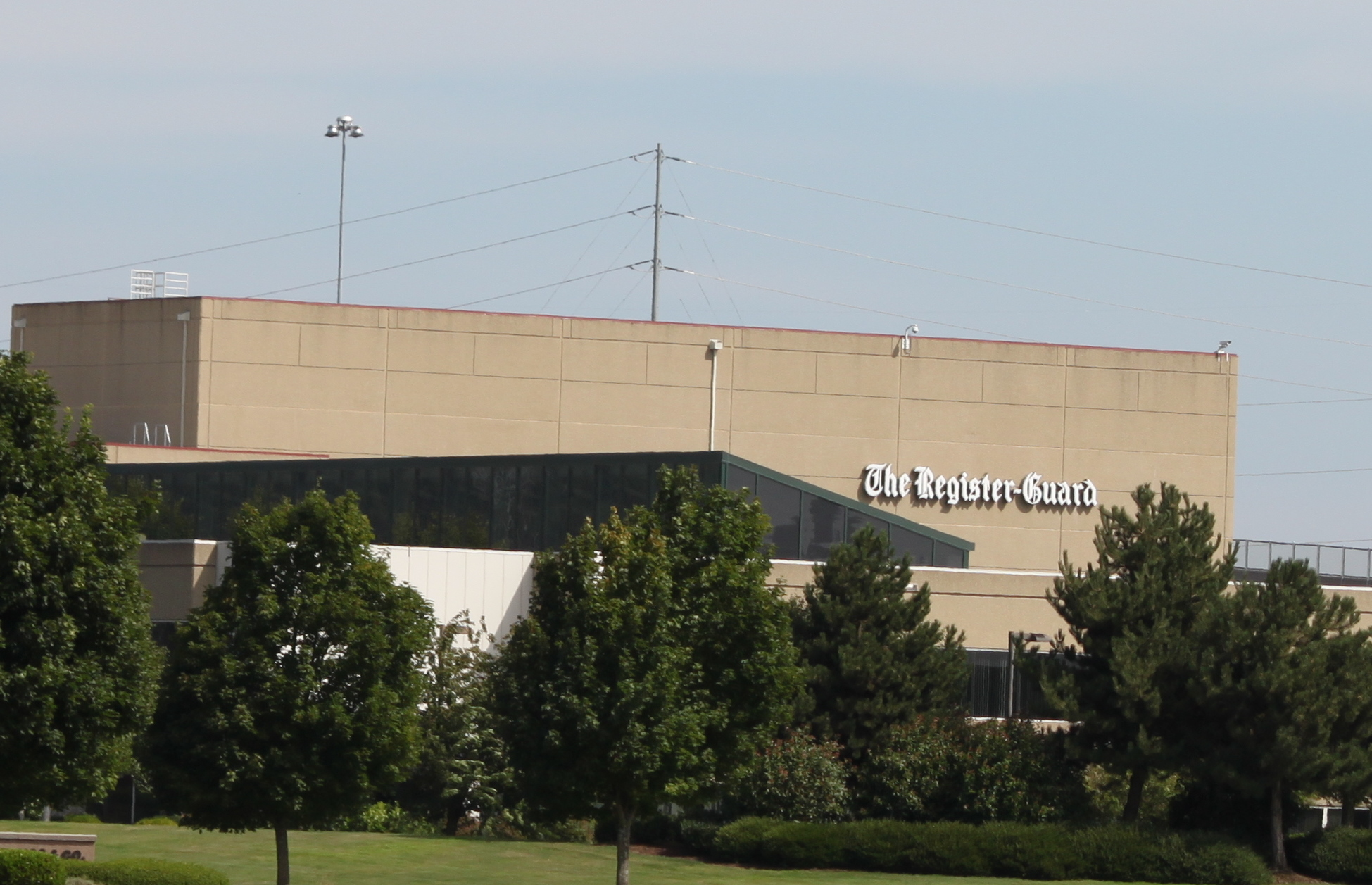
Register-Guard building

In 1953, Tugman was one of four editors in the country to sign a declaration opposing Senator Joseph McCarthy's questioning of New York Post editor James Wechsler in closed Senate hearings. Eugene S. Pulliam of The Indianapolis Star, J. R. Wiggins of The Washington Post, and Herbert Brucker of the Hartford Courant were the other editors to sign the declaration, calling Senator McCarthy's actions "a peril to American freedom."

Alton F. "Bunky" Baker Jr., son of Alton F. Baker Sr., inherited the newspaper in 1961 and later passed it on to his brother Edwin. In the late 1980s, it was handed down to Alton F. "Tony" Baker III, who remained the paper's editor and publisher for more than 28 years, until 2015.

It was an afternoon paper on weekdays until 1983; the last evening edition was on Friday, September 9, and it dropped "Eugene" from its title. Saturday editions had shifted to mornings a dozen years earlier, in 1971; the last afternoon edition was July 17.

In August 1996, a photographer and reporter from the paper were arrested by the United States Forest Service for trespassing at the site of a timber protest in a national forest. The Register-Guard responded by suing the Forest Service for violating the First Amendment freedom of the press. The criminal charges were later dropped and the civil suit was settled out of court.

Originally located in downtown Eugene, the paper moved to its current location in northeast Eugene in January 1998. The former Register-Guard building was leased by the University of Oregon and renamed the Baker Downtown Center for the Baker family. The building houses the university's printing and mailing facility, archives, and continuing education program, as well as the Oregon Career Information System.

In 2000, the company began negotiations with the employee's union for a new contract, and during negotiations banned the use of the company email system by the union. This led to an unfair labor practice charge against the newspaper, with the National Labor Relations Board (NLRB) ruling for the paper in December 2007 that employers can ban employees' pro-union emails from the company email system. The NLRB reconsidered the decision on emails on June 26, 2011, under a remand for reconsideration by the United States Court of Appeals in Washington, D.C. Upon review, the NLRB agreed with the Court that the R-G violated union members' rights by changing rules. The new decision allowed Register-Guard employees to send union-related emails without restrictions. On December 27, 2014, the NLRB overturned the 2007 ruling with Purple Communications, Inc., which gave union members the right to send union emails during non-work time.

In the weeks following the September 11, 2001 attacks, the newspaper saw a 1.6 percent increase in paper sales. In 2006, the paper received protests regarding its policy against including birth announcements from same-sex couples. It was reported that managing editor Dave Baker was very helpful when same-sex couples first complained "until he talked to Alton Baker [III], and then he stopped returning our phone calls." In November 2008, the Register-Guard finally changed its policy and printed a birth announcement featuring names of both the child's female parents.

In 2003, the newspaper reduced the width of the printing to 12.5 inches (320 millimeters) to reduce costs, and further shrank the paper to 11 inches (280 mm) in 2009.

Since June 17, 2008, by court order, access to the website of The Register-Guard has been blocked in Turkey because its domain name was once linked to a phishing scam.

In 2009, two separate layoffs reduced the newspaper's staff by the equivalent of 41 positions; by August 2009, it had 305 full- and part-time employees. The company's management blamed the layoffs on the "lousy economy" and advertising revenues that were 16 percent below projections in May and about 25 percent for June, July, and the first half of August.

In May 2015, Tony Baker stepped down as the Register-Guard's editor and publisher, after 28 years, making the end of an 88-year span in which someone from the Baker family had headed the paper. He was succeeded as editor and publisher by N. Christian Anderson III, who had been publisher of The Oregonian since 2009 and president of the Oregonian Media Group since 2013. Anderson began working in the new position on June 1, 2015, but held it for less than seven months. In mid-December 2015, Tony Baker, the chairman of the Guard Publishing Company, announced that Anderson "is no longer Editor and Publisher" of the Register-Guard, and that the Baker family was taking control again. Tony Baker returned to the position of editor and publisher. In July 2016, Logan Molen took over as publisher and CEO of RG Media Company (the newspaper, marketing, advertising and digital services part of Guard Publishing Company), while Baker remained as chairman of the board of Guard Publishing.

=== Sale to GateHouse Media ===
In January 2018, the Register-Guard announced its sale to newspaper conglomerate GateHouse Media. The paper's ownership was officially transferred on March 1 of that year, with Molen replaced as publisher by GateHouse hire Shanna Cannon. One of the first actions was to close the statehouse bureau.

=== Ownership by Gannett ===
GateHouse Media purchased Gannett in November 2019, retaining the Gannett name for the merged operation.

In April 2020, Cannon departed the paper. Gannett announced Executive Editor Alison Bath would resume leadership of the newspaper. Gannett eliminated the executive editor position May 2, 2020, citing the ongoing integration of Gatehouse-Gannett merger. Managing Editor Michelle Maxwell is the highest-ranking editor in the Eugene newsroom. The Register-Guard will collaborate more closely in the Gannett network and with Pacific Northwest newsrooms, including the Statesman Journal in Salem, Oregon; the Kitsap Sun in Bremerton, Washington, and the Great Falls Tribune in Montana.

In March 2022, The Register-Guard moved to a six-day printing schedule, eliminating its printed Saturday edition.

In May 2023, it was reported that since the paper's sale in 2018, the newsroom staff had shrunk from over eighty employees to six (including only two reporters), the paper no longer employed a local editor, publisher, or advertising representatives, and all advertising and editorial decisions were now made by the staff of Salem's Statesman-Journal.

== Awards ==
The paper won in a tie for best feature photo in 1997 from the Oregon Newspaper Publishers Association. In 1998, the paper took first place for science reporting from the Pacific Northwest Society of Professional Journalists competition for Excellence in Journalism. The Register-Guard took first place in the same competition in 2001 for best arts coverage. In 1999, the newspaper was a Pulitzer Prize finalist for Spot News Photography, for its coverage of the community's reaction to shootings at Springfield's Thurston High School by student Kip Kinkel.

The Oregon Newspaper Publishers Association's 2010 General Excellence Award again went to The Register-Guard, and so did the association's Best Overall Website award.

== See also ==
- Alton Baker Park, named for founder Alton F. Baker Sr.
