= Frank L. Dunbar =

American politician (1860–1945)

7^{th} Oregon Secretary of State
- In office January 9, 1899 – January 14, 1907
- Governor: T. T. Geer; George Chamberlain
- Preceded by: Harrison R. Kincaid
- Succeeded by: Frank W. Benson

Personal details
- Born: 1860 Atlantic Ocean
- Died: 1945 (aged 84–85)
- Party: Republican
- Occupation: Attorney

Frank L. Dunbar (1860–1945) was an attorney and Republican politician who served as the Oregon's Secretary of State from 1899 to 1907. In 1908, Dunbar was convicted of embezzling funds from the state of Oregon, however he was later acquitted on all charges by the Oregon Supreme Court.

== Biography ==
Dunbar was born on a ship in the Atlantic Ocean. He went to school in Brooklyn, New York, and moved to Astoria, Oregon, in 1882. Dunbar married Lilian Crosby on October 16, 1889, in Seattle, Washington.

Early during his stay in Oregon, Dunbar was worked as a grocery store clerk. He also worked as a bookkeeper. From 1890 to 1894, Dunbar worked as the county recorder and from 1894 to 1898, he worked as the county clerk. He ran for the position of Oregon Secretary of State in 1898 and won. He served from January 9, 1899, to January 14, 1907.

In 1908, Dunbar was convicted of embezzling US$100,000 from the state of Oregon. After an appeal from Dunbar, the Oregon Supreme Court overturned the ruling, clearing Dunbar from all charges.

Political offices
Preceded by Harrison R. Kincaid	Secretary of State of Oregon; 1899–1907	Succeeded by Frank W. Benson
