= William Thompson (journalist) =

American journalist

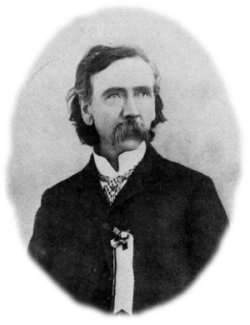
Colonel Thompson from his book Reminiscences of a Pioneer.

Col. William Thompson (1846–1934) was an American-Indian fighter and journalist, the editor of multiple newspapers in Oregon and California, having his longest run with the Alturas Plaindealer.

== Biography ==
Thompson was born in Missouri on February 2, 1846, the son of Samuel George Thompson. He immigrated to Oregon in 1852, studying at Columbia College in Eugene, Oregon before beginning a career in journalism that led him to travel extensively and, between 1870 and 1910, to be one of the few to cover the periodic incidents of internal strife that affected Central Oregon. His first work in the newspaper business was with the Eugene City Guard where he worked for a year and a half. Then he sold his stake in The Guard for $1,200 and started the Roseburg Plaindealer. In 1871, he was involved in a shootout with Henry R. Gale, the editor of a rival newspaper in Roseburg; he sustained severe injuries but survived while his opponent did not. He later wrote of the confrontation:

Theirs was an old established paper, conducted by two brothers, Henry and Thomas Gale. They soon saw their business slipping away and sought to regain it by indulging in abuse of the coarsest character. I paid no further attention to their attacks than to occasionally poke fun at them. One Saturday evening I met one of the brothers in the post office. He began an abusive harangue and attempted to draw a pistol. I quickly caught his hand and struck him in the face. Bystanders separated us and he left. I was repeatedly warned that evening to be on my guard, but gave the matter little concern. The next morning, Sunday, June 11, 1871, I went to my office as was my custom, to write my letters and attend to some other matters before going to church. On leaving the office I was joined by a young friend, Mr. Virgil Conn. As we proceeded down the street towards the post office I saw the brothers standing talking on the street. One looked up and saw me, evidently spoke to his brother, and they then started toward me. I saw at once that it was to be a fight and that I must defend myself. Some said I could have avoided a meeting by turning in a different direction. Probably I could, at least for a time, but I had started to the post office and there I intended to go. As we approached the young men, one of them dropped behind, and as I passed the first one he dealt me a blow with a heavy cane. At the same instant the other drew a pistol and fired, the bullet taking effect in my side and passing partly through. Stunned by the blow on my cheek, I reeled and drawing my pistol fired point blank at the breast of the one who had shot me. I was then between the men, and turning on the one with the cane, he threw up his hands, as if to say "I am unarmed." As I again turned he quickly drew his revolver and shot me in the back of the head, and followed it up with another shot which was aimed at the butt of my ear. I felt the muzzle of the revolver pressed against my ear, and throwing up my head the bullet entered my neck and passed up through my mouth and tongue and lodged back of my left eye. As I rushed at him he fired again, the bullet entering the point of my shoulder while another entered my body. That was his last shot.

Many gave Thompson up for dead, but with the help of a surgeon, he soon recovered. The shootout caused quite a stir and was referred to by many publications at the time as "The Oregon Style".

In 1872 Thompson sold the Roseburg Plaindealer for $4000 and took up control of the Salem Mercury, about which he wrote: "My success there as a newspaper man was all that could be desired. A large circulation was rapidly built up, and a daily as well as weekly started." His final stint in the newspaper business was with the Alturas Plaindealer, where he worked for twenty years, selling his stake in 1915 to R. A. French, his partner.

In 1912 he published his autobiography, Reminiscences of a Pioneer, which concluded:

The events here recorded were seen with my own eyes, or were received from the lips of the actors therein. Hundreds of men and boys passed through equal or greater dangers and privations than I, and are entitled to equal or greater credit. Reared in the wilderness and on the frontier of civilization, I was merely the product of environment, and lay claim to no particular distinction above those who were my companions. And yet, as I look back over the past, I must be excused for a feeling of pride in having been a part, however insignificant, in the building here on the western rim of the continent, of the mighty Empire of the Pacific.

To have seen proud cities rear their heads from a wilderness—from a cluster of log huts in a primeval forest—whose everlasting stillness was alone broken by the yells of savage men, the long howl of the wolf and the scream of the panther—is something to have lived for.

And yet I question if those who now possess this land of plenty—this land of "milk and honey" ever give a thought for those who "Conquered the Wilderness" and made it a fit and safe abode for the millions of civilized men and women who now enjoy its blessings.

Thompson married Elizabeth Charlotte Shannon in August 1869. They were married until her death in 1919 and had two children, Asher and Sallie. He died on May 24, 1934, of bronchial pneumonia at his home in Alturas.
