= Frank W. Benson (politician) =

American politician

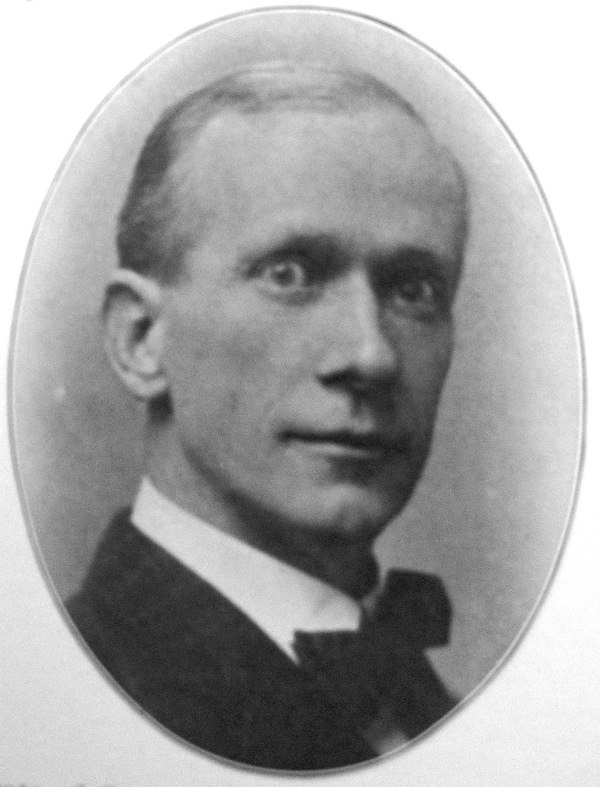
- Benson circa 1910

12th Governor of Oregon
- In office March 1, 1909 – June 17, 1910
- Preceded by: George Chamberlain
- Succeeded by: Jay Bowerman

8th Secretary of State of Oregon
- In office January 15, 1907 – April 14, 1911
- Governor: George Chamberlain
- Preceded by: Frank L. Dunbar
- Succeeded by: Ben W. Olcott

Personal details
- Born: March 20, 1858 San Jose, California, US
- Died: April 14, 1911 (aged 53) Redlands, California, US
- Party: Republican
- Spouse: Harriet Ruth Benson
- Profession: Lawyer

Frank Williamson Benson (March 20, 1858 – April 14, 1911) was an American politician, a Republican, and the 12th governor of Oregon from 1909 to 1910. A native of California, Benson also served as educator, a land office clerk, and was twice elected as Oregon Secretary of State. From this position he became governor after sitting governor George Earle Chamberlain resigned to become a United States senator.

== Early life ==
Benson was born in San Jose, California, in 1858 to a minister sent west by the Methodist Episcopal Church. His father, Henry Clarke Benson, moved the family to Portland, Oregon, to become editor of the Pacific Christian Accord in 1864. His mother was Matilda Williamson Benson, and his older brother Henry Landin Benson was speaker of the Oregon House of Representatives and served on the Oregon Supreme Court.

Young Frank enrolled in the Portland Academy, and completed his education at the California Wesleyan College (now University of the Pacific in Stockton, California), where he earned an A.B. in 1877, and an A.M. degree in 1882. After college, he returned to Oregon, and began a career in education. In 1880, he became the administrator of the Umpqua Academy in Wilbur, Oregon, a Methodist school that is now closed. Benson was elected Superintendent of Douglas County Schools in 1882, but resigned the next year to become president of the now defunct Normal School in Drain. In 1883, Benson married Harriet Ruth Benjamin, and they had two sons. Benson served as the clerk of the U.S. Land Office in Roseburg from 1894 to 1896.

Benson was elected Douglas County Clerk in 1892, and was re-elected in 1896. That year he passed the state bar exam, and he began practicing law in Roseburg in 1898.

== Secretary of State and Governorship ==
In 1906, Benson ran for secretary of state as a Republican, and was elected. Governor George Earle Chamberlain was elected to the United States Senate halfway through his term in 1909 and resigned as governor. As secretary of state, Frank Benson was next in the gubernatorial line of succession, and was sworn into office March 1, 1909. (There is no lieutenant governor position under the state of Oregon's constitution.)

Benson did not resign as secretary of state, and held both positions in violation of the Oregon Constitution. (Previously, Governor Stephen F. Chadwick succeeded to the office of governor under similar circumstances in 1877, and held both offices simultaneously in contravention of state law.) Benson collected pay for both offices.

As governor, Benson initiated little despite holding the state's two most powerful offices. He did call for a special session of the Oregon Legislative Assembly to fund the operation of certain state institutions, including the state's prison, reform school, mental hospital, school for the blind, and veteran's home. The legislation had been overlooked in the previous (25th Biennial) Session. Benson attempted to resolve a boundary dispute with neighboring Washington.

Benson was ill when he assumed the office of governor, but his health appeared to improve. In 1910, he traveled to California for further treatment. On June 15, 1910, Benson telephoned his private secretary, and transferred the governor's powers to Oregon State Senate President Jay Bowerman until he could return to Salem, which he anticipated would be by July 20, 1910. Bowerman was sworn in as acting governor on June 16, 1910. However, Benson did not return and remained in California till his death. Bowerman completed the term as governor. In the fall 1910 election, Benson did not seek a full term of office as governor, but he was elected to another term as Secretary of State. His health failed in Redlands, California, and he died on April 14, 1911.

== Sources ==
- in the Biographical Directory of the Governors of the United States 1789 - 1978. Volume 3 (Montana-Pennsylvania) Edited by Robert Sobel and John Raimo. Meckler Books, 1978. pp 1271–1272. Copyright © 1996 Mecklermedia Corporation.
- Klooster, Karl. Round the Roses II: More Past Portland Perspectives, pg. 115, 1992 ISBN 0-9619847-1-6

Political offices
Preceded by Frank L. Dunbar	Secretary of State of Oregon; 1907–1911	Succeeded by Ben W. Olcott
Preceded by George Earle Chamberlain	Governor of Oregon; 1909–1910	Succeeded by Jay Bowerman
