= Albin Norblad =

Albin Norblad may refer to:

- A. W. Norblad (1881–1960), governor of Oregon
- A. Walter Norblad (1908–1964), American attorney and politician in Oregon
- Albin W. Norblad (1939–2014), American attorney and judge in Oregon
