= 1930 Oregon gubernatorial election =

- November 4, 1930
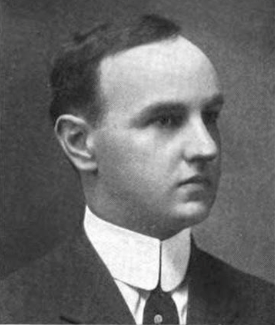

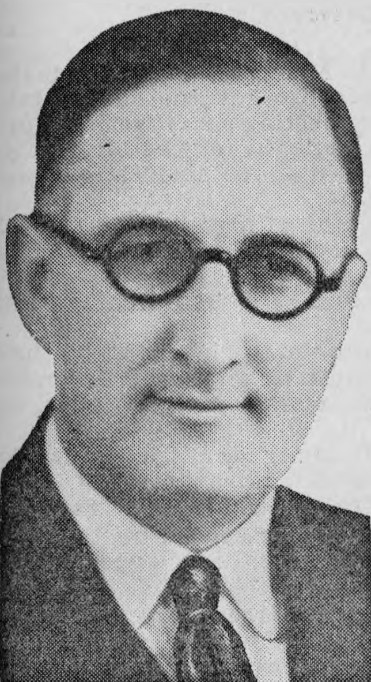

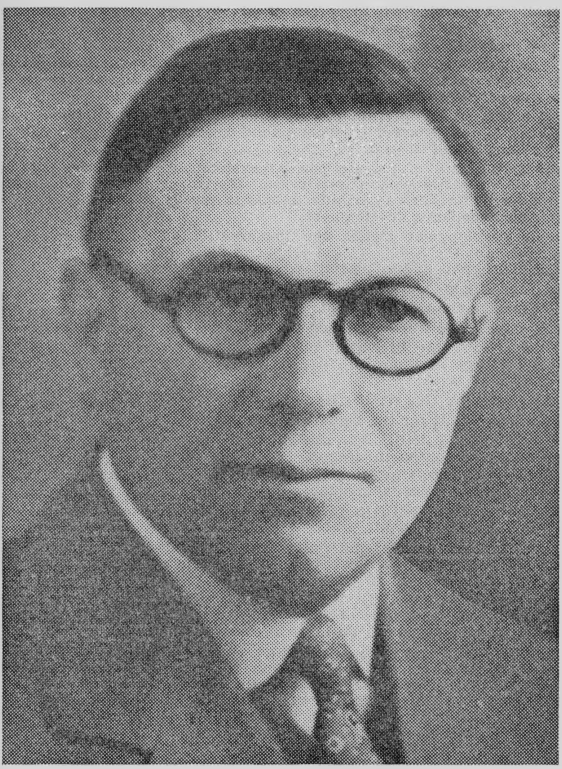
Nominee	Julius Meier	Edward F. Bailey	Phil Metschan Jr.
Party	Independent	Democratic	Republican
Popular vote	135,608	62,434	46,480
Percentage	54.51%	25.09%	18.83%
- County results Meier: 30–40% 40–50% 50–60% 60–70% 70–80% Bailey: 30–40% 40–50% 50–60% Metschan: 30–40%
Governor before election
A. W. Norblad
Republican
Elected Governor
Julius Meier
Independent

The 1930 Oregon gubernatorial election took place on November 4, 1930, to elect the governor of the U.S. state of Oregon. The Oregon Republican Party, at the time dominant in Oregon politics, initially nominated George W. Joseph, but the nominee died prior to the general election. Joseph's former law partner Julius Meier entered the race as an independent, and defeated replacement Republican nominee Phil Metschan, Jr., Democrat Edward F. Bailey, and Socialist Albert Streiff to become the first and only independent politician to be elected Governor of Oregon.

== Primary election ==
Oregon held primary elections on May 16, 1930.

=== Republican primary ===
George W. Joseph won the Republican nomination, but died shortly after. The Republican Party selected Phil Metschan, Jr., son of former Oregon State Treasurer Phil Metschan, as a replacement nominee. Unlike Joseph, Metschan opposed public development of hydroelectric power along the Columbia River.

==== Candidates ====
- J. E. Bennett, member of Oregon State Senate
- Harry L. Corbett, member of Oregon State Senate
- Charles Hall, member of Oregon State Senate
- John A. Jeffrey, attorney
- George W. Joseph, former member of Oregon State Senate
- A. W. Norblad, incumbent governor

==== Results ====
Republican primary results
Party	Candidate	Votes	%
Republican	George W. Joseph	50,545	34.94%
Republican	A. W. Norblad (inc.)	46,074	31.85%
Republican	Harry L. Corbett	33,861	23.41%
Republican	Charles Hall	9,235	6.38%
Republican	J. E. Bennett	3,426	2.37%
Republican	John A. Jeffrey	1,510	1.04%
Republican	Scattering	8	0.01%
Total votes		144,659	100.00%

=== Democratic party ===
The Democrats selected State Senator Edward F. Bailey of Lane County.

==== Candidates ====
- Edward F. Bailey, member of Oregon State Senate
- A. C. Hough, attorney
- Edward S. Piper
- George R. Wilbur, member of Oregon State Senate

==== Results ====
Democratic primary results
Party	Candidate	Votes	%
Democratic	Edward F. Bailey	11,939	39.10%
Democratic	George R. Wilbur	10,388	34.02%
Democratic	Edward S. Piper	4,395	14.39%
Democratic	A. C. Hough	2,679	8.77%
Democratic	Scattering	1,134	3.71%
Total votes		30,535	100.00%

== General election ==
=== Campagain ===
With a key platform of Joseph's campaign now directly opposed by the replacement nominee, Julius Meier, Joseph's former law partner, friend, and general manager of the Meier and Frank department store, agreed to enter the race as an Independent candidate with Joseph's platform. Although opposed by the state's largest newspaper, The Oregonian, Meier won a resounding victory over Metschan and Bailey. Meier's victory was viewed as indicating strong public support for public hydropower development.

=== Results ===
1930 Oregon gubernatorial election
Party	Candidate	Votes	%	±%
Independent	Julius Meier	135,608	54.51%	
Democratic	Edward F. Bailey	62,434	25.09%	−16.27%
Republican	Phil Metschan Jr.	46,480	18.83%	−34.32%
Socialist	Albert Streiff	3,911	1.57%	
Write-in	Scattering	2	0.00%	
Total votes		248,795	100.00%	
Majority		73,174	29.41%	
Independent gain from Republican		Swing	+17.64%	

=== Results by county ===
County	Julius Meier Independent		Edward F. Bailey Democratic		Phil Metschan Jr. Republican		Albert Streiff Socialist		Margin (Note: Meier over Bailey unless otherwise noted)		Total votes cast
County	#	%	#	%	#	%	#	%	#	%	Total votes cast
Baker	1,851	41.12%	1,475	32.76%	1,108	24.61%	68	1.51%	376	8.35%	4,502
Benton	1,236	24.66%	1,963	39.17%	1,764	35.20%	49	0.98%	-199 (Note: Bailey's margin over Metschan)	-3.97%	5,012
Clackamas	8,005	64.34%	2,258	18.15%	1,896	15.24%	282	2.27%	5,747	46.19%	12,441
Clatsop	2,285	41.75%	1,928	35.23%	1,160	21.19%	100	1.83%	357	6.52%	5,473
Columbia	2,411	56.70%	922	21.68%	822	19.33%	97	2.28%	1,489	35.02%	4,252
Coos	3,298	49.35%	2,046	30.61%	1,237	18.51%	102	1.53%	1,252	18.73%	6,683
Crook	498	40.19%	446	36.00%	290	23.41%	5	0.40%	52	4.20%	1,239
Curry	442	38.81%	422	37.05%	23	20.46%	42	3.69%	20	1.76%	1,139
Deschutes	1,746	53.39%	798	24.40%	699	21.38%	27	0.83%	948	28.99%	3,270
Douglas	2,361	38.92%	2,260	37.26%	1,374	22.65%	71	1.17%	101	1.67%	6,066
Gilliam	391	42.27%	293	31.68%	237	25.62%	4	0.43%	98	10.59%	925
Grant	609	36.16%	491	29.16%	566	33.61%	17	1.01%	43 (Note: Meier's margin over Metschan)	2.55%	1,684 (Note: Includes 1 Scattering vote)
Harney	418	34.49%	330	27.23%	452	37.29%	12	0.99%	-34 (Note: Metschan's margin over Meier)	-2.81%	1,212
Hood River	923	45.45%	658	32.40%	434	21.37%	15	0.74%	265	13.05%	2,031
Jackson	3,453	40.42%	2,310	27.04%	2,666	31.21%	113	1.32%	787	9.21%	8,542
Jefferson	253	41.41%	183	29.95%	162	26.51%	13	2.13%	70	11.46%	611
Josephine	1,562	54.96%	609	21.43%	633	22.27%	38	1.34%	929	32.69%	2,842
Klamath	2,998	48.49%	1,410	22.80%	1,681	27.19%	94	1.52%	1,317	21.30%	6,183
Lake	694	42.71%	376	23.14%	542	33.35%	13	0.80%	152	9.35%	1,625
Lane	2,775	22.34%	7,117	57.30%	2,334	18.79%	194	1.56%	-4,342	-34.96%	12,420
Lincoln	991	36.19%	1,050	38.35%	645	23.56%	52	1.90%	-59	-2.15%	2,738
Linn	2,316	31.89%	3,342	46.01%	1,546	21.29%	59	0.81%	-1,026	-14.13%	7,263
Malheur	889	36.69%	679	28.02%	828	34.17%	27	1.11%	61	2.52%	2,423
Marion	6,777	46.05%	4,935	33.53%	2,833	19.25%	173	1.18%	1,842	12.52%	14,718
Morrow	510	36.96%	487	35.29%	370	26.81%	13	0.94%	23	1.67%	1,380
Multnomah	68,121	71.87%	12,036	12.70%	12,855	13.56%	1,775	1.87%	55,266	58.31%	94,787
Polk	1,554	36.75%	1,788	42.56%	807	19.21%	62	1.48%	-244	-5.81%	4,201
Sherman	349	38.14%	297	32.46%	262	28.63%	7	0.77%	52	5.68%	915
Tillamook	1,415	49.48%	878	30.70%	522	18.25%	45	1.57%	537	18.78%	2,860
Umatilla	2,119	38.78%	2,079	38.05%	1,213	22.20%	53	0.97%	40	0.73%	5,464
Union	2,022	50.59%	1,220	30.52%	710	17.76%	45	1.13%	802	20.07%	3,997
Wallowa	838	42.78%	644	32.87%	457	23.33%	20	1.02%	194	9.90%	1,959
Wasco	1,450	44.02%	778	23.62%	1,038	31.51%	28	0.85%	412	12.51%	3,294
Washington	5,016	67.34%	1,239	16.63%	1,080	14.50%	114	1.53%	3,777	50.70%	7,449
Wheeler	339	31.68%	291	27.20%	427	39.91%	13	1.21%	-88	-8.22%	1,070
Yamhill	2,703	44.13%	2,396	39.12%	957	15.62%	69	1.13%	307	5.01%	6,125
Total	135,608	54.51%	62,434	25.09%	46,840	18.83%	3,911	1.57%	73,174	29.41%	248,795

==== Counties that flipped from Democratic to Independent ====
- Baker
- Crook
- Curry
- Gilliam
- Hood River
- Josephine
- Malheur
- Morrow
- Sherman
- Umatilla
- Union
- Wallowa

==== Counties that flipped from Republican to Independent ====
- Clackamas
- Clatsop
- Columbia
- Coos
- Deschutes
- Douglas
- Grant
- Jackson
- Jefferson
- Klamath
- Lake
- Marion
- Multnomah
- Tillamook
- Wasco
- Washington
- Yamhill

==== Counties that flipped from Republican to Democratic ====
- Benton
- Lane
- Lincoln

==== Counties that flipped from Democratic to Republican ====
- Harney
- Wheeler
