= 1938 Oregon gubernatorial election =

- November 8, 1938
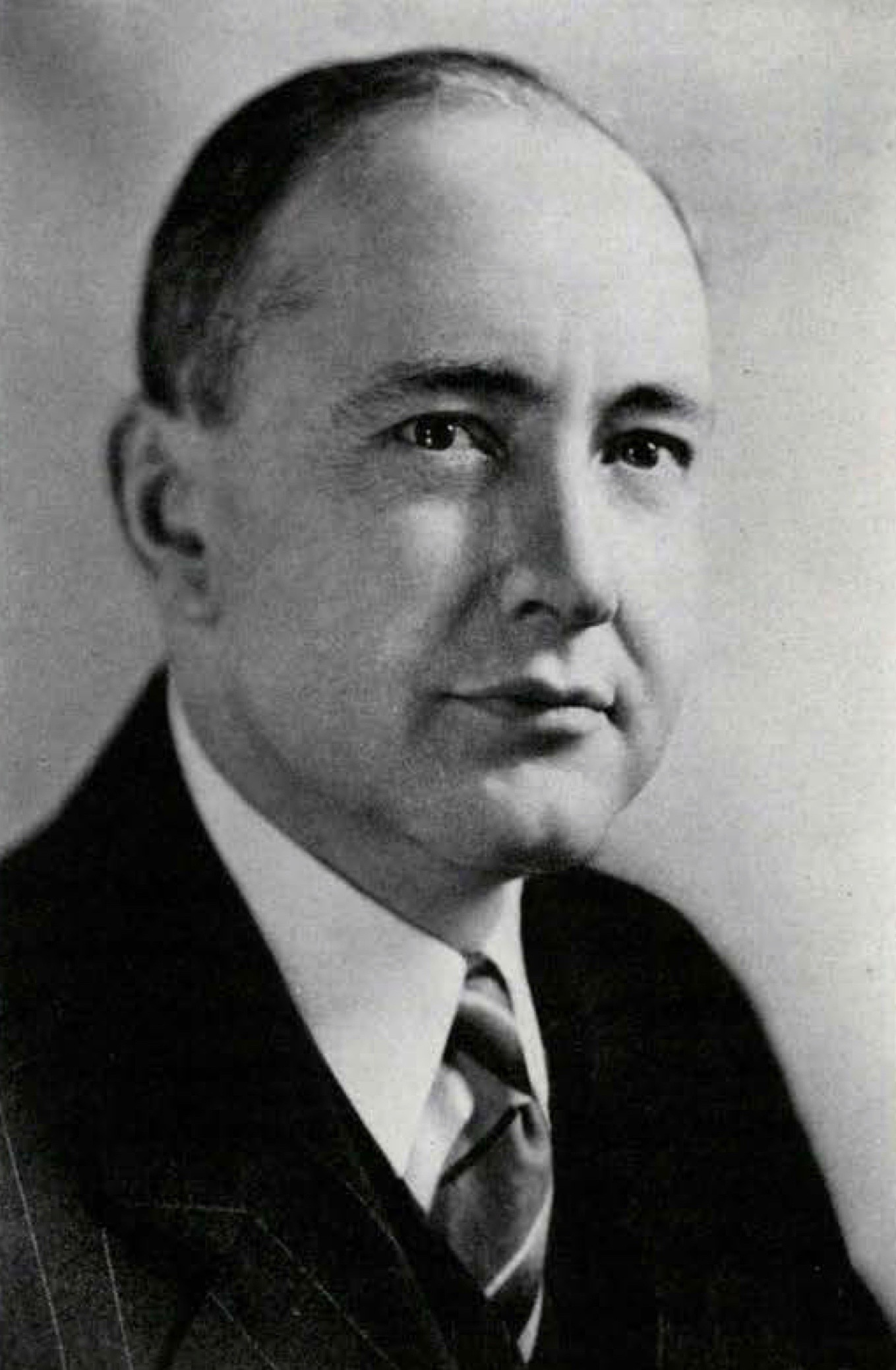

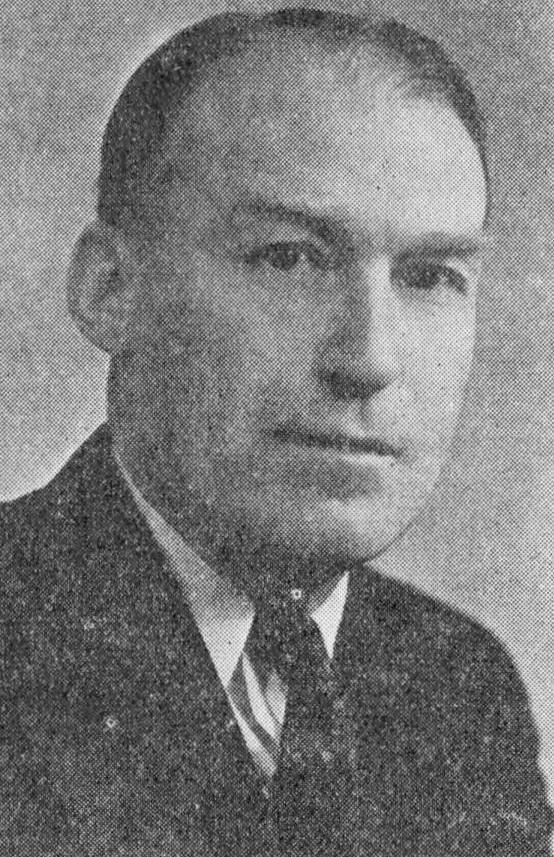
| Nominee | Charles A. Sprague | Henry L. Hess |
| Party | Republican | Democratic |
| Popular vote | 214,062 | 158,744 |
| Percentage | 57.41% | 42.57% |
- County results: Sprague: 50–60% 60–70% 70–80% Hess: 50–60%
Governor before election
Charles H. Martin
Democratic
Elected Governor
Charles A. Sprague
Republican

The 1938 Oregon gubernatorial election took place on November 8, 1938. In the election for governor of Oregon, Republican nominee Charles A. Sprague defeated Democratic nominee Henry L. Hess. Incumbent governor Charles Martin lost in the Democratic primary to Hess, an attorney and former state senator from La Grande. Hess was a strong supporter of President Franklin Delano Roosevelt's New Deal while Martin was a frequent critic of the program.

== Primary election ==
Oregon held primary elections on May 20, 1938.

=== Democratic party ===
==== Candidates ====
- Henry L. Hess, former member of Oregon State Senate
- Charles H. Martin, incumbent governor
- O. Henry Oleen, member of Oregon House of Representatives

==== Campaign ====
Incumbent Democratic governor Charles Martin had been elected in the middle of the Great Depression in the 1934 governor's race. A conservative Democrat, Martin appealed to many business-minded Republicans, and his administration focused on strengthening state finances, even opposing restoring state workers to full pay as the Depression eased. Martin vigorously opposed many aspects of President Roosevelt's New Deal, in particular parts dealing with unions and labor, such as the formation of the National Labor Relations Board.

When Martin announced his intention to run for the Democratic nomination for another term, labor unions and the Roosevelt administration sought an alternative, eventually throwing their weight behind Henry L. Hess, a little-known attorney and former state senator from Union County. Harold L. Ickes, Roosevelt's Secretary of the Interior and a key implementer of New Deal policies, indicated his support for Hess, though Roosevelt himself stayed officially neutral.

In a hard-fought Democratic primary, Hess won 49% of the vote to Martin's 44%, with labor strongholds in Portland and the timber counties supporting Hess and agricultural regions behind Martin. A third candidate, O. Henry Oleen, a state representative from St. Helens, earned about 7% of the vote.

==== Results ====
Democratic primary results
| Party | Candidate | Votes | % |
|---|---|---|---|
| Democratic | Henry L. Hess | 59,620 | 49.43% |
| Democratic | Charles H. Martin (inc.) | 52,642 | 43.65% |
| Democratic | O. Henry Oleen | 8,220 | 6.82% |
| Democratic | Scattering | 121 | 0.10% |
| Total votes | | 120,603 | 100.00% |

=== Republican party ===
With most of the attention on the Democratic primary, on the Republican side, newspaper publisher Charles A. Sprague emerged from a crowded eight-way Republican field with a comfortable plurality of 48% of the vote, 30 percentage points better than his nearest competitor, former state senator Sam H. Brown.

==== Candidates ====
- Sam H. Brown, forner member of Oregon State Senate
- Henry M. Hanzen, former State Budget Director under Julius Meier
- R. J. Hendricks, newspaper publisher
- J. W. Morton
- Charles L. Paine, real estate businessman
- M. S. Schrock
- Charles A. Sprague, publisher of the Oregon Statesman
- Clarence R. Wagoner

==== Results ====
Republican primary results
| Party | Candidate | Votes | % |
|---|---|---|---|
| Republican | Charles A. Sprague | 62,275 | 47.53% |
| Republican | Sam H. Brown | 24,028 | 18.34% |
| Republican | Clarence R. Wagoner | 12,086 | 9.22% |
| Republican | Charles L. Paine | 9,862 | 7.53% |
| Republican | Henry M. Hanzen | 6,153 | 4.70% |
| Republican | J. W. Morton | 5,702 | 4.35% |
| Republican | M. S. Schrock | 3,881 | 2.96% |
| Republican | Charles H. Martin (write-in) | 3,780 | 2.89% |
| Republican | R. J. Hendricks | 2,871 | 2.19% |
| Republican | Henry L. Hess (write-in) | 355 | 0.27% |
| Republican | O. Henry Oleen (write-in) | 27 | 0.02% |
| Republican | Scattering | 2 | 0.00% |
| Total votes | | 131,022 | 100.00% |

== General election ==
=== Campaign ===
In the general election, the Republican establishment, which had supported Martin, now threw their support to Sprague, who cruised to an easy victory.

=== Results ===
1938 Oregon gubernatorial election
| Party | Candidate | Votes | % | ±% |
|---|---|---|---|---|
| Republican | Charles A. Sprague | 214,062 | 57.41% | +28.68% |
| Democratic | Henry L. Hess | 158,744 | 42.57% | +4.01% |
| Write-in | Scattering | 57 | 0.02% | |
| Total votes | | 372,863 | 100.00% | |
| Majority | | 55,318 | 14.84% | |
| Republican gain from Democratic | | Swing | +21.83% | |

=== Results by county ===
Linn County voted Republican for the first time since 1894. Deschutes County would not vote Democratic again until 1974.

| County | Charles A. Sprague Republican | | Henry L. Hess Democratic | | Scattering Write-in | | Margin | | Total votes cast |
| County | # | % | # | % | # | % | # | % | Total votes cast |
|---|---|---|---|---|---|---|---|---|---|
| Baker | 3,402 | 54.23% | 2,871 | 45.77% | 0 | 0.00% | 531 | 8.46% | 6,273 |
| Benton | 4,689 | 74.58% | 1,593 | 25.34% | 5 | 0.08% | 3,096 | 49.24% | 6,287 |
| Clackamas | 11,116 | 53.84% | 9,529 | 46.16% | 0 | 0.00% | 1,587 | 7.69% | 20,645 |
| Clatsop | 4,091 | 51.52% | 3,845 | 48.43% | 4 | 0.05% | 246 | 3.10% | 7,940 |
| Columbia | 3,095 | 44.18% | 3,911 | 55.82% | 0 | 0.00% | -816 | -11.65% | 7,006 |
| Coos | 4,812 | 49.30% | 4,948 | 50.69% | 1 | 0.01% | -136 | -1.39% | 9,761 |
| Crook | 841 | 61.03% | 537 | 38.97% | 0 | 0.00% | 304 | 22.06% | 1,378 |
| Curry | 891 | 63.69% | 508 | 36.31% | 0 | 0.00% | 383 | 27.38% | 1,399 |
| Deschutes | 2,498 | 48.19% | 2,685 | 51.79% | 1 | 0.02% | -187 | -3.61% | 5,184 |
| Douglas | 5,415 | 63.11% | 3,165 | 36.89% | 0 | 0.00% | 2,250 | 26.22% | 8,580 |
| Gilliam | 722 | 69.22% | 320 | 30.68% | 1 | 0.10% | 402 | 38.54% | 1,043 |
| Grant | 1,053 | 63.05% | 617 | 36.95% | 0 | 0.00% | 436 | 26.11% | 1,670 |
| Harney | 756 | 55.83% | 598 | 44.17% | 0 | 0.00% | 158 | 11.67% | 1,354 |
| Hood River | 2,264 | 63.42% | 1,302 | 36.47% | 4 | 0.11% | 962 | 26.95% | 3,570 |
| Jackson | 6,523 | 58.89% | 4,548 | 41.06% | 6 | 0.05% | 1,975 | 17.83% | 11,077 |
| Jefferson | 406 | 63.94% | 229 | 36.06% | 0 | 0.00% | 177 | 27.87% | 635 |
| Josephine | 3,406 | 61.95% | 2,080 | 37.83% | 12 | 0.22% | 1,326 | 24.12% | 5,498 |
| Klamath | 5,879 | 55.77% | 4,662 | 44.23% | 0 | 0.00% | 1,217 | 11.55% | 10,541 |
| Lake | 1,198 | 65.72% | 625 | 34.28% | 0 | 0.00% | 573 | 31.43% | 1,823 |
| Lane | 13,840 | 63.00% | 8,127 | 37.00% | 0 | 0.00% | 5,713 | 26.01% | 21,967 |
| Lincoln | 3,459 | 58.95% | 2,407 | 41.02% | 2 | 0.03% | 1,052 | 17.93% | 5,868 |
| Linn | 6,119 | 59.12% | 4,232 | 40.88% | 0 | 0.00% | 1,887 | 18.23% | 10,351 |
| Malheur | 2,086 | 52.28% | 1,904 | 47.72% | 0 | 0.00% | 182 | 4.56% | 3,990 |
| Marion | 16,473 | 65.44% | 8,687 | 34.51% | 12 | 0.05% | 7,786 | 30.93% | 25,172 |
| Morrow | 900 | 60.65% | 584 | 39.35% | 0 | 0.00% | 316 | 21.29% | 1,484 |
| Multnomah | 74,320 | 54.37% | 62,363 | 45.63% | 0 | 0.00% | 11,957 | 8.75% | 136,683 |
| Polk | 3,790 | 63.44% | 2,184 | 36.56% | 0 | 0.00% | 1,606 | 26.88% | 5,974 |
| Sherman | 694 | 70.03% | 297 | 29.97% | 0 | 0.00% | 397 | 40.06% | 991 |
| Tillamook | 2,740 | 60.22% | 1,810 | 39.78% | 0 | 0.00% | 930 | 20.44% | 4,550 |
| Umatilla | 5,251 | 66.68% | 2,624 | 33.32% | 0 | 0.00% | 2,627 | 33.36% | 7,785 |
| Union | 2,923 | 47.23% | 3,266 | 52.77% | 0 | 0.00% | -343 | -5.54% | 6,189 |
| Wallowa | 1,613 | 60.64% | 1,047 | 39.36% | 0 | 0.00% | 566 | 21.28% | 2,660 |
| Wasco | 2,723 | 62.13% | 1,658 | 37.83% | 2 | 0.05% | 1,065 | 24.30% | 4,383 |
| Washington | 7,667 | 59.02% | 5,317 | 40.93% | 7 | 0.05% | 2,350 | 18.09% | 12,991 |
| Wheeler | 593 | 70.51% | 248 | 29.49% | 0 | 0.00% | 345 | 41.02% | 841 |
| Yamhill | 5,814 | 62.99% | 3,416 | 37.01% | 0 | 0.00% | 2,398 | 25.98% | 9,230 |
| Total | 214,062 | 57.41% | 158,744 | 42.57% | 57 | 0.02% | 55,318 | 14.84% | 372,863 |

==== Counties that flipped from Democratic to Republican ====
- Baker
- Clatsop
- Curry
- Gilliam
- Harney
- Hood River
- Jackson
- Jefferson
- Josephine
- Lake
- Lane
- Linn
- Malheur
- Morrow
- Multnomah
- Polk
- Sherman
- Umatilla
- Wasco

==== Counties that flipped from Independent to Republican ====
- Clackamas
- Lincoln
- Marion
- Tillamook
- Wallowa
- Washington
- Yamhill

==== Counties that flipped from Independent to Democratic ====
- Columbia
