= Governor Sprague =

Governor Sprague may refer to:

- Charles A. Sprague (1887–1969), 22nd Governor of Oregon
- William Sprague III (1799–1856), 14th Governor of Rhode Island
- William Sprague IV (1830–1915), 27th Governor of Rhode Island, nephew of William Sprague III
