= Charles A. Sprague =

22nd Governor of Oregon

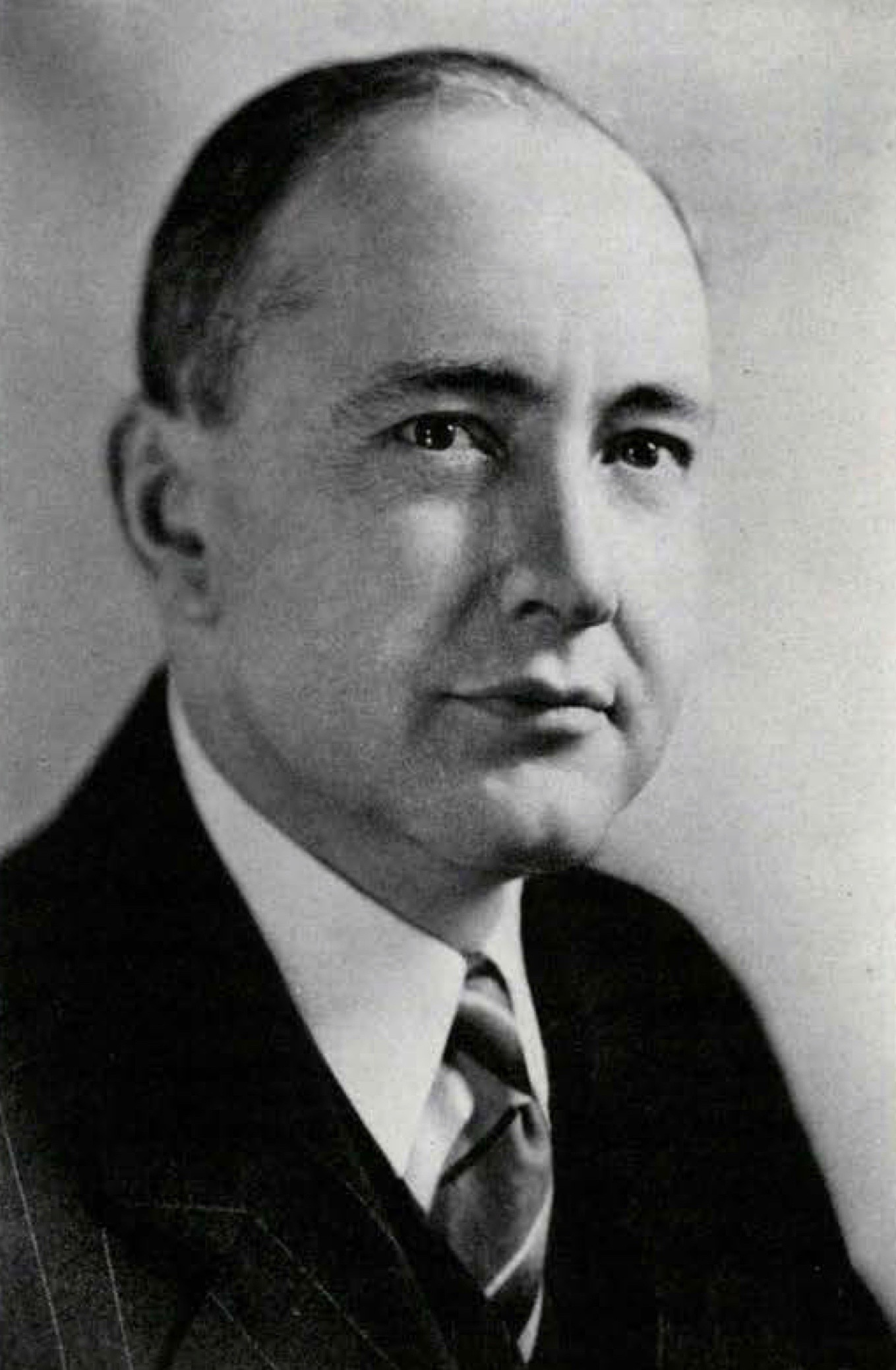

22nd Governor of Oregon
- In office January 9, 1939 – January 11, 1943
- Preceded by: Charles H. Martin
- Succeeded by: Earl Snell

Personal details
- Born: November 12, 1887 Lawrence, Kansas
- Died: March 13, 1969 (aged 81) Salem, Oregon
- Resting place: Mount Crest Abbey Mausoleum, Salem, Oregon
- Party: Republican
- Spouse: Blanche Chamberlain
- Education: Monmouth College
- Profession: Politician

Charles Arthur Sprague (November 12, 1887 – March 13, 1969) was the 22nd governor of Oregon from 1939 to 1943. He was also the editor and publisher of the Oregon Statesman from 1929 to 1969. Sprague High School in Salem, Oregon is named after him.

He was also a direct descendant to two Rhode Island governors, William Sprague III and William Sprague IV.

== Early years ==
Charles Sprague was born in Lawrence, Kansas, the son of Charles Allen Sprague, a grain-elevator operator, and Caroline Glasgow. He grew up with his brother, Robert Wyatt, in Columbus Junction, Iowa, where he attended public schools and worked for his father. He enrolled at Monmouth College in Illinois and paid his expenses by reporting part-time for regional newspapers. When his income proved inadequate, Sprague took a leave at the end of his sophomore year and spent two years as a high school principal and teacher in Ainsworth, Iowa. On his return to Monmouth, Sprague served as editor of the student newspaper. From then on, he had aspirations to go into journalism. Following his graduation with honors in 1910, Sprague became superintendent of schools in Waitsburg, Washington. Two years later, he married Blanche Chamberlain, the principal of a local grade school; they had two children. Sprague was soon named assistant superintendent of public instruction for the state of Washington.

== Becomes a public figure ==
In 1925 he moved to Oregon and acquired a one-third interest and became the business manager of the Corvallis Gazette Times, and four years later, purchased a two-thirds interest in the Oregon Statesman, which later was the most influential newspaper in the capital city of Salem. For the next forty years, he was its editor and publisher. In 1955 Sprague received the Elijah Parish Lovejoy Award as well as an honorary Doctor of Laws degree from Colby College. Sprague established himself as one of the leading editorialists and public commentators of the Pacific Northwest, and his editorials were often reprinted in some of America's largest newspapers. Sprague gained a national reputation as an articulate spokesman for small-town values, fiscal conservatism, and internationalism. He held control of the paper until his death. A declared Republican, he nonetheless took an independent position on the issues of the time, reflecting a progressive view which was often at odds with leaders of his party.

In 1938 Republicans were hesitant to challenge the Democratic incumbent governor Charles H. Martin, who had strong Republican business support. As a result, Sprague easily won the Republican nomination for governor in a field of eight candidates. In the meantime, however, Martin was a New Deal critic and was opposed in his own primary by the Roosevelt administration's choice, State Senator Henry Hess. Taking advantage of the split among the Democrats, Sprague made the administrations' intervention a major campaign theme, urging voters to "repudiate outside interference in local affairs." Martin and his allies campaigned for Sprague. Contrary to his entry as a sacrificial lamb, Sprague won decisively, carrying 32 of the 36 counties in the general election, winning 214,062 votes to Hess' 158,744. Republicans also won control of the Oregon State Senate, 21 to 9, and the House, 50 to 10.

Sprague was also appointed as an alternate delegate to the United Nations.

== Term as governor ==
As governor, Sprague invoked the populist legacy of George W. Joseph and Julius Meier. With backing from both labor and industry, he moved quickly to improve the state's employment services and launched vocational-training programs to aid the jobless in efforts to lift Oregon out of the Great Depression. He modernized the state school system by pushing through legislation that provided for the consolidation of rural school districts. He reduced the state debt by $12 million and balanced the budget while increasing social welfare services. Sprague helped maintain peace in labor disputes by his forthright opposition to an anti-picketing law that was later held to be unconstitutional by the Oregon Supreme Court. He lost the political backing of organized labor, though, as a result of his policy of awarding state contracts to the lowest bidder, whether or not they were union firms.

Republicans expected smooth sailing legislatively and politically. Nevertheless, he vetoed so many special interest bills passed by his fellow Republicans that opponents initiated a recall move. It failed, but Sprague's effectiveness had been reduced.

During Sprague's administration, Oregon became the first state to initiate control over logging operations to insure enforcement of progressive forest practices. These practices included protection of trees from slash burns, not harvesting immature trees during cutting operations, and retaining some mature trees for seeding purposes. In addition, a state forestry research program was adopted. He also established a forestry research program and obtained authority for the state to acquire abandoned cut over land for replanting. "Wise handling of natural forest lands," he declared, "calls for their consolidation under public ownership except for those lands in the hands of strong private interests capable of carrying them through long growing periods."

Have had some complaints that Japanese-American citizens were being interfered with in employment at lumber mills. Kindly request your deputies to protect citizens from molestation unless guilty of acts of disloyalty. Enemy aliens should remain at home pending further federal instructions.

— Charles Sprague, telegram to Portland mayor Earl Riley and to the Multnomah County Sheriff

As pressure built towards the start of World War II, Sprague attempted to moderate opinions and attitudes towards Japanese people. The 1942 gubernatorial campaign began as Pearl Harbor was bombed. On the day of the bombing he commanded Japanese Issei to remain at home and called on Oregonians not to harass the Japanese-Americans (including the Issei). Sprague continued to defend the Japanese until fellow Republican (and current Secretary of State) Earl Snell entered the primary. Sprague moved rightward, but by mid-February he "urge[d] further and prompt action to remove this menace and recommend internment." Days later President Roosevelt signed Executive Order 9066 to force internment. Sprague didn't include his opinions or political stands on the issue in his campaign, and it wasn't reported on in the news.

In any case, Sprague lost the primary to Snell, who went on to be elected Governor. Sprague felt a deep sense of loss, and later regretted his change of opinion against the Japanese Americans. He supported the return of Japanese American evacuees and the restoration of their property in December 1944, defended them in meetings, and even received an imperial decoration from Hirohito "for distinguished service in Japanese affairs" shortly before his death.

In 1944 Sprague attempted to run for a US Senate seat in 1944, but lost in the Republican primary to Guy Cordon, who was elected.

== Death and legacy ==
Sprague died on March 13, 1969. Sprague and his wife are interred in Mount Crest Abbey Mausoleum, in Salem, Oregon.

The Salem-Keizer School District named Charles A. Sprague High School, known as Sprague High School, in his honor in 1972.

== See also ==
- Sprague Fountain, Salem

Political offices
Preceded by Charles H. Martin	Governor of Oregon; 1939–1943	Succeeded by Earl Snell
Party political offices
Preceded by Joe E. Dunne	Republican nominee for Governor of Oregon; 1938	Succeeded by Earl Snell
