= Albin W. Norblad =

American attorney and judge (1939–2014)

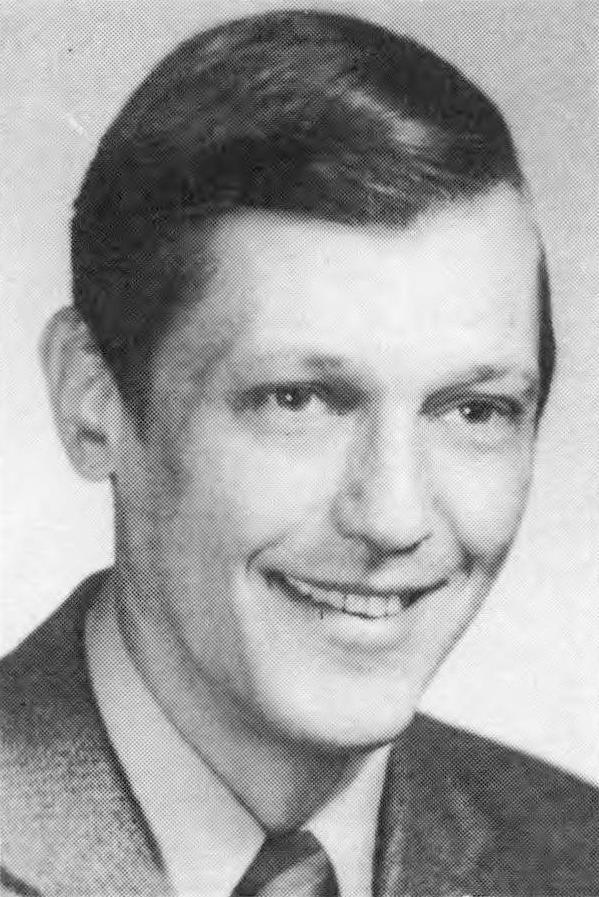

Judge for the Marion County Circuit Court
- In office 1973–2014

Personal details
- Born: Albin Walter Norblad III; March 15, 1939 Astoria, Oregon
- Died: February 10, 2014 (aged 74) Salem, Oregon
- Education: University of Oregon; Willamette University College of Law

Albin Walter Norblad III (March 15, 1939 – February 10, 2014) was an attorney in the U.S. state of Oregon, and a judge of the Oregon Circuit Court for the 3rd judicial district, in Marion County at Salem. He was named for his father, A. Walter Norblad, and grandfather, A. W. Norblad, both prominent Oregon attorneys and politicians.

== Early life ==
Norblad was born in Astoria, Oregon in 1939, and moved with his family to Stayton, Oregon in 1953. After a United States Army discharge in 1958 and a year's study at Georgetown University, Norblad obtained a bachelor's degree in history from the University of Oregon in 1963, and a law degree from the Willamette University in 1965. Norblad's father died in office in 1964, and Norblad considered running for his seat in the United States House of Representatives, however Wendell Wyatt was elected instead.

== Legal career ==
Before becoming a state court judge, Norblad served as a municipal court judge and a deputy district attorney.

His lengthy career as a jurist included a number of controversial and high-profile cases, including a 1994 decision upholding a state law banning enforcement of local anti-gay rights ordinances. As a juvenile court judge during the 1970s, Norblad made hundreds of unpopular decisions, reportedly sending more youths to MacLaren Youth Correctional Facility than any other judge in the state.

The judge was disciplined by the Oregon Commission on Judicial Fitness and Disability in 2002 with a thirty-day suspension following a drunk driving incident, an action which was upheld on appeal to the state Supreme Court.

== Later life and death ==
He was the state's longest sitting judge. According to Article VII of the Oregon Constitution, he would have had to retire at the end of 2014. He died in Salem, Oregon on February 10, 2014, from a brain hemorrhage after a fall; he was 74.
