= Gerry Frank =

American businessman (1923–2022)

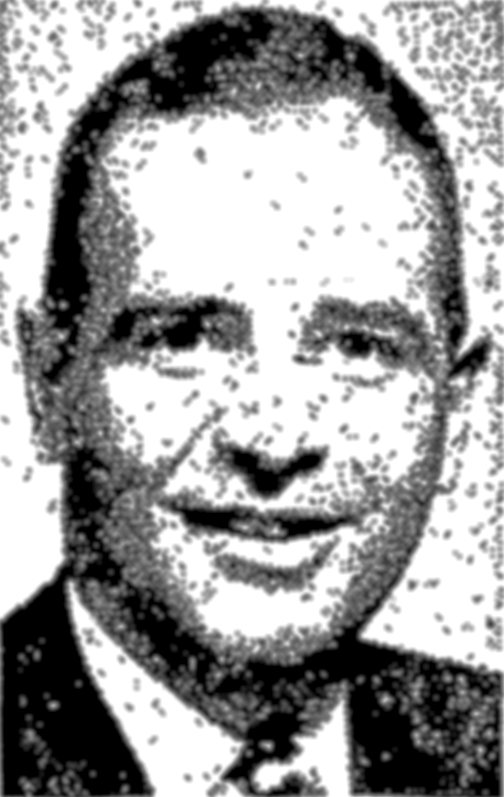
- Frank in or before 1963
- Born: Gerald Wendel Frank; September 21, 1923; Portland, Oregon, U.S.
- Died: March 13, 2022 (aged 98)
- Education: University of Cambridge
- Occupations: Business owner, chief of staff, writer

Gerald Wendel "Gerry" Frank (September 21, 1923 – March 13, 2022) was an Oregon businessman, philanthropist, police advocate, author, and longtime chief of staff to U.S. senator Mark Hatfield.

== Biography ==
Frank was a vice president of the Meier and Frank department store chain, which was founded by his great-grandfather Aaron Meier in 1857. He left that position in 1965, during a time of disagreement among the Meier and Frank families over potential buyout offers. His departure came shortly after the board had forced his father, Aaron Frank, out as chief executive; he later described it as the saddest period of his life.

He was already a millionaire when he went on to become an aide to Hatfield; he initially took a salary of only $1, prior to becoming Hatfield's chief of staff. He was known as "Oregon's third senator" due to his political influence.

Frank opened a cake shop in Salem in 1982, and wrote guidebooks and newspaper columns about food and travel.

Frank died March 13, 2022. About 400 people attended his memorial service at the Salem Convention Center. He left a significant collection of memorabilia to the Oregon Historical Society.
