= Fairmount Hotel (Portland, Oregon) =

Historic building in Portland, Oregon, U.S.

- U.S. National Register of Historic Places
- Portland Historic Landmark
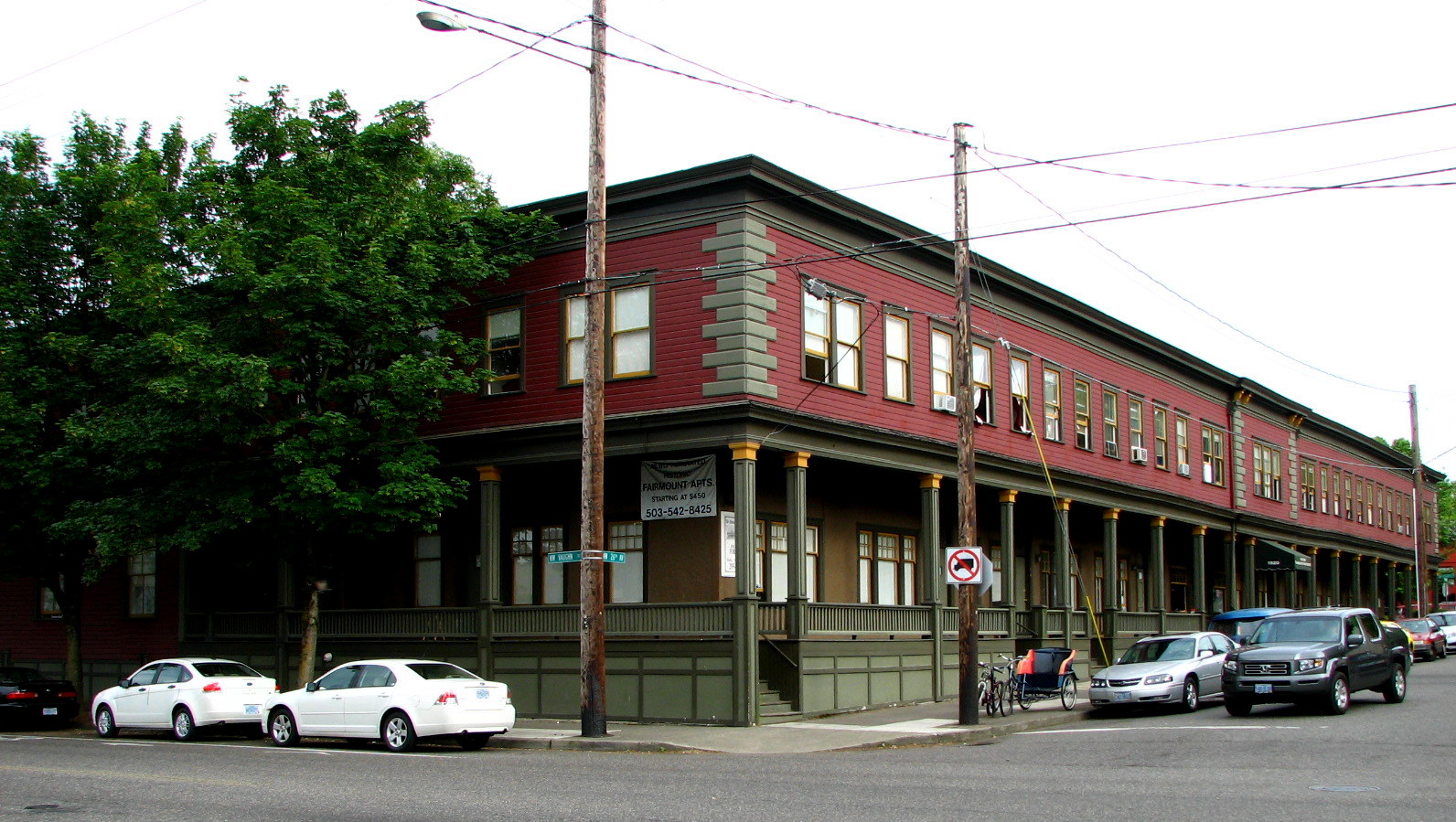
- The Hotel from the northwest, across the intersection of NW 26th Avenue and Vaughn Street

- Location within Portland, Oregon
- Location: 1920 NW 26th Avenue; Portland, Oregon
- Coordinates: 45°32′11″N 122°42′17″W
- Built: 1905
- NRHP reference No.: 00000448
- Added to NRHP: May 5, 2000

The Fairmount Hotel is a historic, former hotel located in Portland, Oregon, United States, built in 1905. It is listed on the National Register of Historic Places.

The hotel was constructed for the Lewis and Clark Centennial Exposition, located on 26th Avenue across from what was then the fair's main gate. The hotel was furnished by Meier & Frank. It is one of the very few extant structures associated with the 1905 world's fair.
