= James W. Mott =

American politician (1883–1945)

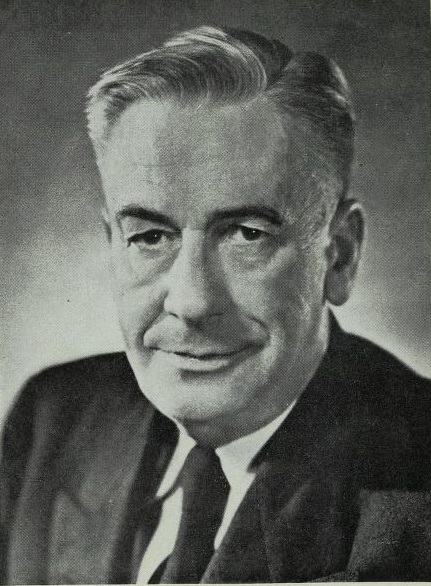

Member of the U.S. House of Representatives from Oregon's 1st district
- In office March 4, 1933 – November 12, 1945
- Preceded by: Willis C. Hawley
- Succeeded by: A. Walter Norblad

Member of the Oregon House of Representatives
- In office 1922–1928; 1930–1932

Personal details
- Born: James Wheaton Mott; November 12, 1883 Clearfield County, Pennsylvania
- Died: November 12, 1945 (aged 62) Bethesda, Maryland
- Party: Republican
- Spouse: Ethel Lucile Walling

James Wheaton Mott (November 12, 1883 – November 12, 1945) was a U.S. representative from Oregon. A graduate of Columbia University and Willamette University's law school, he worked as a newspaper reporter, city attorney, and was elected to the Oregon House of Representatives.

== Early life ==
Born in Clearfield County near New Washington, Pennsylvania, Mott moved with his parents to Salem, Oregon, in 1890. There he attended the public schools, and then the University of Oregon in Eugene, Stanford University in California, and finally Columbia University in New York City where he graduated in 1909. Mott then worked as a newspaper reporter in New York City, San Francisco, California, and Salem between 1909 and 1917. In Salem he graduated from Willamette University College of Law in 1917 with a law degree. He was admitted to the bar in the same year and commenced practice in Astoria, Oregon.

During World War I, Mott served as a seaman first class in the United States Navy. After the war he returned to Astoria, where he worked as the city attorney from 1920 to 1922. In 1919, he married Ethel Lucile Walling, and they had three daughters together.

== Politics ==
Mott was elected to and served as member of the Oregon House of Representatives from 1922 to 1928, and again from 1930 to 1932. Between stints in the House, he moved to Salem in 1929. While in the legislature, he worked as the Corporation Commissioner of Oregon from 1931 to 1932.

In 1932, Mott was elected as a Republican to the United States House of Representatives. He was re-elected to five more terms.

While in Congress, he worked towards federal improvements at Tongue Point Naval Base and other Columbia River projects. In his version of the Federal-Aid Highway Act of 1944, Mott is credited with the first use of the term interstate to refer to the system of express highways that became the federal Interstate Highway System.

In April and May 1945, Mott traveled to Germany with a number of other congressmen and senators to tour some of the newly liberated Nazi concentration camps, including Buchenwald on April 24 and Dachau on May 2. Mott helped to put together a special report for the U.S. Senate concerning the atrocities and conditions in the camps.

== Death ==
Mott remained in Congress until his death in Bethesda, Maryland, on November 12, 1945, his 62nd birthday. He was interred in Salem, Oregon's City View Cemetery.

== See also ==
- List of members of the United States Congress who died in office (1900–1949)

U.S. House of Representatives
Preceded by Willis C. Hawley	U.S. Representative of Oregon's 1st congressional district 1933–1945	Succeeded by A. Walter Norblad
