= George W. Joseph =

American politician (1872–1930)

George W.P. Joseph
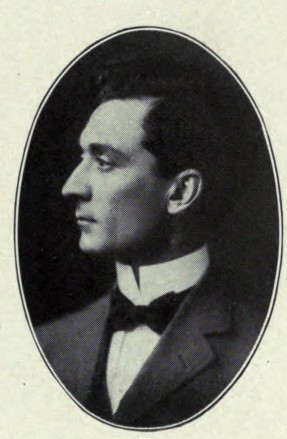

Member of the Oregon Senate from the 13th district
- In office 1921–1929
- In office 1911–1915

Personal details
- Born: George W. P. Joseph; May 10, 1872 Modoc County, California, U.S.
- Died: June 17, 1930 (aged 58) Clatsop County, Oregon, U.S.
- Party: Republican
- Spouse: Bertha Snell (m. 1903)
- Children: 1

George W. P. Joseph (May 10, 1872 – June 17, 1930) was an attorney and Republican politician in the U.S. state of Oregon. A native of California, his family relocated to Oregon when he was young. There he would practice law and serve in the Oregon State Senate.

== Early life ==
Joseph was born on May 10, 1872, in a log cabin on Joseph Creek in Modoc County, California. The son of Delilah Jane Joseph (née Heath) and Edwin Worthington Joseph, Joseph moved to Oregon in 1876 with his parents. In 1889, he graduated from high school in Lakeview, Oregon. He then studied law under the tutelage of two local judges, and worked as a retail clerk. Judge Townshend encouraged Joseph to move to Portland to pursue a career in law, and arranged for his employment there.

Joseph moved to Portland and began working for the law offices of Watson, Hume and Watson in 1892. He passed the bar exam in 1893. Joseph formed a close friendship with Julius Meier, who was also just completing his law studies, in 1892. The two formed a partnership in 1895, and Joseph was retained as an attorney by Meier & Frank and by several individual members of the Meier family.

Two years later, the Klondike Gold Rush hit, and Joseph traveled to Alaska with a Judge Adams to explore the opportunity. They staked a claim and established a mine. Joseph ultimately returned to Oregon poorer than when he had left, and resumed his partnership with Meier. During this period, Joseph found a respect for the political progressivism of Theodore Roosevelt.

Joseph married Bertha L. Snell in September 1903 in Drain, Oregon. They had a son, George W. Joseph Jr., born in 1905. George Jr. went on to chair the state hydroelectric commission, appointed by Gov. Meier, and also served as president of the Oregon mental health association.

After Meier left the partnership to join his family's department store, Meier & Frank, Joseph partnered with Bert E. Haney to form the legal practice Joseph, Haney, and Littlefield. Notably, he drew up and executed the will of his friend E. Henry Wemme, owner of the Mount Hood Company and, thereby, the Bull Run Hydroelectric Project and the historic Barlow Road.

Joseph was a noted opponent of an effort to call a state constitutional convention in 1905, which was generally popular among Portland attorneys.

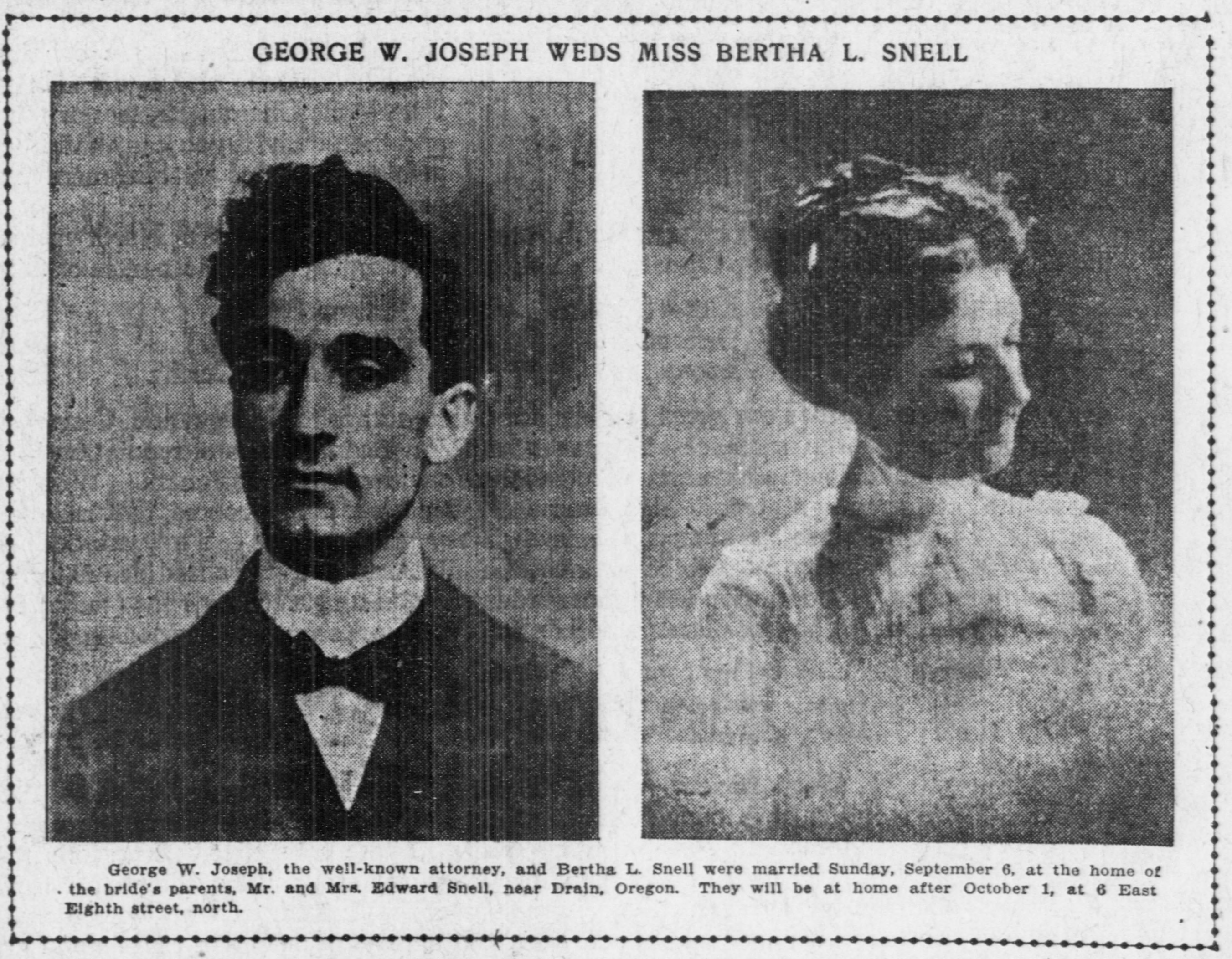
Joseph married Bertha Snell in September 1903.

== Political career ==
Joseph was elected to the Oregon State Senate in 1910 as a Republican representing Multnomah County. He served in the 1911 and 1913 legislative sessions. He introduced legislation supporting the 1912 amendment to the Oregon Constitution that established women's suffrage, and introduced Senate Bill 42 in 1911 that would have created a highway commission. He advocated for a large appropriation for Oregon's exhibit at the Panama–Pacific International Exposition in 1915. He argued it was a unique opportunity to display its various economic offerings to the world; he asserted that an investment of $500,000 would "come back many fold". Joseph did not seek re-election in the 1914 election.

In 1918, Joseph made a gift of the historic Barlow Road to a committee tasked with creating a commemorative highway between Portland and Mount Hood.

In 1920, Joseph was re-elected to the Senate. He was active in Portland's civic issues in addition to his duties at the state level; for instance, his plan for downtown Portland traffic and parking was described in a 1921 Oregonian story. He was elected to another four-year term in 1924, representing District 13. Joseph did not return for the 1929 legislative session.

During his time in the Oregon Senate, Joseph introduced numerous bills that would have promoted the development of hydroelectric power under public ownership. At the time, the state was home to less than 1% of the U.S. population, but was understood to possess 10 to 12% of the nation's potential hydroelectric capacity. Joseph's bills, however, were not taken seriously in the Senate.

In late 1925, Joseph considered a run for the United States Senate, and received strong assurances from Henry Hanzen, a political editor, that the Republican nomination was his for the asking. He ultimately declined to run for national office, however, stating to Hanzen:

...I shall never seek office which will take me away from the people of Oregon. I am going to stay in the fight for them.

(Had he won the nomination, he would have faced his former law partner, Democrat Bert Haney, in the general election.)

In the late 1920s, the matter of Wemme's estate went before the Oregon Supreme Court. Joseph accused the opposing attorney, Thomas Mannix, of collusion with Chief Justice John L. Rand. In the ensuing controversy, Mannix filed disbarment proceedings against Joseph. Joseph then announced his candidacy for Governor of Oregon in the 1930 election, seeking vindication from the people of Oregon.

Joseph was considered a populist candidate, and a prominent advocate for public development of hydroelectric dams on the Columbia River. He won the Republican nomination on May 16, defeating incumbent A. W. Norblad by over 5000 votes. In those days, the Republican nomination virtually guaranteed victory in the general election.

About two weeks after the primary election, Joseph and Mannix were both permanently disbarred by the Oregon Supreme Court. Before the general election, however, Joseph died of a stroke, on June 17, during an army drill near the Oregon National Guard's Camp Clatsop (later renamed Camp Rilea).

== Legacy ==
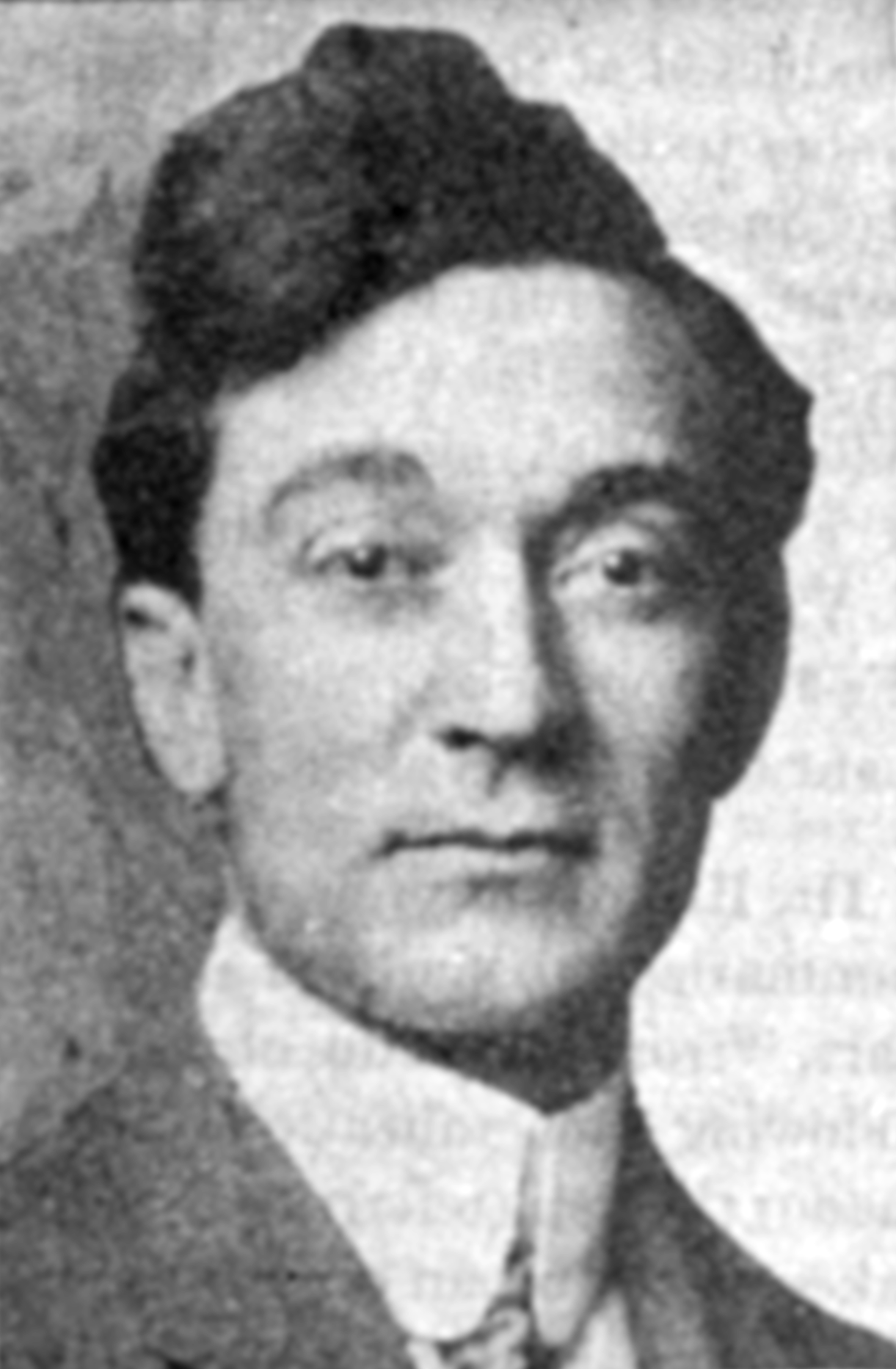

The Republican Party nominated Phil Metschan to take Joseph's place on the ballot. Metschan, who had not run in the primary, opposed public power utilities, a significant departure from Joseph's platform.

Joseph's friend and former law partner Julius Meier entered the race as an independent candidate, adopting Joseph's platform. Meier won the three-candidate election with 54.5% of the vote. He went on to pass legislation in accordance with Joseph's platform, highlighting those efforts in his 1935 address. Meier later unveiled a monument to Joseph at Camp Clatsop.

Joseph's heirs donated a piece of property to the State of Oregon in 1934, which is now known as George W. Joseph State Natural Area. Joseph's cousin, George M. Joseph, was a prominent Oregon attorney and judge.

Party political offices
Preceded by I. L. Patterson	Republican nominee for Governor of Oregon; Deceased; 1930	Succeeded by Phil Metschan Jr.
