= Henry L. Hess =

American politician

Henry Leroy Hess
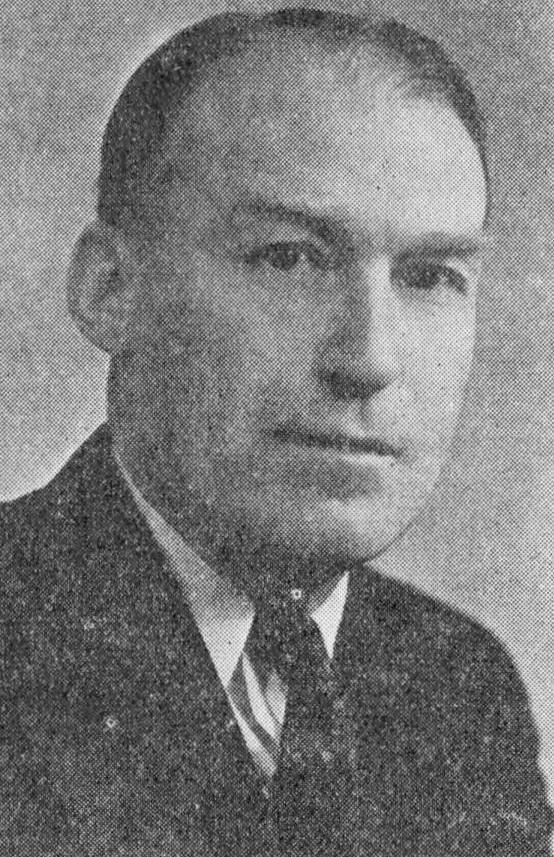

United States Attorney for the District of Oregon
- In office 1945–1954
- Preceded by: Carl C. Donaugh

Member of the Oregon Senate from the 21st district
- In office January 9, 1933 – January 11, 1937
- Preceded by: Colon R. Eberhard
- Succeeded by: Clyde L. Kiddle

Personal details
- Born: October 12, 1890 Rexburg, Idaho, United States
- Died: March 15, 1974 (aged 83) Washington County, Oregon, United States
- Party: Democratic
- Spouse: Madeline Owsley (m. 1964–74)
- Children: 1

Henry Leroy Hess (October 12, 1890 – March 15, 1974) was an American lawyer and politician from Oregon.

== Biography ==
Hess was born in 1890 in Rexburg, Idaho.

A Democrat, Hess served a term in the Oregon State Senate from 1933 until 1937, representing Union and Wallowa counties. In 1938, he ran for Governor of Oregon. In the Democratic primary, he ran against incumbent Governor Charles Martin, as well as state representative O. Henry Oleen. Harold L. Ickes, Roosevelt's Secretary of the Interior and a key implementer of New Deal policies, indicated his support for Hess, though Roosevelt himself stayed officially neutral. He defeated Martin and Oleen with 49% of the vote. In the general election, Hess lost to Republican candidate Charles A. Sprague with 43% of the vote.

Following his defeat, Hess served as U.S. Attorney for the United States District Court for the District of Oregon from 1945 until 1954. He was also a delegate to the 1944 Democratic National Convention.

Hess married Madeline Mae Owsley (1911–2003) on March 30, 1964, in Stevenson, Washington. He had a son, Henry L. Hess Jr., from a different relationship.

Hess died on March 15, 1974, in Washington County, Oregon.

Party political offices
Preceded by Charles Martin	Democratic nominee for Governor of Oregon; 1938	Succeeded by Lew Wallace
