= George W. Joseph State Natural Area =

State natural area in Oregon, United States

- Location within Oregon Location within the United States
- Type: Public, state
- Location: Multnomah County, Oregon
- Nearest city: Troutdale
- Coordinates: 45°31′48″N 122°13′16″W
- Operator: Oregon Parks and Recreation Department

George W. Joseph State Natural Area is a natural area in the U.S. state of Oregon. It is located near the city of Troutdale between Latourell Falls and Guy W. Talbot State Park, and is accessible from both.

The land was donated by the estate of George W. Joseph, a state senator and an influential nominee for Governor of Oregon in 1930.

== See also ==
- List of Oregon state parks
