= Wendell Wyatt =

American politician (1917–2009)

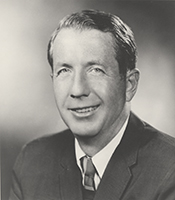

Member of the U.S. House of Representatives from Oregon's 1st district
- In office November 3, 1964 – January 3, 1975
- Preceded by: A. Walter Norblad
- Succeeded by: Les AuCoin

Personal details
- Born: June 15, 1917 Eugene, Oregon, U.S.
- Died: January 28, 2009 (aged 91) Portland, Oregon, U.S.
- Party: Republican
- Spouse(s): (1) Anne Buchanan (divorced) (2) Faye Hill

Wendell Wyatt (June 15, 1917 – January 28, 2009) was an American attorney and Republican United States Representative from Oregon's 1st congressional district who served in the United States House of Representatives from 1964 until 1975.

== Life before Congress ==
Born in Eugene, Oregon, Wyatt's family later moved to Portland where he graduated from Jefferson High School in 1935. He received his Bachelor of Laws degree from the University of Oregon in 1941. In World War II, he served in the United States Marine Corps from 1942 until 1946.

Following the war, Wyatt moved to Astoria, where he joined the law firm of former Oregon governor A. W. Norblad. He was Chairman of the Oregon State Republican Central committee from 1955 until 1957. In 1962, Wyatt married Faye Hill; he had previously married and divorced Anne Buchanan.

== U.S. Congress ==
In 1964, he won a special election to fill the vacancy caused by the death of A. Walter Norblad, the son of Wyatt's law partner. Wyatt was reelected to the four succeeding Congresses. In Congress, Wyatt served on the Interior Committee and the Appropriations Committee, where he helped pass bills that created Oregon's Scoggins Dam on Scoggins Creek, established a 40-foot shipping channel in the Columbia River from Astoria to Portland, created the Cascade Head Scenic Area, and purchased ranch land to be converted to public recreation areas along the Snake River. Wyatt voted in favor of the Voting Rights Act of 1965 and the Civil Rights Act of 1968.

== Conviction ==
Following his retirement from Congress, Wyatt was found guilty and fined $750 on one count of failing to report outlays from a secret cash fund he controlled while heading the Richard Nixon campaign in Oregon.

== Afterwards ==
He became a partner at the law firm of Schwabe, Williamson & Wyatt.

The Edith Green - Wendell Wyatt Federal Building in downtown Portland is named in honor of Wyatt and Congresswoman Edith Green, alongside whom he served during all but three days of his tenure in Congress.

Wyatt died in Portland in 2009 at the age of 91.

U.S. House of Representatives
Preceded by A. Walter Norblad	Member of the U.S. House of Representatives from Oregon's 1st congressional district 1964–1975	Succeeded by Les AuCoin
