= E. Henry Wemme =

- Born: Ernest Heinrich Wemme; 1861; Crostau, Kingdom of Saxony
- Died: 1914 (aged 52–53); Los Angeles, California, U.S.
- Resting place: River View Cemetery

Ernest Heinrich Wemme (1861–1914) was a German businessman and philanthropist who came to prominence in Portland, in the U.S. state of Oregon. He was an active business investor during the pioneering era of automobiles and aviation.

== Biography ==
A farmer's son born in the village of Crostau, Kingdom of Saxony, as Ernest Heinrich Wemme, he had only a grade-school education. Facing enrollment in the German army, he immigrated to the United States at 18 years of age, not intending to stay. He later said he "went broke and couldn't get away."

According to an account published in 1932 by August Wemme, his brother, Henry Wemme began his career in Portland in 1883, "with a spool of thread and a needle or two as capital."

One of his ventures was as a supplier of tents and other supplies to those joining the Klondike Gold Rush. Wemme purchased canvas and cotton, having more material "than all the rest of the dealers on the coast put together", just as the boom to Alaska came to an end. However, the large payments for excess materials occurred just as the USS Maine was sunk, starting the Spanish–American War. Wemme was given an order for 32,000 tents, plus "an open order for hospital tents, telling me to make all I could." Instead of going bankrupt, Wemme used up his large surplus of materials and made a substantial profit.

Wemme owned the first automobile in Oregon, a Stanley Steamer bought in 1899 from what became the Locomobile Company of America. He also introduced other automobiles to the Portland area, including a Haynes-Apperson, an Oldsmobile, a Reo, and a Pierce-Arrow. He was president of the Portland Automobile Association. Each of his successive cars bore the Oregon license plate #1.

In 1906 he sold Willamette Tent & Awning to Max S. Hirsch (who had worked for his relatives at the Meier & Frank department store for the previous 20 years and sold his M&F stock for $50,000 in order to finance the purchase of Wemme's business. The firm became known as Hirsch-Weis and then White Stag). Wemme invested most of his wealth in downtown Portland real estate. In 1910, he was a noted advocate for building the Columbia River Highway.

In 1912, Wemme bought the Barlow Toll Road for $5,400. He built bridges and made other improvements worth $25,000, then gave it to the people of Oregon as a free highway. Wemme, Oregon, is an unincorporated area along the Mount Hood Corridor and is named after him.

He at least briefly turned his attention to aviation, becoming the Pacific Northwest agent for the biplanes by Curtiss. One of his automobile salesmen, Eugene Ely volunteered to fly Wemme's first Curtiss biplane to Oregon. Ely crashed without serious injury, and soon went to work for Curtiss.

He developed the Overlook neighborhood in North Portland.

"As for his personality, Wemme usually dressed like a poverty-stricken laborer. He seldome wore pressed clothes or had his shoes shined and he was generally unshaven. He was always mouthing an unlighted cigar, the liquid qualities of which ran down both sides of his mouth and chin. He worked like a horse and lived like a hermit." He never married.

Wemme died December 17, 1914, in Short Hills, a suburb of Los Angeles; he is buried in Riverview Cemetery in Portland, Oregon. Wemme's brother's book bemoans a probate dispute over "an estate appraised at more than a million dollars…"; the book was written to

get before the American people…the facts as how E. Henry Wemme's will was set aside, rendered null and void, and how both heirs of his body and the E. Henry Wemme Endowment Fund (now administered by the Oregon Community Foundation) was pillaged and plundered and dissipated, and to show how and why I have been cast into prison, where I still languish at the age of sixty three…

August Wemme later lived in a "skid row hotel" in Portland, and in an apparent bout of senility, left a suitcase filled with gold from his inheritance on a train in Chicago.

Wemme's will, drawn and executed by Portland lawyer and friend, George W. Joseph, bequeathed half to the Christian Science Church and half to German heirs. The dispute evolved into a major political fracas, going as far as the Oregon Supreme Court; in the process, Joseph was disbarred, and also launched a strong run for Governor of Oregon, though he died shortly after earning the Republican Party's nomination. The case ultimately went to the United States Supreme Court before the estate was divided among several heirs in the U.S. and Germany.

Ultimately, half of his estate went to "found and maintain a large home for wayward girls". It is now known as the Salvation Army White Shield Home in Northwest Portland, located at 45.541747°N 122.723165°W. It serves pregnant teens and young mothers who are in the foster system, typically due to being from a violent or abusive family.

== See also ==
- Bull Run Hydroelectric Project – a hydroelectric project of the Mount Hood Company, which Wemme owned for part of the time

== Sources ==
- Books by E. Kimbark MacColl such as Merchants, Money and Power: The Portland Establishment, 1843–1913 (Portland, Oregon: Georgian Press Company, 1988), ISBN 0-9603408-3-1
- "A Chronological History of ODOT" – Oregon Department of Transportation
