= Charles Martin (Oregon politician) =

21st Governor of Oregon

Charles H. Martin
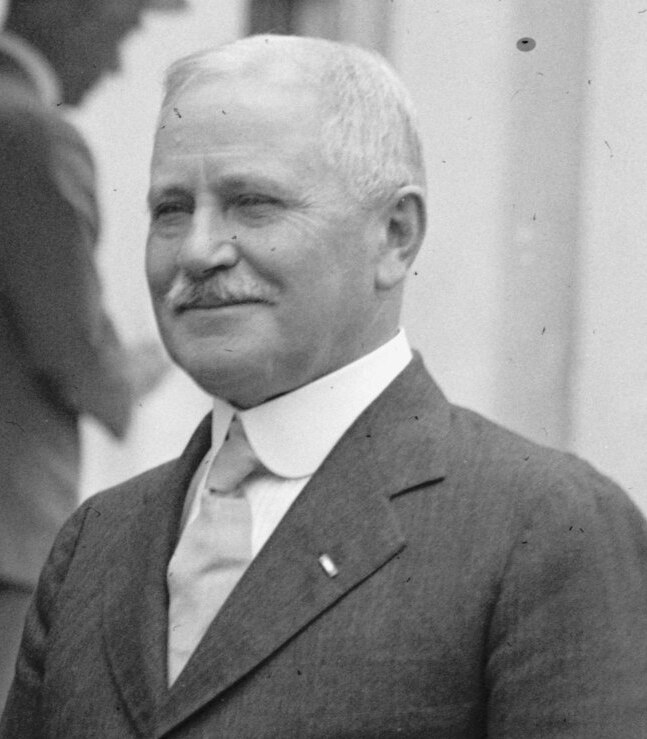
- Martin in 1923

21st Governor of Oregon
- In office January 14, 1935 – January 9, 1939
- Preceded by: Julius L. Meier
- Succeeded by: Charles A. Sprague

Member of the U.S. House of Representatives from Oregon's 3rd district
- In office March 4, 1931 – January 3, 1935
- Preceded by: Franklin F. Korell
- Succeeded by: William A. Ekwall

Personal details
- Born: Charles Henry Martin; October 1, 1863 Edwards County, Illinois, U.S.
- Died: September 22, 1946 (aged 82) Portland, Oregon, U.S.
- Resting place: River View Cemetery
- Party: Democratic
- Spouse: Louise Hughes
- Profession: Military, politician
- Military career
- Allegiance: United States
- Branch: United States Army
- Service years: 1887–1927
- Rank: Major General
- Service number: 0-191
- Unit: Infantry Branch
- Commands: Panama Canal Department; Panama Canal Division; 16th Infantry Brigade; VII Corps; VI Corps; 90th Infantry Division; 92d Division; 86th Division; 172nd Infantry Brigade; 55th Infantry Regiment
- Conflicts: Spanish–American War; Philippine–American War; Boxer Rebellion; World War I
- Awards: Army Distinguished Service Medal

Charles Henry Martin (October 1, 1863 – September 22, 1946) was an American Army officer and later politician in the state of Oregon. A native of Illinois, he had a 40-year career in the military including serving in conflicts from the Spanish–American War to World War I before retiring as a major general. A Democrat, he was the U.S. representative for Oregon's 3rd congressional district from 1931 to 1935 and then was the state's 21st governor from 1935 to 1939. From 1923 to 1924 he was vice president, from 1924 to 1925 president of the Aztec Club of 1847.

== Biography ==
=== Early life ===
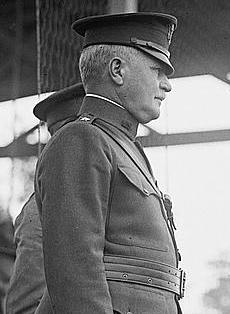
Martin in 1922

Charles Martin was born near Albion, Illinois, on October 1, 1863. He attended Ewing College (Ewing, Illinois) for two years until he was appointed to the U.S. Military Academy. He would actively serve in the Spanish–American War, Philippine–American War, and Boxer Rebellion after graduating from West Point in 1887, 19th in a class of 64. Among his classmates included several men who would later rise to the rank of brigadier general or higher in their military careers. They included: Charles B. Wheeler, Edward C. Young, Richmond P. Davis, Edgar Russel, George O. Squier, Ernest Hinds, George W. Gatchell, P. D. Lochridge, Nathaniel F. McClure, William C. Rivers, William Weigel, Thomas G. Hanson, Herman Hall, Marcus D. Cronin, Alexander L. Dade, Charles S. Farnsworth, Charles Gerhardt, James T. Dean, Ulysses G. McAlexander, Edmund Wittenmyer, Frederic D. Evans, Michael J. Lenihan, Mark L. Hersey and Frank H. Albright.

In 1920, when the army's authority to maintain Jim Crow regulations seemed threatened, Martin wrote that "the negro is of very little importance... the average negro is not by any means equal to the average white man."

Martin was later a division commander of the famous Blackhawk Division during World War I and served as the U.S. Army Assistant Chief of Staff from 1922 to 1924. He was honored with the Distinguished Service Medal and two citations for bravery in action and retired from the Army as a major general on October 1, 1927, after commanding the Panama Canal Department for three years. His DSM citation reads:

The President of the United States of America, authorized by Act of Congress, July 9, 1918, takes pleasure in presenting the Army Distinguished Service Medal to Major General Charles Henry Martin, United States Army, for exceptionally meritorious and distinguished services to the Government of the United States, in a duty of great responsibility during World War I. As Commander of the 90th Division during the greater part of its service with the Army of Occupation, by his ceaseless energy he performed his duties with the utmost efficiency, giving the closest personal supervision to the training, discipline, and equipment of his Division. His brilliant professional attainments and steadfast devotion to duty were reflected in the high standards maintained throughout the organizations under his command, rendering important services to the American Expeditionary Forces.

=== Congressman and Governor ===
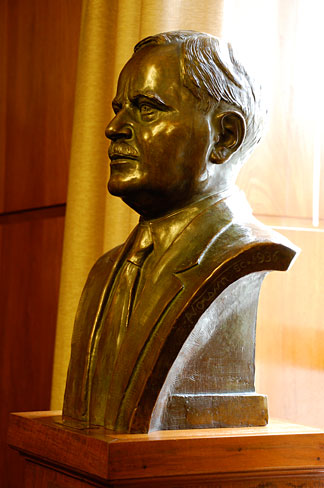
Bust of Martin in the Governor's Office in the Oregon State Capitol in Salem

Martin embarked on his second career after retiring to Portland, Oregon with his wife. From March 4, 1931, to January 3, 1935, he served as a conservative Democratic Representative to the U.S. Congress from Oregon's Third Congressional District.

Martin was elected governor in 1934, during a time of intense labor turmoil and the middle of the Great Depression, earning a reputation for restoring state finances. The major issues that Martin dealt with during his time in office were economic recovery from the Great Depression, reconstruction of the Oregon State Capitol, the planning and construction of the Bonneville Dam, and the development of statewide port and highway infrastructures. When the Depression eased, he opposed the full restoration of wage levels for state employees, who had suffered a 50 percent pay cut.

Martin became known as a pro-business governor in early May 1935 when timber workers began to strike, declaring, "These pestiferous peewees would go to any lengths to embarrass me and my administration." In private correspondence and public appearances he railed against the National Labor Relations Board, declared union organizers to be gangsters and Bolsheviks, and considered Secretary of Labor Frances Perkins to be the head "red" in the Roosevelt administration. Martin threatened to fire Columbia County Sheriff Oscar Weed for not responding harshly enough to striking workers, instructing the state's sheriffs to "beat hell out of 'em!" and "crack their damn heads! Those fellows are there for nothing but trouble – give it to them!" On May 23, 1935, Martin ordered the state police and National Guard to protect strikebreakers at the Stimson Mill strike in the Washington County town of Gaston. The National Guard was again called out to harass, intimidate, and arrest striking longshoremen in 1937.

Martin grew in his vocal opposition to Roosevelt's New Deal, especially to the National Labor Relations Board (NLRB) and the President's labor policy. In 1937, the NLRB failed to settle a jurisdictional dispute between the Congress of Industrial Organizations (CIO) and the American Federation of Labor (AFL) that had closed all Portland sawmills. Martin stepped in and held his own elections, which led to the reopening of the mills. He made himself the enemy of what many saw as corrupt labor leaders, particularly by his appointment of Assistant Attorney General Ralph E. Moody to prosecute many union people accused of arson and assault.

In 1939, Martin welcomed Harry H. Laughlin's proposal to chloroform the feeble-minded, stating, "The theory is a fine thing in principle. Civilization must find some way to best deal with this distressing situation. It is one of the problems for the young people of today." In 1936, he suggested that the state could save $300,000 in the next two years by putting 900 of the 969 developmentally-disabled patients at the Fairview Training Center in Salem "out of their misery." Martin also believed that military action was necessary against Jewish communists and Irish people.

Martin showed sympathy for fascism. Asked about the possibility of a communist takeover, he dismissed the threat, referencing Nazi Germany and Fascist Italy.

"There are enough strong men left in the country to handle it properly. The Italians organized their black shirts. The Germans had their brown shirts and Hitler. I don't believe Americans will submit."

He was often quoted for his rephrasing of President Roosevelt's famous pronouncement on fear, saying, "We have nothing to fear from the future except our own foolishness and slothfulness." His criticism of President Roosevelt, however, cost Martin a bitterly contested bid for the Democratic Party of Oregon's gubernatorial nomination in 1938.

=== Death and legacy ===
After losing the nomination, Martin retired from active politics to his Portland home. He died on September 22, 1946, and was interred at River View Cemetery in Portland.

== Footnotes ==
U.S. House of Representatives
Preceded by Franklin F. Korell	U.S. Representative of Oregon's 3rd congressional district 1931–1935	Succeeded by William A. Ekwall
Political offices
Preceded by Julius L. Meier	Governor of Oregon; 1935–1939	Succeeded by Charles A. Sprague
Party political offices
Preceded by Edward F. Bailey	Democratic nominee for Governor of Oregon; 1934	Succeeded by Henry L. Hess
