= Julius Meier =

20th Governor of Oregon

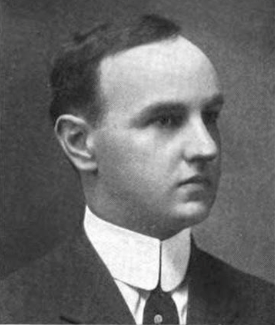
- Meier in 1911

20th Governor of Oregon
- In office January 12, 1931 – January 14, 1935
- Preceded by: A. W. Norblad
- Succeeded by: Charles Martin

Personal details
- Born: December 31, 1874 Portland, Oregon, U.S.
- Died: July 14, 1937 (aged 62) Corbett, Oregon, U.S.
- Party: Republican (before 1930); Independent (1930–1937)
- Spouse: Grace Mayer (m. 1901)
- Children: 3
- Education: University of Oregon (LLB)

Julius L. Meier (December 31, 1874 – July 14, 1937) was an American businessman, civic leader, and politician in the state of Oregon. The son of the Meier & Frank department store founder, he would become a lawyer before entering the family business in Portland. Politically an independent, Meier served a single term as the 20th governor of Oregon from 1931 to 1935. He is the only independent to be elected Governor of Oregon, as well as the state’s first Jewish governor.

== Early life ==
Meier was born in Portland to German immigrants of Jewish ancestry: Aaron, a merchant and founder of Oregon's largest department store, Meier & Frank, and Jeannette (Hirsch) Meier. He had three siblings. He married Grace Mayer on Christmas Day, 1901, saying afterwards that it was the only day that he was allowed off from the store. They had three children: Jean Ellen Meier Ehrman Reichert, Elsa Frances Meier Ganz, and Julius L. (Jack) Meier, Jr.

Meier graduated from the University of Oregon School of Law in 1895 and practiced law with a partner, George W. Joseph for the next four years, until he went into the family's business. According to family tradition, it was at this time that he added the "L" to his name; the sign painter, who was putting his name on the door, insisted that all lawyers of substance had a middle name, so Meier suggested an "L".

== Political career ==
Meier devoted 30 years to civic involvement before entering elective politics. A noted philanthropist, he also kept a high profile leading many good causes. During World War I, he headed Liberty Loan drives, served as regional director of the Council of National Defense, and after the war aided in the rehabilitation of France. He also headed the Oregon Commission of the 1915 Panama–Pacific International Exposition in San Francisco, and in 1922 attempted to bring a world's fair to Portland in 1925.

An important accomplishment was his leading the Columbia River Highway Association, the citizen committee creating political support for building the Columbia River Highway, first west from Portland to Astoria (1912–1915) and later east from Portland to The Dalles (1913–1922). His daughter, Jean, would later recall that he walked or crawled every inch of the highway's projected roadway.

In the 1920s, as an attorney and highly involved in Portland's Republican Party, Meier took over Henry L. Corbett's work between the party and the city government, meaning he received monthly payments from organized crime, especially Prohibition-era liquor and gambling operations. The full monthly payment was $175,000; Meier received his portion as cash from florist Tommy Luke, a close friend of Mayor George Luis Baker.

In the 1930 gubernatorial election, George W. Joseph—who had been disbarred during an extensive dispute with the Oregon Supreme Court over the will and estate of E. Henry Wemme—won the Republican nomination for Governor of Oregon, but died shortly after. When Meier declined the nomination, the Republican Party selected Phil Metschan, Jr., son of a former Oregon state treasurer and affiliated with the KKK, as a replacement nominee. In contrast to a core element of Joseph's platform, Metschan opposed public development of hydroelectric power along the Columbia River.

Meier entered the race as an independent candidate, adopting Joseph's platform. In spite of opposition to his candidacy by The Oregonian (the state's largest newspaper), he won 54.5% of the total vote, outdistancing his nearest competitor, Democratic candidate Edward F. Bailey, 135,608 votes to 62,434. Meier's overwhelming victory was viewed as a reflection of strong public support for public hydropower development.

Meier's graft continued as governor, as he "diligently went after corruption and graft everywhere his political enemies were practicing it". For instance, his Republican gubernatorial competitor, Phil Metschan, Jr., was on the Port of Portland board. Meier sent an aggressive forensic accountant, Frank Akin, to determine what fraud was occurring there. Akin clearly discovered problems but was murdered the day before he was slated to present it to the Oregon state legislature, and had also begun an investigation of the Portland Water Bureau. The evidence against the Port's James H. Polhemus was already public and his resignation was demanded. Many rumors swirled around Akin's death. Polhemus was eventually cleared of charges of graft.

Meier served for one term (1931–1935), declining to run for a second term for reasons of health. He hired George W. Joseph Jr. as a legal adviser during the first legislative session of his administration, paying the younger Joseph's salary personally. Among his accomplishments were establishing the Oregon Liquor Control Commission (after Prohibition ended), founding the Oregon State Police, helping create a State Board of Agriculture and State Unemployment Commission, pressing for the adoption of a non-partisan judicial system, and using his business acumen to help the state navigate the financial tribulations of the Great Depression. Efforts to establish a sales tax and public power were not immediately successful, though Federal legislation was passed in 1933 authorizing the public development of the Bonneville and Grand Coulee dams. During his tenure, Meier also advocated the provision of old age pensions.

== Later years ==
Time magazine reported in 1937 that Meier had sunk most of his fortune into what it called his "pet financial hobby", the American National Bank of Portland, which was closed in June 1933 and its assets and liabilities acquired by First National Bank. After serving as governor he retired to "Menucha", his estate above the Columbia River in Corbett, Oregon, designed by architect Herman Brookman, where he died in 1937. He is buried at Beth Israel Cemetery in Portland.

His family sold Menucha in 1950 to the First Presbyterian Church of Portland, which now operates it as a conference and retreat center. The Meier and Frank families sold the department store chain to the May Company in 1966. With May's sale to Federated in 2005, the remaining stores were rebranded as "Macy's" stores in September 2006.

== See also ==
- Independent (politician)#Governor

Political offices
Preceded by A. W. Norblad	Governor of Oregon; 1931–1935	Succeeded by Charles Martin
