= A. Walter Norblad =

American politician (1908–1964)

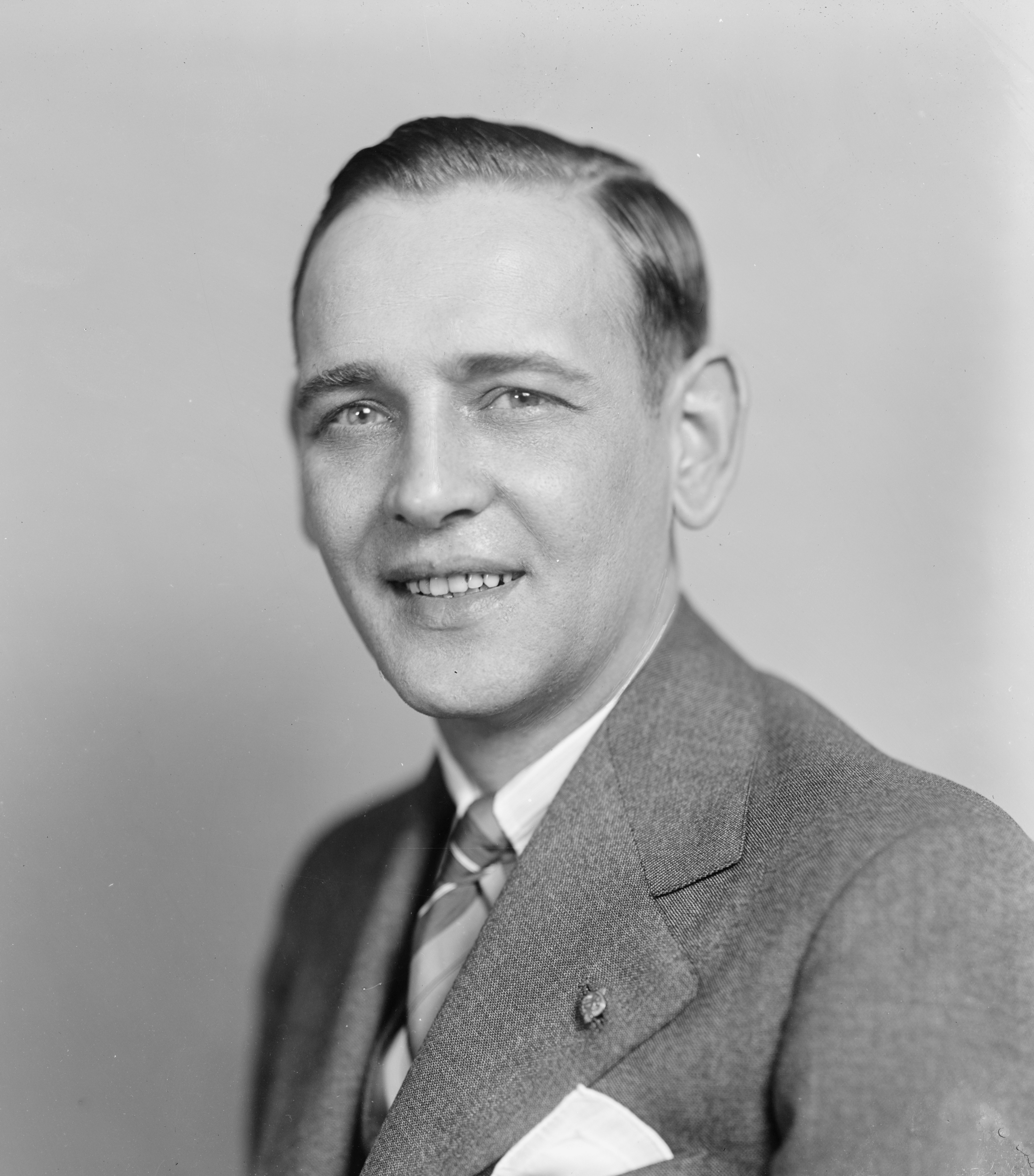
- Norblad as Congressman

Member of the U.S. House of Representatives from Oregon's 1st district
- In office January 18, 1946 – September 20, 1964
- Preceded by: James W. Mott
- Succeeded by: Wendell Wyatt

Member of the Oregon House of Representatives from the 1st, Astoria district
- In office 1935–1937
- Preceded by: Edwin C. Judd
- Succeeded by: Clarence Ash

Personal details
- Born: Albin Walter Norblad Jr. September 12, 1908 Escanaba, Michigan, U.S.
- Died: September 20, 1964 (aged 56) Bethesda, Maryland, U.S.
- Resting place: Lone Oak Cemetery in Stayton, Oregon
- Party: Republican
- Children: Albin W. Norblad
- Occupation: Attorney

Albin Walter Norblad Jr. (September 12, 1908 – September 20, 1964), was an American attorney and Republican politician in Oregon. He represented the U.S. state of Oregon's first district from January 18, 1946, until his death from a heart attack in Bethesda, Maryland, on September 20, 1964, in the United States House of Representatives. He was the son of Edna Lyle and A. W. Norblad Sr., a one-time governor of Oregon.

== Early years ==
Albin Walter Norblad Jr. was born in Escanaba, Michigan, but, before he was a year old, his family relocated to Astoria, Oregon, where he attended public schools, before completing his secondary studies at the New Mexico Military Academy at Roswell, New Mexico. A graduate of the University of Oregon, Norblad undertook graduate study at Harvard Law School, and was admitted to the bar in 1932, returning to his hometown of Astoria to practice at his father's firm of Norblad & Norblad.

== Career ==
Norblad served in the Oregon Legislative Assembly as a representative for one term (1935–1937), was a member of the board of trustees of Linfield College, and a delegate to the 1940 Republican National Convention.

=== World War II ===
During World War II, he joined the U.S. Army Air Forces, serving as a combat intelligence officer from 1942 to 1945.

=== Congress ===
Upon return from the war, he settled in Stayton, Oregon, and was elected to fill the vacancy in the United States Congress caused by the death of James W. Mott. He was re-elected to nine successive terms in the House of Representatives.

Norblad voted in favor of the Civil Rights Acts of 1957, 1960, and 1964, as well as the 24th Amendment to the U.S. Constitution.

== Death and family ==
Norblad died of a heart attack in office in Bethesda, Maryland, on September 20, 1964, and was buried in Lone Oak Cemetery in Stayton, Oregon.

One of Norblad's children, Albin W. Norblad III, was a state court judge in Oregon.

== See also ==
- List of members of the United States Congress who died in office (1950–1999)

U.S. House of Representatives
Preceded by James W. Mott	Member of the U.S. House of Representatives from Oregon's 1st congressional district 1946–1964	Succeeded by Wendell Wyatt
