= Meier & Frank =

American department store chain

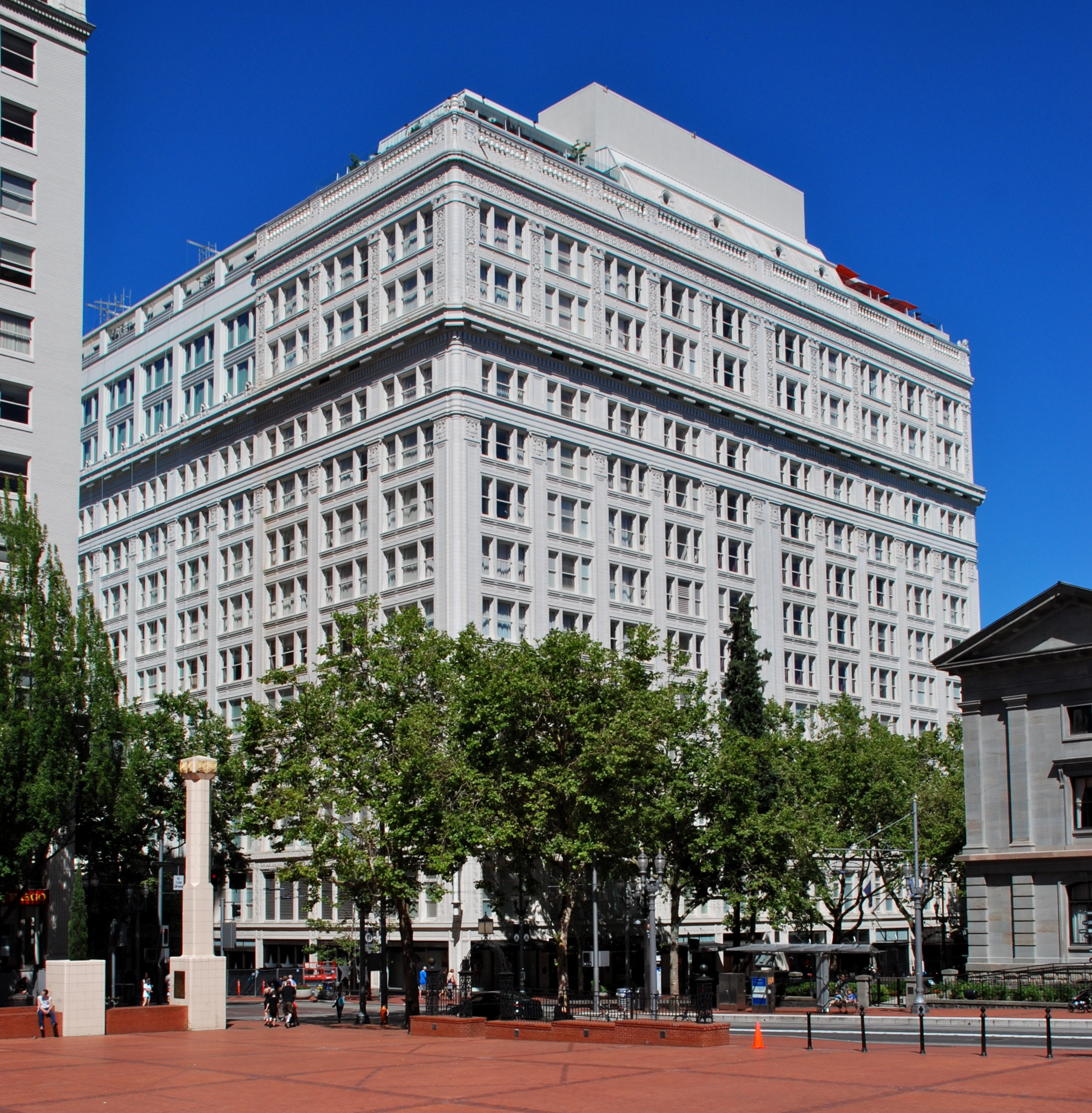
- Exterior of the former Meier & Frank Building flagship store in downtown Portland (2014)
- Type: Subsidiary
- Industry: Retail
- Genre: Department stores
- Founded: 1857; 169 years ago in Portland, Oregon, United States
- Founder: Aaron Meier
- Defunct: September 9, 2006; 20 years ago
- Fate: Acquisition by Federated Department Stores
- Successor: Macy's
- Headquarters: Meier & Frank Building, Portland, Oregon, United States
- Areas served: Oregon; Utah
- Products: Clothing; footwear; bedding; furniture; jewelry; beauty products; housewares
- Parent: The May Department Stores Company (1966–2005); Federated Department Stores (2005–2006)
- Website: Archived official website at the Wayback Machine (archive index)

Meier & Frank was an American department store chain founded in 1857 by Aaron Meier. He partnered with Emil and Sigmund Frank in the early history of the company, and opened the Meier & Frank Building flagship store in Portland, Oregon in 1909. It expanded throughout Oregon in the second half of the 20th century, facilitated by its acquisition by The May Department Stores Company in 1966, and entered Utah with the rebranding of ZCMI in 2001. May was acquired by Federated Department Stores in 2005, which dissolved Meier & Frank with its conversion to Macy's in 2006.

== 19th-century history ==
=== Establishment ===
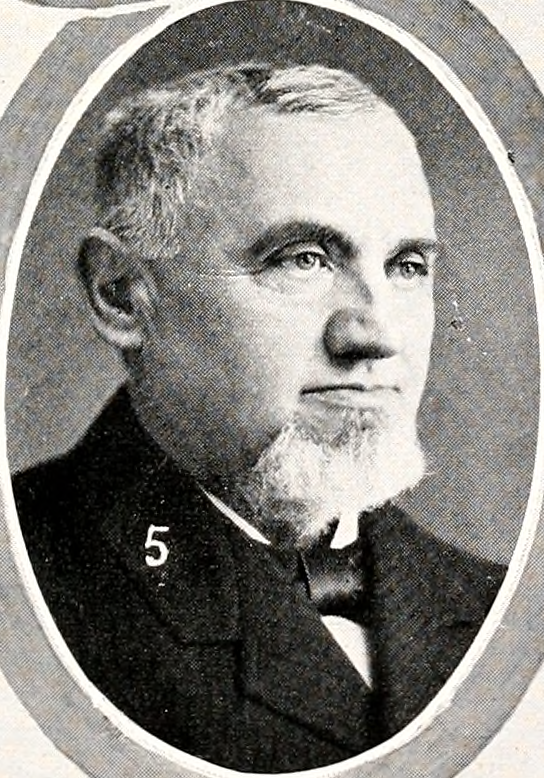
Aaron Meier

In 1857, Aaron Meier (1831–1889) arrived in the Oregon Territory at the age of 26 and opened a 35-by-50-foot (11 m × 15 m) mercantile store at 137 Front Street in Portland, which had a population of 1,300. He had come to California from Bavaria during the Gold Rush, spending time as an itinerant peddler in Southern Oregon. He formed a partnership with a Mr. Mariholtz and began selling merchandise that arrived by steamer from San Francisco and in the covered wagons rolling along the Oregon Trail. Ten years later, Meier returned to Ellerstadt (in today's Rhineland-Palatinate) after his father died, leaving Mariholtz to run the business. During his extended stay in Ellerstadt, Meier married a local woman, Jeanette Hirsch (1843–1925), and returned with her to Portland. Meanwhile, back in Portland the dry goods store had collapsed financially, bringing the partnership to an end. Aaron Meier started a new store with his $14,000 inheritance, in larger quarters of 25 by 100 feet (7.6 m × 30.5 m), at 136 Front Street. He hired Emil Frank (1845–1898) in 1870 and Emil's younger brother Sigmund Frank (1850–1910) in 1872. A year later, Emil Frank became Meier's partner, and the store became known as "Meier & Frank".

In 1878, the great Portland fire destroyed 20 downtown blocks, including the store, which was immediately rebuilt. Sigmund Frank became a partner in the store in 1884, and a year later married Aaron's only daughter, Fannie Meier (1865–1930). In 1885, Meier & Frank built its own two-story masonry building, 100 by 200 feet (30 m × 61 m), on Taylor Street between 1st and 2nd. Two years later the store held the first "Friday Surprise" sale on April 29.

=== Death of Meier ===
In 1888, Emil Frank left the partnership after years of simmering management differences, and Sigmund Frank became Meier's sole partner just before Meier died in 1889. The name of the store thus remained "Meier & Frank". Sigmund became the president and Aaron Meier's widow, Jeannette Hirsch Meier, ran the store behind the scenes, having brought several half-brothers and nephews from Bavaria to work in the store.

In the great flood of 1894, the street level of Meier & Frank was three feet deep in water. Customers were brought into the store in rowboats and stepped onto raised walkways to do their shopping.

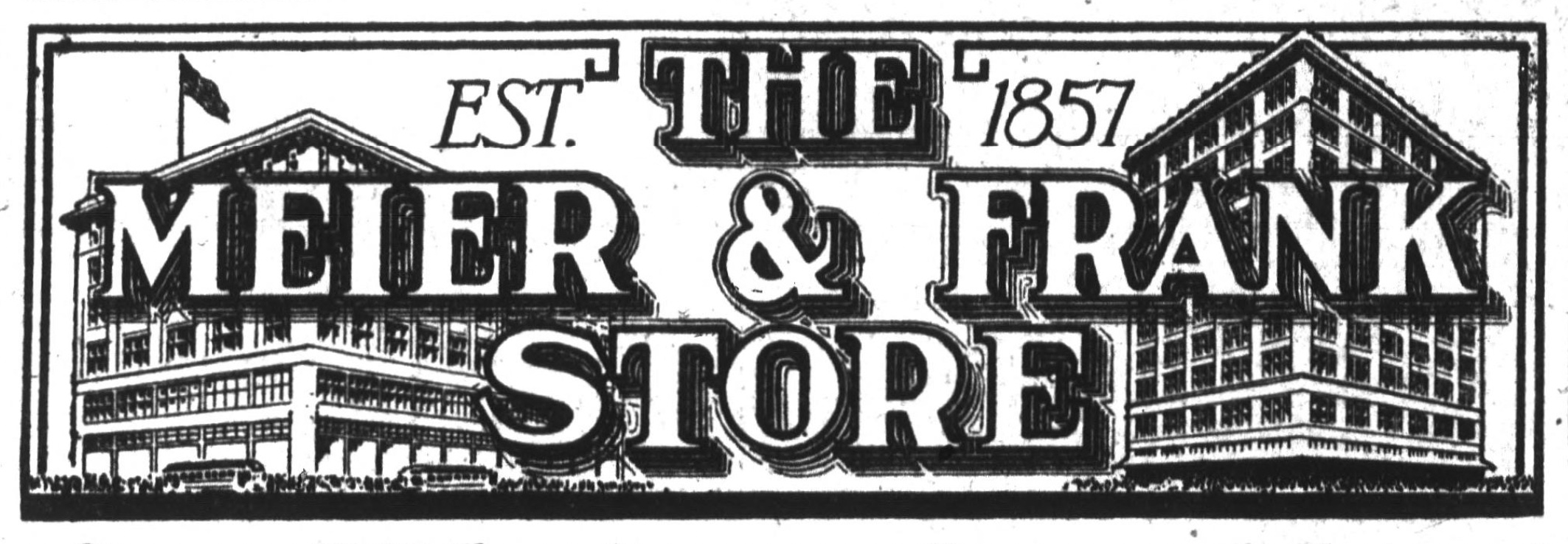
Meier & Frank Store in newspaper advertisement, 1911

Meier & Frank emerged as "One of America’s Great Stores" as it moved uptown into its elegant five-story building, 200 by 100 feet (61 m × 30 m), on 5th Street (now 5th Avenue) between Alder and Morrison in 1898. The building had two elevators and many mechanical innovations new to the Pacific Coast. The opening of the building marked the transition from the old "country store" type of operation to a modern department store. The "new look" represented 120,000 square feet (11,000 m^{2}) of floor space, 68 times more than when Aaron Meier began 40 years earlier. Meier & Frank pioneered the concept of a "money-back guarantee", until then unheard-of in merchandising.

== 20th-century history ==
=== Construction of flagship store ===
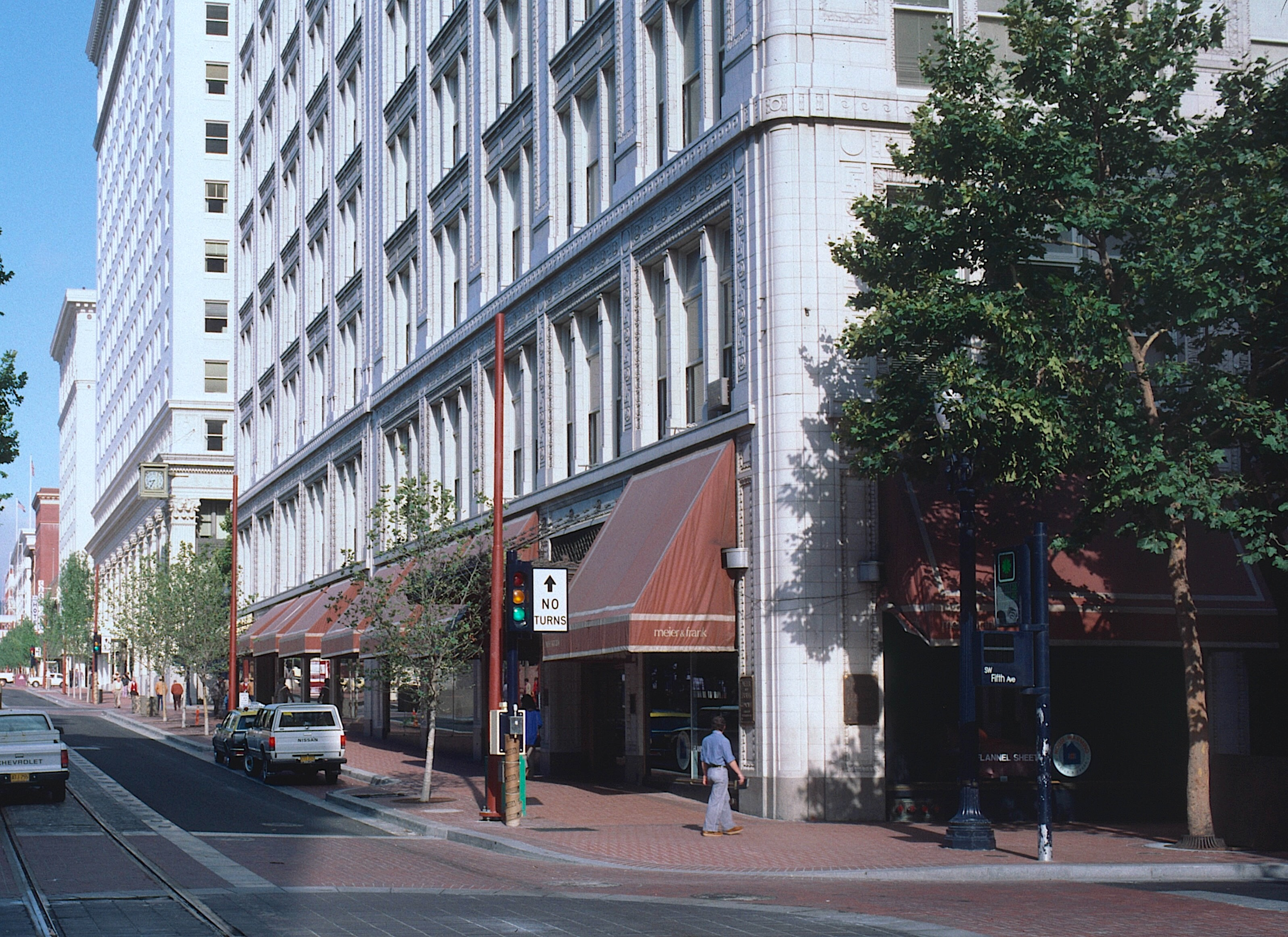
Meier & Frank's flagship store in 1985

Ten years later, the store erected an adjacent annex of 130 by 100 feet (40 m × 30 m), ten stories above the street, with two basements, making it the tallest store in the Pacific Northwest and Portland's lone skyscraper. Designed by architect A. E. Doyle, its white terra-cotta exterior set a design trend in downtown Portland, leading to the famed "wall of white" on S.W. Alder Street. Upon Sigmund Frank's death, Aaron Meier's elder son Abe Meier (1868–1930) became president, serving as the store's greeter, while his younger son, Julius (1874–1937), became vice president and general manager—running the store. The store's green delivery wagons (later its delivery trucks) were ubiquitous in Portland, with the company willing to deliver purchases of any size—even a spool of thread.

The company provided the furnishings for the Fairmount Hotel, constructed to serve out-of-town visitors to the 1905 Lewis and Clark Centennial Exposition.

In 1913, the five-story building on 5th Street was demolished, and construction began on a new sixteen-story building, which opened in 1915, giving the store 11 acres (45,000 m^{2}) of retail space. Early on, Meier & Frank was one of the few stores to maintain a buying office in New York. Sales representatives there would joke that there were four major markets on the West Coast: Los Angeles, San Francisco, Seattle, and Meier & Frank. In 1920, a full square-block garage and stockroom facility, four stories high, opened on N.W. 14th and 15th between Everett and Flanders. The Retail Reserve Building, eight stories high, opened at N.W. Irving Street between 14th and 15th in 1923. A year earlier, Meier & Frank's radio station KFEC, with its antenna atop the 16-story building, began broadcasting from its studio on the fifth floor. The station's slogan was "KFEC--The Meier & Frank Station". Meanwhile, Clark Gable worked at Meier & Frank selling neckties.

The president of Meier & Frank, Julius L. Meier, was elected governor of Oregon as an independent, and served from 1931 to 1935.

Combining the 1909 and 1915 buildings with construction on the final quarter-block and topping the consolidated building off at 17 stories, Meier & Frank now filled the entire block bounded by S.W. Alder, Morrison, 5th, and 6th. Locals jocularly referred to the store as "Murphy & Finnigan's". For a time, Meier & Frank reigned as the largest retail outlet west of the Mississippi and one of the largest stores in the nation in the early 1930s. When President Roosevelt closed banks country-wide, Meier & Frank took out a full-page newspaper ad with a single word: "Confidence". Hundreds of people brought their savings to the store for safekeeping. The store canceled interest charges on all customers' credit accounts.

When Julius Meier died in 1937, his nephew, Aaron (Bud) Meier Frank (1891–1968) became president of the store, a position he would hold for nearly 30 years, becoming the most important businessman in Portland for decades.

=== Effects of World War II ===
During World War II, Meier & Frank supported the Allied forces: Federal officials cited the store's efforts in support of the war 1941 to 1945 as the most outstanding of any department store in the United States. Meier & Frank devoted all of its newspaper advertising space to bond sales; for 1,207 continuous days the back page of the first section of The Oregonian ran ads—not to sell merchandise but to support the war effort. The store conducted the largest single sale of war bonds in the nation, a $32-million sale that lasted two weeks in the store's auditorium.

After the war, the company completed the installation of the longest continuous up/down escalator system in the world, serving all selling floors of the store and costing $1.5 million. Two years later, Meier & Frank demolished the Portland Hotel and built a two-level parking facility on a full block southwest of the store, between S.W. 6th, Broadway, Morrison, and Yamhill. In the late 1960s, Meier & Frank proposed an 11-story parking garage on the block, which the city denied after a series of heated public hearings. This proposal helped prompt the downtown business community and the city to undertake a comprehensive downtown planning program. The lot became Pioneer Courthouse Square in 1984.

=== Expansion and acquisition by May ===
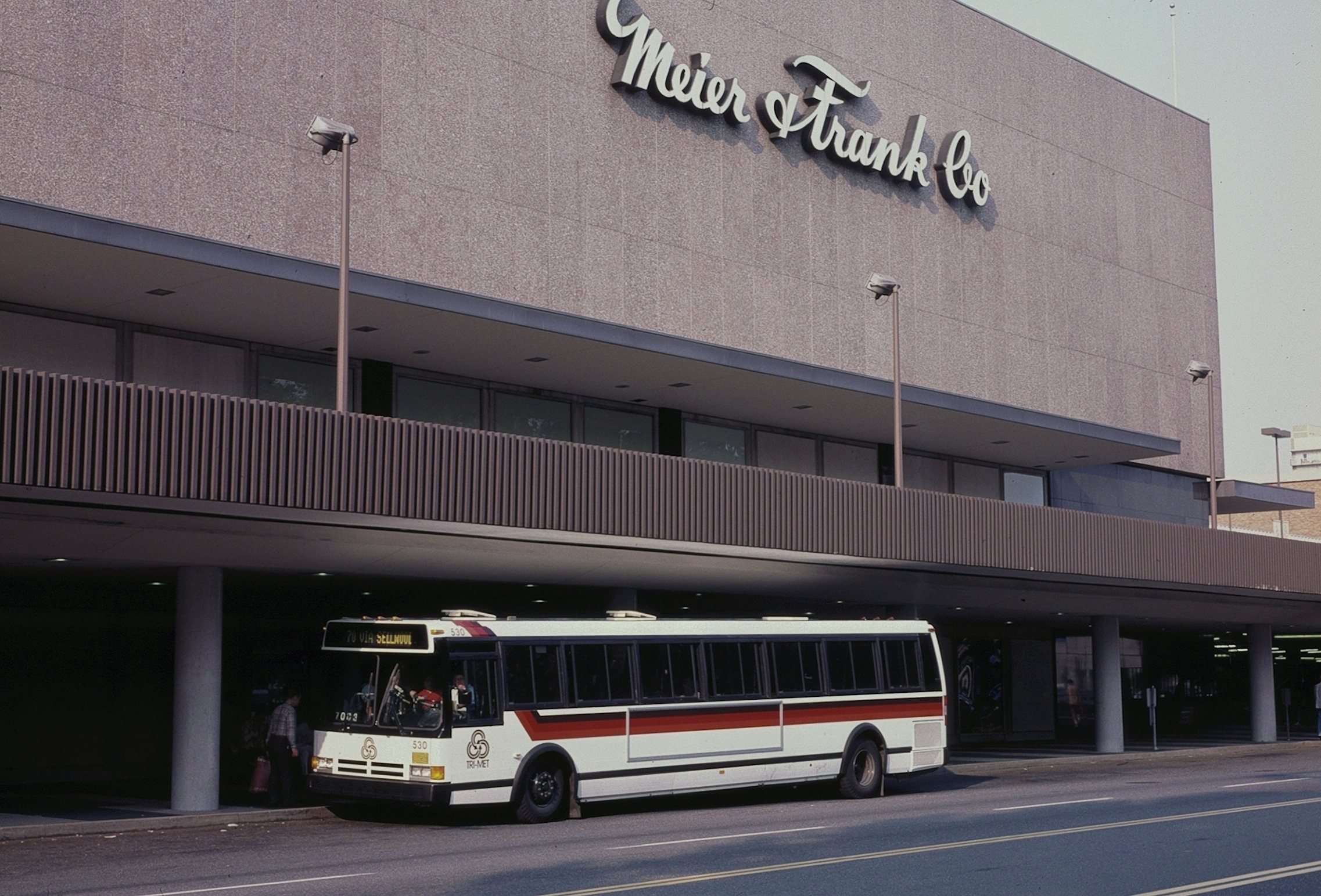
Exterior of the Lloyd Center Meier & Frank store in 1988, before the company's longtime logo using cursive lettering was changed to block capitals

Meier & Frank's first branch store, with 185,000 square feet (17,200 m^{2}), opened in Salem, Oregon, under the direction and management of Aaron Frank's son Gerry Frank (1923–2022) in 1955. It had store-side parking for 1,000 cars. Five years later Meier & Frank opened Oregon's second-largest department store (exceeded only by its own downtown store) in Northeast Portland in the new Lloyd Center, at the time the world's largest shopping center. The crown prince of Japan (later Emperor Akihito) joined the dignitaries attending the opening festivities.

From 1964 to 1966, a bitter intra-family battle erupted as stockholders considered two potential buyout offers for the store—one, supported by Aaron Frank, to sell to Carter Hawley Hale Stores for cash, and the other, supported by Jack Meier (Julius Meier's son) (1912–1988), to sell to May Department Stores for stock. Members of the Meier, Frank, and Hirsch families owned most company stock. After a lengthy and acrimonious struggle, the families eventually chose to sell to May in 1966 and Jack Meier became the store's president. Aaron Frank retired, and Gerry Frank became chief of staff to newly elected U.S. Senator Mark Hatfield, eventually earning the nickname "Oregon's Third Senator".

From 1969 to 2004, Meier & Frank opened stores at Valley River Center in Eugene (1969), Washington Square in Progress (now part of Tigard) (1973), Vancouver Mall in Vancouver, Washington (1977), Clackamas Town Center just outside Portland (1980 and 2002), Medford (1986), and Tanasbourne in Hillsboro (2004).

For 1990, the company recorded net retail sales of $284 million (equivalent to $700 million in 2025), and its figure for average sales per square foot was $149. Measuring by store units, Meier & Frank was roughly four times smaller than its closest rival within the May Department Stores family, but its average sales per square foot was the third-highest, an enviable $225 per square foot during the late 1990s.

== 21st-century history ==
=== Acquisition by Federated and conversion to Macy's ===
In 2001, May rebranded its Utah-based Zion's Co-operative Mercantile Institution (ZCMI) stores with the Meier & Frank name. A year later, Meier & Frank's operations merged with the Robinsons-May division in Los Angeles, while retaining its name. In 2005, Federated Department Stores, the parent company of Macy's, purchased May Department Stores and announced that the store (and many other venerable department store names owned by Federated) would be renamed "Macy’s". In 2001, Federated assumed the name of its largest division to become Macy's, Inc. At the close of business on September 8, 2006, use of the name Meier & Frank was officially discontinued, all remaining stores becoming Macy's the following day.

== Restaurants ==
Meier & Frank also operated several restaurants in or near its stores, all of which have now been closed. The square footage that in-store restaurants required was more profitably used to sell or store merchandise. By the late 1990s, competing against the increasing number of dining options and against mall and food court marketing efforts did not make financial sense.

- The Georgian Room, on the 10th floor - Downtown Portland (Closed in 2005 for building renovation)
- The Aladdin Restaurant, on the 3rd floor - Lloyd Center (Closed in 1990 for Lloyd Center renovation. Old space is now mall food court)
- The Homestead Restaurant, on the 2nd floor - Vancouver Mall (Closed in 2002 due to pending store expansion)
- The Valley Room Restaurant, on the 2nd floor - Washington Square (Closed in 1981 for store expansion)
- The Oregon Room, on the main floor - Salem, Oregon (Closed in 1998 for store expansion)
- The Rotunda, on the 2nd floor - Valley River Center, Eugene, Oregon

== See also ==
- List of defunct department stores of the United States
- List of department stores converted to Macy's
