= Albin Walter Norblad Sr. =

19th governor of Oregon

19th Governor of Oregon
- In office December 21, 1929 – January 12, 1931
- Preceded by: I. L. Patterson
- Succeeded by: Julius L. Meier

President of the Oregon State Senate
- In office 1929
- Preceded by: Henry L. Corbett
- Succeeded by: Willard L. Marks

Member of the Oregon Senate from the 15th district
- In office 1927–1929

Member of the Oregon Senate from the 15th district
- In office 1919–1922
- Constituency: Clatsop County

Personal details
- Born: Albin Walter Youngsberg; March 19, 1881 Malmö, Sweden-Norway (now Sweden)
- Died: April 17, 1960 (aged 79) Astoria, Oregon, U.S.
- Party: Republican
- Spouse: Edna Lyle Cates Norblad
- Profession: Lawyer

Albin Walter Norblad Sr. (March 19, 1881 – April 17, 1960) was a prominent lawyer who lived in Astoria, Oregon, United States, and the 19th governor of Oregon from 1929 to 1931. He was a Republican.

He was the father of A. Walter Norblad (1908–1964), a member of the United States House of Representatives from Oregon's 1st Congressional District from 1946 to 1964.

== Family and early life ==
Norblad was born in 1881 in Malmö (which was located in the Swedish-Norwegian Union at the time of his birth). His parents were Peter and Bessie Youngsberg. The family's surname was changed by the Swedish Government. The family emigrated to the United States while Albin was very young, settling in Grand Rapids, Michigan. He attended night classes at the Grand Rapids Business College. After earning enough credits there, Norblad was able to enroll at the University of Chicago Law School, supporting himself as a reporter for the Chicago American newspaper. Graduating in 1902, he passed the bar exam and moved back to Michigan where he set up a law firm. He was later elected District Attorney for Delta County.

== Early political career ==
Norblad moved to Astoria, Oregon in 1909 with his wife, Edna Lyle Cates Norblad (1883–1972). He began practicing law, and became involved in the community. His first government office in Oregon was as Astoria's city attorney from 1910 to 1915. He would also become a member of the local school board, and president of the Astoria Chamber of Commerce. Norblad was also involved in many fraternal and civic organizations.

Norblad went on to run for a seat in the Oregon State Senate in 1918, and served in the Senate starting in 1919. Re-elected in 1920, he attempted an abortive run for Oregon's At-large U.S. House seat in 1922. He was succeeded in the Senate in 1923 by Mary Strong Kinney (1859–1938), but won re-election to the seat in 1926. He served as President of the Oregon State Senate in 1929, placing him as second in the state's then-official line of gubernatorial succession.

== Governorship ==
After the death on December 21, 1929, of sitting Governor Isaac Patterson (1859–1929), Senate President Albin Norblad was sworn in as governor. As soon as he was inaugurated, he declared his intent to run for the Republican gubernatorial nomination.

Norblad began focusing his attention on the economic situation in the state. He formed the state's first labor commission, later to become the State of Oregon Employment Department. He authorized $2 million worth of road construction, and succeeded in employing 5,000 workers. During his term in office, the Oregon Department of Transportation and the U.S. Bureau of Public Roads worked to realign sections of the Oregon Coast Highway. Another $3 million was spent upgrading publicly owned facilities around the state. Norblad also accepted federal help in solving the dispute between Eastern Oregon's cattle and sheep ranchers. The Governor indicated his support for the pending military draft legislation working its way through Congress. He also argued for the state's acquisition of federally owned forest land. In 1931, the Modern Probation Act passed and the Oregon State Probation Commission established.

Taking office during the Great Depression, Norblad's first attempts to improve conditions in the state were largely ineffective. Lacking a political identity statewide, and considered a progressive by conservative elements in control of the state Republican party, Norblad was defeated in his primary bid in May 1930, coming in second place. When the winner of the primary unexpectedly died a month later, Norblad took his name out of the running for the nomination, giving the Republican state central committee his blessing to choose a new candidate. Defeated in his primary bid by George W. Joseph (1872–1930) who died prior to the general election, Governor Norblad handed office to the victor of the 1930 gubernatorial election, independent Julius L. Meier (1874–1937).

== Personal life ==
Norblad went back to practicing law in Astoria, once again becoming closely involved in the community. He founded the Lower Columbia Association of Chambers of Commerce, and gained a grant from the descendants of John Jacob Astor for use in the Astoria Sesquicentennial Celebration. Norblad continued his practice and civic activities in Astoria until his death on April 17, 1960. He was buried with his wife, Edna Lyle at the Rose City Cemetery, Portland, Multnomah County, Oregon.

== See also ==
- List of United States governors born outside the United States

Political offices
Preceded by I. L. Patterson	Governor of Oregon; 1929–1931	Succeeded by Julius L. Meier
