= List of Oregon judges =

This is a list of Oregon judges that have served within the confines of the United States in the state of Oregon, as well as people from Oregon that have served in federal courts outside of the state. These include judges that served prior to statehood on February 14, 1859, including the judges of the Provisional Government of Oregon. Those listed include judges of the Oregon Supreme Court, the Oregon Tax Court, and the Oregon Court of Appeals at the state level. Judges for the United States District Court for the District of Oregon and judges from Oregon that have served on other federal courts are also listed. The judges of the Oregon circuit courts, who generally serve a single county, are not listed.

== Pre-Provisional Government ==
John Kirk Townsend is recorded to have served as a judge prior to the establishment of the Provisional Government of Oregon.

Name	Years	Notes
John Kirk Townsend	1835	Oversaw murder trial of Thomas J. Hubbard at Fort William.

== Provisional Government ==
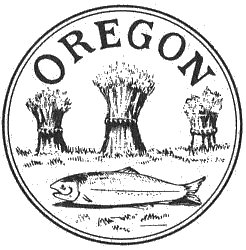
Seal of the Provisional Government

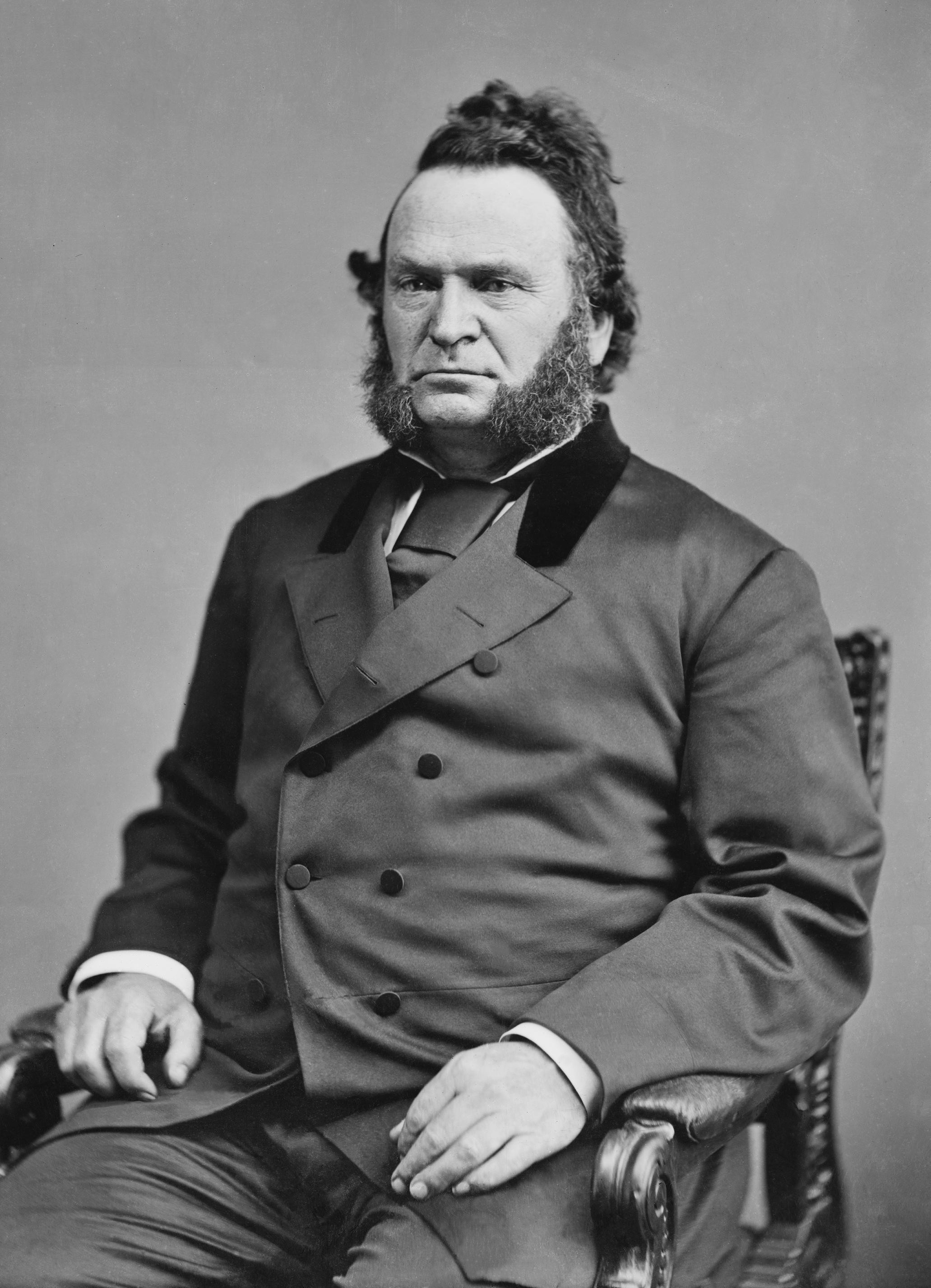
James W. Nesmith

=== Formation process of the Provisional Government ===
No formal judicial system existed in the region prior to February 18, 1841, when settlers at the Champoeg Meetings, in their effort to form a Provisional Government, elected Babcock as Supreme Judge as well as four justices of the peace and a High Sheriff as minor executive position, while they failed to establish the introduction of a governor because of discontent by French-Canadian settlers. That meant that Babcock also acted as executive and law-maker until the establishment of an Executive Committee in 1843.

Name	Years	Notes
Ira Babcock	February 18, 1841 – May 2, 1843	Elected at Champoeg Meetings to be the first Supreme Judge with probate powers, dealt with Ewing Young estate.

=== Creation of the Provisional Government ===
On May 2, 1843, the Provisional Government of Oregon was finally created through a narrow 52–50 vote under the English American and French Canadian settlers. This government constructed a judicial system headed by a single Supreme Judge.

Name	Years	Notes
Albert E. Wilson	July 5, 1843 (elected)	Elected at Champoeg Meetings, but declined to serve.
Osborne Russell	October 2, 1843 – May 14, 1844	Served as circuit judge and presiding judge
Ira L. Babcock	June 27, 1844 – November 11, 1844	Served as circuit judge and presiding judge
James W. Nesmith	December 25, 1844 – August 9, 1845	Appointed by Executive Committee before election in 1845, served as circuit judge and presiding judge.
Nathaniel Ford	August 9, 1845 (elected)	Elected by Provisional Legislature, but declined to serve.
Peter Hardeman Burnett	September 6, 1845 – December 29, 1846	Elected by legislature as supreme judge.
J. Quinn Thornton	February 20, 1847 – November 9, 1847	Appointed by Governor George Abernethy as supreme judge.
Columbia Lancaster	November 30, 1847 – April 9, 1849	Appointed by Governor George Abernethy as supreme judge.
Asa Lovejoy	no record	Elected by Provisional Legislature on February 16, 1849 as supreme judge.

== Oregon Supreme Court ==
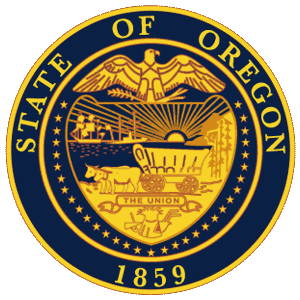
Seal of the State of Oregon

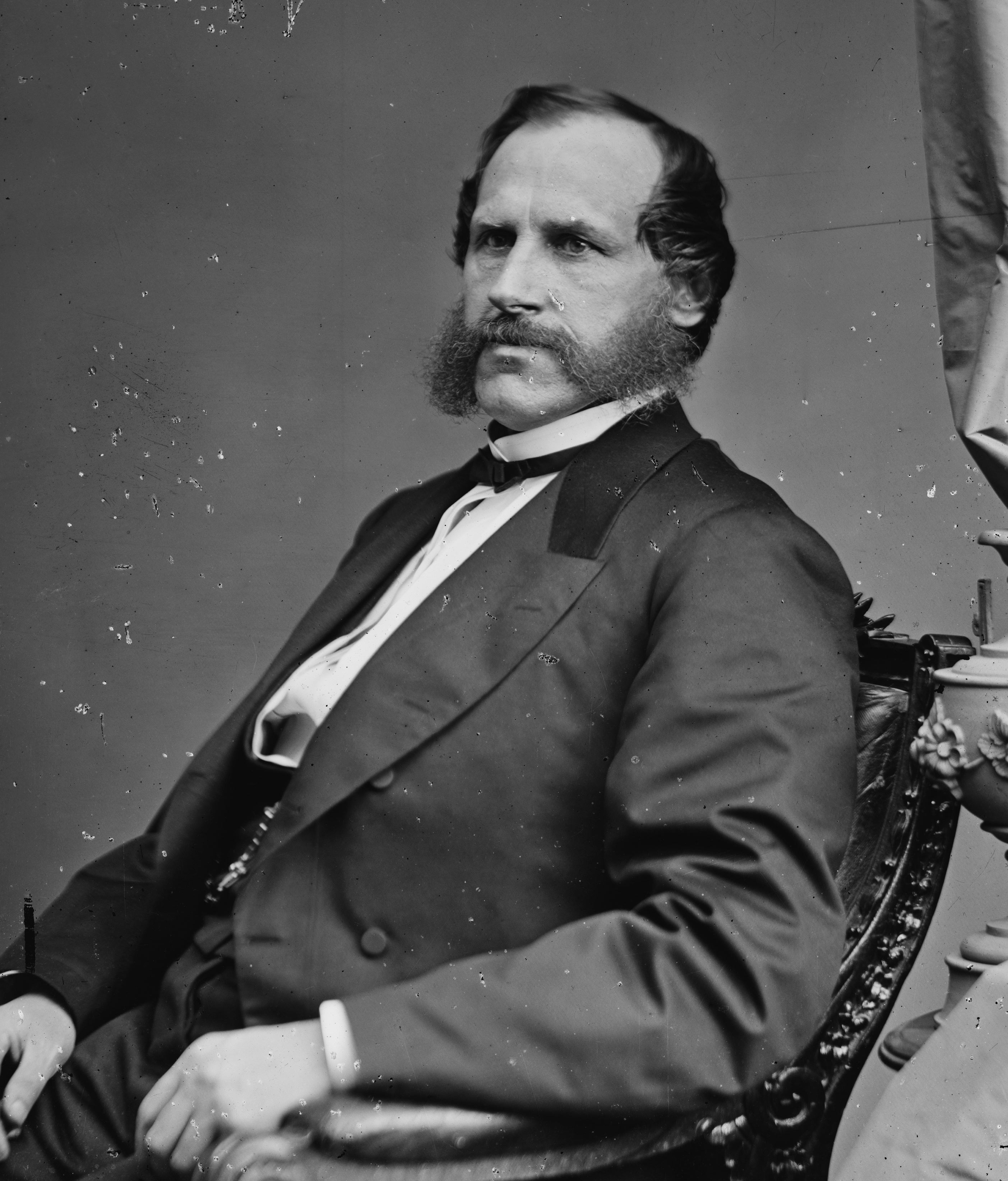
George Henry Williams

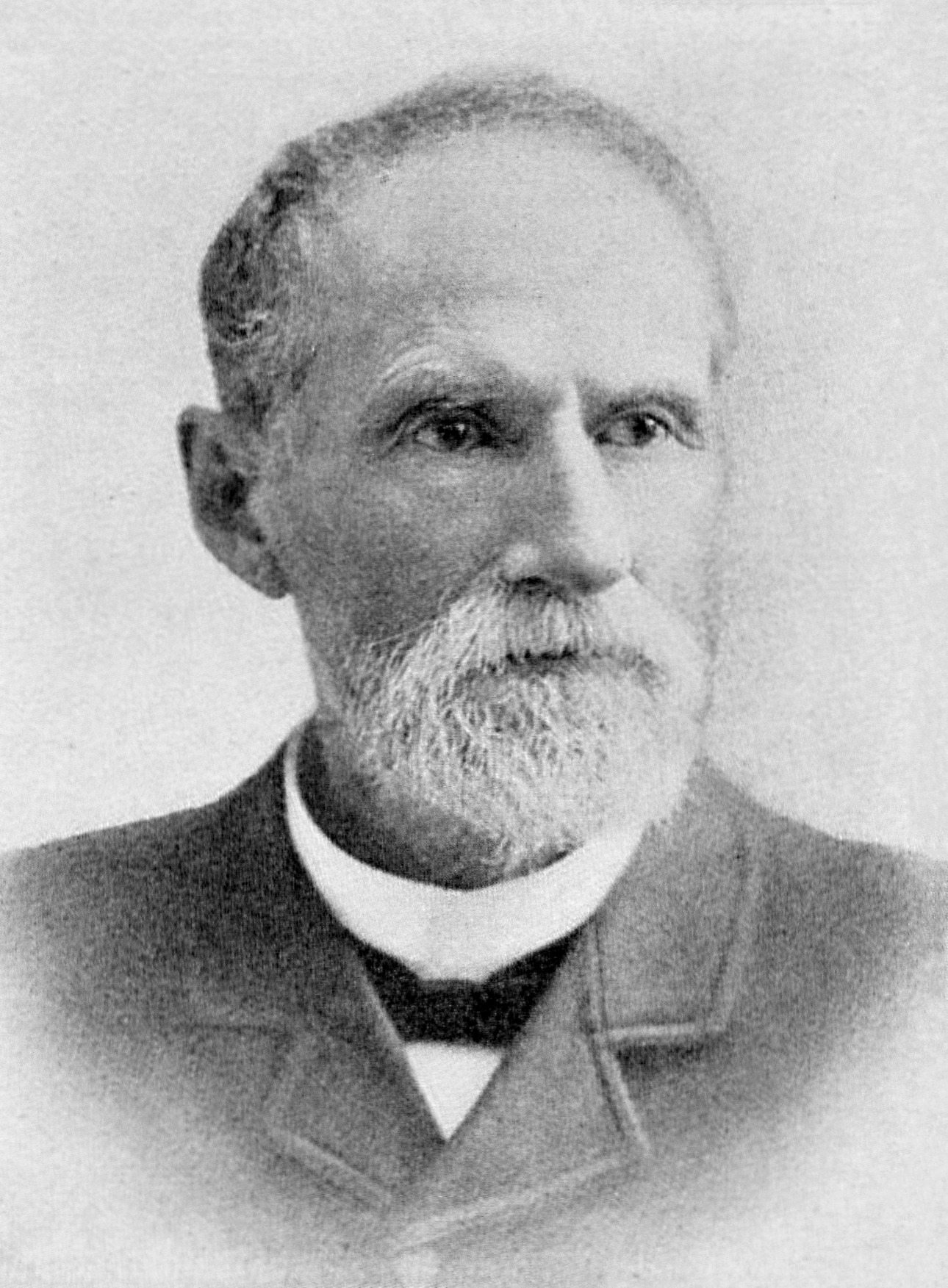
Reuben P. Boise

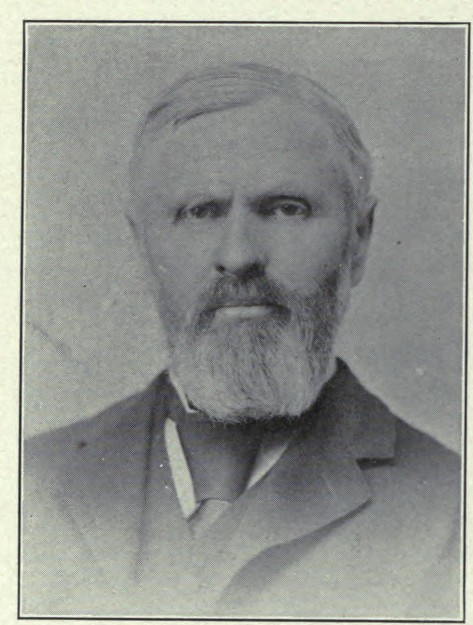
Erasmus D. Shattuck

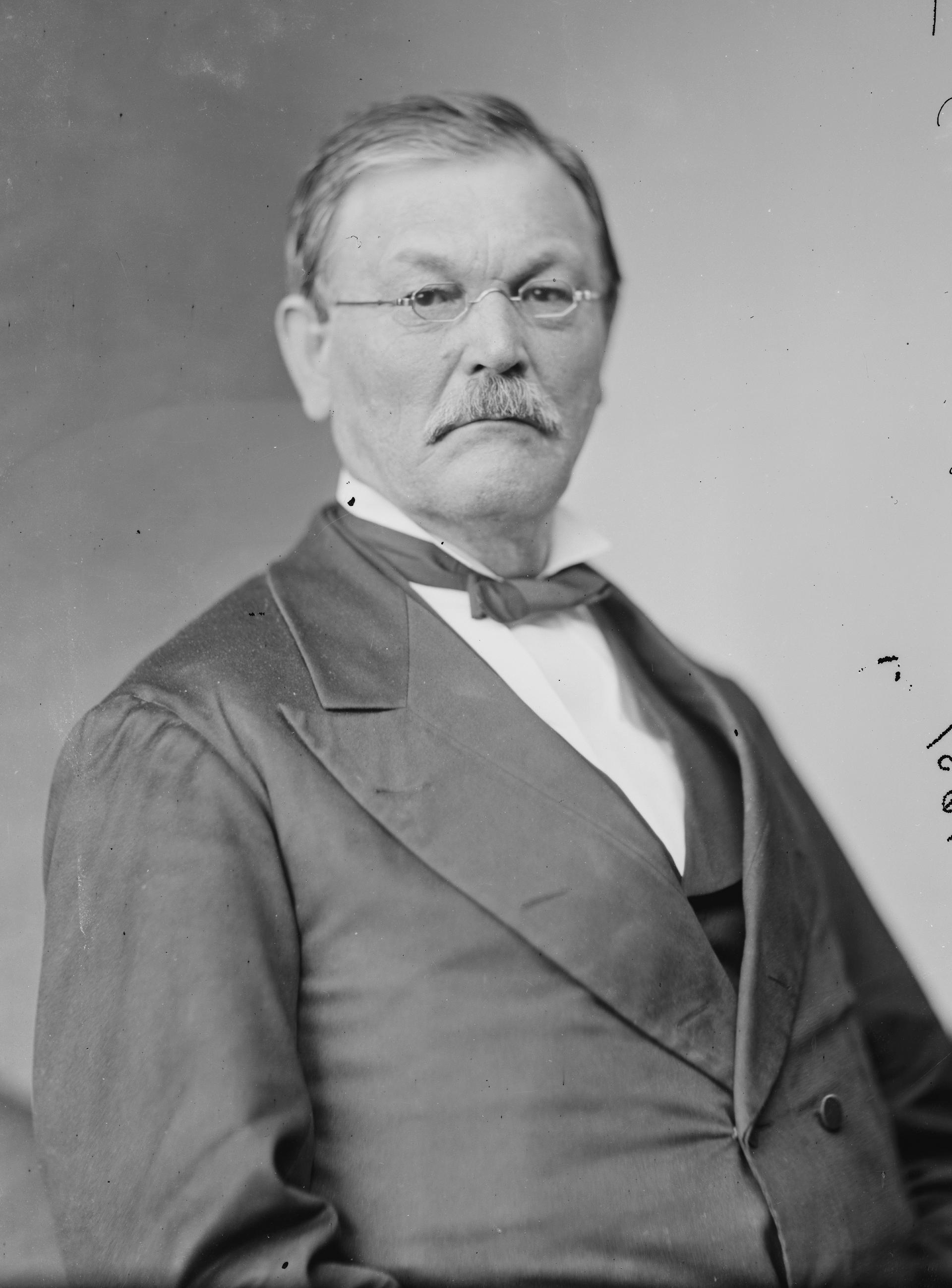
James Kerr Kelly

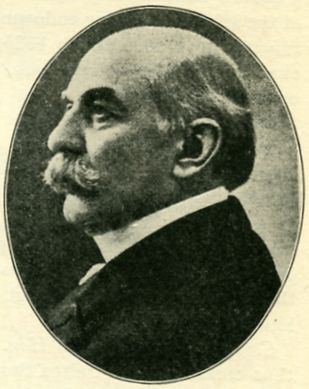
William Paine Lord

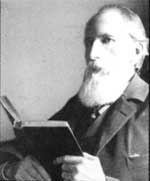
John B. Waldo

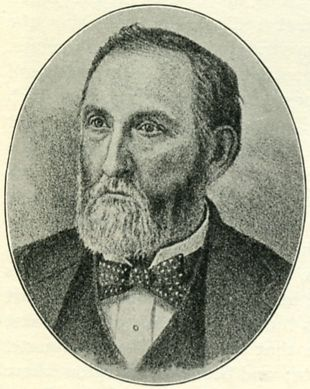
William Wallace Thayer

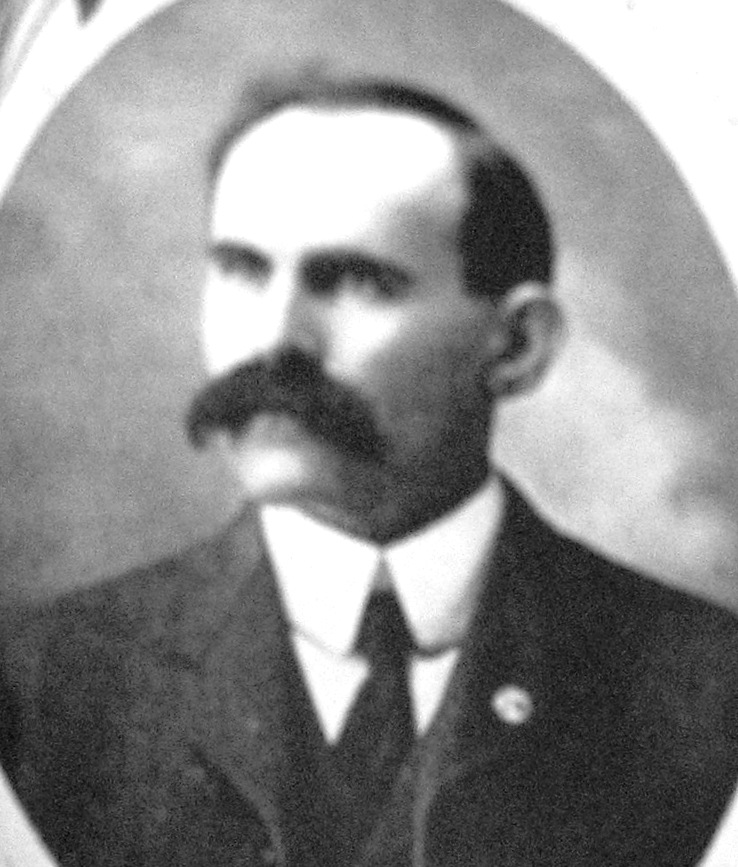
Woodson T. Slater

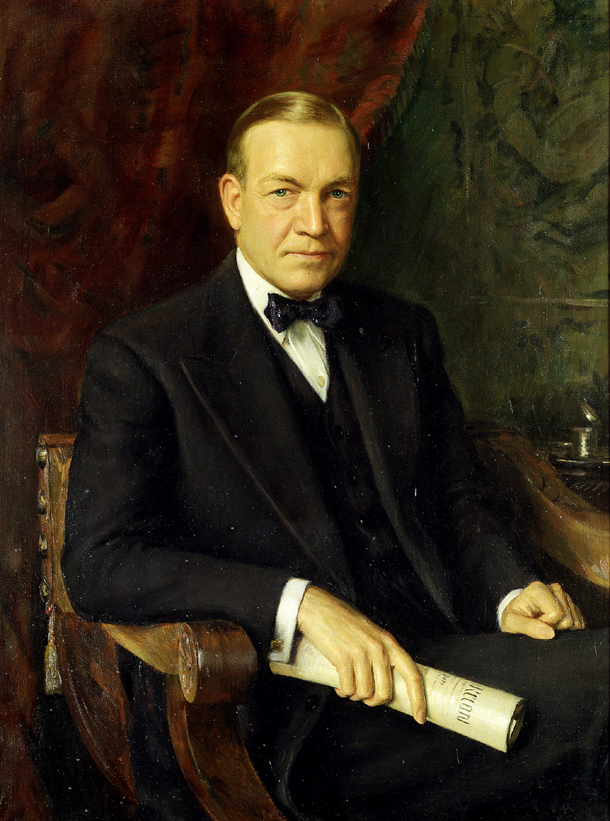
Charles L. McNary

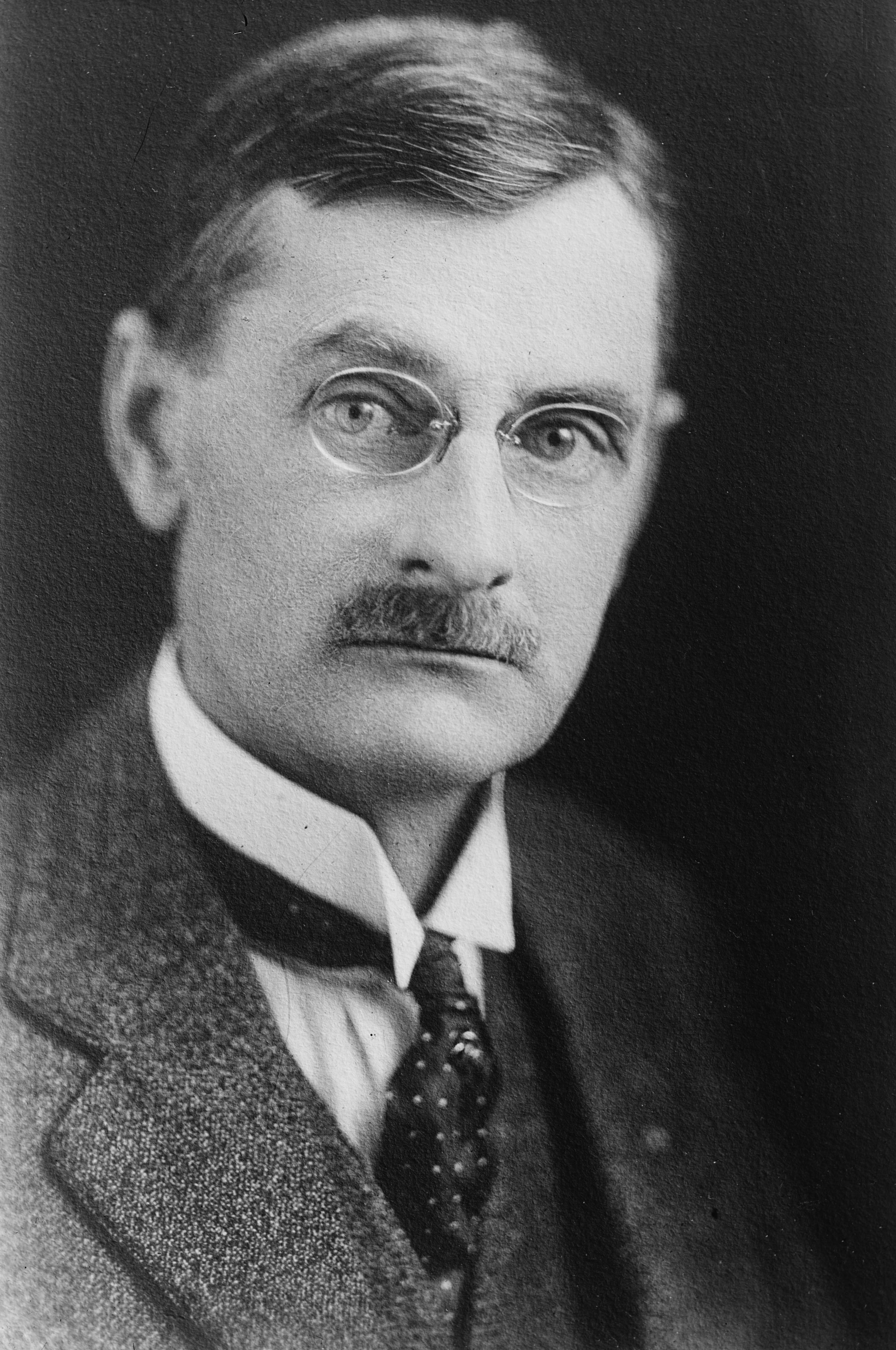
Wallace McCamant

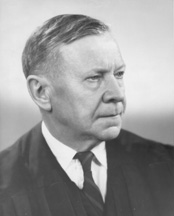
Hall S. Lusk

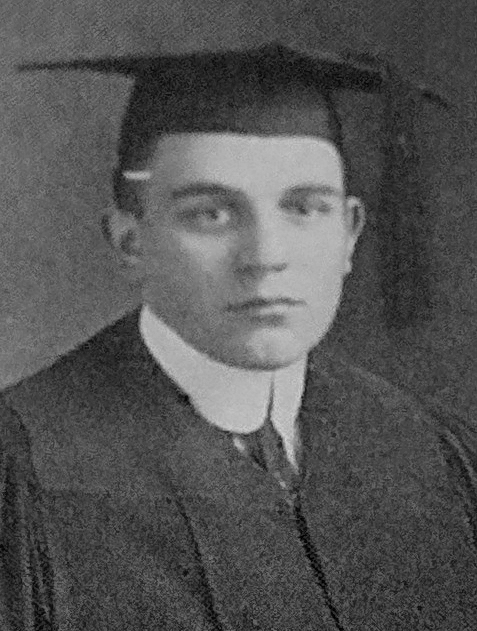
E. M. Page

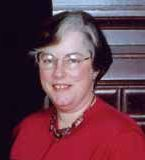
Susan P. Graber

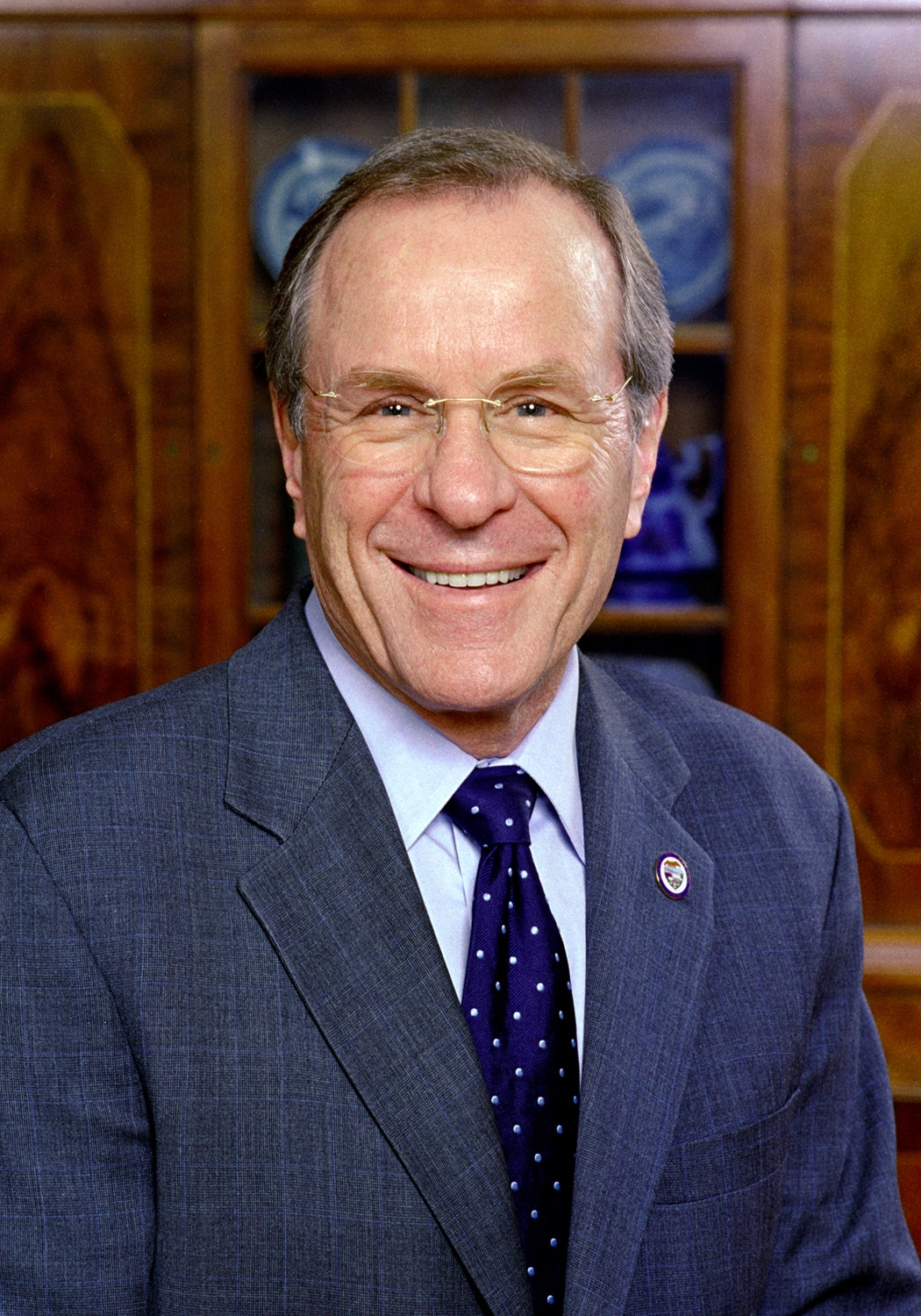
Ted Kulongoski

The Oregon Territory was created in 1848 by the United States Congress. Congress then created a three judge supreme court for the territory. In 1859, the territory became the state of Oregon, with the Oregon Supreme Court remaining, eventually expanded to seven justices.

Order	Name	Years on the Court	Chief justice	Notes
1.	William P. Bryant	1848–1850	1848–1850	Appointed by U.S. President.
2.	Orville C. Pratt	1848–1852		Appointed by U.S. President.
3.	Thomas Nelson	1850–1853	1850–1853	Appointed by U.S. President.
4.	William Strong	1850–1853		Appointed by U.S. President.
5.	George Henry Williams	1853–1858	1853–1858	Appointed by U.S. President, 1853–1858.
6.	Cyrus Olney	1853–1858		Appointed by U.S. President.
7.	Matthew Deady	1853–1859		Appointed by U.S. President.
8.	Obadiah B. McFadden	1853–1854		Appointed by U.S. President.
9.	Reuben P. Boise	1858–1870, 1876–1880	1862–1864, 1867–1870	Appointed by U.S. President in 1858, elected in 1859, 1876. Appointed by Governor 1878. 1862–1864, 1867–1870.
10.	Aaron E. Waite	1859–1862	1859–1862	Elected in 1858, 1859–1862.
11.	Riley E. Stratton	1859–1866		Elected in 1858, died in office December 26, 1866.
12.	Paine Page Prim	1859–1880	1864–1866, 1870–1872, 1876–1878	Appointed by Governor in 1859 and 1878, elected 1860, 1866, 1872. 1864–1866, 1870–1872, and 1876–1878.
13.	William W. Page	1862		Appointed by Governor.
14.	Erasmus D. Shattuck	1862–1867, 1874–1878	1866–1867	Elected in 1862, 1874. 1866–1867.
15.	Joseph G. Wilson	1862–1870		Appointed by Governor in 1862, elected 1864.
16.	Alonzo A. Skinner	1866–1867		Appointed by Governor in 1866.
17.	William W. Upton	1867–1874	1872–1874	Appointed by Governor 1867, elected in 1868.
18.	John Kelsay	1868–1870		Elected in 1868.
19.	Benoni Whitten	1870		Appointed by Governor in 1870.
20.	Lewis Linn McArthur	1870–1878		Elected in 1870 and 1876.
21.	Andrew J. Thayer	1870–1873		Elected in 1870, died in office April 26, 1873.
22.	Benjamin F. Bonham	1870–1876	1874–1876	Elected in 1870.
23.	Lafayette F. Mosher	1873–1874		Appointed by Governor in May 1873.
24.	John Burnett	1874–1876		Elected in 1874.
25.	James F. Watson	1876–1878		Elected in 1876.
26.	James Kerr Kelly	1878–1880	1878–1880	Appointed by Governor in 1878.
27.	William Paine Lord	1880–1894	1880–1882, 1886–1888, 1892–1894	Elected in 1880, 1882, and 1888. 1880–1882, 1886–1888, and 1892–1894.
28.	Edward B. Watson	1880–1884	1882–1884	Elected in 1880.
29.	John B. Waldo	1880–1886	1884–1886	Elected in 1880.
30.	William Wallace Thayer	1884–1890	1888–1890	Elected in 1884.
31.	Reuben S. Strahan	1886–1892	1890–1892	Elected in 1886.
32.	Robert S. Bean	1890–1909	1894–1896, 1900–1902, 1905–1909	Elected in 1890, 1896, 1902, 1908.
33.	Frank A. Moore	1892–1918	1896–1898, 1902–1905, 1909–1911, 1915–1917	Elected in 1892, 1898, 1904, 1910, 1916. Died in office September 25, 1918.
34.	Charles E. Wolverton	1894–1905	1898–1900, 1905	Elected in 1894 and 1900.
35.	Thomas G. Hailey	1905–1907		Appointed by Governor in 1905.
36.	Robert Eakin	1907–1917	1911–1913	Elected in 1906 and 1912.
37.	William R. King	1909–1911		Appointed by Governor in 1909.
38.	Woodson T. Slater	1909–1911		Appointed by Governor in 1909.
39.	Thomas A. McBride	1909–1930	1913–1915, 1917–1921, 1923–1927	Appointed by Governor in 1909, elected in 1914, 1920, and 1926. Died in office September 9, 1930.
40.	Henry J. Bean	1911–1941	1931–1933 1937–1939	Elected in 1910, 1914, 1920, 1926, 1932, and 1938. Died in office May 8, 1941.
41.	George H. Burnett	1911–1927	1921–1923, 1927	Elected in 1910, 1916, and 1922. Died in office September 10, 1927.
42.	Charles L. McNary	1913–1915		Appointed in 1913.
43.	William Marion Ramsey	1913–1915		Appointed in 1913.
44.	Henry L. Benson	1915–1921		Elected in 1914, 1920. Died in office October 16, 1921.
45.	Lawrence T. Harris	1915–1924		Elected in 1914 and 1920.
46.	Wallace McCamant	1917–1918		Appointed by Governor in 1917.
47.	Charles A. Johns	1918–1921		Appointed by Governor in 1918. Elected in 1918.
48.	Conrad P. Olson	1918–1919		Appointed by Governor in 1918.
49.	Alfred S. Bennett	1919–1920		Elected in 1918.
50.	George M. Brown	1920–1933		Appointed by Governor in 1920. Elected in 1920 and 1926.
51.	John McCourt	1921–1924		Appointed by Governor in 1921. Elected in 1922. Died in office September 12, 1924.
52.	John L. Rand	1921–1942	1927–1929, 1933–1935, 1939–1941	Appointed by Governor in 1921. Elected in 1922, 1928, 1934, and 1940. Died in office November 19, 1942.
53.	Oliver P. Coshow	1924–1931	1929–1931	Appointed by Governor in 1924. Elected in 1924.
54.	Martin L. Pipes	1924		Appointed by Governor in 1924.
55.	Harry H. Belt	1925–1950	1945–1947	Elected in 1924, 1930, 1936, 1942, 1948. Died in office August 6, 1950.
56.	George Rossman	1927–1965	1947–1949	Appointed by Governor in 1927. Elected in 1928, 1934, 1940, 1946, 1952, and 1958.
57.	Percy R. Kelly	1930–1949	1941–1943	Appointed by Governor in 1930. Elected in 1930, 1936, 1942, and 1948. Died in office June 14, 1949.
58.	James U. Campbell	1931–1937	1935–1937	Elected in 1930 and 1936. Died in office July 16, 1937.
59.	John O. Bailey	1933–1950	1943–1945	Elected in 1932, 1938, and 1944.
60.	Hall S. Lusk	1937–1960, 1961–1968	1949–1951	Appointed by Governor in 1937. Elected in 1938, 1944, 1950, 1956. Temporary service from 1961 to 1968.
61.	James T. Brand	1941–1958	1951–1953	Appointed by Governor in 1941. Elected in 1942, 1948 and 1952.
62.	Arthur D. Hay	1942–1952		Appointed by Governor in 1942. Elected in 1944 and 1950. Died in office December 19, 1952.
	Walter C. Winslow	1947–1948		Served as judge pro tempore while Brand served as war crimes judge following World War II.
63.	E. M. Page	1949-1950		Appointed by Governor in 1949.
64.	Earl C. Latourette	1950–1956	1953–1955	Appointed by Governor in 1950. Elected in 1950. Died in office August 18, 1956.
65.	Harold J. Warner	1950–1963	1955–195	Appointed by Governor in 1950. Elected in 1950 and 1956.
66.	Walter L. Tooze	1950–1956		Appointed by Governor in 1950. Elected in 1950 and 1956. Died in office December 21, 1956.
67.	William C. Perry	1952–1970	1957–1959, 1967–1970	Appointed by Governor in 1952. Elected in 1954, 1960, and 1966.
68.	William M. McAllister	1956–1976	1959–1967	Appointed by Governor in 1956. Elected in 1956, 1962, 1968, and 1974.
69.	Randall B. Kester	1957–1958		Appointed by Governor in 1957.
70.	Gordon Sloan	1958–1970		Appointed by Governor in 1958. Elected in 1958 and 1964.
71.	Kenneth J. O'Connell	1958–1977	1970–1976	Appointed by Governor in 1958. Elected in 1958, 1964, and 1970.
72.	Alfred Goodwin	1960–1969		Appointed by Governor in 1960. Elected in 1960 and 1966.
73.	Arno H. Denecke	1963–1982	1976–1982	Elected in 1962, 1968, 1974, and 1980.
74.	Ralph M. Holman	1965–1980		Elected in 1964, 1970, and 1976.
75.	Thomas Tongue	1969–1982		Appointed by Governor in 1969. Elected in 1970 and 1976.
76.	Edward H. Howell	1970–1980		Appointed by Governor in 1970. Elected in 1970 and 1976.
77.	Dean F. Bryson	1970–1979		Elected in 1970 and 1976, also appointed by Governor in 1970.
78.	Berkeley Lent	1977–1988	1982–1983	Elected in 1976 and 1982.
79.	Hans A. Linde	1977–1990		Appointed by Governor in 1977. Elected in 1978 and 1984.
80.	Edwin J. Peterson	1979–1993	1983–1991	Appointed by Governor in 1979. Elected in 1980, 1986, and 1992.
81.	Jacob Tanzer	1980–1982		Appointed by Governor in 1980. Elected in 1980.
82.	J. R. Campbell	1980–1988		Appointed by Governor in 1980. Elected in 1982.
83.	Betty Roberts	1982–1986		Appointed by Governor in 1982. Elected in 1982. First woman on court.
84.	Wallace P. Carson Jr.	1982–2007	1991–2006	Appointed by Governor in 1982. Elected in 1982, 1988, 1994 and 2000.
85.	Robert E. Jones	1983–1990		Appointed by Governor in 1982. Elected in 1984.
86.	W. Michael Gillette	1986–2011		Appointed by Governor in 1986. Elected in 1986, 1992, 1998, and 2004.
87.	George Van Hoomissen	1988–2001		Elected in 1988 and 1994.
88.	Edward N. Fadeley	1988–1998		Elected in 1988 and 1994.
89.	Richard Unis	1990–1996		Appointed by Governor in 1990. Elected in 1990.
90.	Susan P. Graber	1990–1998		Appointed by Governor in 1990 and 1991. Elected in 1992.
91.	Robert D. Durham	1994–2013		Appointed by Governor in 1994. Elected in 1994, 2000, and 2006.
92.	Ted Kulongoski	1997–2001		Elected in 1996.
93.	Susan M. Leeson	1998–2003		Appointed by Governor in 1998. Elected in 1998.
94.	R. William Riggs	1998–2006		Appointed by Governor in 1998. Elected in 1998 and 2004.
95.	Paul J. De Muniz	2001–2013	2006–2012	Elected in 2000 and 2006.
96.	Thomas A. Balmer	2001–2022	2012–2018	Appointed by Governor in 2001. Elected in 2002, 2008, and 2014.
97.	Rives Kistler	2003–2018		Appointed by Governor in 2003. Elected in 2004, 2010, and 2016.
98.	Martha Lee Walters	2006–2022	2018–2022	Appointed by Governor in 2006. Elected in 2008 and 2014.
99.	Virginia Linder	2007–2015		Elected in 2006 and 2012.
100.	Jack L. Landau	2011–2017		Elected in 2010 and 2016.
101.	David V. Brewer	2013–2017		Elected in 2012.
102.	Richard C. Baldwin	2013–2017		Elected in 2012.
103.	Lynn Nakamoto	2016–2021		Appointed by Governor in 2015. Elected in 2016.
104.	Meagan Flynn	2017–present	2022–present	Appointed by Governor in 2017.
105.	Rebecca Duncan	2017–present		Appointed by Governor in 2017.
106.	Adrienne Nelson	2018–2023		Appointed by Governor in 2018.
106.	Christopher L. Garrett	2019–present		Appointed by Governor in 2018.
107.	Roger DeHoog	2022–present		Appointed by Governor in 2022.
108.	Stephen Bushong	2023–present		Appointed by Governor in 2022.
109.	Bronson James	2023–present		Appointed by Governor in 2022.
110.	Aruna Masih	2023–present		Appointed by Governor in 2023.

== Oregon Court of Appeals ==
In 1969, the state of Oregon created an intermediate level appeals court. Judges from the Oregon Court of Appeals decide cases appealed from the Oregon Circuit Court. The court has a total of thirteen judgeships.

Name	Years	Notes
Virgil Langtry	1969–1976	Appointed by governor in 1969. Elected in 1970. Resigned in 1976.
Robert H. Foley	1969–1976	Appointed by governor in 1969. Elected in 1970. Resigned in 1976.
Herbert M. Schwab	1969–1980	Appointed by governor in 1969. Elected in 1970 & 1976. Resigned in 1980. Chief judge 1969–1980.
William S. Fort	1969–1977	Appointed by governor in 1969. Elected in 1970.
Edward H. Branchfield	1969–1971	Appointed by governor in 1969.
Robert Y. Thornton	1971–1983	Elected in 1970 & 1976.
Jacob Tanzer	1973–1975, 1976–1980	Appointed by governor in 1973 & 1976. Elected in 1976. Resigned in 1980.
Jason Lee	1975–1980	Elected in 1974. Died in office February 19, 1980.
Lee Johnson	1977–1978	Elected in 1976. Resigned in 1978.
William L. Richardson	1976–1997	Elected in 1976, 1982, 1988, and 1994. Appointed by governor in 1976. Resigned in 1997. Chief judge 1993–1997.
John H. Buttler	1977–1992	Appointed by governor in 1977. Elected in 1978, 1984, and 1990. Resigned in 1992.
George M. Joseph	1977–1992	Appointed by governor in 1977. Elected in 1978, 1984, and 1990. Resigned in 1992. Chief judge 1981–1992.
W. Michael Gillette	1977–1986	Appointed by governor in 1977. Elected in 1978 & 1984. Resigned in 1986.
Betty Roberts	1977–1982	Appointed by governor in 1977. Elected in 1978. Resigned in 1982.
J. R. Campbell	1979–1980	Appointed by governor in 1979. Elected in 1980. Resigned in 1980.
John C. Warden	1980–1988	Appointed by governor in 1980 & 1981. Elected in 1982. Resigned in 1988.
Edward H. Warren	1980–1999	Appointed by governor in 1980. Elected in 1980, 1986 & 1992. Resigned in 1999.
George Van Hoomissen	1981–1988	Elected in 1980 & 1986. Resigned in 1988.
Thomas F. Young	1981–1988	Appointed by governor in 1981. Elected in 1982. Died in office on January 3, 1988.
Kurt C. Rossman	1982–1994	Appointed by governor in 1982. Elected in 1982 & 1988. Resigned in 1994.
Jonathan Uhry Newman	1983–1991	Elected in 1982 & 1988. Resigned in 1991.
Mary J. Deits	1986–2004	Appointed by governor in 1986. Elected in 1986, 1992, & 1998. Chief judge 1997–2004.
R. William Riggs	1988–1998	Appointed by governor in 1988. Elected in 1988 & 1994. Resigned in 1998.
Susan P. Graber	1988–1990	Appointed by governor in 1988. Elected in 1988. Resigned in 1990.
Walter I. Edmonds Jr.	1989–2009	Appointed by governor in 1989. Elected in 1990, 1996, 2002, and 2008.
Paul De Muniz	1990–2000	Appointed by governor in 1990. Elected in 1990 & 1996. Resigned in 2000.
Robert D. Durham	1991–1994	Appointed by governor in 1991. Elected in 1992. Resigned in 1994.
Jack L. Landau	1993–2010	Appointed by governor in 1992. Elected in 1994, 2000, & 2006.
Susan M. Leeson	1993–1998	Appointed by governor in 1992. Elected in 1994. Resigned in 1998.
Rick Haselton	1994–2015	Appointed by governor in 1994. Elected in 1994, 2000, & 2006.
Rex Armstrong	1995–2021	Elected in 1994, 2000, & 2006.
Virginia L. Linder	1999–2007	Appointed by governor in 1997. Elected in 1998 & 2004. Resigned in 2007.
Robert D. Wollheim	1998–2014	Appointed by governor in 1998. Elected in 1998 & 2004.
David V. Brewer	1999–2013	Appointed by governor in 1999. Elected in 2000 & 2006. Chief judge 2004–2012.
Rives Kistler	1999–2003	Appointed by governor in 1999. Elected in 2000. Resigned in 2003.
David Schuman	2001–2013	Appointed by governor in 2001. Elected in 2002 and 2008.
Darleen Ortega	2003–present	Appointed by governor in 2003. Elected in 2004.
Ellen Rosenblum	2005–2011	Appointed by governor in 2005. Elected in 2006.
Timothy Sercombe	2007–2017	Appointed by governor in 2007. Elected in 2008.
Rebecca Duncan	2010–2017	Appointed by governor in 2010.
Lynn Nakamoto	2011–2016	Appointed by governor in 2010.
Erika L. Hadlock	2011–2019	Appointed by governor in 2011.
James C. Egan	2013–present	Elected in 2012.
Joel DeVore	2013–2021	Appointed by governor in 2013.
Erin C. Lagesen	2013–present	Appointed by governor in 2013.
Douglas L. Tookey	2013–present	Appointed by governor in 2013.
Chris Garrett	2014–2018	Appointed by governor in 2014.
Scott A. Shorr	2016–present	Appointed by governor in 2015.
Roger DeHoog	2016–2022	Appointed by governor in 2015.
Steven Powers	2017–present	Appointed by governor in 2017.
Bronson James	2017–2022	Appointed by governor in 2017.
Robyn Aoyagi	2017–present	Appointed by governor in 2017.
Josephine Mooney	2019–present	Appointed by governor in 2019.
Jacqueline Kamins	2020–present	Appointed by governor in 2020.
Ramón A. Pagán	2022–present	Appointed by governor in 2022.
Kristina Hellman	2022–present	Appointed by governor in 2022.
Anna M. Joyce	2022–present	Appointed by governor in 2022.
Megan Jacquot	2023–present	Appointed by governor in 2022.

== Federal district court ==
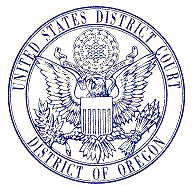
Seal of the District of Oregon

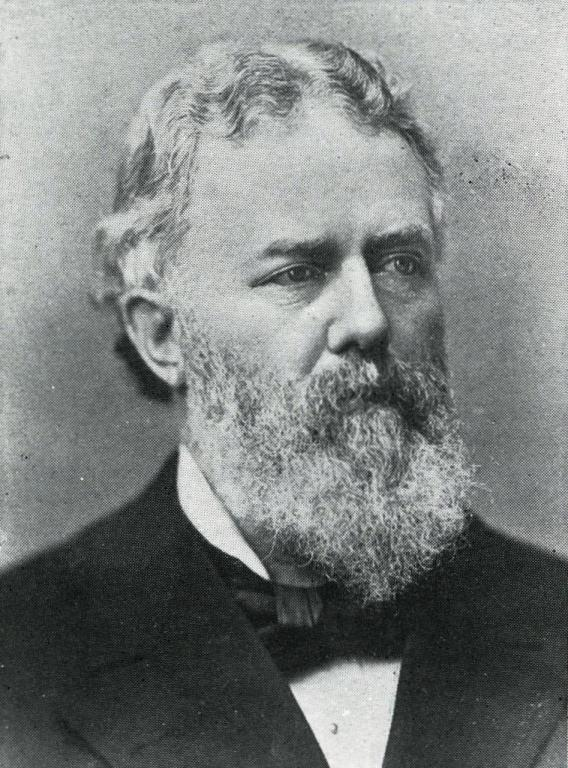
Matthew Deady

Upon Oregon's entry into the Union, the federal government created the United States District Court for the District of Oregon, a federal trial level court. At first there was a single judge, but currently there are six judgeships. Those who have served as the chief judge are listed in italics.

Order	Name	Years on the Court	Notes
1.	Matthew Deady	1859–1893	
2.	Charles B. Bellinger	1893–1905	
3.	Charles E. Wolverton	1905–1926	
4.	Robert S. Bean	1909–1931	
5.	John H. McNary	1927–1936	
6.	James A. Fee	1931–1954	Chief judge from 1948 to 1954.
7.	Claude C. McColloch	1937–1959	Chief judge from 1954 to 1958.
8.	Gus J. Solomon	1949–1987	Chief judge from 1958 to 1971.
9.	William G. East	1955–1985	
10.	John Kilkenny	1959–1969	
11.	Robert C. Belloni	1967–1999	Chief judge from 1971 to 1976.
12.	Alfred Goodwin	1969–1971	
13.	James M. Burns	1972–2001	Chief judge from 1979 to 1984.
14.	Otto Richard Skopil Jr.	1972–1979	Chief judge from 1976 to 1979.
15.	Helen J. Frye	1980–2011	
16.	Owen M. Panner	1980–2018	Chief judge from 1984 to 1990.
17.	James A. Redden	1980–2020	Chief judge from 1990 to 1995.
18.	Edward Leavy	1984–1987	
19.	Malcolm F. Marsh	1987–present	
20.	Robert E. Jones	1990–present	
21.	Michael R. Hogan	1991–2012	Chief judge from 1995 to 2002.
22.	Ancer L. Haggerty	1994–present	Chief judge from 2002 to 2009.
23.	Ann Aiken	1998–present	Chief judge from 2009 to 2016.
24.	Garr King	1998–2019	
25.	Anna J. Brown	1999–present	
26.	Michael W. Mosman	2003–present	Chief judge from 2016 to 2019.
27.	Marco A. Hernandez	2011–present	Chief judge from 2019 to 2023.
28.	Michael H. Simon	2011–present	
29.	Michael J. McShane	2013–present	Chief judge from 2024 to present.
30.	Karin Immergut	2019–present	
31.	Adrienne Nelson	2023–present	
32.	Amy M. Baggio	Designate	

== Other federal ==
Seal of the Ninth Circuit Court of Appeals

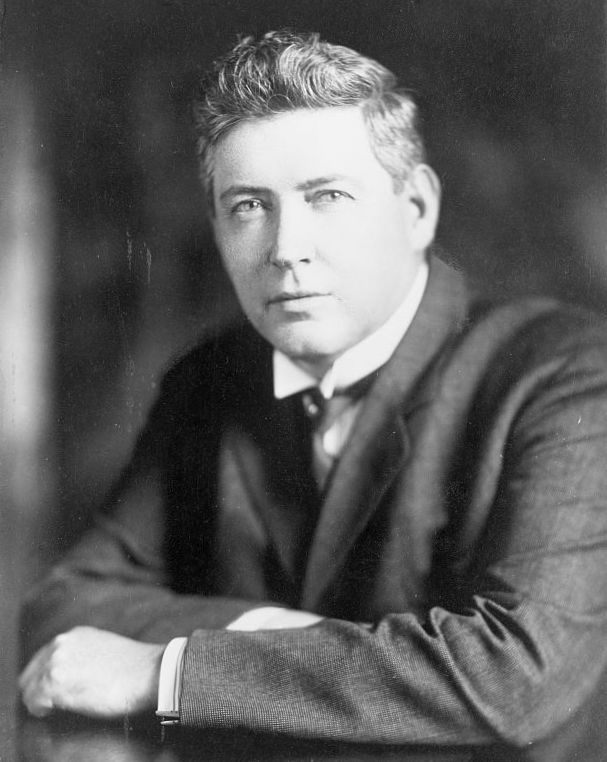
Nicholas J. Sinnott

Judges from Oregon who have served on federal courts other than the District Court of Oregon. This includes judges who have been assigned to the Ninth Circuit Court of Appeals' duty station at the Pioneer Courthouse in Portland, Oregon.

Name	Court	Years	Notes
William A. Ekwall	United States Customs Court	1942–1956	Nominated by President Franklin D. Roosevelt.
James Alger Fee	Ninth Circuit Court of Appeals	1954–1959	Nominated by President Eisenhower
Danielle J. Forrest	Ninth Circuit Court of Appeals	2019–present	Nominated by President Donald Trump on September 19, 2019.
William Ball Gilbert	Ninth Circuit Court of Appeals	1892–1931	Nominated by President Harrison
Alfred Goodwin	Ninth Circuit Court of Appeals	1971–2022	Chief judge of the court from 1988 to 1991.
Susan P. Graber	Ninth Circuit Court of Appeals	1998–present	President Bill Clinton nominated Graber on July 30, 1997.
Bert Emory Haney	Ninth Circuit Court of Appeals	1935–1943	Nominated by Franklin Roosevelt
John Kilkenny	Ninth Circuit Court of Appeals	1969–1971	Assumed senior judge status in 1971.
Edward Leavy	Ninth Circuit Court of Appeals	1987–2023	Assumed senior status on the court in 1997.
Wallace McCamant	Ninth Circuit Court of Appeals	1925–1926	Served as a recess appointment, never confirmed by Senate.
Diarmuid O'Scannlain	Ninth Circuit Court of Appeals	1986–present	Nominated by President Ronald Reagan on August 11, 1986.
Nicholas J. Sinnott	United States Court of Claims	1928–1929	Nominated by President Calvin Coolidge on July 20, 1929.
Jennifer Sung	Ninth Circuit Court of Appeals	2021–present	Nominated by President Joe Biden on July 13, 2021.
Otto Richard Skopil Jr.	Ninth Circuit Court of Appeals	1979–1986	Nominated by President Jimmy Carter on June 14, 1979.

== Oregon Tax Court ==
In 1962, the state of Oregon created a specialized court to handle state tax cases. The Oregon Tax Court consists of a single state-wide elected judge.

Name	Years	Notes
Peter M. Gunnar	1962–1965	Appointed by governor in 1962. Elected in 1962. Resigned in 1965.
Edward H. Howell	1965–1970	Appointed by governor in 1965. Elected in 1966. Resigned in 1970.
Carlisle B. Roberts	1970–1983	Appointed by governor in 1970. Elected in 1970 & 1976.
Samuel B. Stewart	1983–1985	Elected in 1982. Died in office on February 25, 1985.
Carl N. Byers	1985–2001	Appointed by governor in 1985. Elected in 1986, 1992, & 1998. Retired in 2001.
Henry C. Breithaupt	2001–2017	Appointed by governor in 2001. Elected in 2002, 2008 & 2014. Retired at the end of 2017.
Robert T. Manicke	2018–present	Appointed by governor in January 2018. Elected to full six-year term in November 2018.

== See also ==
- Lists of Oregon-related topics
