= George Van Hoomissen =

American judge

George A. Van Hoomissen
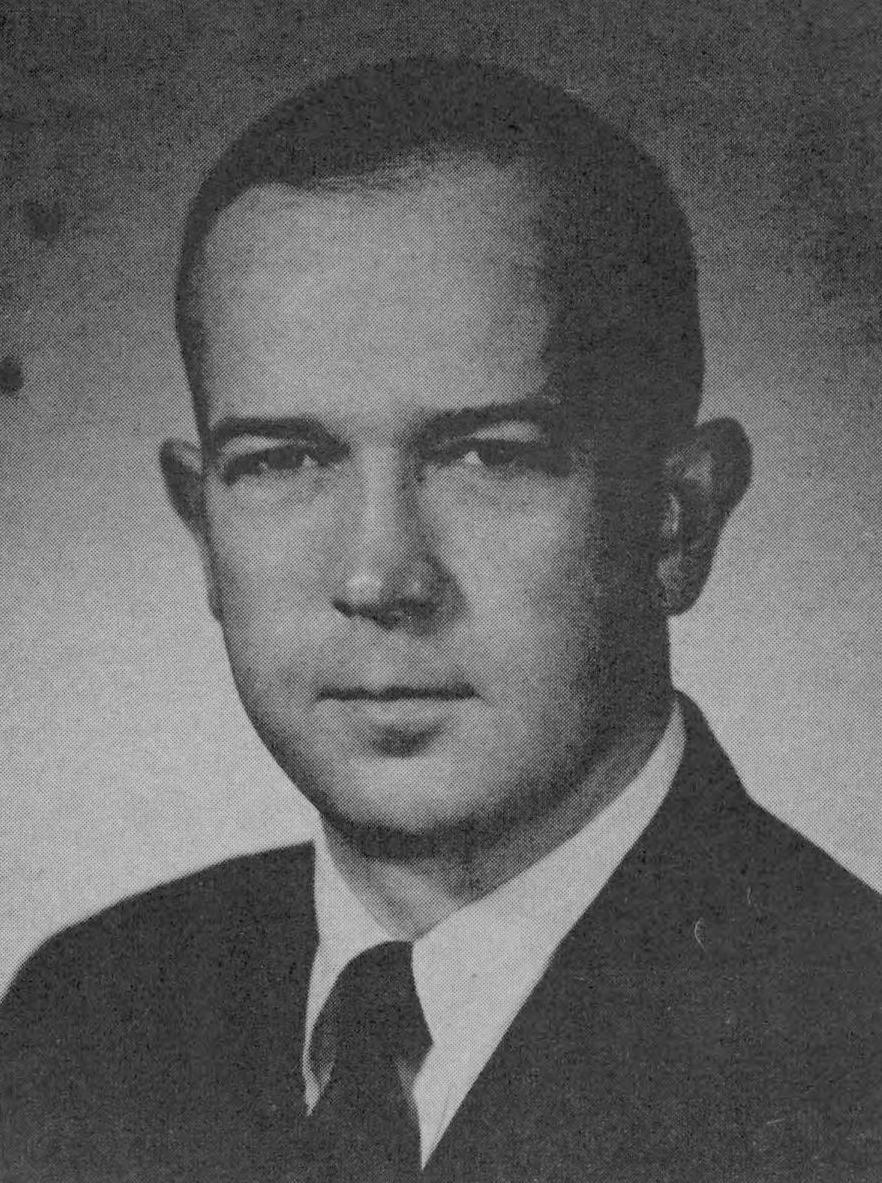

87th Justice of the Oregon Supreme Court
- In office 1988–2001
- Preceded by: Berkeley Lent
- Succeeded by: Paul J. De Muniz

Judge of the Oregon Court of Appeals
- In office 1981–1988
- Preceded by: J. R. Campbell
- Succeeded by: R. William Riggs

Personal details
- Born: March 7, 1930 (age 96) Portland, Oregon
- Party: Democratic

George Albert Van Hoomissen (born March 7, 1930) is an American attorney in the state of Oregon. He previously served as the 87th justice of the Oregon Supreme Court and previously served as a judge of the Oregon Court of Appeals. The Portland, Oregon native was also the district attorney for Multnomah County, Oregon, and served as a Democrat in the Oregon Legislative Assembly.

== Early life ==
George Van Hoomissen was born in Portland, Oregon, in 1930. His primary education was parochial, and he graduated from Central Catholic High School in Portland in 1947. He then went on to the University of Portland where he earned a bachelor's degree in business in 1951. Van Hoomissen then joined the United States Marines and served in that branch during the Korean War. In the Marines he attained the rank of colonel. After serving in the armed forces he attended law school at Georgetown University School of Law where he earned a Juris Doctor in 1955 and an LL.M. in labor law in 1957. In 1986 he completed his education with an LL.M in judicial process from the University of Virginia School of Law.

== Legal career ==
After law school, Van Hoomissen worked as a law clerk for the chief justice of the Oregon Supreme Court from 1957 until 1959. In 1959, he went into private legal practice in Portland and served as a 28-year-old Democrat to the Oregon Legislature. Van Hoomissen won re-election to the Oregon House of Representatives in 1960. In 1962, he began an eight-year stint as the district attorney (DA) for Multnomah County after defeating Charles E. Raymond in the election. As the DA he hired future Oregon Supreme Court justices Jacob Tanzer and W. Michael Gillette, and future judges Garr M. King, George M. Joseph, and William L. Richardson. He won re-election in 1966 and 1970, but ran unsuccessfully in 1968 for the Secretary of State office losing to Clay Myers by approximately 12,000 votes. In 1971, he resigned as the DA and moved to Texas to become dean of the National College of District Attorneys and a professor at the University of Houston’s Bates College of Law.

=== Judicial career ===
In 1973, Van Hoomissen returned to Oregon and was appointed as a judge for Multnomah County. From 1973 to 1978 he worked in the Department of Domestic Relations, and from 1978 until leaving the court in 1981 he worked in the General Trial Department. In 1980, Van Hoomissen was elected to the Oregon Court of Appeals to replace J. R. Campbell who had resigned to join the Oregon Supreme Court, beginning service in 1981. Van Hoomissen won re-election to a second six-year term in 1986, and then resigned from the court on September 30, 1988.

He resigned to join the Oregon Supreme Court after winning the election to replace Berkeley Lent on May 17, 1988. While on the court Van Hoomissen wrote the majority opinion in Portland General Elec. Co. v. Bureau of Labor and Industries, 317 Or. 606, 859 P.2d 1143 (1993), the court's most cited opinion. In 1996, he wrote the majority opinion overturning voter approved Measure 8 in Oregon State Police Officers' Ass'n v. State, 323 Or. 356, 918 P.2d 765 (1996), holding that the measure violated the United States Constitution’s Contract Clause. Van Hoomissen won a second six-year term on the state's highest court in 1994 and then resigned on December 31, 2000, at the end of that second term after not seeking re-election.

== Later life ==
Van Hoomissen is a senior judge for the state of Oregon, allowing the Supreme Court Chief Justice to appoint him to any judicial position on a temporary basis. He also works as a private mediator and taught at the Oregon Law Institute. He previously served as president of the Oregon District Attorneys Association and the Oregon Appellate Judges Association.
