= Oregon Parks Forever =

U.S. non-profit organization

- Predecessor: Oregon State Parks Foundation; Oregon State Parks Trust
- Established: May 13, 1995; 30 years ago
- Type: Nonprofit
- Tax ID no.: 93-1177836
- Registration no.: 501(c)(3)
- Purpose: Support Oregon parks
- Headquarters: 1501 S.W. Jefferson Street, Portland, Oregon
- Location: U.S.A.
- Coordinates: 45.517587°N 122.68924°W
- Region served: Oregon
- Board Chair: Brigitte Sutherland
- Executive Director: Seth Miller
- Board of directors: Brigitte Sutherland; Kevin Price; Katie DiBiase; Jan McGowan; Brian Harney; Randy Jones; Seth Miller; Danny Newman; Eric Valentine
- Website: https://www.orparksforever.org/

Oregon Parks Forever (formerly the Oregon State Parks Foundation) is a U.S. non-profit organization dedicated to the preservation and enhancement of state parks in Oregon. The organization is an independent organization with staff and a board. Its mission is "raise funds to enhance and preserve special places and experiences in Oregon's parks, now and for generations to come, and to encourage and promote an outdoor lifestyle."

== History ==
The organization was established as the Oregon State Parks Trust on May 16, 1995 and registered as a charitable organization with the Oregon Department of Justice on June 19, 1995.

The Oregon State Parks have not been funded by the State General Fund (Taxes) since 1998. In 1998, the voters approved measure 66, which allocated 15% of the State Lottery proceeds to Parks & Natural Resources. The amount of money from the Lottery for parks is fixed by law at 7.5% of the Lottery proceeds, which are subject to different fluctuations than the expenses of the State Parks. 12% of the funds must go to County Parks, leaving 6.6% available for the State Parks.

In 2020, the Oregon State Parks Foundation changed their name to "Oregon Parks Forever" and updated their mission to include all public land agencies across the state.

Oregon Parks Forever made a $39,875 donation in 2020 to pay for installing popular hiker-biker pods at three of five locations — Beverly Beach, Beachside, Honeyman, Sunset Bay or Humbug Mountain.

In July 2021, Oregon Parks Forever established a "Wildfire Tree Replanting Fund", with a goal of planting "at least a million trees after the recent wildfires".

== See also ==
- List of Oregon state parks
