= Martha Lee Walters =

American judge (born 1950)

Martha Walters
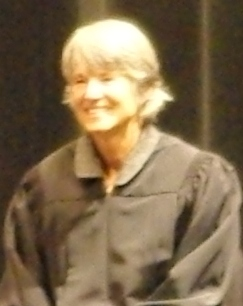

Chief Justice of the Oregon Supreme Court
- In office July 1, 2018 – December 31, 2022
- Preceded by: Thomas A. Balmer
- Succeeded by: Meagan Flynn

Justice of the Oregon Supreme Court
- In office October 9, 2006 – December 31, 2022
- Appointed by: Ted Kulongoski
- Preceded by: R. William Riggs
- Succeeded by: Bronson James

Personal details
- Born: October 23, 1950 (age 74); Grand Rapids, Michigan, U.S.
- Spouse: John VanLandingham
- Education: University of Michigan (BA); University of Oregon (JD)

Martha Lee Walters (born October 23, 1950) is an American labor attorney who served as the 43rd chief justice of Oregon from 2018 to 2022; she was a member of the court from 2006 to 2022. She became the first female justice on the state's highest court in three years when she was appointed in 2006 and the first female chief justice when she was elected by her fellow justices in 2018. A native of Michigan, she worked on the Casey Martin lawsuit against the PGA Tour while in private legal practice.

== Early life and education ==
Walters was born on October 23, 1950, in Grand Rapids, Michigan, where she grew up. After high school she attended the University of Michigan, where she graduated in 1972 with a Bachelor of Arts degree. Walters earned a Juris Doctor from the University of Oregon School of Law in Eugene, Oregon, graduating in 1977 and earning Order of the Coif.

== Career ==
Walters was the founder and president of the Eugene law firm of Walters, Chanti & Zennache. In 1998, she was given the Public Justice Award by the Oregon Trial Lawyers. She served as a delegate to the National Conference of Commissioners on Uniform State Laws and as a member of the American Law Institute. While in private practice, she was a specialist in employment and labor law. She represented disabled golfer Casey Martin in his lawsuit against the PGA Tour to allow Martin to use a golf cart during tournaments.

She was appointed to the Oregon Supreme Court as a justice by Governor Ted Kulongoski and was sworn into office on October 9, 2006, to replace Justice R. William Riggs who had retired. Walters was the first female justice on the court since 2003 when Susan M. Leeson left the court. In 2007, Walters was elected as the president of the Uniform Law Commission, becoming that organization's first female president. Walters won election to a full six-year term on the court in 2008, and was re-elected in 2014.

In June 2018, Walters was elected as chief justice of Oregon by her colleagues on the Supreme Court, and replaced Thomas A. Balmer in that role effective July 1, 2018. In October 2022, Walters announced her retirement effective December 31, 2022.

== Personal life ==
Walters is married to John VanLandingham IV, a low-income housing advocate and mobile home-housing specialist. The couple has two children.

Legal offices
Preceded by R. William Riggs	Justice of the Oregon Supreme Court; 2006–2022	Succeeded by Bronson James
Preceded by Thomas A. Balmer	Chief Justice of the Oregon Supreme Court; 2018–2022	Succeeded by Meagan Flynn
