= J. R. Campbell =

J. R. Campbell may refer to:

- J. R. Campbell (communist) (1894–1969), British communist activist and editor
- J. R. Campbell (judge) (1918–1990), American judge in Oregon
