= Rives Kistler =

American judge (born 1949)

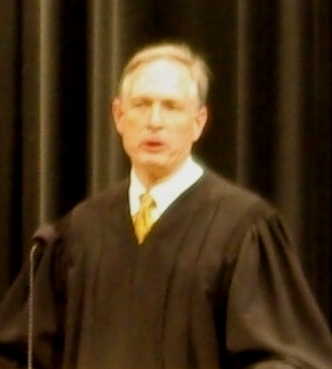
- Kistler in 2009

Justice of the Oregon Supreme Court
- In office August 15, 2003 – December 31, 2018
- Appointed by: Ted Kulongoski
- Preceded by: Susan M. Leeson
- Succeeded by: Christopher L. Garrett

Judge of the Oregon Court of Appeals
- In office 1999–2003
- Appointed by: John Kitzhaber
- Preceded by: R. William Riggs
- Succeeded by: Darleen Ortega

Personal details
- Born: 1949 (age 76–77)
- Education: Williams College (BA); University of North Carolina, Chapel Hill (MA); Georgetown University (JD)
- Website: Official website

Rives Kistler (born 1949) is an American attorney and judge in the state of Oregon. After college and law school on the East Coast, he moved to Oregon where he worked in private practice before joining the Oregon Department of Justice. Kistler then joined the Oregon Court of Appeals before appointment to the Oregon Supreme Court in 2003.

== Education ==
Rives Kistler earned his undergraduate degree at Williams College in Williamstown, Massachusetts, earning a BA. He then earned a master's degree at the University of North Carolina before attending law school. Justice Kistler graduated summa cum laude from Georgetown University Law Center in 1981. After graduation, he served as a law clerk for Charles Clark, Chief Judge of the United States Court of Appeals for the Fifth Circuit, and for Justice Lewis F. Powell Jr. of the Supreme Court of the United States.

== Legal career ==
On completing his clerkships, Kistler went into private practice as a litigation associate for Stoel Rives LLP in Portland, Oregon from 1983 to 1987. He then moved to the Oregon Department of Justice as an Assistant Attorney General, representing the state in civil and criminal appeals before the state and federal courts from 1987 to 1999.

Kistler began his judicial career in 1999 when Oregon Governor John Kitzhaber appointed him to the Oregon Court of Appeals. He started service on that court on January 14, 1999, replacing R. William Riggs who had been elevated to the Oregon Supreme Court. Kistler served on Oregon's intermediate court of appeals until August 14, 2003, when he was himself appointed to the Oregon Supreme Court.

On August 15, 2003, he was appointed to the Oregon Supreme Court to replace Susan M. Leeson who had resigned. Appointed by governor Ted Kulongoski, he won election to a full six-year term in 2004, winning 60 percent of the vote. He ran unopposed for re-election in 2010, winning a second six-year term. In addition to his judicial work, Kistler has taught state constitutional law as an adjunct professor at Lewis & Clark Law School in Portland, Oregon. He is a former member and vice-chair of the Oregon Board of Bar Examiners and a former member of the National Association of Attorneys General Working Groups on criminal law, federalism, and free speech; he served as chair of the working group on free speech.

Kistler is openly gay, and at the time of his appointment was the only openly LGBTQ state supreme court justice in the United States. The second was fellow Oregonian Virginia Linder, who joined Kistler on the Oregon court in 2007. Kistler was previously one of twelve openly LGBT state supreme court justices who served in the United States.

== See also ==
- List of law clerks for the first seat of the Supreme Court of the United States
- List of LGBT jurists in the United States
- List of LGBT state supreme court justices in the United States
- List of LGBT people from Portland, Oregon

Legal offices
Preceded by Susan M. Leeson	Justice of the Oregon Supreme Court; 2003–2018	Succeeded by Christopher L. Garrett
