= Darleen Ortega =

American judge

Judge on the Oregon Court of Appeals
- Incumbent
- Assumed office 2003
- Appointed by: Ted Kulongoski
- Preceded by: Rives Kistler

Personal details
- Born: Darleen Mock c. 1962 (age 63–64) Montebello, California
- Education: George Fox University; University of Michigan J.D.
- Occupation: Attorney, jurist

Darleen Ortega (born c. 1962) is an American attorney and judge in the state of Oregon. A native of California, she has served on the Oregon Court of Appeals since 2003. She is the first woman of Hispanic heritage and the first woman of color to serve on that court.

== Early life ==
Ortega was born Darleen Mock in Montebello, California, to a European-American father and Mexican-American mother. She grew up in the Los Angeles area until age 10 when her family moved to Banks, Oregon, west of Portland. There she graduated from Banks High School in 1980 as a valedictorian. She went on to college at George Fox College (now George Fox University) in Newberg, Oregon. She graduated in 1984 with a bachelor of arts degree in writing and literature, earning summa cum laude honors.

Ortega married, becoming Darleen Darnall, and enrolled at the University of Michigan Law School. She graduated in 1989 with her Juris Doctor cum laude. After passing the bar, she entered private legal practice in Detroit, Michigan, and lived in Michigan with her husband until 1992. In 1992, Ortega returned to Oregon and began working at the Portland law firm of Bullivant Houser Bailey, remaining until 1995. She moved to another Portland firm, Davis Wright Tremaine, in 1995 where she remained until 2003, becoming partner in 1998. In 2002, she took her maternal grandparents' last name, Ortega. She has been active in the Oregon State Bar, served on the board of directors to the Oregon Adoption & Family Services as well as a center at Oregon Health & Science University and on the board for the Oregon Women Lawyers group (OWLS).

== Political career ==
On August 4, 2003, Oregon Governor Ted Kulongoski appointed Ortega to the Oregon Court of Appeals to replace Rives Kistler, who had been elevated to the Oregon Supreme Court. Ortega joined the court on October 13, 2003, and won election to a full six-year term on the court in 2004. She was the first woman of Hispanic heritage and the first woman of color to serve on the court. In 2005, she signed off on an opinion of the court that determined that under the Oregon Constitution, law enforcement must obtain a search warrant prior to searching trash placed on the curb for pick-up.

Ortega was re-elected to the Court of Appeals in 2010 and 2016, and her current term ends on January 1, 2023.

In 2017, Oregon Supreme Court justice Jack Landau announced his retirement. The Oregon State Bar included Ortega on its list of nine high-qualified candidates that Governor Kate Brown could pick from when filling the Supreme Court vacancy.

In 2022, Ortega faced an opponent in the primary election for the first time.

== See also ==
- List of Hispanic and Latino American jurists
- List of first women lawyers and judges in Oregon
