= Carpenter Creek, Montana =

Ghost town in Montana, United States

Coordinates: 46°33′00″N 107°58′22″W

Carpenter Creek, Montana is a ghost town in Musselshell County. It was the site of a Post Office from 1915 to 1918, with John Donovan as postmaster. The site of a former large coal mine, Carpenter Creek is the birthplace of J. R. "Doc" Campbell, the 82nd Associate Justice of the Oregon Supreme Court.
