= Adrienne Nelson =

American judge (born 1967)

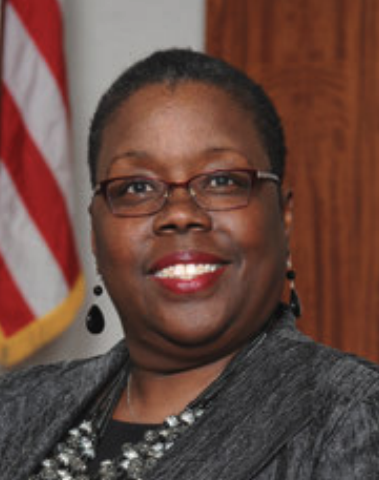

Judge of the United States District Court for the District of Oregon
- Incumbent
- Assumed office February 23, 2023
- Appointed by: Joe Biden
- Preceded by: Michael W. Mosman

Justice of the Oregon Supreme Court
- In office January 2, 2018 – February 23, 2023
- Appointed by: Kate Brown
- Preceded by: Jack Landau
- Succeeded by: Aruna Masih

Personal details
- Born: Adrienne Camille Nelson; 1967 (age 58–59) Kansas City, Missouri, U.S.
- Education: University of Arkansas (BA); University of Texas at Austin (JD)

Adrienne Camille Nelson (born 1967) is an American lawyer and jurist serving as a United States district judge of the United States District Court for the District of Oregon since 2023. She previously served as a justice of the Oregon Supreme Court from 2018 to 2023 and as a judge on the Multnomah County Circuit Court from 2006 to 2018.

== Early life and education ==
Nelson was born in Kansas City, Missouri, in 1967, and grew up in southwestern Arkansas. She graduated from Gurdon High School in Gurdon, Arkansas, in 1985. Nelson's mother, a former guidance counselor, successfully sued her school district to allow Nelson to be valedictorian after her high school initially named a white student with a lower GPA to be valedictorian instead.

Nelson graduated from the University of Arkansas in 1990 with a Bachelor of Arts, summa cum laude, in English literature and criminal justice. At the University of Arkansas, Nelson served as president of Phi Beta Kappa, tutored student athletes, sang in the gospel choir, and was a member of Alpha Kappa Alpha sorority.

As a single mother, Nelson attended and graduated from the University of Texas School of Law, where she earned a Juris Doctor in 1993.

== Legal career ==
Nelson moved to Portland, Oregon, in 1993, to be closer to her mother, who had previously relocated to the state. Nelson was a contract analyst for an insurance company for two years. She then worked as an attorney in private practice in Portland as a public defender, with Multnomah Defenders Inc, a non-profit public interest law firm, from 1996 to 1999, and for the law firm Bennett, Hartman, Morris & Kaplan LLP from 1999 to 2004. Nelson was a senior attorney in Student Legal and Mediation Services for Portland State University from 2004 to 2006. Nelson served as an adjunct professor at Lewis & Clark Law School from 2002 to 2005.

Nelson has been a member of the American Bar Association House of Delegates and the ABA Commission on Disability Rights. She received the Oregon Women Lawyers (OWLs) Judge Mercedes Deiz Award in 2003, and the Oregon State Bar President's Public Service Award in 2007. She has also served as president of the Multnomah Bar Foundation and president of the Oregon State Bar Foundation Board.

In 2021, a school in Happy Valley, Oregon was named after Nelson.

== Judicial service ==
=== Oregon circuit court ===
Governor Ted Kulongoski appointed Nelson as a judge on the Multnomah County Circuit Court in February 2006, to replace Sidney Galton. She was re-elected to a new six-year term in 2012.

=== Oregon Supreme Court ===
Governor Kate Brown appointed Nelson to the Oregon Supreme Court in January 2018, to replace justice Jack Landau, who retired on December 31, 2017. Nelson's term on the Supreme Court ended in January 2019, but she was elected to a full six year term in November 2018.

Nelson is the first African-American to serve on the Oregon Supreme Court, or on any state appellate court in Oregon.

=== United States district court ===
On July 14, 2022, President Joe Biden nominated Nelson to serve as a United States district judge of the United States District Court for the District of Oregon. President Biden nominated Nelson to the seat vacated by Judge Michael W. Mosman, who assumed senior status on December 27, 2021. On October 12, 2022, a hearing on her nomination was held before the Senate Judiciary Committee. On December 1, 2022, her nomination was reported out of committee by a 12–10 vote. On January 3, 2023, her nomination was returned to the President under Rule XXXI, Paragraph 6 of the United States Senate; she was renominated later the same day. On February 2, 2023, her nomination was reported out of committee by an 11–9 vote. On February 14, 2023, the Senate invoked cloture on her nomination by a 53–44 vote. On February 15, 2023, she was confirmed by a 52–46 vote. She received her judicial commission on February 23, 2023. She is the first African-American woman to serve on the United States District Court for the District of Oregon.

=== Notable cases ===
On December 10, 2024, Nelson issued an injunction blocking a merger between Kroger and Albertsons. The FTC sought to block the merger as a violation of antitrust law, arguing that a merger between the two companies would stifle competition.

== See also ==
- List of African-American federal judges
- List of African-American jurists
- List of Oregon judges

Legal offices
Preceded by Jack Landau	Justice of the Oregon Supreme Court; 2018–2023	Succeeded by Aruna Masih
Preceded by Michael W. Mosman	Judge of the United States District Court for the District of Oregon; 2023–present	Incumbent
