= Banks High School =

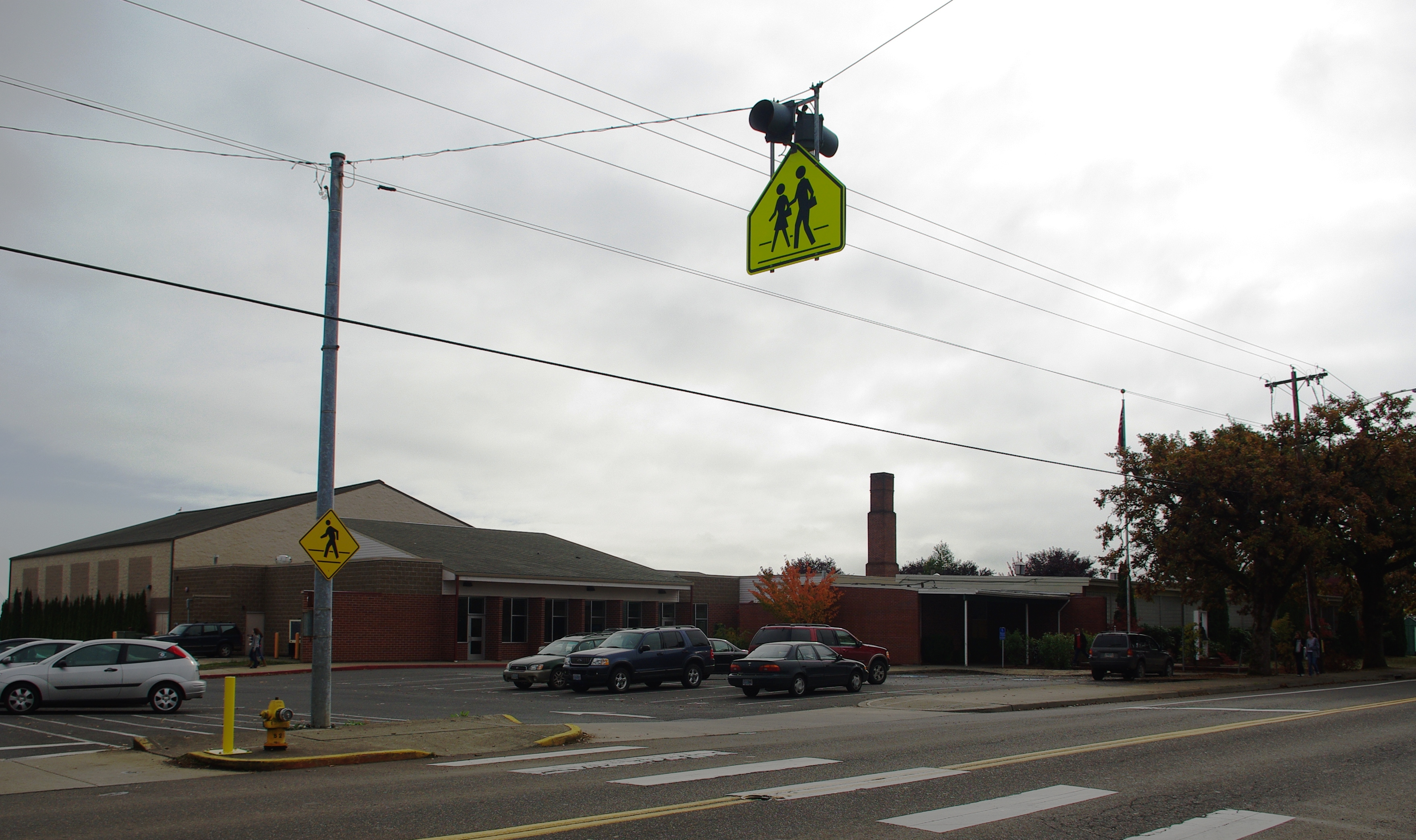

Location
- Banks, (Washington County), Oregon 97106; United States; 45.61518°N 123.113056°W

Information
- Type: Public
- School district: Banks School District
- Principal: Jacob Pence
- Teaching staff: 19.45 (FTE)
- Grades: 9-12
- Enrollment: 397 (2024-2025)
- Student to teacher ratio: 20.41
- Campus: Rural
- Colors: Navy, Vegas Gold, and White
- Athletics conference: OSAA 3A-2 Coastal Range League
- Mascot: Brave
- Team name: Braves
- Rival: Corbett High School, Valley Catholic High School, and Tillamook High School
- Website: Banks HS website

Banks High School is a Public High School in Banks, Oregon,

== History ==
During the Great Depression, the Works Progress Administration paid for work on the school's athletic fields. The project was completed in 1936.

== Academics ==
In 2008, 86% of the school's seniors received a high school diploma. Of 102 students, 88 graduated, ten dropped out, and four were still in high school the following year.

In 2022, 82% of the school's seniors received a high school diploma. Of 94 students, 80 graduated, and 15 students either dropped out, received a modified diploma or were still in high school the following year.

== Athletics ==
Banks High School athletic teams compete in the OSAA 3A-2 Coastal Range League (excluding Football which competes in 3A-SD1 and Boys Soccer which compete in 4A-1 Cowapa League). The athletic director is Ben Buchanan and the athletics secretary is Tammy Hilger.

State Championships:

- Baseball: 2019, 2023
- Boys Basketball: 2019
- Boys Golf: 2022
- Dance/Drill: 1989, 1990, 1992, 1997, 1998, 2002
- Football: 2018
- Girls Basketball: 2023
- Softball: 1999, 2012, 2013, 2016
- Volleyball: 2015

== Notable alumni ==
- Darleen Ortega, judge
- Kimberley Strassel, writer
