= Jack Landau (judge) =

American judge

Jack L. Landau

100th Justice of the Oregon Supreme Court
- In office January 3, 2011 – December 31, 2017
- Preceded by: W. Michael Gillette
- Succeeded by: Adrienne Nelson

Judge of the Oregon Court of Appeals
- In office 1993–2011
- Appointed by: Barbara Roberts
- Preceded by: George M. Joseph
- Succeeded by: Lynn Nakamoto

Personal details
- Born: 1953 (age 72–73) Colorado
- Education: Lewis & Clark College (BA, JD); University of Virginia (LLM)

Jack L. Landau (born 1953) is an American attorney and judge in the state of Oregon. A native of Colorado, he worked in private legal practice in Oregon before he joined the Oregon Department of Justice. He served on the Oregon Court of Appeals from 1993 to 2011, and on the Oregon Supreme Court from 2011 to 2017.

== Early life and education ==
Jack Landau was born in 1953 in Colorado. His family moved several times while he was growing up, and he attended high school first in Gibbsboro, New Jersey, at Eastern Regional High School from 1967 to 1968 followed by Benjamin Franklin High School in Los Angeles, California, for the next school year. In 1969, Landau's family settled in Portland, Oregon, where he attended another Benjamin Franklin High School, graduating in 1971.

Following high school, he remained in Portland and attended Lewis & Clark College where he graduated magna cum laude with a Bachelor of Arts degree in 1975. Landau then enrolled at the school's law school, Northwestern School of Law (now Lewis & Clark Law School), and he graduated in 1980 with a juris doctor. He later earned a Master of Laws (LL.M.) degree in judicial process from the University of Virginia School of Law in 2001.

== Career ==
Landau began his legal career as an instructor at his former law school from June 1980 until August 1981. He then worked as a clerk for judge Robert C. Belloni of the United States District Court for the District of Oregon in Portland from 1981 until 1983. He passed the Oregon bar in 1982, and then entered private legal practice at Lindsay, Hart, Neil & Weigler in Portland. Landau remained with the firm from 1983 until 1989, and rose to partner. In 1989, he joined the Oregon Department of Justice and worked there until 1993, rising to the position of deputy attorney general.

Oregon Governor Barbara Roberts appointed Landau to the Oregon Court of Appeals on December 15, 1992, to replace George M. Joseph. Landau served as judge on that court from 1993 until 2010, winning re-election to six-year terms in 1994, 2000, and 2006. Beginning in 1993, he also started teaching legislation as an adjunct professor at Willamette University College of Law. In January 2010, Landau entered the race to replace W. Michael Gillette as a justice of the Oregon Supreme Court. He faced administrative law judge Allan Arlow in the May primary, and Landau defeated him with 72% of the vote to win the seat on Oregon's highest court. Landau took office on January 3, 2011, as the one-hundredth person to serve on the court since it was formed when the Oregon Territory was organized.

Landau announced in September 2017 that he would retire from the Oregon Supreme Court in December 2017. Governor Kate Brown appointed Adrienne Nelson to replace Landau in January 2018.

Legal offices
Preceded by W. Michael Gillette	Justice of the Oregon Supreme Court; 2011–2017	Succeeded by Adrienne Nelson
