= Edward H. Howell =

American judge

76th Justice of the Oregon Supreme Court
- In office 1970–1980
- Appointed by: Tom McCall
- Preceded by: William C. Perry
- Succeeded by: J. R. Campbell

Judge of the Oregon Tax Court
- In office 1965–1970
- Appointed by: Mark Hatfield
- Preceded by: Peter M. Gunnar
- Succeeded by: Carlisle B. Roberts

Personal details
- Born: January 1, 1915 Portland, Oregon, U.S.
- Died: March 29, 1994 (aged 79) Salem, Oregon, U.S.
- Spouse: Jane Howell

Edward H. Howell (January 1, 1915 – March 29, 1994) was an American jurist in the state of Oregon. The Oregon native and Army veteran served on the Oregon Tax Court and the Oregon Supreme Court.

== Early life ==
Edward Howell was born in Portland, Oregon, on January 1, 1915. The family later moved to The Dalles, Oregon, where Edward graduated from The Dalles High School. He then went to college, followed by law school. Howell graduated in 1940 from Willamette University College of Law in Salem, Oregon. Then with the onset of World War II he joined the United States Army where he served as an intelligence officer in the Aleutian Islands. He married Jane Howell and they had three daughters.

== Judicial career ==
In 1949, Howell began his judicial career when he was appointed to Oregon's 11th Judicial Career. On February 19, 1965, Howell was appointed by Governor Mark Hatfield to the Oregon Tax Court to replace Peter M. Gunnar who had resigned. He served on this single-judge court until resigning on May 31, 1970. On June 1, 1970, he was appointed to the Oregon Supreme Court by Governor Tom McCall to replace William C. Perry who had resigned from the bench. Howell was elected to a full six-year term later in 1970 and then re-elected in 1976. He resigned from the court on November 30, 1980.

Edward H. Howell died in Salem, Oregon, on March 29, 1994, of cancer and was buried at St. Peter Catholic Cemetery in The Dalles, Oregon.
