= Susan M. Leeson =

American judge

94th Justice of the Oregon Supreme Court
- In office 1998–2003
- Appointed by: John Kitzhaber
- Preceded by: Edward N. Fadeley
- Succeeded by: Rives Kistler

Judge of the Oregon Court of Appeals
- In office 1993–1998
- Appointed by: Barbara Roberts
- Preceded by: John H. Buttler
- Succeeded by: Robert D. Wollheim

Personal details
- Born: August 16, 1946 (age 79) Salt Lake City, Utah
- Spouse(s): Richard S. Hall, Jr.

Susan M. Leeson (born August 16, 1946) is an American attorney and former judge in the state of Oregon. She was the 94th justice of the Oregon Supreme Court. Prior to her appointment to the supreme court, the Utah native served on the Oregon Court of Appeals from 1993 to 1998.

== Early life ==
Susan Leeson was born on August 16, 1946, in Salt Lake City, Utah. The family moved to Oregon in 1961 where she attended Sunset High School near Beaverton. There she was a delegate to the Girls' Nation conference before graduating in 1964. In 1968, Leeson graduated from Willamette University in Salem, Oregon, with a bachelor of arts in political science. She graduated magna cum laude and then earned a master's degree and PhD from Claremont Graduate University. Then at the age of 24 she returned to Willamette and began teaching political science. While teaching, she enrolled at Willamette's law school and earned her Juris Doctor in 1981. After law school she clerked for Judge Alfred T. Goodwin and was a judicial fellow for U.S. Supreme Court Chief Justice Warren E. Burger's office.

Leeson was on the Willamette faculty for a total of more than 20 years at both the school's College of Liberal Arts and the law school. She helped to start the law school's alternative dispute resolution program in 1984. She also married fellow professor Richard S. Hall, Jr.

== Judicial career ==
In December 1992, Leeson was appointed to the Oregon Court of Appeals. She then won election to a full term in 1994.

On February 26, 1998, Governor John Kitzhaber appointed Leeson to the Oregon Supreme Court to replace Edward N. Fadeley. Leeson won election to a full six-year term later in 1998. She resigned in 2003 to battle breast cancer.

== Later life ==
After beating breast cancer, Leeson became a mediator and arbitrator. For several years, she has been listed in the "Best Lawyers in America" in the field of mediation and arbitration. Leeson received the Betty Roberts Award from Oregon Women Lawyers in 2003, and she was named Legal Citizen of the Year in 2006. She was an adjunct professor at the University of Oregon School of Law for two years, teaching mediation skills, and was the lead principal writer for the 2009 edition of "We the People: The Citizen and the Constitution" for the Center for Civic Education. Leeson frequently presents at teacher workshops around the country focused on civics and American history.

In 2009, Leeson became the staff mediator at the Oregon Federal District Court in Portland, Oregon. She received the Honorable James M. Burns Federal Practice Award that year. In 2012, she won the Robert F. Peckham Award for Excellence in ADR from the Ninth Circuit, and in 2013 the Sid Lezak Award of excellence from the ADR section of the Oregon State Bar.
