= W. Michael Gillette =

American judge

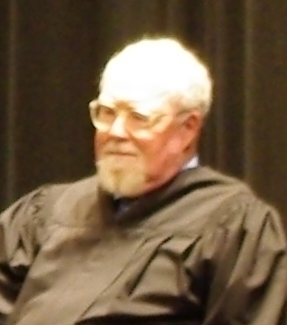
- Gillette in 2009

86th Justice of the Oregon Supreme Court
- In office 1986 – December 31, 2010
- Appointed by: Victor G. Atiyeh
- Preceded by: Betty Roberts
- Succeeded by: Jack L. Landau

Judge on the Oregon Court of Appeals
- In office 1977–1986
- Appointed by: Robert W. Straub
- Preceded by: new position
- Succeeded by: Mary J. Deits

Personal details
- Born: December 29, 1941 (age 84) Seattle, Washington, U.S.

W. Michael Gillette (born December 29, 1941) is an American attorney and retired judge in the state of Oregon. He was a justice of the Oregon Supreme Court, where he served from 1986 until 2010. A graduate of Harvard Law School, he was previously a judge on the Oregon Court of Appeals from 1977 to 1986.

== Early life ==
Gillette was born on December 29, 1941, in Seattle, Washington, and grew up in the Eastern Oregon city of Milton-Freewater. In 1963, Gillette graduated cum laude with a bachelor's degree in arts from Whitman College in Walla Walla, Washington. He then went on to Harvard Law School where he graduated with a bachelor of law degree in 1966.

== Legal career ==
Gillette passed the Oregon State Bar in 1966 and joined the Portland, Oregon law firm of Rives and Rogers. The next year he moved on to become a Deputy District Attorney for Multnomah County, staying until 1969. Following this he was an Assistant Attorney General in American Samoa and Oregon for two years. Gillette joined the Consumer Protection Division as chief counsel, serving until 1973 when he became Chief Trial Counsel for the Oregon Department of Justice. That same year he then became Solicitor General for the state of Oregon, a position he held until 1977.

In 1977, Gillette joined the Oregon Court of Appeals and served on that court until 1986. He served as a presiding judge on that court from 1980 until the end of his tenure. In 1980, he began serving on the board of directors for the Oregon Law-Related Education Project, remaining until 1988. Gillette left the Court of Appeals after appointment to the Oregon Supreme Court in 1986 by then Republican Governor Vic Atiyeh. Atiyeh appointed Gillette to fill the vacancy created when Justice Betty Roberts left the bench.

Gillette was then elected to a full six-year term in 1986 and re-elected in 1992, 1998, and 2004. Gillette is a faculty member of National Judicial College. On the bench he has authored many opinions, and was one of the leading opinion writers in the 1990s on the court. Gillette wrote the majority opinion in Lehman v. Bradbury that invalidated 1992's Measure 3 that had enacted term limits in Oregon, and the majority decision in Li & Kennedy vs. State of Oregon that invalidated same-sex marriages approved by Multnomah County in 2004. He also wrote the opinion of the unanimous court for the 2008 edition of Williams v. Philip Morris, Inc., a case that had already been to the United States Supreme Court twice. The opinion upheld the punitive damages award against the tobacco company. He declined to run for re-election in 2010 and his term ended on December 31, 2010.

== Later years ==
In the past he served as a faculty member of Willamette University, and as an instructor at Portland State University. Gillette served on the Board of Trustees from 1977 to 1980 for the Oregon Museum of Science and Industry. He worked on the Advisory Committee of Scholars for the Constitution Project starting in 1984, and in 1991 was named Classroom Law Project's Legal Citizen of the Year. The following year Gillette received an honorary LL.D. degree from Whitman College. In 2006, he was awarded the V. Robert Payant Award in 2006 for teaching excellence from the National Judicial College, and named one of the 500 Leading Judges in America in 2006 by Lawdragon. A basketball player in high school, he serves as a referee for high school games when away from court. The Wilsonville resident returned to private practice after leaving the bench, joining Portland law firm of Schwabe, Williamson & Wyatt in January 2011.
