= Aruna Masih =

American judge (born 1971)

Justice of the Oregon Supreme Court
- Incumbent
- Assumed office September 1, 2023
- Appointed by: Tina Kotek
- Preceded by: Adrienne Nelson

Personal details
- Born: July 9, 1971 (age 55) New York, U.S.
- Education: Wellesley College (BA); Creighton University (JD)

Aruna Anne Masih (born July 9, 1971) is an American labor lawyer from Oregon who has served as a justice of the Oregon Supreme Court since 2023.

== Education ==
Masih was born in New York to a Punjabi father and a British mother, both of whom were medical missionaries. She and her siblings attended Woodstock School. She attended Wellesley College, where she received a Bachelor of Arts, cum laude in international relations and French in 1994 and a Juris Doctor from the Creighton University School of Law in 1997.

== Career ==
Throughout her 25-year legal career, Masih was with the firm McKanna Bishop Joffe in Portland and prior to her appointment to the bench, she was partner in the law firm of Bennett Hartman. Her legal expertise centered around the Oregon Public Employees Retirement System and pension case law.

=== Appointment to Oregon Supreme Court ===
On August 16, 2023, Governor Tina Kotek announced her appointment of Masih to the Oregon Supreme Court to fill the vacancy left by the appointment of Adrienne Nelson to the United States District Court for the District of Oregon. She was sworn into office on September 1, 2023. She is the first Indian American, South Asian American and Punjabi to serve on the court.

== Personal life ==
Masih is married to a public defender in Multnomah County. She attends Calvary Presbyterian Church in Portland, Oregon.

Legal offices
Preceded by Adrienne Nelson	Justice of the Oregon Supreme Court; 2023–present	Incumbent
