= Jason Lee (judge) =

American judge

Jason Dwight Lee
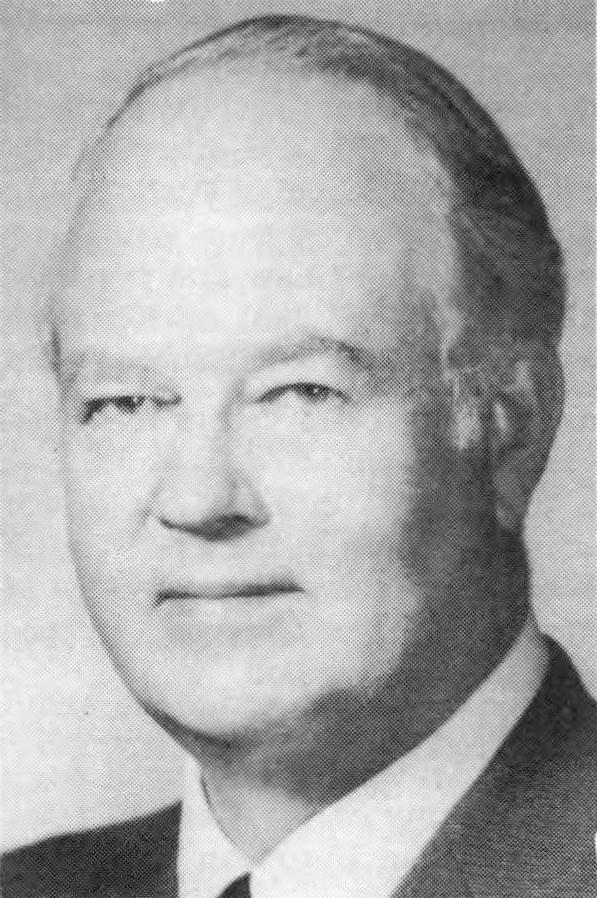

Judge on the Oregon Court of Appeals
- In office 1975–1980
- Preceded by: Jacob Tanzer
- Succeeded by: John C. Warden

Personal details
- Born: June 2, 1915
- Died: February 19, 1980 (aged 64) Salem, Oregon
- Party: Democratic
- Spouse: Dorothy B. Lee
- Occupation: Attorney, jurist

Jason Dwight Lee (June 2, 1915 – February 19, 1980) was an American politician and judge in the state of Oregon. A controversial lawyer, he served on the Oregon Court of Appeals and made an unsuccessful attempt at joining the Oregon Supreme Court and was the defendant in several cases that made their way to the state's highest court. His attorney records were the subject of a lawsuit that opened lawyer discipline records up for public scrutiny.

== Early life ==
Lee was born on June 2, 1915, the son of Myrtle Lee. He was not related to the Jason Lee of the Methodist Mission from Oregon's pioneer history. He married Dorothy B. Lee, and the two were divorced on July 17, 1969, with the couple having three children while married including Vena Patricia, Elizabeth Anne and David. The family resided in Salem, Oregon, where Lee was an attorney.

== Political career ==
A Democrat, Lee ran for Congress in 1956 to represent Oregon first congressional district. He won the Democratic Primary, but lost to incumbent A. Walter Norblad by a 54.8% to 45.2% margin. In 1965, he was admonished for ethics violations and narrowly avoided being suspended from practicing law for one year.

In 1974, he won a primary election over incumbent judge Jacob Tanzer for a seat on the Oregon Court of Appeals. As of 2004, this was the last time an incumbent appellate judge in Oregon lost an election. Tanzer's campaign committee then sued claiming Lee had lied to voters in campaign statements in violation of Oregon's election laws. Lee lost the jury trial, but the Oregon Supreme Court reversed the decision and ordered the Secretary of State to put him back on the fall ballot. He won the election as the only person on the ballot, defeating Tanzer who waged a write-in campaign. Tanzer won election to the court in 1976, and the two served on the court together until January 1980 when Tanzer was elevated to the Oregon Supreme Court.

== Oregon Supreme Court ==
Jason Lee filed to run for an open seat on the Supreme Court in 1975. This led reporter Russell Sadler to request Lee's disciplinary records from the Oregon State Bar (OSB). The OSB refused, even after the Oregon Attorney General ordered the agency to release the files under Oregon's public records disclosure law. Sadler then sued OSB, with a jury finding in the OSB's favor, but the Oregon Supreme Court overturned the decision and ordered the release of the records in June 1976. Once released, the files contained many complaints, a letter of reprimand for improperly contacting a judge, and weighed a total of 15 pounds.

Meanwhile, in March 1976, Lee lost another decision in the Supreme Court with the court ruling he had misappropriated funds from his daughter's trust fund. He then withdrew from the race for the Oregon Supreme Court. On February 19, 1980, Jason Lee died in office at the age of 64.
