= Ralph M. Holman =

American judge

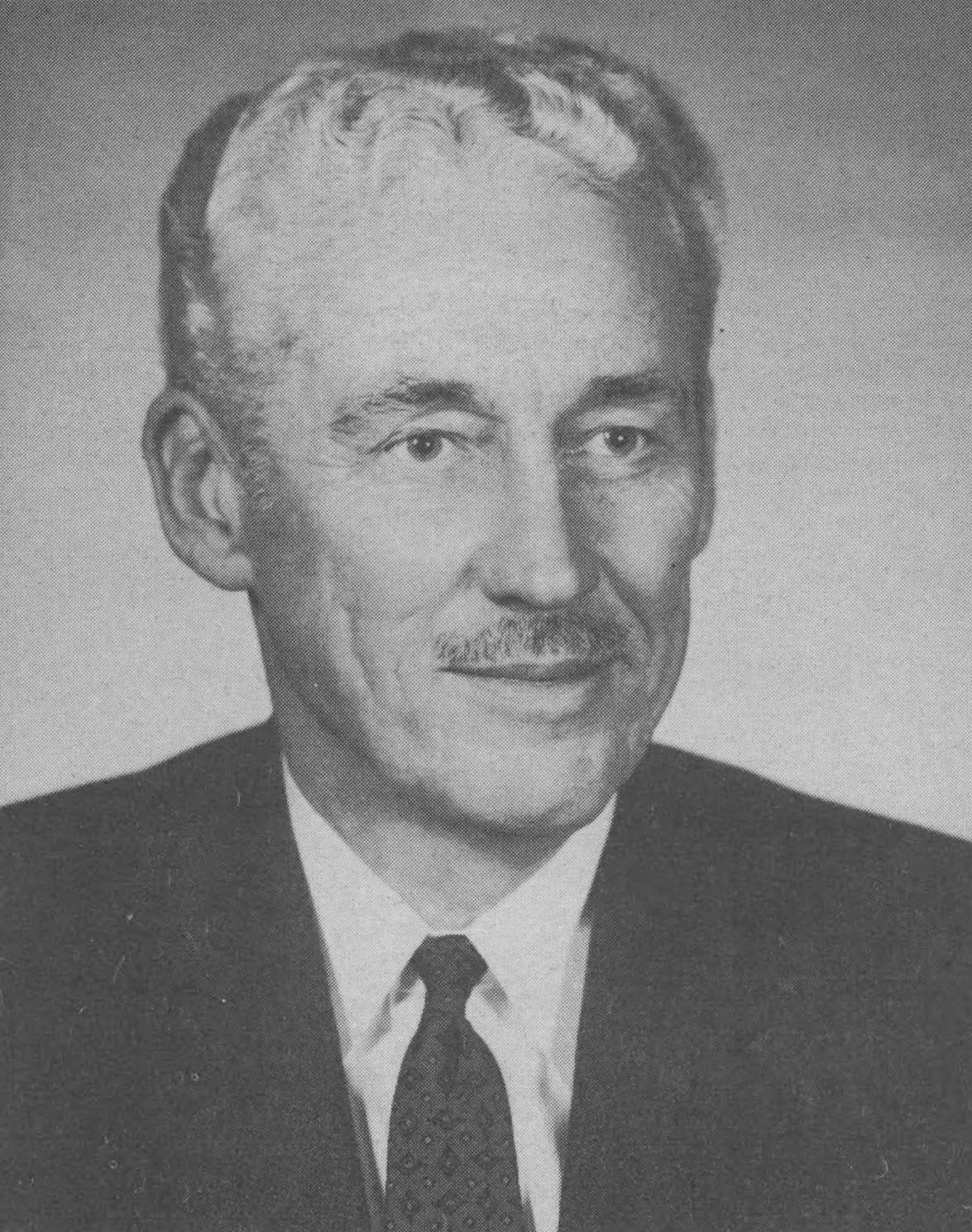

74th Justice of the Oregon Supreme Court
- In office 1965–1980
- Preceded by: George Rossman
- Succeeded by: Jacob Tanzer

Personal details
- Born: June 7, 1914 Portland, Oregon
- Died: September 3, 2013 (aged 99) Salem, Oregon
- Spouse: Louise Oesch Holman

Ralph Milo Holman (June 7, 1914 – September 3, 2013) was an attorney and judge in the state of Oregon, United States. He was the 74th justice of the Oregon Supreme Court. Previously he was a circuit court judge for Clackamas County, Oregon. His great uncle was United States Senator Rufus C. Holman.

== Early life ==
A fourth generation Oregonian, Ralph Holman was born on June 7, 1914, in Portland, Oregon, but grew up in Molalla, Oregon, southeast of Portland. There he attended elementary school and graduated in 1932 from Molalla High School (from which eight Holmans have graduated). During the Great Depression, he worked as a clerk during the daytime, posting relief checks. At night, he attended the Northwestern College of Law (now Lewis & Clark Law School) in Portland, Oregon. In 1937, he graduated from law school with a Juris Doctor, and passed the bar that year. Holman began practicing law in Oregon City, Oregon, with the firm Butler, Jack, Beckett and Holman, before joining the United States Navy during World War II. He served from 1942 to 1946, when he was discharged as a Chief Petty Officer. During this time, he lost his lower left leg in a forklift accident.

== Judicial career ==
After World War II, Holman returned to Oregon, where he was appointed to the Clackamas County Circuit Court by Governor Douglas McKay in 1950. He served as a circuit court judge for 15 years, until 1965. While on the bench in that court, he served on the Committee on the Administration of Justice created by the Oregon Legislature, and was chairman of the subcommittee on Juvenile Law. Through his efforts on this committee, the legislature passed a law which allowed for abusive parents to lose their parental rights, thereby enabling abused children to become adopted. Holman's 1960 decision in Dickman v. School District No. 62C, a case that allowed the use of public funds for purchasing textbooks for parochial schools, spurred an appeals process that ultimately led to the United States Supreme Court. His decision was overturned by the Oregon Supreme Court, which argued the "child benefit" theory could not be used to justify public expenditures for private causes. The United States Supreme Court left this decision intact when they denied certiorari.

In 1964, Holman was elected to the Oregon Supreme Court, the state's highest court, filling the position of George Rossman whose term had expired. During the summer of 1967, Holman was a judge in residence at New York University School of Law, a fellowship for appellate judges that was awarded by the Institute of Judicial Administration. At the request of his fellow justices, Holman created the plan to establish the Oregon Court of Appeals, which was approved by the State Bar Association and Oregon Legislature in 1969. Holman won re-election to additional six-year terms in 1970 and 1976. His opinion in Portland Section of Council of Jewish Women vs. Sisters of Charity (1973) is often cited as an example of impracticability in contract law. Before the end of his final term, he submitted his resignation to Governor Victor Atiyeh on October 16, 1979, citing his advancing age. His resignation became effective January 20, 1980, after 30 years on the Oregon bench.

== Later life and family ==
In 1937, he married Louise Mariam Oesch, who died in 1989. They did not have any children. Holman was a Life Trustee at Lewis & Clark College, which honored him with the Aubrey Watzik award, and the distinguished graduate award from Lewis & Clark Law School. For many years, he served as the Chairman of the Law School budget committee. Until the end of his life, Holman served as a senior judge for the state of Oregon, in which the chief justice of the Oregon Supreme Court is allowed to appoint retired justices on a temporary needed basis. In 2005, at the age of 91, Holman and other family members created the Holman Family Scholarship for graduates of Molalla High School. Clackamas County Courthouse opened the Ralph M. Holman Law Center in 2007, its first expansion in 71 years, which houses offices for drug and DUII court, court reporters, jury assembly rooms, and the Alden Miller Law Library. Holman was an avid fly fisherman, which led him to travel extensively throughout South America, Asia, and the Pacific Northwest. He and his wife were passionate collectors of art and antiques, and cultivated roses. Holman died at his home in Salem, Oregon, on September 3, 2013, at the age of 99.
