= Jacob Tanzer =

American judge

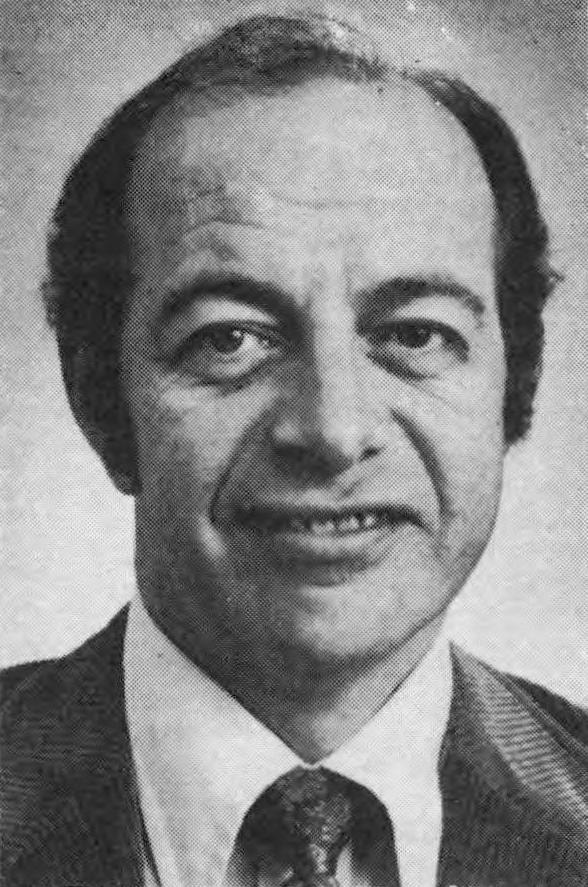

81st Justice of the Oregon Supreme Court
- In office 1980–1982
- Appointed by: Victor G. Atiyeh
- Preceded by: Ralph M. Holman
- Succeeded by: Robert E. Jones

Judge of the Oregon Court of Appeals
- In office 1976–1980
- Appointed by: Robert W. Straub
- Preceded by: Robert H. Foley
- Succeeded by: John C. Warden
- In office 1973–1975
- Appointed by: Tom McCall
- Preceded by: new position
- Succeeded by: Jason Lee

Personal details
- Born: February 13, 1935 Longview, Washington, U.S.
- Died: July 23, 2018 (aged 83) Portland, Oregon, U.S.
- Spouse: Elaine

Jacob B. Tanzer (February 13, 1935 – July 23, 2018) was an American attorney in the state of Oregon. Prior to private practice Tanzer served as the 81st justice of the Oregon Supreme Court. He also served on the Oregon Court of Appeals, was a deputy district attorney for Multnomah County, Oregon, and worked for the United States Department of Justice.

== Early life ==
Jacob Tanzer was born in Longview, Washington on February 13, 1935 to a Jewish family. Tanzer was raised in Portland, Oregon, where he attended Grant High School. After high school he attended the University of Oregon in Eugene where he earned a Bachelor of Arts in 1956. Tanzer then went on to the university's law school, graduating in 1959 with his Juris Doctor. That year he passed the Oregon bar. He also attended Stanford University in California and Reed College in Portland, Oregon.

== Legal career ==
From 1959 until 1962 Tanzer worked in private legal practice in Portland. Tanzer then joined the U.S. Department of Justice in 1962, where he would remain until 1964. In 1964, while working for the Department of Justice he was sent to Mississippi as part of the Civil Rights Division to investigate the murders of Chaney, Goodman, and Schwerner, three civil rights activists. The incident would later become the basis for the movie Mississippi Burning (1988).

From 1965 until 1969 Jacob Tanzer worked as a deputy district attorney for Multnomah County, Oregon, the county where Portland is located. In 1969 he became Oregon's first Solicitor General in the Oregon Department of Justice, serving until 1971 when he became the first director of the Oregon Department of Human Services. While Solicitor General he defended the state's position in the U.S. Supreme Court case of Apodaca v. Oregon. Tanzer remained at that agency until 1973.

=== Judicial career ===
On October 5, 1973, Jacob Tanzer was appointed by Oregon Governor Tom McCall to a new position on the Oregon Court of Appeals. That term ended on January 6, 1975. The following year he ran for a position on the court, but was appointed to the court before the election was held by Governor Robert W. Straub on August 16, 1976. He was replacing Robert H. Foley who had resigned, and Tanzer won election to a full six-year term on the court that year before resigning on January 21, 1980.

On that same day, Tanzer was appointed by Governor Victor G. Atiyeh to the Oregon Supreme Court to replace Ralph M. Holman who had resigned. Tanzer won election to a full six-year term later in 1980, and then resigned from the court on December 31, 1982.

== Later years ==
After retiring from the bench, Tanzer returned to private practice in Portland. He died in Portland on July 23, 2018, due to a fall.

== See also ==
- List of Jewish American jurists
