= Bronson James =

American judge (born 1971 or 1972)

Justice of the Oregon Supreme Court
- Incumbent
- Assumed office January 1, 2023
- Appointed by: Kate Brown
- Preceded by: Martha Lee Walters

Personal details
- Born: 1972 (age 52–53)
- Education: Reed College (BA); Lewis and Clark College (JD)

Bronson James (born 1972) is an American lawyer serving as a justice of the Oregon Supreme Court. He assumed office on January 1, 2023.

== Education ==
James earned a Bachelor of Arts degree from Reed College in 1994 and a Juris Doctor from the Lewis & Clark Law School in 2003.

== Career ==
James was nominated to the Oregon Court of Appeals in 2017. He previously served as a public defender in the Oregon Office of Public Defense Services. In 2014, James authored an amicus brief on behalf of National Association of Criminal Defense Lawyers in Riley v. California. In December 2022, James was appointed to the Oregon Supreme Court by outgoing governor Kate Brown. He was sworn into office by Chief Justice Meagan Flynn on January 1, 2023.

== Electoral history ==
2018 Judge of the Oregon Court of Appeals, Position 2
Party	Candidate	Votes	%
Nonpartisan	Bronson D James	992,125	98.2
Write-in		17,957	1.8
Total votes		1,010,082	100%

2024 Judge of the Oregon Supreme Court, Position 7
Party	Candidate	Votes	%
Nonpartisan	Bronson D James	1,212,011	98.1
Write-in		23,702	1.9
Total votes		1,235,713	100%

Legal offices
Preceded by Martha Lee Walters	Justice of the Oregon Supreme Court; 2023–present	Incumbent
