= University of Oregon School of Law =

Public law school in Eugene, Oregon, US

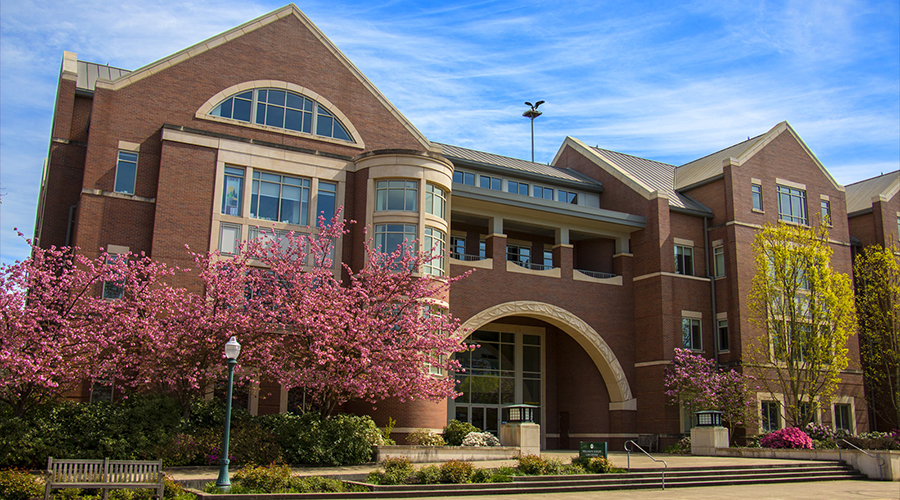
- Motto: Mens agitat molem (Latin) Minds Move Mountains
- Parent school: University of Oregon
- Established: 1884
- School type: Public
- Parent endowment: US $ 822 million
- Dean: Jennifer Reynolds
- Location: Eugene, Oregon, United States; 44.04297°N 123.06929°W
- Enrollment: J.D. 457 students;
- Faculty: 37 full-time
- USNWR ranking: 91st (2026)
- Bar pass rate: 90%
- Website: law.uoregon.edu
- ABA profile: University of Oregon School of Law Profile

The University of Oregon School of Law is a public law school in the U.S. state of Oregon. Housed in the Knight Law Center, it is Oregon's only state funded law school. The school, founded in 1884 in Portland, Oregon, is located on the University of Oregon campus in Eugene, on the corner of 15th and Agate streets, overlooking Hayward Field.

== History ==
Oregon Law was founded in 1884 in Portland, Oregon. Richard R. Thornton organized the department that began as a two-year program with three classes per week. In 1906, the course of study was expanded to three years, and in April 1915, the school's board of regents ordered that the program be moved to Eugene as part of a consolidation program within the university. Though the school moved, some of the faculty remained in Portland and started the Northwest College of Law, now the Lewis & Clark Law School. In 1923, the school was approved by the American Bar Association (ABA), one of the first 39 schools to earn that distinction in the initial year of the ABA approval of law schools.

In 1931, Wayne Morse became dean. Three years later, the law school organized a chapter of the national law school honor society, the Order of the Coif. In 1938, the law school moved to Fenton Hall. In 1939, the law school graduated Minoru Yasui, who later took his challenge to the military curfew on Japanese Americans during World War II all the way to the United States Supreme Court.

In 1941, Orlando John Hollis became acting dean. His appointment became permanent in 1945 when Morse resigned to run for the U.S. Senate. During the years of World War II, many law students were called to service. In 1944, there were no graduating students; in 1945, only one student graduated. After the war's conclusion, the school admitted every returning veteran who sought a legal education: out of 26 students who graduated in 1948, 25 had served in World War II.

The post-war era was marked by the Oregon legislature's adoption of law professor Kenneth O'Connell's Oregon Revised Statutes. Professor O'Connell was appointed to the Oregon Supreme Court in 1958, and later became its chief justice.

During the 1960s, Professor (and later dean) Chapin Clark offered the school's first courses in environmental and natural resources law. Later that decade, Professor Jon Jacobson founded the school's Ocean and Coastal Law Center. In 1968, Eugene Scoles became dean.

In 1970, the law school moved into a new building, the Law Center. In 1974, the Wayne Morse Chair of Law and Politics was established as a "living memorial" to former dean and U.S. senator Wayne Morse. In 1977, Professor Hans A. Linde was appointed to the Oregon Supreme Court. In 1978, the school established the first-in-the-world Environmental Law Clinic.

During the 1980s, the Environmental Law Clinic doubled in size and was renamed the Pacific Northwest Natural Resources Clinic. In 1981, Professor Dave Frohnmayer became Oregon Attorney General. In 1982, students organized the first Public Interest Environmental Law Conference. In 1986, the Journal of Environmental Law and Litigation began publication.

In the new century, the school opened the Appropriate Dispute Resolution Program. In 2003, the Environmental and Natural Resources Law Program opened a fully staffed office. In 2004, the Center for Law and Entrepreneurship opened a Small Business Clinic to assist small and micro-businesses. The school also has started a program in Portland, which moved into Portland's White Stag Building in 2008. The Portland Program focuses on business law and related externships.

In March 2025, Jennifer Reynolds was named dean and Dave Frohnmayer Chair in Leadership and Law.

In July 2025, Oregon state legislators passed a bill to allocate $3.4 million to law schools in Oregon to fund criminal defense clinics. This funding will give law students the opportunity to work with and represent clients accused of misdemeanors.

== Rankings ==
In the 2026 national report of best law schools released by US News & World Report, the University of Oregon School of Law is the only law school in the Pacific Northwest to boast four top-ranked specialty law rankings and is ranked #91 among the 195 Best Law Schools.

- #1 Oregon Law’s Legal Research and Writing Program remained the top program in the country and is the only top-10 legal writing program in the Big Ten.
- #8 Oregon Law’s Environmental and Natural Resources Law Center which focuses on interdisciplinary research projects.
- #16 Oregon Law's ranking in Public Interest Jobs
- #11 Oregon Law’s Appropriate Dispute Resolution Center provides students with an education with emphasis on skillful management of disputes, deals, and decision-making.

Best programs: Oregon Law named top in the state of Oregon for business/corporate law, contracts/commercial law, criminal law, dispute resolution, legal writing, and tax law.

The program includes a master's of law degree (LL.M.) option.

== Programs ==
The University of Oregon School of Law is known for possessing the nation's first public law school to establish an environmental law program.

The law school also houses a prominent Appropriate Dispute Resolution Center, ranked 8th in the country in the 2026 U.S. News & World Report.

The law school's Legal Research and Writing (LRW) Program also is well regarded and has been top ranked for 21 years.

== Law publications ==
The School of Law is home to several legal journals.

- The Journal of Environmental Law and Litigation is a student-run law journal founded in 1986 and dedicated to the examination of environmental and natural resources law.
- The Oregon Law Review is the flagship law review of the University of Oregon School of Law. It was founded in 1921 and originally run by the school faculty. From 1925–1938 the Law Review served as the journal for the Oregon Bar Association. By 1967, the Law Review had been turned over to a student board of editors. Published on a biannual basis, it is the oldest continually published law journal in the Pacific Northwest.
- The Oregon Review of International Law is a student-run journal founded in 1999 and published continually since. It specializes in topics pertaining to international law and policy.

== Employment ==
More than 90% of Oregon Law's 2025 class is employed as of 10 months after graduation.

== Costs ==
The total cost of attendance (indicating the cost of tuition, fees, and living expenses) at Oregon for the 2026–2027 academic year was $85,200 for non-residents and $71,916 for Oregon residents.

== Public Interest Environmental Law Conference ==
The Public Interest Environmental Law Conference (PIELC) is a conference annually in March at the University of Oregon School of Law in Eugene, Oregon, United States. The conference is a gathering of environmental activists, advocates, and students from across the United States and the world.

PIELC is organized and hosted by the students involved in the environmental law society "Land Air Water" (LAW). Land Air Water is a student group at the University of Oregon School of Law. It is co-sponsored by Friends of Land Air Water, a University of Oregon/Land Air Water alumni group that helps advise the student organizers.

The conference has six to ten internationally recognized keynote addresses and over 120 panels. Notable keynoters include Ralph Nader, Winona LaDuke, and David Brower.

The conference has been held since 1983 and celebrated its 44th anniversary in 2026.

The content of the conference is aimed at professional environmental activists, such as people that work in non-profit public interest organizations such as the Wilderness Society, the Sierra Club, and the Oregon Natural Desert Association and public interest environmental attorneys like Earthjustice, Natural Resources Defense Council, and private public interest attorneys. CLE credits are available.

The conference is also of interest to students of environmental law and environmental studies, and each year it hosts groups from around a dozen different schools.

The conference is unapologetically pro-public interest and pro-environment. It is a forum for the people who are actively enforcing environmental law and promoting environmental values to share experiences, strategies, and news.

== Notable alumni ==
=== Judges ===
- Ann Aiken (1979) – Senior Judge, former Chief Judge, United States District Court for the District of Oregon
- Robert C. Belloni (1951) – former Judge, United States District Court for the District of Oregon
- William G. East (1932) – former Judge, United States District Court for the District of Oregon
- Helen J. Frye (1966) – former Judge, United States District Court for the District of Oregon
- Alfred Goodwin (1951) – Senior Judge, Ninth Circuit Court of Appeals
- Bert E. Haney (1903) – former Judge, Ninth Circuit Court of Appeals
- Malcolm F. Marsh (1954) – senior judge, United States District Court for the District of Oregon
- David Schuman (1984) – former judge, Oregon Court of Appeals; former associate dean and professor at the University of Oregon School of Law
- Mustafa T. Kasubhai (1996) – District Judge, United States District for the District of Oregon.

=== Justice ===
- Suzanne Bonamici (1983) – member, United States House of Representatives
- David V. Brewer (1977) – Associate Justice of the Oregon Supreme Court
- William A. Ekwall (1912) – former member, United States House of Representatives; former Judge, United States Customs Court
- Edward N. Fadeley (1957) – former Justice, Oregon Supreme Court; former president, Oregon State Senate
- Jack Faust (1958) – Portland First Citizen, former TV broadcaster
- John Frohnmayer (1972) – former chairman of the National Endowment for the Arts
- Arthur D. Hay (1911) – former Justice, Oregon Supreme Court
- Donald Hodel (1960) – former secretary of energy and Secretary of the Interior; former president, Christian Coalition; former president and CEO, Focus on the Family
- Earl C. Latourette (1912) – former chief justice, Oregon Supreme Court
- Edwin J. Peterson (1957) – former chief justice, Oregon Supreme Court
- R. William Riggs (1968) – former justice, Oregon Supreme Court
- Ellen Rosenblum (1975) – Oregon attorney general; former judge, Oregon Court of Appeals.
- Frederick Steiwer (1908) – former United States senator from Oregon
- Jacob Tanzer (1959) – former justice, Oregon Supreme Court
- Thomas Tongue (1937) – former justice, Oregon Supreme Court
- Richard Unis (1953) – former justice, Oregon Supreme Court
- Martha Lee Walters (1977) – justice, Oregon Supreme Court
- Harold Warner (1916) – former chief justice, Oregon Supreme Court
- Minoru Yasui (1939) – namesake for Yasui v. United States'

=== Government ===
- Yōsuke Matsuoka (1900) – Foreign Minister of Japan
- Wendell Wyatt (1941) – former member, United States House of Representatives
- Fred Risser (1952) – Wisconsin state senator and longest-serving state legislator in American history
- Hardy Myers (1964) – former Oregon attorney general
- Ron Wyden (1974) – United States senator from Oregon
- Raymond F. Rees, (1976) United States Army major general, acting Chief of the National Guard Bureau, Adjutant General of Oregon
- Julius L. Meier (1895) – former governor of Oregon
