= R. William Riggs =

American judge (1938–2022)

Richard William Riggs

94th Justice of the Oregon Supreme Court
- In office 1998–2006
- Appointed by: John Kitzhaber
- Preceded by: Susan P. Graber
- Succeeded by: Martha Lee Walters

Judge of the Oregon Court of Appeals
- In office 1988–1998
- Appointed by: Neil Goldschmidt
- Preceded by: George Van Hoomissen; John C. Warden
- Succeeded by: Rives Kistler

Personal details
- Born: November 21, 1938 Hinsdale, Illinois
- Died: April 23, 2022 (aged 83)
- Children: 2
- Education: Portland State University (BS); University of Oregon (JD)

Military service
- Branch/service: United States Navy
- Years of service: 1961–1992
- Rank: Captain

Richard William Riggs (November 21, 1938 – April 23, 2022) was an American attorney and jurist who served as the 94th justice of the Oregon Supreme Court from 1998 to 2006.

== Early life and education ==
He was born on November 21, 1938, in Hinsdale, Illinois, where he lived until 1950 when his family moved to Hillsboro, Oregon. In Oregon he graduated from Hillsboro High School. Riggs earned a Bachelor of Arts degree in history from Portland State University in 1961. He then served in the United States Navy Reserve from 1961 to 1992. Riggs retired from the Navy with the rank of captain and earned a Juris Doctor from the University of Oregon School of Law in 1968.

== Career ==
Riggs served as president of the Oregon Trial Lawyers Association from 1973 to 1974, and has been on the board of governors for the Western Trial Lawyers Association. He was a member of both Phi Alpha Delta and Sigma Alpha Epsilon. In 1993, he helped to found the Oregon Academy of Family Law Practitioners and has worked with the organization since its inception.

=== Judicial service ===
William Riggs became a circuit court judge for Multnomah County, Oregon in 1978, serving until 1988. From 1988 to 1998 he was a judge for the Oregon Court of Appeals. He was appointed to the Court of Appeals on October 24 of 1988 to replace George Van Hoomissen who had been elected to the Oregon Supreme Court. Riggs was then elected to the court later in 1988 to fill a position vacated by John C. Warden and then re-elected in 1994. He resigned from the appeals court in September 1998.

On September 8, 1998, Oregon Governor John Kitzhaber appointed Riggs as the ninety-fourth justice to the state supreme court. He replaced Susan P. Graber who had resigned in April. That fall Riggs won election to a full six-year term, and then re-election in 2004. While on the court he authored the majority opinion in State v. Guzek, regarding the penalty phase of death penalty trials that was then heard before the Supreme Court of the United States. He resigned from the court in September 2006 and Oregon Governor Ted Kulongoski appointed Martha Lee Walters to fill the position.

== Personal life ==
He lived in Wilsonville, Oregon, and had two children by his first marriage, Jeff and Laura. He was married three times. Riggs died on April 23, 2022, from a heart attack.
