= Robert E. Jones (judge) =

American judge (1927–2025)

Robert Edward Jones

Senior Judge of the United States District Court for the District of Oregon
- In office May 1, 2000 – March 29, 2025

Judge of the United States District Court for the District of Oregon
- In office April 30, 1990 – May 1, 2000
- Appointed by: George H. W. Bush
- Preceded by: James M. Burns
- Succeeded by: Michael W. Mosman

84th Justice of the Oregon Supreme Court
- In office 1983–1990
- Appointed by: Victor G. Atiyeh
- Preceded by: Jacob Tanzer
- Succeeded by: Susan P. Graber

Personal details
- Born: Robert Edward Jones; July 5, 1927 Portland, Oregon, U.S.
- Died: March 29, 2025 (aged 97)
- Spouse: Pearl Jensen (m. 1948; died 2023)
- Children: 2
- Education: University of Hawaiʻi (BA); Lewis & Clark College (LLB)

Robert Edward Jones (July 5, 1927 – March 29, 2025) was an American politician and judge in Oregon. He served as a United States district judge of the United States District Court for the District of Oregon in Portland. A Portland native, he previously served as the 84th justice of the Oregon Supreme Court and as a member of the Oregon House of Representatives.

== Background ==
Jones was born in Portland, Oregon, on July 5, 1927. There he attended Grant High School. After high school, Jones joined the United States Naval Reserve and attended the University of Hawaiʻi where he earned a Bachelor of Arts degree in 1949. He then enrolled at the Lewis & Clark Law School in Portland where he graduated in 1953 with a Bachelor of Laws. While in the Naval Reserve he served in the Judge Advocate General Corps from 1949 to 1987.

In 1948, Jones married Pearl Jensen; they lived in Lake Oswego, Oregon, and were married until her death in 2023. The couple had two children.

Jones died on March 29, 2025, at the age of 97.

== Legal career ==
After law school Jones entered private legal practice in Portland where he remained until 1963. In 1963, he entered politics when he served in the Oregon House of Representatives as a Republican representing Portland. He resigned, however, before the special session held later that year. Jones resigned in order to become a circuit judge in Multnomah County, where he remained until 1982.

== Judicial career ==
=== State judicial service ===
On December 16, 1982, Jones was appointed by Oregon Governor Victor G. Atiyeh to the Oregon Supreme Court. He replaced Jacob Tanzer who had resigned. One of the most notable cases Jones authored the opinion in was State v. Henry, which declared unconstitutional all Oregon obscenity laws then binding. Jones served on Oregon's highest court until April 30, 1990, when he resigned.

=== Federal judicial service ===
On February 20, 1990, Jones was nominated to become a United States District Judge of the United States District Court for the District of Oregon by President George H. W. Bush to replace Judge James M. Burns. He was confirmed by the United States Senate on April 27 and then received his federal commission on April 30, 1990. Jones took senior status on May 1, 2000. He continued to hear cases until 2022.

=== Notable cases ===
As a federal judge, he upheld Oregon's Assisted Suicide law against a federal challenge in April 2002. U.S. Attorney General John Ashcroft had challenged the law based on federal laws concerning controlled substances. In 2003, to 2004 he was the presiding judge of the case involving Mike Hawash of the Portland Seven in which Hawash received a seven-year sentence for conspiring to fight in Afghanistan for the Taliban against United States forces. Then in 2005, he ruled against the Bush administration in their efforts to reduce protection of gray wolves under the Endangered Species Act.

== Other service ==
Jones was a former president of the Oregon Trial Lawyers Association, an adjunct member of the Lewis & Clark Law School faculty, part of the National Judicial College, and a faculty member of the American Academy of Judicial Education.

Legal offices
Preceded by James M. Burns	Judge of the United States District Court for the District of Oregon; 1990–2000	Succeeded by Michael W. Mosman
