= Berkeley Lent =

American politician and judge

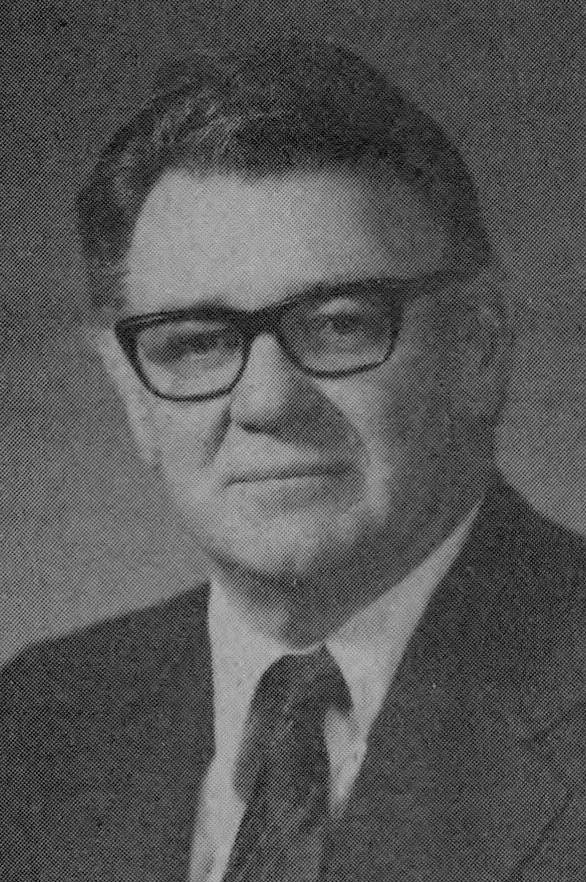

38th Chief Justice of the Oregon Supreme Court
- In office 1982–1983
- Preceded by: Arno H. Denecke
- Succeeded by: Edwin J. Peterson

78th Justice of the Oregon Supreme Court
- In office 1977–1988
- Preceded by: Kenneth J. O'Connell
- Succeeded by: George Van Hoomissen

Personal details
- Born: September 22, 1921 Los Angeles, California
- Died: November 11, 2007 (aged 86) Las Vegas, Nevada
- Spouse: Joan Lent

Berkeley "Bud" Lent (September 22, 1921 – November 11, 2007) was an American politician and jurist in the state of Oregon. He was the 38th Chief Justice of the Oregon Supreme Court, serving from 1982 to 1983. Elected to the court in 1976, Lent remained until 1988. Previously, the native Oregonian also was elected to both branches of the Oregon legislature, including time as the Senate Majority Leader, and was a county circuit court judge. Lent also served as a mediator and senior judge in Oregon.

== Early life ==
On September 22, 1921, Lent was born in Los Angeles, CA. Raised in the Lents neighborhood of southeast Portland, Berkeley earned his primary education there, graduating from Franklin High School. After high school he moved to Los Angeles, California, where he attended Occidental College from 1944 to 1945. Also in 1944, he married Dorothy Welch. Lent joined the United States Navy that year. Lent then returned to Portland where he attended Reed College, graduating in 1948.

He then went on to law school at Willamette University College of Law where he graduated with his Juris Doctor in 1950 and was president of his class his final year. After law school Lent moved to San Francisco, California, and worked for Bancroft-Whitney Law Publishing Company as an editor. He then returned to Portland and worked for the Bonneville Power Administration as a staff attorney. After practicing law in Coos Bay, Oregon, Lent returned again to Portland and began working at the law firm of Peterson & Pozzi beginning in 1953.

== Political career ==
Berkeley Lent began his political life in the state house as a Democrat from Portland, serving at the 1957 session. He remained in the House through 1965, and that year serving as the Minority Whip. He then served in the state senate from 1967 to 1971. During the 1971 legislative session Lent was selected as the Senate Majority Leader after losing the Senate Presidency when a rural conservative Democrat, himself a former Senate President, joined Republicans to deny Lent the Senate Presidency. The defection caused a 15–15 deadlock that lasted for 12 days and through 54 ballots before being broken. Later that year Lent was appointed as a county circuit court judge in Multnomah County remaining at that post until 1977.

Lent was elected to the Oregon Supreme Court in November 1976 to replace the outgoing Kenneth O'Connell. Justice Lent was then re-elected to another six-year term in 1982. On the court his fellow justices elected him as chief justice in July 1982, serving until resigning the position in August 1983. Justice Lent then resigned from the bench on September 30, 1988. George Van Hoomissen was elected in May of that year to replace Lent.

== Later life and family ==
After leaving the court and political office, Lent worked in alternative dispute resolution as an arbitrator and mediator, as well as a senior judge for the state of Oregon. He divorced his first wife Dorothy in 1961 and remarried in 1968 to Joan Burnett, with the family moving to Las Vegas, Nevada, after Lent's retirement. He had one son, Eric, and four daughters, Terry, Deirdre, Suzanne, and Patricia. Berkeley Lent died of a heart attack in Las Vegas on November 11, 2007.
