= J. R. Campbell (judge) =

American judge

82nd Justice of the Oregon Supreme Court
- In office 1980–1988
- Preceded by: Edward H. Howell
- Succeeded by: Edward N. Fadeley

Judge of the Oregon Court of Appeals
- In office 1979–1980
- Preceded by: Lee Johnson
- Succeeded by: Thomas F. Young

Personal details
- Born: July 9, 1918 Carpenter Creek, Musselshell County, Montana, U.S.
- Died: January 11, 1990 (aged 71)

J. R. Campbell (born July 9, 1918 – January 11, 1990), nicknamed Doc, was an American attorney in the state of Oregon, United States. He was the 82nd justice of the Oregon Supreme Court and served on the Oregon Court of Appeals. The Navy veteran from Montana also worked as a circuit court judge in Oregon.

== Early life ==
On July 9, 1918, J. R. Campbell was born to Claude W. Campbell and Maude M. Campbell in Carpenter Creek, Musselshell County, Montana. After receiving his primary education in Eastern Montana he moved to Salem, Oregon, where he attended Willamette University, graduating with a Bachelor of Arts in 1940. Campbell then went on to law school at Willamette University College of Law where he graduated with his Juris Doctor in 1942. He was then admitted to both the Montana and Oregon bars. With World War II in progress he joined the United States Navy after law school. Serving in the Navy from 1942 until 1945, Campbell spent two years in the Pacific Theater.

== Legal career ==
After returning from the war, Campbell returned to Oregon and began legal practice in Eastern Oregon’s Grant County until 1965. That year he was appointed to Oregon’s 11th Judicial District for the circuit court, and subsequently won election to the post in 1966. Campbell won re-election in 1972 and 1978.

On March 19, 1979, Campbell was appointed to the Oregon Court of Appeals by Governor Victor G. Atiyeh to replace Lee Johnson who resigned. Campbell won a full six-year term later that year and then resigned from the court on November 30, 1980. He resigned to join the Oregon Supreme Court when Governor Atiyeh appointed him to replace Edward H. Howell on December 1, 1980. While on the court, Campbell was known as the quietest justice during oral arguments. Campbell won election to a full term in 1982 and resigned at the end of his term on December 31, 1988 after not seeking re-election.
