= George M. Joseph =

American judge

George Manley Joseph (1930–2003) was the chief judge of the Oregon Court of Appeals from 1981 to 1992. He graduated from Reed College and the University of Chicago Law School, and practiced law in the U.S. state of Oregon, representing business and corporate clients, until Governor Robert W. Straub appointed him to the bench in 1977. He was named Chief Judge of the Oregon Court of Appeals in 1981.

== Career outside the law ==
Joseph served as a faculty member at a number of law schools and as a trustee of Reed.

== Personal life ==
Joseph was a distant relative of noted attorney, state senator, and gubernatorial nominee George W. Joseph. He was married and had five children.
