= Oregon Department of Justice =

Main legal branch of the government of Oregon, U.S.

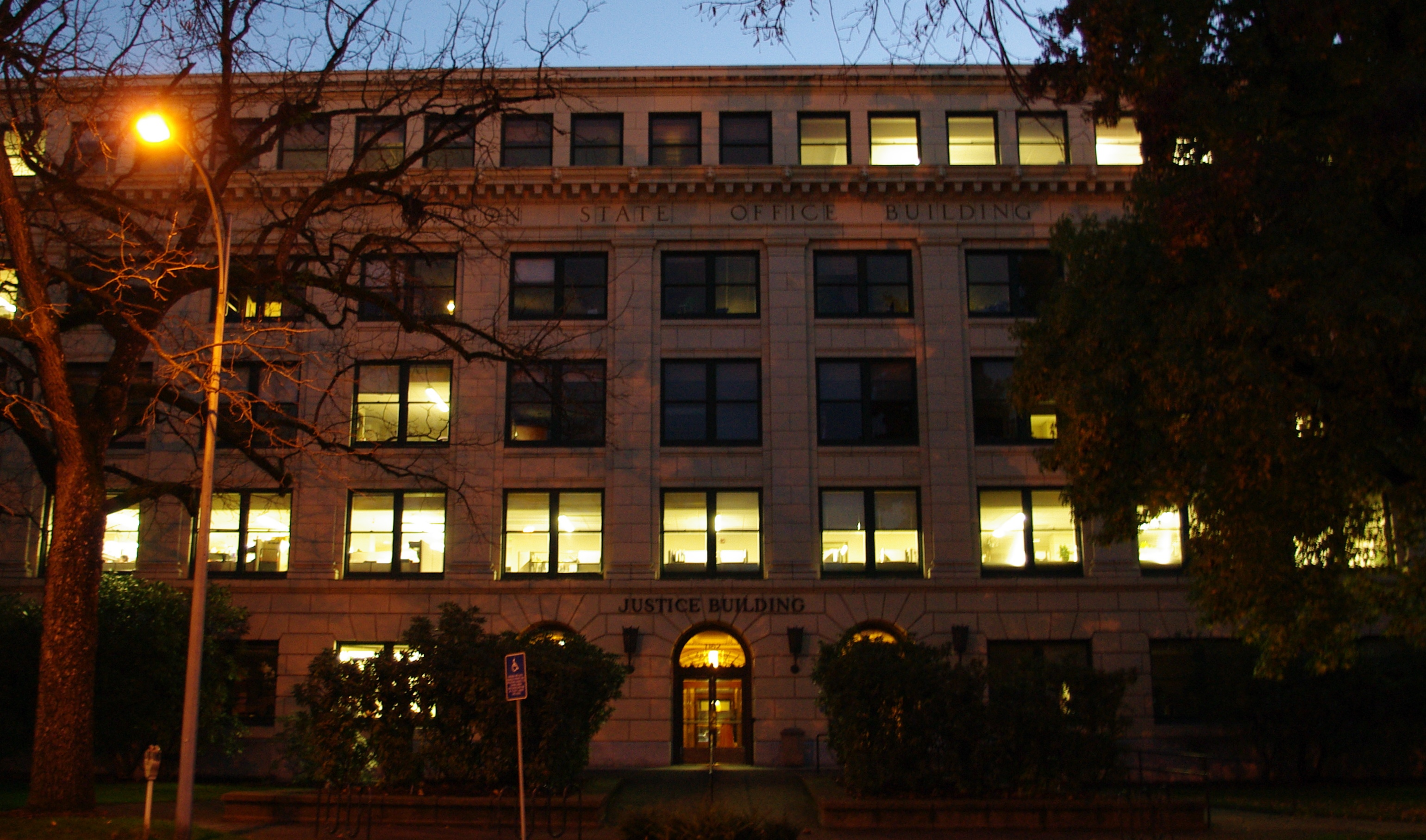
Main office in Salem

The Oregon Department of Justice (DOJ), headed by the Oregon Attorney General (currently Dan Rayfield), is the main legal branch of the government of the U.S. state of Oregon. The DOJ is part of Oregon's executive branch, and most of its employees work in Oregon's capital, Salem. The Department is equivalent to the State Bureau of Investigation in other states. Employing about 1200 employees statewide, the department's biennial budget is approximately US$280 million.

The DOJ provides legal counsel to the state anytime Oregon is a party or has an interest in a civil action or other legal proceeding. As ordered by the Oregon State Legislature, the Department of Justice is also tasked with running programs concerning child support payments, charitable activity enforcement, district attorney assistance, crime victim compensation, and protecting consumers. The divisions responsible for these and other programs are the Trial Division, Appellate Division, Criminal Justice Division, General Counsel Division, Administrative Services Division, Child Support Division, Civil Enforcement Divisions, and the Crime Victims' Services Division.
