= John Hugh McNary =

American judge

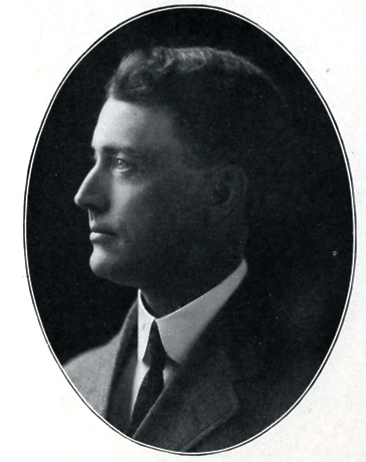
- McNary in 1910

Judge of the United States District Court for the District of Oregon
- In office February 28, 1927 – October 25, 1936
- Appointed by: Calvin Coolidge
- Preceded by: Charles E. Wolverton
- Succeeded by: Claude C. McColloch

Personal details
- Born: John Hugh McNary; January 31, 1867 Salem, Oregon
- Died: October 25, 1936 (aged 69) Portland, Oregon
- Resting place: Salem Pioneer Cemetery; Salem, Oregon
- Party: Republican
- Relatives: Charles L. McNary
- Education: University of Oregon

John Hugh McNary (January 31, 1867 – October 25, 1936) was an American attorney and jurist in the state of Oregon. He served as a United States district judge of the United States District Court for the District of Oregon in Portland. A native of Oregon, he also served as a district attorney and as an assistant district attorney in Salem. His brother Charles would serve as a United States senator.

== Early life and education ==
McNary was born on January 31, 1867, on a farm in Marion County, Oregon, to Hugh Linza McNary and Margaret Claggett McNary. The McNary family farm was north of Salem, where McNary's parents would raise ten children. McNary's grandfather was James McNary who immigrated to Oregon Country from Kentucky in 1845, while his maternal grandfather immigrated from Missouri in 1852. His father Hugh was a former brickyard operator and school teacher. His mother died in 1878; his father died in 1883. McNary was educated in the local public schools in Marion County before attending Willamette University. John received his college education at the University of Oregon in Eugene. In 1890, he was elected as the recorder for Marion County. After college he read law under the guidance of George H. Burnett, and passed the state bar in June 1894 and federal bar on July 17, 1901. On January 29, 1892, he married Esther Hall. A Republican, he also served as President of the county's bar association.

== Career ==
Beginning in 1897, McNary taught the law to his younger brother Charles L. McNary in Salem. Charles passed the bar in 1898 and joined his brother in practicing law in Salem. McNary was in private practice from 1898 until 1913. During this time, he served as deputy district attorney for Marion County between 1898 and 1904, and in 1905 became the district attorney for Oregon’s third judicial district. While in office he helped to prosecute some of those involved in the Oregon land fraud scandal. When McNary was the district attorney, his brother worked under him as an assistant district attorney. In 1912, he taught at the Willamette University College of Law as a professor of corporations under his brother who was the dean.

== Federal judicial service ==
McNary was nominated by President Calvin Coolidge on February 26, 1927, to a seat on the United States District Court for the District of Oregon vacated by Judge Charles E. Wolverton. He was confirmed by the United States Senate on February 28, 1927, and received his commission the same day. His service terminated on October 25, 1936, due to his death.

== Death and funeral ==
McNary died in Portland, Oregon on October 25, 1936. He was buried at the Salem Pioneer Cemetery, with his funeral attended by others in the legal community including E. M. Page, James Alger Fee, James U. Campbell, John O. Bailey, Harry H. Belt, John L. Rand, George Rossman, Percy R. Kelly, and Henry J. Bean.

Legal offices
Preceded by Charles E. Wolverton	Judge of the United States District Court for the District of Oregon; 1927–1936	Succeeded by Claude C. McColloch
