= William Marion Ramsey =

American judge (1846–1937)

Justice of the Oregon Supreme Court
- In office 1913–1915
- Appointed by: Oswald West
- Preceded by: new position
- Succeeded by: Lawrence T. Harris

Personal details
- Born: December 25, 1846 Iowa
- Died: September 15, 1937 (aged 90) Oregon
- Spouse(s): Mahala A. Harris; Julia A. Snyder
- Relatives: Anne Ramsey (Niece)

William Marion Ramsay (December 25, 1846 – September 15, 1937) was an American politician and judge in Oregon. He was the 43rd person to service as one of the justices of the Oregon Supreme Court (since the Court's founding in 1848) serving from 1913 to 1915. He was also the first dean of Willamette University College of Law and a mayor of Salem, Oregon, and McMinnville, Oregon.

== Early life ==
William Ramsay was born on Christmas Day 1846 in Monroe County, Iowa. The next year the family traveled the Oregon Trail and settled near the town of Newberg in Oregon Country. Arriving in the fall of 1847, William's parents Susan Shuck (d. 1898) and David Ramsey (d. 1891) homesteaded on the same site as Ewing Young's former mill. William was the youngest of five children in the family when they moved to Oregon, although his parents later had nine more children. He was schooled in the local public schools before attending and graduating from McMinnville College. William read law in Yamhill County and passed the bar, becoming a lawyer in 1868. Two years later he married Mahala A. Harris with whom he fathered four children.

== Legal career ==
In 1870, William was elected as the county judge for Yamhill County. He then practiced law in Lafayette, Oregon for ten years including for a time as a law partner with Benjamin F. Bonham, the two were partners from 1876 until 1885. From 1883 to 1888 Ramsey served as the first dean for Willamette University College of Law in Salem, Oregon, where he was in charge of a staff of three professors. While in Salem he also served as mayor before moving to east to Pendleton, Oregon, and La Grande, Oregon, (1902–1911) and then settling again in McMinnville, Oregon, where he served two terms as mayor.

On June 3, 1913, Oregon Governor Oswald West appointed Ramsey and fellow former Willamette Law dean Charles L. McNary to the state supreme court bench when the court expanded from five to seven justices. Ramsey, a Democrat, ran for re-election in 1914, but lost to Lawrence T. Harris. Both McNary and Ramsey left the court at the end of the term on January 4, 1915.

== Family ==
William's son Frederick served as a sergeant in the US Marine Corps aboard the Battleship Oregon during the Spanish–American War. After his first wife died William married Julia A. Snyder in 1896, and they had one daughter. William Marion Ramsey died on September 15, 1937, at the age of 91 and was buried in McMinnville at a funeral attended by several Oregon Supreme Court justices including Henry J. Bean, John O. Bailey, John L. Rand, and Percy R. Kelly.

Willamette University's law school holds an annual lecture in his honor.

Academic offices
Preceded by position created	Dean of Willamette University College of Law; 1883–1888	Succeeded by George G. Bingham
