= 19th Oregon Legislative Assembly =

Term of state legislature in Oregon, US

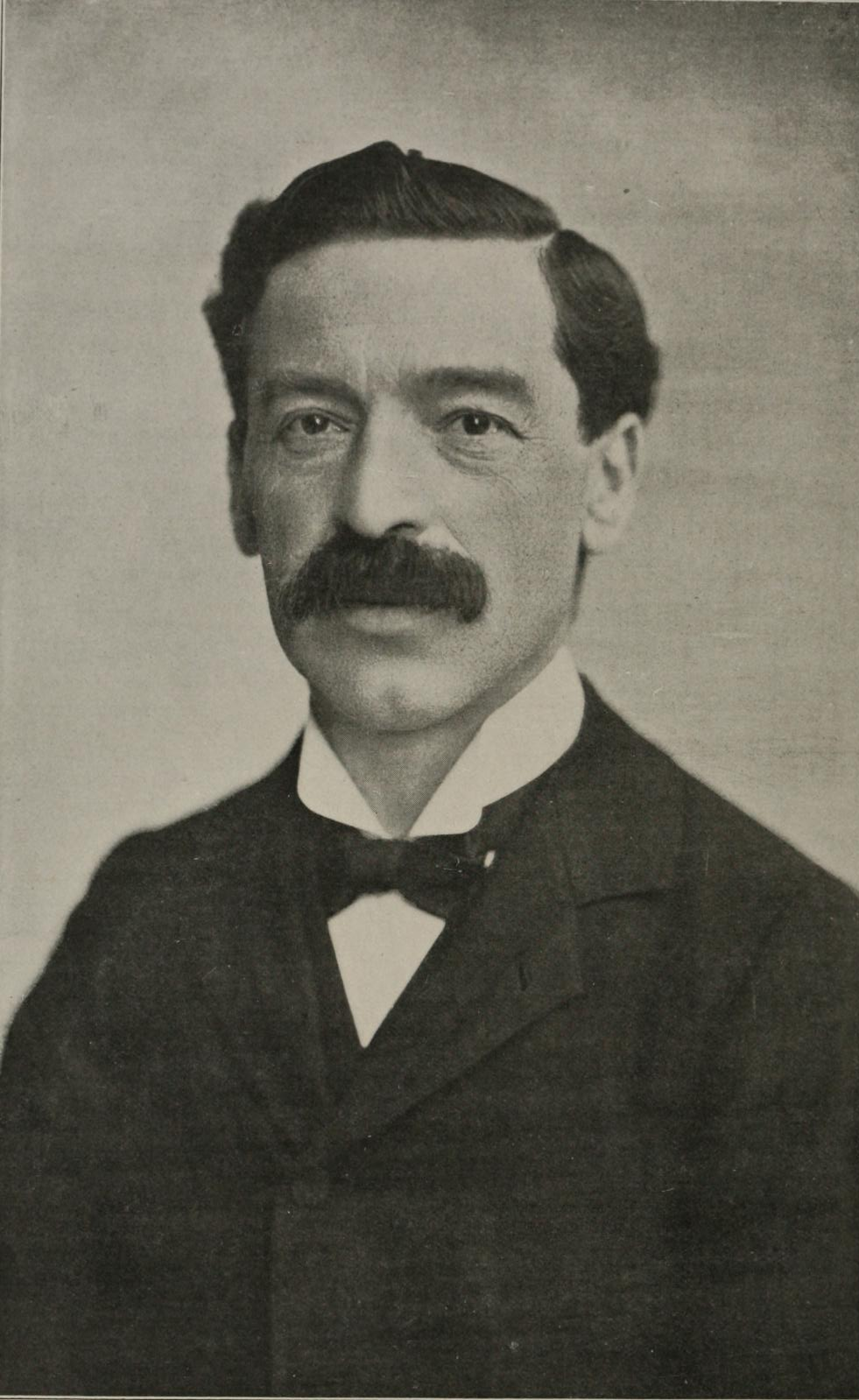
Senate President Joseph Simon

The 19th Oregon Legislative Assembly was scheduled to convene January 11, 1897. The Senate organized, but the House failed to do so. In the House, two factions formed, neither of which had enough members to constitute a quorum.

The Senate elected Joseph Simon as its president for the term, and conducted what business it could without the House's support. It stayed in session for 40 days. Due to the House's failure to organize, no legislation was passed during the session, and Oregon failed to elect a United States senator. Henry L. Benson and E. J. Davis were the Speakers chosen by the two rival factions; neither served as Speaker during any other session.

The legislature held a special session in 1898, from September 26 to October 15. During that session, Simon was chosen as U.S. Senator, filling a seat that had been vacant for nearly two years. E. V. Carter served as House speaker during the special session.

William Paine Lord was governor during the 19th Legislative Assembly, serving the final two years of his single 4-year term.

== Members of the House ==
Legislator	County	District	Party
H. L. Barkley	Woodburn, Marion	30	R
J. B. Bayer	Portland, Multnomah	36	R
Henry L. Benson	Grants Pass, Josephine	21	R
L. Bilyeu	Eugene, Lane	23	D
Jonathan Bourne, Jr.	Portland, Multnomah	37	R
J. T. Bridges	Drain, Douglas	14	R
J. N. Brown	Hopper, Morrow	35	R
Thomas Buckman	Bandon, Coos	10	P
E. W. Chapman	Brooks, Marion	31	R
Virgil Conn	Paisley, Lake, Klamath	22	R
David Craig	Macleay, Marion	32	R
A. M. Crawford	Roseburg, Douglas	13	R
J. E. David	Crow, Sherman	16	R
E. J. Davis	Milton, Umatilla	50	R
James N. Davis	Portland, Multnomah	38	R
C. S. Dustin	Long Creek, Grant, Harney	17	P
O. C. Emery	Newberg, Yamhill	60	U
John Gill	Chase, Yamhill, Tillamook	49	U
John E. Gratke	Astoria, Clatsop	7	D
H. G. Guild	Sheridan, Yamhill	59	U
J. S. Gurdane	Ridge, Umatilla	51	R
George H. Hill	Portland, Multnomah	39	R
H. A. Hogue	Portland, Multnomah	40	R
I. W. Hope	Vale, Malheur	29	R
J. J. Howser	Sams Valley, Jackson	19	P
Harvey S. Hudson	Gaston, Washington	56	R
Bela S. Huntington	The Dalles, Wasco	47	R
C. E. Jennings	Joseph, Wallowa	55	R
F. N. Jones	Baker, Wasco	48	R
J. H. Kruse	Oswego, Clackamas	6	P
E. R. Lake	Corvallis, Benton	3	R
Nat Langell	Jacksonville, Jackson	20	R
I. J. Lee	Independence, Polk	45	D
G. W. Marsh	Cornelius, Washington	57	R
A. L. Maxwel	Portland, Multnomah	41	R
J. W. McAllister	La Grande, Union	53	P
Normal Merrill	Clatskanie, Columbia	9	R
R. W. Misener	Mitchell, Crook	12	D
McKinley Mitchell	Corvallis, Marion	33	R
T. M. Munkers	Scio, Linn	28	P
W. H. Nosler	Coquille City, Coos	11	P
George Ogle	Molalla, Clackamas	5	P
D. G. Palm	Lorane, Lane	24	R
D. L. Povey	Portland, Multnomah	42	R
George W. Riddle	Riddle, Douglas	15	R
W. T. Rigby	Pendleton, Umatilla	52	R
G. F. Schmidtlein	Woodville, Jackson	18	P
J. N. Smith	Salem, Marion	34	R
Johnson S. Smith	Linn	27	
John M. Somers	Albany, Linn	26	R
F. S. Stanley	Perry, Union	54	R
N. J. Svindseth	Astoria, Clatsop	8	P
W. E. Thomas	Portland, Multnomah	43	R
J. R. C. Thompson	Tulatin, Washington	58	R
William Simon U'Ren	Milwaukie, Clackamas	4	P
T. J. Vaughan	Coburg, Lane	25	R
J. A. Veness	Independence, Polk	46	R
Henry Wagner	Portland, Multnomah	44	R
John Whitaker	Corvallis, Benton	2	P
D. W. Yoakum	Express, Baker	1	P

== Members of the Senate ==
Legislator	County	District	Party
George W. Bates	Portland, Multnomah	19	R
George C. Brownell	Oregon City, Clackamas	3	R
John F. Calbreath	McMinnville, Yamhill	30	R
Tolbert Carter	Wells, Benton, Lincoln	2	R
Bernard Daly	Lakeview, Crook, Klamath, Lake	8	D
S. A. Dawson	Albany, Linn	15	R
I. D. Driver	Eugene, Lane	13	R
Enoch B. Dufur	The Dalles, Gilliam, Sherman, Wasco	10	D
Alonzo Gesner	Salem, Marion, Clackamas	4	R
A. W. Gowan	Burns, Harney, Grant, Morrow	11	R
C. E. Harmon	Grants Pass, Coos, Curry, Josephine	7	R
J. E. Haseltine	Portland, Multnomah	20	R
W. H. Hobson	Stayton, Marion	17	R
S. H. Holt	Phoenix, Jackson	12	P
Samuel Hughes	Forest Grove, Washington	29	R
Archie J. Johnson	Scio, Linn	16	R
Will R. King	Baker City, Baker, Malheur	1	P
Donald Mackay	Portland, Multnomah	21	R
J. H. McClung	Eugene, Lane	14	R
John Mitchell	The Dalles, Wasco, Sherman	25	R
B. F. Mulkey	Dallas, Polk	24	R
Isaac Lee Patterson	Cincinnati (Eola), Marion, Polk	18	R
George W. Patterson	Hillsboro, Columbia, Tillamook, Washington	6	R
A. R. Price	Weston, Umatilla	26	R
A. W. Reed	Gardiner, Douglas	9	R
Ben Selling	Portland, Multnomah	22	R
Joseph Simon	Portland, Multnomah	23	R
John H. Smith	Astoria, Clatsop	5	D
Thomas C. Taylor	Pendleton, Umatilla, Union	27	R
Justus Wade	Summerville, Union, Wallowa	28	P

== See also ==
- John H. Mitchell, a U.S. Senator whose campaign for reelection was involved in the House's failure to organize.
