= Justice Ramsey =

Justice Ramsey may refer to:

- Vivian Ramsey (born 1950), judge of the High Court of England and Wales
- William F. Ramsey (1855–1922), associate justice of the Texas Supreme Court
- William Marion Ramsey (1846–1937), associate justice of the Oregon Supreme Court

== See also ==
- Andrew Ramsay, Lord Abbotshall (1619–1688), first Lord Provost of Edinburgh and a judge of the Court of Session
