= David Howitt =

David Howitt may refer to:

- Dave Howitt (born 1952), English footballer
- David Howitt (entrepreneur) (born 1950), American business consultant
