= Max Page (disambiguation) =

Max Page may refer to:

- Major-General Sir Charles Max Page (1882-1963), a British surgeon
- Max Page (actor)

== See also ==
- Everill Max Page, lawyer
