= Latourette =

Latourette is a surname. Notable people with the surname include:

- Earl C. Latourette (1889–1956), American judge, Chief Justice of the Oregon Supreme Court
- Kenneth Scott Latourette (1884–1968), American historian of East Asia and Christianity
- Steve LaTourette (1954–2016), American politician
- Sarah LaTourette (born 1984), American politician
