= Jack Faust =

Jack Faust may refer to:

- Jack Faust (attorney) (born 1932), attorney and television broadcaster in Oregon
- Jack Faust (novel), a 1997 novel by American author Michael Swanwick
