= James T. Brand =

American judge (1886–1964)

James Tenney Brand

31st Chief Justice of the Oregon Supreme Court
- In office 1951–1953
- Preceded by: Hall S. Lusk
- Succeeded by: Earl C. Latourette

61st Justice of the Oregon Supreme Court
- In office 1941–1958
- Appointed by: Douglas McKay
- Preceded by: Henry J. Bean
- Succeeded by: Kenneth J. O'Connell

Personal details
- Born: October 9, 1886
- Died: February 28, 1964 (aged 77) Phoenix, Arizona
- Spouse: Irene Morley

James Tenney Brand (October 9, 1886 – February 28, 1964) was the 31st Chief Justice of the Oregon Supreme Court, serving in that role from 1951 to 1953. While serving on court from 1941 to 1958 his service was interrupted when he was chosen to be a judge on a military tribunal adjudicating Nazi war crimes after World War II.

== Early life ==
James Tenney Brand was born in Oberlin, Ohio, on October 9, 1886. Brand graduated from Oberlin High School in Oberlin in 1905. Next he graduated from Oberlin College in 1909, followed by Harvard Law School where he graduated in 1914. After graduation Brand worked for the U.S. Forest Service when he moved to Oregon. In 1916 he married Irene Morley.

Once in Oregon he was in private practice in Coos Bay, Oregon, before serving as the city attorney for Marshfield, Oregon, (now called Coos Bay) from 1917 to 1927. Brand was then appointed as a Circuit Judge in Marshfield, Oregon, located in the southwestern section of the state. He served for 14 years in that position. He was living in Marshfield in 1936 when he attended the funeral of John H. McNary.

== Judicial career ==
Brand was appointed to the Oregon Supreme Court on May 14, 1941 by Oregon Governor Charles A. Sprague. Brand replaced Henry J. Bean, who had died in office on May 8, 1941. Then, in 1942, Justice Brand received a full six-year term after winning the election.

In 1947 Justice Brand was appointed by the War Department to the War Crimes Tribunal to be convened in Germany after World War II. There he was one of four judges of Nazi War Crimes at the Judges' Trial, the third in a set of twelve trials collectively known as the Subsequent Nuremberg Trials. The trial began in March 1947 with Brand as a member of a three-person Military Tribunal, but on June 19, 1947, he became the Presiding Judge when Carrington T. Marshall resigned for health reasons.

After returning from Germany he resumed his position on Oregon's highest court. James Brand won re-election in both 1948 and 1954. In between elections he was chosen by his fellow justices to serve as chief justice from 1951 to 1953. Justice Brand resigned his position on the bench on June 30, 1958.

== Later life and family ==
After retiring from the court Brand became a professor at Stetson University College of Law in Florida. Justice Brand died in Phoenix, Arizona, while on vacation on February 28, 1964, at the age of 77. He was survived by his wife Irene Morley and his son Col. Thomas Brand who served in the Judge Advocate General Corps.

== Other ==
- Speaker at: Postwar problems of the Pacific and world organization, held in March 1944.
- In the movie Judgment at Nuremberg starring Spencer Tracy, Tracy’s character is modeled after Brand.
- Hattie Bratzel Kremen the first women in Oregon elected as a district attorney served as Justice Brand’s personal secretary and court reporter, even accompanying him to Germany.
- Authored: The Insanity Defense, 9 Ore. L. Rev. 309 (1930)
- Authored: Montesquieu and the Separation of Power, 12 Ore. L. Rev. 175 (1933)
- Authored: Crimes against humanity and the Nürnberg trials, 28 Ore. L. Rev. 93 (1949)

== Decisions authored ==
- Mutzig v. Hope, 176 Or. 368, 158 P.2d 110 (1945) (jurisdiction, venue)
- Marsh v. McLaughlin, 210 Or. 84, 309 P.2d 188 (1957) (torts)
