= Martin L. Pipes =

American judge

Martin Luther Pipes
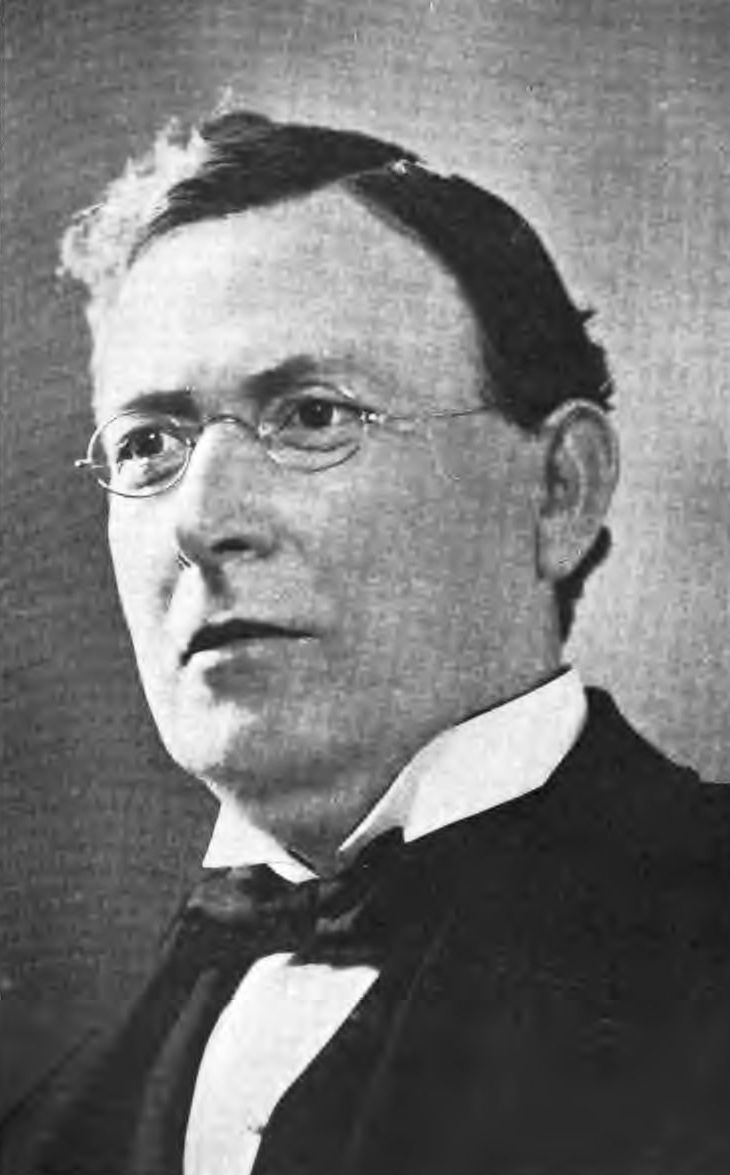

54th Justice of the Oregon Supreme Court
- In office 1924–1924
- Appointed by: Walter M. Pierce
- Preceded by: John McCourt
- Succeeded by: Harry H. Belt

Personal details
- Born: September 21, 1850 Ascension Parish, Louisiana
- Died: July 15, 1932 (aged 81) Portland, Oregon
- Spouse: Mary Curtis Skipworth

Martin Luther Pipes (September 21, 1850 – July 15, 1932) was an American attorney and judge in Oregon. He was the 54th justice of the Oregon Supreme Court. A Louisiana native, he also was a judge on the Oregon Circuit Court and a member of the Oregon House of Representatives.

== Early life ==
Martin Pipes was born to John Pipes and Harriet Shaffer Pipes in Ascension Parish, Louisiana on September 21, 1850. In Louisiana Martin received his education and graduated in 1871 from Louisiana State Seminary. On November 1, 1874 Pipes married Mary Curtis Skipworth in his home state. The couple would have five children together. The family moved to Oregon the following year and arrived on June 1, 1875, settling in Independence in the Willamette Valley.

== Career ==
In Independence Martin was a school teacher, newspaper editor, and the first president of the Oregon Editorial Association. From 1878 to 1881 he was a justice of the peace and city recorder. During this time in 1880 he was elected and served in the Oregon House of Representatives as a Democrat from Polk County. In 1881 he passed the bar and began practicing law there and in neighboring Dallas, Oregon until 1884. Then in 1884 he moved south to Corvallis, Oregon where he practiced law until 1890.

In 1890 he became a state circuit court judge in Corvallis, serving until 1892. That year Martin moved to Portland, Oregon, where he practiced law until 1932. While in Portland he worked with Joseph Simon in settling the estate of entrepreneur Simeon Gannett Reed that help lead to the establishment of Reed College in Portland. In 1910 he was a professor at the University of Oregon School of Law when it was located in Portland. On September 12, 1924, Pipes was appointed to the Oregon Supreme Court to replace John McCourt by Oregon Governor Walter M. Pierce after McCourt died in office. Pipes only served until the end of the term on December 31, 1924. Martin Luther Pipes returned to law practice in Portland where he died on July 15, 1932.

=== United States Supreme Court ===
While in private legal practice in 1902 Pipes was an attorney for the plaintiff against the city of Portland in the United States Supreme Court case of King v. City of Portland. Later he was an attorney involved in the case of Ross v. State of Oregon, representing the defendant in error, Oregon. In 1923 and 1925 he argued unsuccessfully with co-counsel William R. King to force the United States to pay back wages to postmaster Frank Myers in the landmark Myers v. United States decision of the court.

== Other ==
In 1926, Martin Pipes had his son Wade Hampton Pipes, an architect, design and build a Tudor style home for the family in Southwest Portland. Pipes lived in the home until his death in 1932, and his widow remained there until 1944. The Martin Luther Pipes House was listed on the National Register of Historic Places in 1987. Wade Pipes was considered the "foremost exponent of English Cottage architecture" in the state. His daughter, Nellie Bowden Pipes, was librarian of the Oregon Historical Society and editor of its Oregon Historical Quarterly; she married Lewis Ankeny McArthur.
