= Henry Bean (disambiguation) =

Henry Bean (born 1945) is an American filmmaker and actor.

Henry Bean may also refer to:

- Henry J. Bean (1853–1941), American politician and judge
- Henry Bean, killed in Bear River Massacre

== See also ==
- William Henry Bean (c. 1843–?), Australian businessman and politician
