= Charles Wolverton =

Charles Wolverton may refer to:

- Charles A. Wolverton (1880–1969), U.S. representative from New Jersey
- Charles E. Wolverton (1851–1926), chief justice on the Oregon Supreme Court
