= Gustafson v. Payless Drug Stores NW, Inc. =

1974 malicious prosecution case in Oregon

Gustafson v. Payless Drug Stores
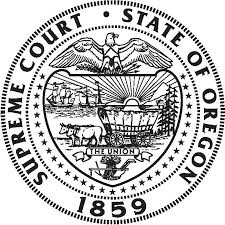
- Court: Oregon Supreme Court
- Full case name: Albertina Gustafson v. Payless Drug Stores NW, Inc.
- Decided: August 8, 1974
- Citation: 269 Or. 354, 525 P.2d 118 (1974)

Case history
- Subsequent action: none

Court membership
- Judges sitting: Arno H. Denecke, Ralph M. Holman, Dean F. Bryson, Thomas Tongue, Edward H. Howell with Virgil Langtry and Herbert M. Schwab serving Pro Tempore; Chief Justice Kenneth J. O'Connell, William M. McAllister not involved in decision.

Case opinions
- Denecke: Affirmed lower court.

Gustafson v. Payless Drug Stores was a 1974 decision of the Oregon Supreme Court regarding an alleged case of shoplifting. The case deals mainly with the issues of malice and probable cause from a legal standpoint.

== Facts ==
Albertina Gustafson (plaintiff), a resident of San Pedro, California, was visiting relatives in Salem, Oregon with her husband. On August 10, 1972, she and her mother-in-law visited the local Payless Drug Store (company later acquired by Rite Aid). Gustafson inadvertently left the store without paying for a pack of cigarettes, when a security officer then asked Gustafson to purchase the cigarettes. Gustafson said she apologized for her mistake and stated that she had been distracted talking to her mother-in-law and had forgotten to pay.

Upon re-entering the store, Gustafson was arrested for shoplifting a carton of cigarettes. The security officer notified the police, and the Gustafson was escorted to the police station, where she was charged with second-degree theft.

She subsequently filed a $130,726 lawsuit, claiming false arrest and malicious prosecution, and claiming that probable cause had not been established. The jury found in favor of Gustafson, and awarded $36,000 in damages, including $25,000 punitive. Payless appealed.

== Question ==
Was the lack of probable cause sufficient evidence of malice upon the part of the defendant to enable the jury to find for the plaintiff?

== Holding ==
Yes (Affirmed).

== Decision ==
In reciting the opinion of the court, Justice Denecke defined the requirements for the establishment of probable cause. Probable cause exists if the person initiating the action adheres to the following:

- reasonable belief that the person accused has acted or failed to act in a particular manner,
- belief that such acts or omissions constitute at common law or under an existing statute the offense charged against the accused.

Payless argued that the court erred in its decision, claiming probable cause had been established. Justice Denecke asserted that it is the duty of the court, not the jury, to determine probable cause. Furthermore, Denecke noted that the facts agreed upon by the court favored the defendant.

Thus the ruling provided the greatest possible merit to the defendant's claims and still found Payless had no probable cause to arrest the plaintiff. Specifically, when presenting their version of the facts, the defendant contradicted Mrs. Gustafson's statement in three particular areas.

1. The security guard claimed the plaintiff had exited the store with the cigarettes passing a checkout stand.(This indicates shoplifting, as it implies that the plaintiff knowingly exited the store without paying for the item.)
2. The security guard claimed the cigarettes had been placed on the far left of the vehicle, indicating an effort to conceal the merchandise.
3. Finally, the security guard claimed the plaintiff, when confronted about the cigarettes, stated that she forgot to pay, and that no apologies were made as claimed by Mrs. Gustafson.

To these three claims, the court responded that no attempt was made to conceal the cigarettes. Thus, even if it was supposed that the defendant was correct in its other two contradictions to the facts, probable cause had still not been established for the arrest. The plaintiff never behaved in a suspicious manner which would suggest shoplifting, or which implied guilt or provided probable cause.

Mrs. Gustafson kept the merchandise in plain view. She attempted to pay for the item. She waited for an extended period outside the store after exiting. She purchased additional items. None of this behavior is consistent with that of a shoplifter, and the security guard was aware of Gustafson's conduct.

Payless also contended that it had probable cause because it acted upon the advice of the deputy district attorney, and that the action against the plaintiff was brought as a result of the police officer and the deputy district attorney, as opposed to Payless itself although the deputy district attorney's involvement began after the arrest, and was predicated by the facts provided by Payless. These facts left out a number of relevant points. In failing to supply all the relevant details, Payless became instrumental in "putting the law in force," thus voiding the claim of probable cause through the advice of the deputy district attorney.

Denecke finally noted that it had been consistently held that the jury may make a finding of malice based upon a lack of probable cause. Given that probable cause was not established, sufficient evidence of malice was found upon the part of the defendant to enable the jury to find for the plaintiff.

== Dissent ==
Justice Holman dissented, noting that while the aforementioned facts are relevant to whether or not the plaintiff merely forgot to pay for the cigarettes, they were wholly irrelevant to whether the detective had probable cause to prosecute Mrs. Gustafson for shoplifting. Holman noted that the removal of merchandise from a store without paying is generally held as probable cause for shoplifting, as cited in the case of Delp v. Zapp's Drug and Variety Stores. Under this ruling, he argued that the defendant possessed probable cause.
