= Bunting v. Oregon =

- Supreme Court of the United States

Argued April 18, 1916 Reargued January 19, 1917 Decided April 9, 1917
- Full case name: Franklin O. Bunting, Plaintiff in Error v. The State of Oregon
- Citations: 243 U.S. 426 (more) 37 S. Ct. 435; 61 L. Ed. 830; 1917 U.S. LEXIS 2008

Case history
- Prior: 71 Or. 259 (1914)

Holding
- The court affirmed the decision of the Oregon Supreme Court, which upheld the state law, for a ten-hour work day, as constitutional.

Court membership
- Chief Justice Edward D. White Associate Justices Joseph McKenna · Oliver W. Holmes Jr. William R. Day · Willis Van Devanter; Mahlon Pitney · James C. McReynolds; Louis Brandeis · John H. Clarke

Case opinions
- Majority: McKenna, joined by Holmes, Day, Pitney, Clarke
- Dissent: White
- Dissent: Van Devanter
- Dissent: McReynolds
- Brandeis took no part in the consideration or decision of the case.

Bunting v. Oregon, 243 U.S. 426 (1917), is a case in which the Supreme Court of the United States upheld a ten-hour work day, which was accepted for both men and women, but the state minimum-wage laws were not changed until 20 years later.

Future Supreme Court justice Felix Frankfurter, along with future Oregon Supreme Court justices George M. Brown and John O. Bailey, represented Oregon on the appeal. W. Lair Thompson and former Senator for Oregon Charles W. Fulton represented Bunting.

== Background ==
A 1913 state law prescribed a ten-hour day for men and women and expanded the law regulating women's hours, which had been upheld in Muller v. Oregon. It also required businesses to pay time-and-a-half wages for overtime up to three hours a day. Oregon asserted that the law was an appropriate exercise of its police powers. Bunting failed to comply with the state's overtime regulations.

The question was whether the state could interfere with a citizen's right to form a contract, which is protected by the Fourteenth Amendment.

== Decision ==
The decision of the Oregon Supreme Court was upheld. The state acted within the scope of its police powers and had the authority to regulate the health, the safety, and the welfare of workers in Oregon.

Justice McKenna dismissed Bunting's contention that the law did nothing to preserve the health of employees. It was also found that the law did not provide an unfair advantage to certain types of employers in the labor market since it regulated the hours of service for workers, not the wages that they earned. Under the Oregon law, workers and their employers were still free to implement a wage scheme agreeable to both.

== See also ==
- List of United States Supreme Court cases, volume 243

== Sources ==
- Shi, David E.; George Brown Tindall (2004). America - A Narrative History, Brief (6th. ed.). Norton. ISBN 0-393-97813-3.
