= Isaac Homer Van Winkle =

American lawyer

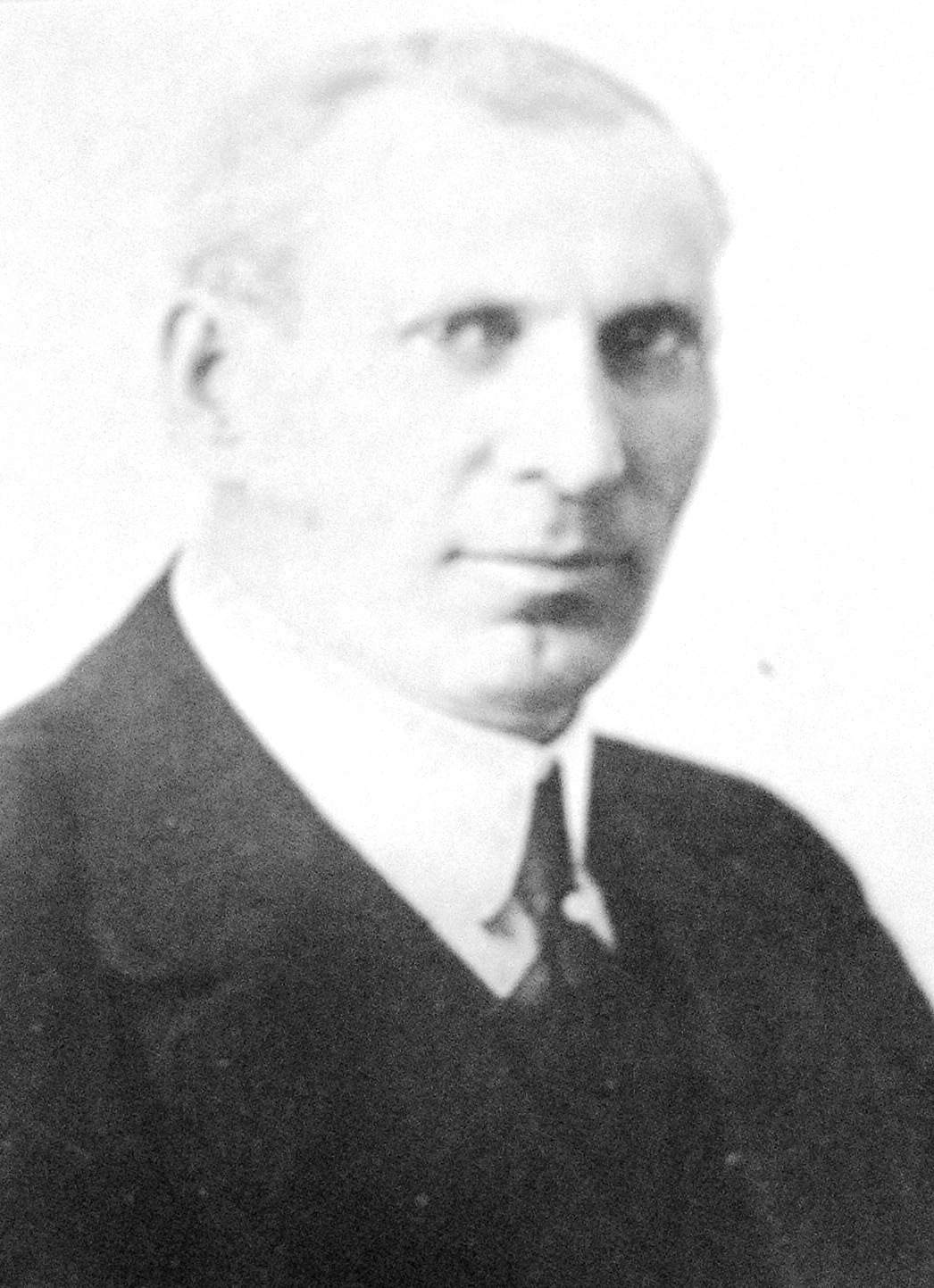
- Van Winkle in 1921

6th Oregon Attorney General
- In office October 14, 1920 – December 14, 1943
- Appointed by: Ben W. Olcott
- Preceded by: George M. Brown
- Succeeded by: George Neuner

Personal details
- Born: December 3, 1870 Halsey, Oregon
- Died: December 14, 1943 (aged 73) Salem, Oregon
- Party: Republican

Isaac Homer Van Winkle (December 3, 1870 – December 14, 1943) was an American attorney in the state of Oregon. A former dean of Willamette University's law school, he served as the 6th Attorney General of Oregon for 23 years.

== Early life ==
Van Winkle was born in Linn County, Oregon, near the community of Halsey, to Isaac Newton Van Winkle and Elizabeth Ann Pearl. Isaac graduated from Willamette University in Salem, Oregon, in 1898 with a Bachelor of Arts degree. In 1901, he graduated from Willamette University College of Law, where he later served as the sixth dean. On September 3, 1902, Isaac married Lella Velvetta Parrish, and they had one daughter named Rosalind. Lella died in 1918.

== Public service ==
In 1904, Van Winkle began serving as an assistant attorney general for Oregon, remaining in the post until 1920 (though not from 1913 to 1915). He was an instructor at Willamette's law school from 1905 to 1913. That year he began his tenure as dean of the school, remaining until 1927. The Van Winkle Melton Endowed Professorship at Willamette is named in his honor.

On October 14, 1920, Van Winkle was appointed as the sixth Oregon Attorney General by Oregon Governor Ben W. Olcott, to replace George M. Brown, who had resigned from the position. As a Republican, he was elected to a full four-year term later that year. Van Winkle won re-election in 1924, 1928, 1932, 1936, and 1940 before dying in office on December 14, 1943. Van Winkle's 23 years as Oregon's top lawyer are the longest of any attorney general in the state's history. In 1938, he ran for a position on the Oregon Supreme Court, but lost and remained as Attorney General.

Legal offices
| Preceded by George M. Brown | Oregon Attorney General; 1920-1943 | Succeeded by George Neuner |
Academic offices
| Preceded by Charles L. McNary | Dean of Willamette University College of Law; 1913–1927 | Succeeded by Roy R. Hewitt |
