= Charles B. Bellinger =

American judge

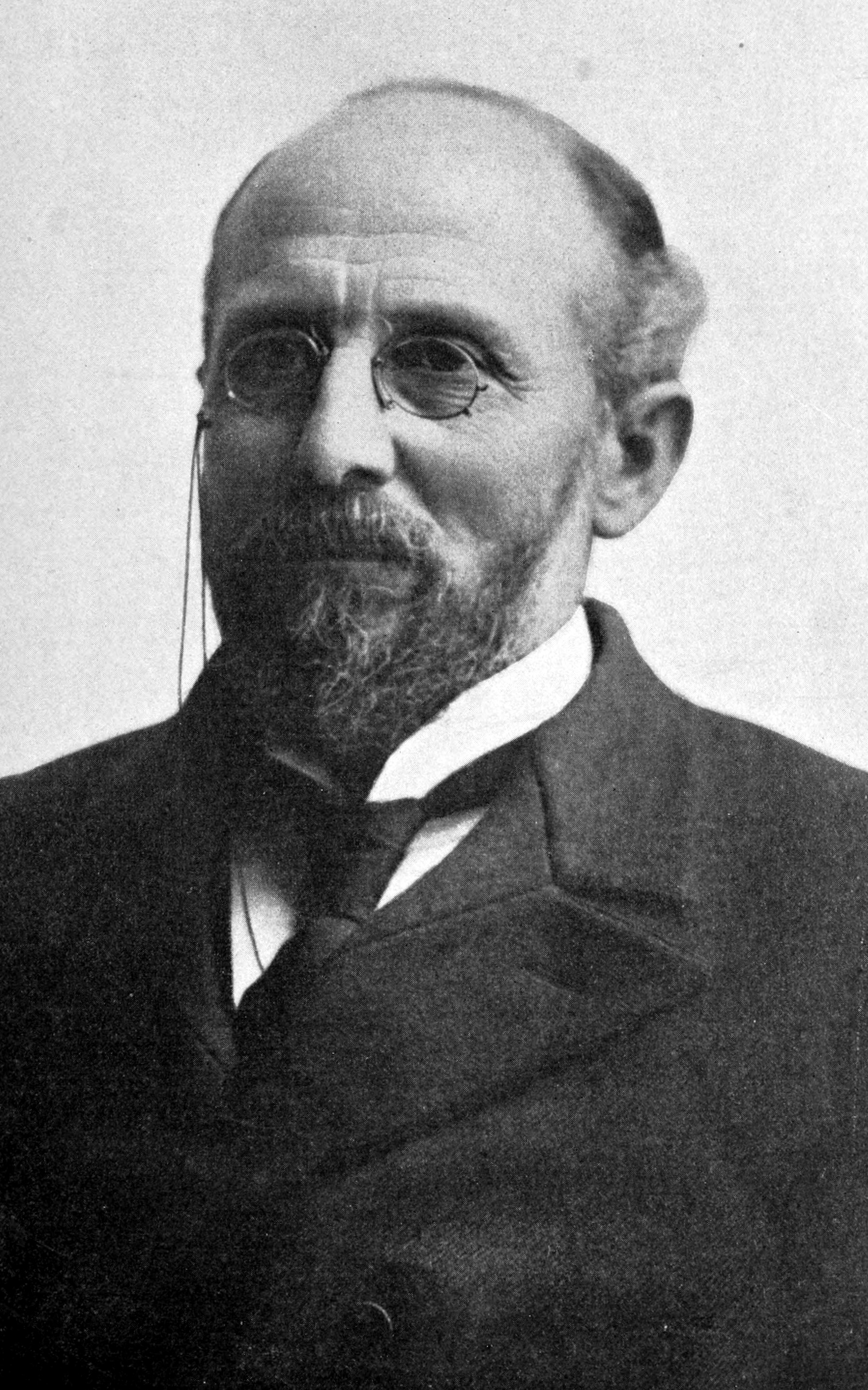

Judge of the United States District Court for the District of Oregon
- In office April 15, 1893 – May 12, 1905
- Appointed by: Grover Cleveland
- Preceded by: Matthew Deady
- Succeeded by: Charles E. Wolverton

Personal details
- Born: Charles Byron Bellinger; November 21, 1839 Maquon, Illinois
- Died: May 12, 1905 (aged 65) Portland, Oregon
- Resting place: Portland Memorial Mausoleum; Portland, Oregon
- Education: read law

Charles Byron Bellinger (November 21, 1839 – May 12, 1905) was a United States district judge of the United States District Court for the District of Oregon in Portland, Oregon. A native of Illinois, he also served as a state circuit court judge in Oregon, fought in the Modoc War in 1873, and was a newspaper editor. Politically, he previously served in the Oregon Legislative Assembly and as clerk to the Oregon Supreme Court.

== Early life ==
Bellinger was born in Maquon, Illinois on November 21, 1839. In 1847, with his parents, Edward H. Bellinger and Eliza Howard Bellinger, Charles moved to Oregon Country. The following year the region became the Oregon Territory, and was admitted to the Union in 1859. Bellinger received his education at a school near the Santiam River where his teacher was Orange Jacobs, later a judge and politician in Washington. Later, Bellinger enrolled at Willamette University in Salem, Oregon, where he attended for two years. He left Willamette in order to read law under attorney and later judge Benjamin F. Bonham, after which he passed the bar in 1863. Bellinger practiced law briefly before moving to the newspaper business and was an editor for the Salem paper, The Arena. He later worked for the Salem Argus before becoming a merchant in Monroe, Oregon, in 1866.

== Political career ==
In 1868, Bellinger began one term in the Oregon House of Representatives, representing Benton County. The next year he moved to Albany, Oregon, where he worked as editor of the States Rights Democrat newspaper, now Albany Democrat-Herald. In 1870, he left the paper and moved to Portland where he edited the Portland Daily News, and the following year served as a prosecuting attorney for the state. Bellinger remained with the newspaper until 1890, but worked as a prosecuting attorney until 1872.

From 1873 until 1874 he served in the Oregon militia as a lieutenant colonel. During this time he served in the Modoc War during the Lava Beds campaign. Following his military service, Bellinger moved to Salem where he was the clerk for the Oregon Supreme Court from 1874 to 1878. He left the state's highest court to accept a judgeship for Oregon's fourth judicial district, serving until 1880.

Bellinger returned to private practice in Portland in 1880, where he remained until 1893. For three years he was in practice with John M. Gearin, before becoming a partner in the firm of Dolph, Bellinger, Mallory, & Simon. Partners Cyrus A. Dolph, Rufus Mallory a member of the United States House of Representatives 1867-1869 & Joseph Simon United States Senator for Oregon 1898-1903 and Mayor of Portland 1909-1911.

== Federal judicial service ==
On April 11, 1893, United States President Grover Cleveland nominated Bellinger to serve on the United States District Court for the District of Oregon as the Judge of the single judge court, replacing Judge Matthew Deady who had died. Bellinger was confirmed in the position by the United States Senate on April 15, 1893 and received his commission the same day. He served as Judge of the federal district court until his death on May 12, 1905, in Portland, Oregon.

== Family and later life ==
Charles Bellinger was married to Margaret (or Margery) Serena Johnson of Linn County, Oregon, with whom he would have seven children. In his later years he taught at the University of Oregon School of Law when it was located in Portland. Also in Portland he was a commissioner of the Lewis and Clark Centennial Exposition held there in 1905 after his death, and as President of the Oregon State Bar. Bellinger organized the Portland Cremation Association, was a member of the Oregon Historical Society, and a regent of the University of Oregon. His ashes were interred at Portland Memorial Mausoleum.

== Works authored ==
- The Codes and Statutes of Oregon: Showing All Laws of a General Nature, Including the Session Laws of 1901 (Volume 1).

Legal offices
Preceded by Matthew Deady	Judge of the United States District Court for the District of Oregon; 1893–1905	Succeeded by Charles E. Wolverton
