= Harry H. Belt =

American judge (1883–1950)

28th Chief Justice of the Oregon Supreme Court
- In office 1945–1947
- Preceded by: John O. Bailey
- Succeeded by: George Rossman

55th Justice of the Oregon Supreme Court
- In office 1925–1950
- Preceded by: Martin L. Pipes
- Succeeded by: Harold J. Warner

Personal details
- Born: November 24, 1883 Salem, Oregon
- Died: April 6, 1950 (aged 66)
- Spouse: Martha Paldanius

Harry Hackleman Belt (November 24, 1883 – April 6, 1950) was an American educator, lawyer, and judge in the state of Oregon. He was the 28th Chief Justice of the Oregon Supreme Court starting in 1945. He served as chief justice for two years. Belt served on the bench for twenty-five years overall.

== Early life and education ==
Belt’s father John D. Belt traveled to Oregon from Missouri in 1853, settling in Salem. There John married Nellie Hackleman, who gave birth to Harry in 1883. As a child the family moved to nearby Dallas where Harry Belt attended the local schools. Later he attended Dallas Academy before starting college at the state normal school in Monmouth. There he graduated in 1903, from what is now Western Oregon University. After college he taught school for three years and was then elected as superintendent of schools for Yamhill County, Oregon in 1906. On July 3, 1905, Harry married Martha Paldanius. They had three children, George L., Barbara, and Myra.

While serving in that position he studied law for four years. He was taught by his uncle George H. Burnett who later served as chief justice on the Oregon Supreme Court. Belt then passed the bar in 1910. After passing the bar he joined Oscar Hayter’s firm in Dallas. Belt was a member of several fraternal organizations including the Freemasons, Odd Fellows, and the Elks.

== Judicial career ==
In 1914, Harry Belt was elected as a county circuit court judge and maintained that position until 1924. He was the youngest person ever elected to the circuit court in Oregon and won re-election unopposed in 1920. His district included Yamhill and Polk Counties. Then in the fall of 1924 he was elected to Oregon’s high court to replace Martin L. Pipes who had been serving out the remainder of John McCourt’s term as McCourt had died in office. He served briefly with his uncle Burnett, until Burnett died in office in 1927. Belt was re-elected in 1930, 1936, 1942 and 1948. From 1945 to 1947 he was selected by the other members of the supreme court to serve as chief justice. Belt died in office on August 6, 1950.

=== Opinions authored ===
- Luscher v. Reynolds, 153 OR 625, 56 P.2d 1158 (1936) (public ownership of land)
- State ex rel. Van Winkle v. Gilmore, 122 OR 19, 257 P. 21 (1927) (municipal corporations)
