= Henry L. Benson =

American judge

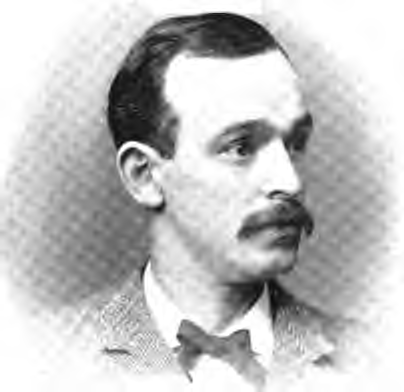
- Benson circa 1896

44th Justice of the Oregon Supreme Court
- In office 1915–1921
- Preceded by: Charles L. McNary
- Succeeded by: John L. Rand

Personal details
- Born: July 6, 1854 Stockton, California, United States
- Died: October 16, 1921 (aged 67) Oregon, United States
- Spouse: Susie E. Dougherty

Henry Lamdin Benson (July 6, 1854 – October 16, 1921) was an American politician and jurist in the state of Oregon. He was the 44th justice of the Oregon Supreme Court, serving from 1915 to 1921 on the state's highest court. He was chosen as Speaker of the Oregon House of Representatives for the 1897 regular session of the 19th Oregon Legislative Assembly, but a dispute between two rival factions in the House prevented the body from organizing for that session. (E. J. Davis was chosen as Speaker by the other faction.) Henry's younger brother was Oregon Governor Frank W. Benson.

== Early life ==
Henry Benson was born in Stockton, California on July 6, 1854. Benson was born to Matilda Williamson Benson and Henry Clark Benson. By 1858 the family was living in San Jose, California, where his brother Frank was born. The family later moved to Portland, Oregon where the younger Henry was educated in Portland schools and at Portland Academy. However, for college he returned to California where he earned a degree in 1873 from the College of the Pacific in San Jose. Three years later he was admitted to practice law in California. That same year he married Susie E. Dougherty, with whom he would have six children. Then in 1880 he returned to Oregon where he became the principal of the Drain Normal School before later serving as the superintendent of schools for Grants Pass, Oregon. In 1886, he passed the Oregon bar and practiced in Salem until 1891 when he went back to Grants Pass.

== Political career ==
In 1892, he was selected as the district attorney for a large portion of southwestern Oregon. Then in 1896 he was elected to the Oregon House of Representatives as a Republican representing Josephine County. During the 1897 legislature he was selected as Speaker of the House, but he was only selected by one faction of the house during a House session where the House never officially organized nor conducted any official business. Then from 1898 to 1907 Benson served as a circuit court judge in southwestern Oregon counties.

In 1914, Henry Benson ran for a position on the Oregon Supreme Court held by Charles L. McNary. Benson won by a single vote. He then started his six-year term in 1915 and won re-election in 1920. Henry L. Benson then died in office on October 16, 1921.

== Other ==
The Judge Henry L. Benson House in Klamath Falls is listed on the National Register of Historic Places. Benson moved to Klamath Falls in 1898 to comply with requirement that one of two judges of the four-county circuit court district live east of the Cascades. He was re-elected to the circuit court in 1904 and served until 1915 when he became a state supreme court justice.
