= Earl C. Latourette =

American judge (1889–1956)

32nd Chief Justice of the Oregon Supreme Court
- In office 1953–1955
- Preceded by: James T. Brand
- Succeeded by: Harold J. Warner

64th Justice of the Oregon Supreme Court
- In office 1950–1956
- Appointed by: Douglas McKay
- Preceded by: E. M. Page
- Succeeded by: William M. McAllister

Personal details
- Born: Earl Cornelius Latourette; February 10, 1889 Oregon City, Oregon
- Died: August 18, 1956 (aged 67)
- Spouse: Eleanor Marshall Latourette

Earl Cornelius Latourette (February 10, 1889 – August 18, 1956) was the 32nd Chief Justice of the Oregon Supreme Court and a Clackamas County Circuit Court judge. He served as chief justice for two years and died while still in office as a justice in 1956.

== Early life ==
Latourette was born in Oregon City, Oregon, on February 10, 1889, to Charles David Latourette and his wife Sedonia Bird Shaw Latourette. Both parents were pioneer settlers to Oregon. He had three brothers; Mortimer Dillon, Howard Fenton, and John Randolph.

The LaTourette family were French Huguenots who fled persecution and settled in Staten Island, New York in the late 1600s. Family members began moving westward in the 1800s, settling in St. Louis and Michigan. In 1879 LaTourette's father moved from Michigan to Oregon City to form a law partnership with his cousin, Dewitt Clinton Latourette.

LaTourette attended the University of Oregon, where he was on the football and track teams. He was the starting quarterback of the 1910 Oregon football team and led the team to victory over arch-rival Oregon Agricultural College before suffering a knee injury in the final minute of play. He earned All-Northwest Honors for two seasons.

Following college, he enrolled at the University of Oregon School of Law, which at that time was located in Portland. He graduated in 1912, and then passed the bar in 1915. Latourette began practicing law in Oregon City after passing the bar, and remained in private practice until 1931.

== Judicial career ==
In 1931, he was appointed as a circuit court judge for Oregon’s 5th judicial district that included Clackamas County, holding that position until 1950. During his time on the bench he lived in Oregon City, and in 1936 attended the funeral of fellow judge John Hugh McNary. Then on January 19, 1950 Oregon Governor Douglas McKay appointed Latourette to replace E. M. Page on the Oregon Supreme Court. Page had resigned from his position the day before, less than a year after he had been appointed to the court. Later that year Latourette won election to a full six-year term on the bench. Then in 1953 he was selected by his fellow justices to be Chief Justice, serving as Chief Justice until 1955. During this time as Chief Justice, future politician Norma Paulus clerked for him. Latourette encouraged her to attend law school, which she did at Willamette University College of Law. On August 18, 1956, Justice Earl Latourette died in office

== Family ==
On April 30, 1912, Earl C. Latourette married Ruth Steiwer of Fossil, Oregon. Ruth was the daughter of William H. Steiwer, and a member of a prominent political family from Eastern Oregon. The couple’s children included daughters Anne Latourette Cook, Jeanne Latourette Linklater and Earl C. "Neil" Latourette, Jr. (d. 1982). Earl C. later married Eleanor Marshall in 1949, and they did not have any children.

== Other ==
- The oldest house in Gearhart, Oregon belonged to the Latourette family beginning in 1926. Earl’s father Charles David Latourette later had his two sons Earl and brother John flip a coin to determine who would inherit the property with John winning the coin toss.
- Justice Latourette donated the land in Oregon City where the Clackamas County Historical Society’s museum is located.
