= Arthur D. Hay =

American judge

62nd Justice of the Oregon Supreme Court
- In office November 28, 1942 – December 19, 1952
- Appointed by: Charles A. Sprague
- Preceded by: John L. Rand
- Succeeded by: William C. Perry

Personal details
- Born: October 24, 1884 Peterhead, Scotland
- Died: December 19, 1952 (aged 68) Salem, Oregon, U.S.
- Spouse: Edith M. Lawson
- Children: Margaret B. Hay, John R. Hay, Douglas L. Hay

Arthur Douglas Hay (October 24, 1884 – December 19, 1952) was an American attorney and judge in Oregon. He was the 62nd justice of the Oregon Supreme Court, serving from 1942 to 1952. Prior to his appointment to the state's highest court, Hay served as a state circuit court judge.

== Early life ==
Arthur Hay was born in Peterhead, Scotland on October 24, 1884. He received his primary education at local schools in Edinburgh before immigrating to the United States through New York City in 1906. Two years later he moved to Oregon where he enrolled at the University of Oregon School of Law. There he earned an LL.B. degree in 1911.

== Legal career ==
After graduation Hay moved to Portland, Oregon where he practiced law until 1912 when he relocated to Southern Oregon and Klamath Falls. In 1914, he married Edith M. Lawson, with whom he had three children together. In 1915, they moved to neighboring Lakeview, Oregon, the county seat of Lake County. There in 1925 Arthur Hay became the district attorney for the county, serving through the next year. In 1933 Hay was appointed as state circuit court judge, and was twice re-elected.

On November 28, 1942, he was appointed by Oregon Governor Charles A. Sprague to the Oregon Supreme Court to replace John L. Rand who had died in office. Hay won election to a full six-year term on the court in 1944 with re-election to another term in 1950. However, he did not finish the term and died in office on December 19, 1952.

== Other Notes ==
Fremont/Hay Elementary School, part of Lake County School District, is named after Hay and John C Fremont. As of June 2016, Fremont School housed grades K-3; Hay School, a separate building, housed grades 4–6.
