= Arno H. Denecke =

American judge

37th Chief Justice of the Oregon Supreme Court
- In office 1976–1982
- Preceded by: Kenneth J. O'Connell
- Succeeded by: Berkeley Lent

73rd Justice of the Oregon Supreme Court
- In office 1963–1982
- Preceded by: Harold J. Warner
- Succeeded by: Wallace P. Carson, Jr.

Personal details
- Born: May 7, 1916 Rock Island, Illinois, U.S.
- Died: October 20, 1993 (aged 77) Salem, Oregon, U.S.
- Spouse(s): Selma Denecke, Marguerite L. Gahr

Arno Harry Denecke (May 7, 1916 – October 20, 1993) was an American jurist who was the 37th Chief Justice of the Oregon Supreme Court from 1976 to 1982, having been on the court since 1963. A veteran of World War II, he retired from the United States Army at the rank of colonel in 1974.

== Early life ==
Denecke was born May 7, 1916, in Rock Island, Illinois. In 1939, he graduated from the University of Illinois College of Law and then went to work for Montgomery Ward from 1939 to 1941 in both Chicago and Oakland, California.. With the outbreak of World War II, Denecke joined the United States Army and served with the 70th Infantry Division from 1941 to 1945, then in the U.S. Army Reserve, retiring as a colonel in 1974. In 1945, Arno was married to Selma Jane Rockey, of Portland, Oregon. They had five children, Ginger, David, Will, John, and Anne.

== Legal career ==
After the war, Denecke moved to Portland, Oregon, and joined the firm of Mautz, Souther, Spaulding, Denecke & Kinsey (now Schwabe, Williamson, Wyatt). While in private practice Denecke argued in front of the U.S. Supreme Court as attorney for Ross Island Sand & Gravel in a worker's compensation case, Hahn v. Ross Island Sand & Gravel Co., 358 U.S. 272 (1959). During this time he served as a member of the Portland School Board in the 1950s. Denecke left the firm in 1959 when he was appointed as circuit court judge for Multnomah County by Governor Mark Hatfield.

In 1983 he was a member of the American Bar Association Commission on Evaluation of Professional Standards that drafted the Model Rules of Professional Conduct. As an educator Arno Denecke taught at the University of Oregon School of Law, Northwestern School of Law, Army Judge Advocate General School, and Willamette University. In 1993, he was awarded the Oregon State Bar Association's Award of Merit.

Additionally, Denecke was a trustee for both the Oregon Graduate Center (now part of OHSU) and Reed College in Portland. He also served as chairperson for the YMCA Youth & Government program, and served as an overseer to Lewis & Clark College.

== Judicial career ==
In 1962, Arno Denecke was elected to the Oregon Supreme Court. He started in 1963 and was re-elected in 1968, 1974, and 1980. Denecke was selected as chief justice in 1976, and served in that capacity until he resigned from the bench on June 30, 1982. While on the bench he wrote many opinions, including Seattle-First National Bank v. Oregon Pacific Industries, 262 Or. 578, 500 P.2d 1033 (1972) and Gustafson v. Payless, 269 Or. 354, 525 P.2d 118 (1974). As chief justice he was involved with reforms of the court that centralized many administrative tasks under that position.

== Later years and family ==
After leaving the court he was an advocate for school reforms and led an investigation of Oregon's State Accident Insurance Fund. Denecke was married to Marguerite L. Gahr. He had two stepchildren, Michael Potter and Shirley Potter. He had 3 children with longtime wife Selma. Arno Denecke died on October 20, 1993, in Salem, Oregon, at the age of 77. The Marion County Bar Association gives the Arno Denecke Award annually to attorneys for pro bono work.

== Publications ==
- Author of, The Judiciary Needs Your Help Teachers, 22 J. LEGAL EDUC. 197, 203 (1969).
