= William C. Perry =

American judge

- Perry in 1969

34th Chief Justice of the Oregon Supreme Court
- In office 1957-1959; 1967-1970
- Preceded by: Harold J. Warner, William M. McAllister
- Succeeded by: Kenneth J. O'Connell, William M. McAllister

67th Justice of the Oregon Supreme Court
- In office 1952–1970
- Appointed by: Douglas McKay
- Preceded by: Arthur D. Hay
- Succeeded by: Edward H. Howell

Personal details
- Born: March 11, 1900 Belleville, Kansas
- Died: October 27, 1985 (aged 85) Chula Vista, California
- Spouse: Enola

William C. Perry (March 11, 1900 – October 27, 1985) was an American attorney and jurist in Oregon. He was the 34th Chief Justice of the Oregon Supreme Court. He served in that role twice for a total of five years. Perry was appointed to the court by soon to be ex-governor Douglas McKay after McKay had already appointed him as a county circuit court judge. A native of Kansas, he also worked as a county prosecuting attorney and city attorney prior to joining the state's highest court.

== Early life ==
William C. Perry was born on March 11, 1900, in Belleville, Kansas, where he then grew up before he served in the military during World War I. He graduated from the University of Kansas in Lawrence, Kansas, in 1922. There Perry was a member of the fraternity Phi Gamma Delta and earned both his undergraduate degree and a law degree. He married Enola Miller of Riley, Kansas in June 1924 at Salina, Kansas, and they had one son, William junior, and one daughter, JoAnne Kay (1930–1944). In Kansas, he worked for the county as a prosecutor, earning $75 per month. In 1937, the family moved to Pendleton, Oregon, where he served as the city's attorney from 1944 to 1950.

== Judicial career ==
Perry was appointed to the county court for Umatilla County in 1950 by Douglas McKay. On December 26, 1952, Oregon Governor McKay appointed Perry to the Oregon Supreme Court to fill the vacancy created by the death of Arthur Hay, who had died on December 19. McKay resigned as governor the following day. Then in 1954 Perry won election to a full six-year term followed by re-election in 1960 and 1966. During his tenure on Oregon's highest court, he was selected to serve as chief justice twice. First in 1957 until 1959, and then from 1967 to 1970. Justice Perry then resigned from the court on June 1, 1970. After leaving the bench he criticized the Supreme Court of the United States for their decisions regarding free lawyers for defendants and the one person one vote principle.

== Other ==
One of Justice Perry's law clerks while he was Chief Justice was Jack Gore Collins, who later was the assistant U.S. Attorney who signed the indictment for skyjacker D. B. Cooper just prior to the statute of limitations running out in 1976. Another clerk, Ken Morrow, was a high-profile defense attorney in Oregon.

After retiring from the bench, Perry served as Chair of the Natural Resources section at the House of Delegates for the American Bar Association in 1974. William C. Perry died in Chula Vista, California, on October 27, 1985, at the age of 85 years.

== Decisions authored ==
- State v. Edwards, 243 Or. 440, 412 P.2d 526 (1996) (sodomy)
