= Lawrence T. Harris =

American judge

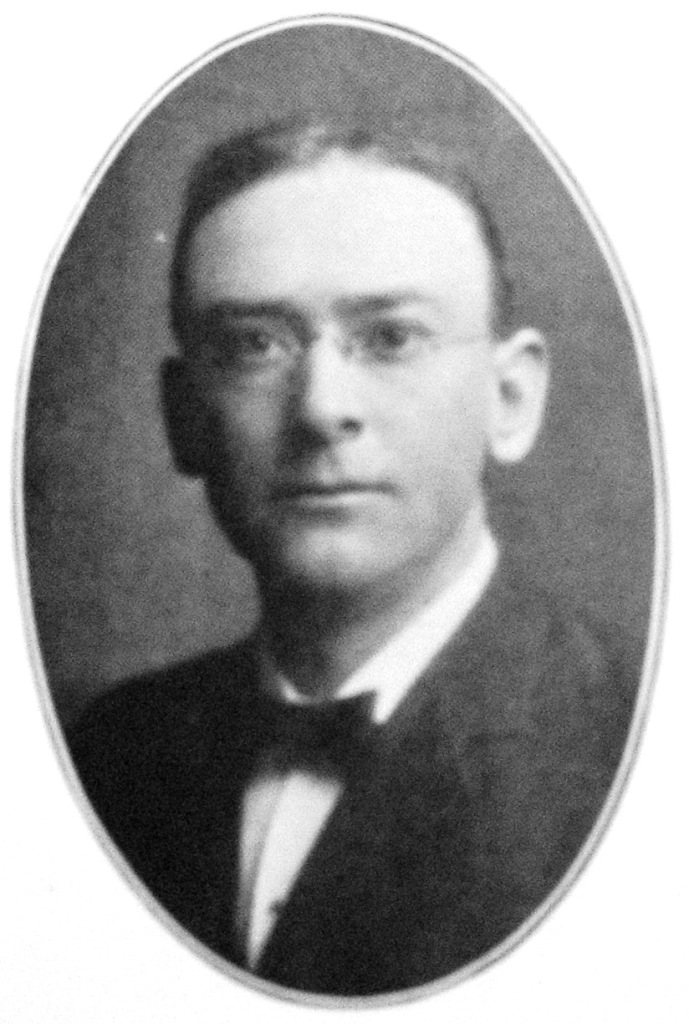
- Lawrence circa 1910

45th Justice of the Oregon Supreme Court
- In office 1915–1924
- Preceded by: William Marion Ramsey
- Succeeded by: Oliver P. Coshow

21st Speaker of the Oregon House of Representatives
- In office 1903
- Preceded by: Levi Branson Reeder
- Succeeded by: A. L. Mills

Personal details
- Born: September 13, 1873 Albany, Oregon, U.S.
- Died: January 21, 1960 (aged 86) Eugene, Oregon, U.S.
- Party: Republican
- Spouse: Jennie B. Beattie

Lawrence T. Harris (September 13, 1873 – January 21, 1960) was an American politician and lawyer in the state of Oregon. He was the 45th justice of the Oregon Supreme Court, serving from 1914 to 1924. An a native Oregonian, he also served as a state court judge and in 1903 was the Speaker of the Oregon House of Representatives. After leaving the state's highest court he returned to private practice in Eugene, Oregon.

== Early life ==
Lawrence Harris was born on September 13, 1873, in Oregon’s Willamette Valley in Albany, Oregon. He received his primary education in the local public schools before attending the University of Oregon in Eugene. At the University of Oregon he earned two degrees, first with a bachelor's degree in arts and letters in 1893. Then in 1896 he was awarded his master's degree in the same subject. Harris completed his education with an LLB from the University of Michigan in 1896.

== Legal career ==
Lawrence Harris then passed the bar and began practicing law in Eugene and Albany in Oregon. In 1901 Harris was elected as a Republican to represent Eugene in the Oregon House of Representatives. In 1903, he was reelected to the House where he was selected as Speaker of the House. Then in 1905 Harris was appointed as judge to Oregon’s 2nd Judicial District. On that court he then won re-election and continued to serve until 1914.

In the 1914 general election Harris was elected to the Oregon Supreme Court, replacing William Marion Ramsey on the court. He won re-election to a second six-year term in 1920, and then resigned from the bench on January 15, 1924.

=== Works authored ===
Harris wrote several articles on the history of Oregon’s judicial department. In 1922 his History of the Oregon Code (1 Or. L. Rev.) was published in the Oregon Law Review while in 1938 his A History of the Judiciary of Oregon was published in the Oregon Supreme Court Record.

== Family and later life ==
In 1904 Lawrence Harris was married to Jennie B. Beattie. In 1959 he was awarded the UO Distinguished Service Award for UO Faculty from his alma mater. After leaving the court, he returned to private practice in Eugene and served on the bar examiner's board for Oregon. Harris died in Eugene on January 21, 1960, after a long illness at the age of 86.
