= Harold J. Warner =

American judge

33rd Chief Justice of the Oregon Supreme Court
- In office 1955–1957
- Preceded by: Earl C. Latourette
- Succeeded by: William C. Perry

65th Justice of the Oregon Supreme Court
- In office 1950–1963
- Appointed by: Douglas McKay
- Preceded by: Harry H. Belt
- Succeeded by: Arno H. Denecke

Personal details
- Born: November 6, 1890 Fort Wayne, Indiana, U.S.
- Died: December 23, 1982 (aged 92) Portland, Oregon, U.S.
- Spouse: Aluta M. Larsen

Harold Johnson Warner (November 6, 1890 – December 23, 1982) was an American attorney and judge in Oregon. He was the 33rd Chief Justice of the Oregon Supreme Court. Warner served on the court from 1950 to 1963, including two years as chief justice. A native of Indiana, Warner was a veteran of both World War I and World War II.

== Early life ==
Warner was born on November 6, 1890, in Fort Wayne, Indiana. At a young age the family moved to Oregon and Harold was educated in Pendleton, Oregon, in the local public schools. Warner then attended the University of Oregon where he enrolled in 1909. Warner graduated in 1913, and then earned a doctorate in laws in 1916 at the University of Oregon School of Law.

Warner then served in World War I. After the war he entered private law practice in Pendleton. In 1925, he married Aluta M. Larsen, and they had two children. From 1920 to 1922 he served as that city's attorney before moving to Portland, Oregon, in 1934.

In 1928, he was a presidential elector, casting his vote for Herbert Hoover as a Republican. From 1933 until 1935, Warner was a commander in the American Legion. Warner again served in the armed forces during World War II.

== Judicial career ==
On September 5, 1950, Harold Warner was appointed to the Oregon Supreme Court by Oregon Governor Douglas McKay. He was selected to replace Harry Belt who had died on August 6, 1950.

Later in 1950, justice Warner was elected to a full six-year term on Oregon’s highest court. Beginning in 1955 and lasting until 1957, he was chief justice. In 1956 Chief Justice Warner won re-election for another term. His term ended in 1963 and he retired from the court with future Chief Justice Arno Denecke winning Warner's seat in the November election. Warner died in Portland on December 23, 1982, at the age of 92.
