= George M. Brown (judge) =

American judge

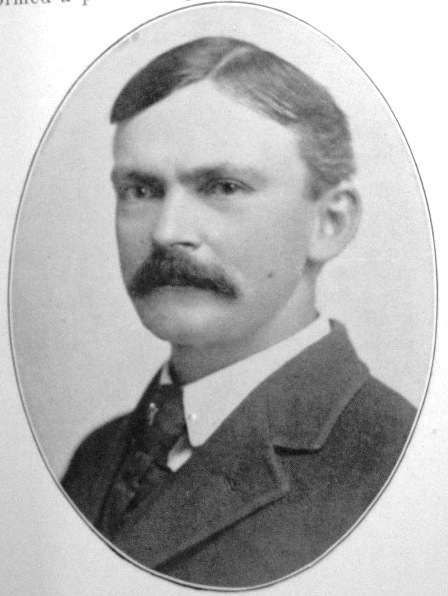
- Brown circa 1910

50th Justice of the Oregon Supreme Court
- In office 1920–1933
- Appointed by: Ben W. Olcott
- Preceded by: Alfred S. Bennett
- Succeeded by: John O. Bailey

5th Oregon Attorney General
- In office January 4, 1915 – October 14, 1920
- Governor: James Withycombe; Ben W. Olcott
- Preceded by: Andrew M. Crawford
- Succeeded by: Isaac H. Van Winkle

Personal details
- Born: May 5, 1864 Douglas County, Oregon
- Died: June 18, 1934 (aged 70) Oregon
- Party: Republican
- Spouse: Bertha Bellows

George M. Brown (May 5, 1864 – June 18, 1934) was an American attorney and judge in the state of Oregon. He was the 50th justice of the Oregon Supreme Court and the 5th attorney general of the state from 1915 to 1920. An Oregon born and educated attorney, he previously worked as a district attorney in Southern Oregon.

== Early life ==
George Brown was born on May 5, 1864, in Southern Oregon’s Douglas County. His parents Thomas Brown and Sarah Flett Brown immigrated to Oregon Country in 1847. In Oregon, George was educated in the local schools before attending and graduating from Umpqua Academy in 1883. He then went on to Willamette University in Salem, Oregon, where he graduated in 1885. After reading law in Salem, Brown passed the bar in 1891.

== Legal career ==
From 1894 until 1896 George Brown was the district attorney for Oregon’s 2nd district while headquartered in Roseburg. He was then reelected and continued in that position until 1908. In 1914, Brown was elected as Oregon's Attorney General as a Republican with his term beginning on January 4, 1915. In this role he represented the state along with John O. Bailey in the United States Supreme Court case of Bunting v. Oregon that upheld an Oregon law in a landmark decision regulating the maximum number of hours an employer could work an employee. He was reelected in 1918 and continued as attorney general until October 14, 1920, when he resigned the position.

Also on October 14, Oregon Governor Ben W. Olcott appointed Brown to the state supreme court bench after Alfred S. Bennett resigned from the court. That same year he won election to a full six-year term on the bench. In 1926, Brown won reelection and then left the court at the end of that term in 1933.

== Family ==
In 1895 Brown married Bertha Bellows. The Browns had three children. George M. Brown died on June 18, 1934, at the age of 70.

Legal offices
| Preceded by Andrew M. Crawford | Attorney General of Oregon; 1915–1920 | Succeeded by Isaac H. Van Winkle |
