= David Howitt (entrepreneur) =

American business consultant (born 1968)

- Born: August 8, 1968 (age 58); East Grand Rapids, Michigan
- Education: Denison University
- Occupations: Businessman, business consultant, founder and ceo of meriwether group
- Spouse: Heather Howitt
- Website: https://meriwethergroup.com

David Marc Howitt (born August 8, 1968) is an American business consultant. He is the founder and CEO of Meriwether Group and his spouse, Heather Howitt, was co-founder of Oregon Chai. He has provided business advice to various companies. Howitt was recognized by the Portland Business Journal as one of the 40 most influential business leaders under the age of 40

== Early life ==
Howitt was born in East Grand Rapids, Michigan and is the eldest child of Dennis W. Howitt and Leslie C. Vandenhoot. Howitt received his education at Lakeside Elementary School and East Grand Rapids Middle School. He then attended East Grand Rapids High School, where he was an all state football player. He graduated with academic and athletic honors in 1986. Following high school, David attended Denison University in Granville, Ohio where he received a bachelor of arts, a major in Political Science and minor in Philosophy.

He completed a one-year Law Clerk internship at Winston & Strawn in Chicago following Denison before moving to Portland, Oregon to attend Lewis & Clark Northwestern School of Law. He was listed there on the Moot Court Honor Board. He passed the Bar and received his J.D & Certificate in Environmental and Natural Resource Law in 1994.

== Career ==
Following Law School, Howitt took a position as an Associate Attorney for Schwabe, Williamson & Wyatt in downtown Portland and later as Corporate Counsel for adidas America. Later he served as Vice President of Licensing and Business Development, overseeing a licensing portfolio and arranging acquisitions for several companies, including TaylorMade and Salomon.

In 1994, Howitt's spouse, Heather Howitt, co-founded Oregon Chai, a company which sold tea. In 2004, Heather sold the company, and David then founded Meriwether Group (MWG), an advisory and business acceleration firm. Meriwether consists of entrepreneurs, corporate executives and lawyers, (Perkins Coie, Schwabe Wiliamson and Wyatt). The Meriwether Group members advise companies about licensing, distribution, brand development, as well as mergers and acquisitions.

Howitt is author of the book, Heed Your Call published by Simon & Schuster in 2014 and founder of the Heed Your Call – Fulfill Your Journey Entrepreneurship Program. In 2014 he was invited to speak about his book on Good Morning America. He spoke at TEDxHollywood in August 2014.

== Community ==
Howitt served as Chair of the Pacific Environmental Advocacy Center from 2009 – 2013. He also served on the board of The Freshwater Trust, beginning in 2004, the Portland Parks Foundation, 2005 – 2007, and Waterwatch of Oregon, 2004 – 2006.

== Recognitions ==
- 2007– Forty Under 40 by Portland Business Journal
- 2008– 20 People To Watch in 2008 by Portland Business Journal
- 2015– Denison University Alumni Citation
