= Levi Branson Reeder =

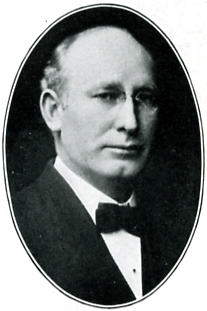
- Reeder circa 1910

20th Speaker of the Oregon House of Representatives
- In office 1901–1903
- Preceded by: E. V. Carter
- Succeeded by: Lawrence T. Harris

Personal details
- Born: September 7, 1865 Eureka, Illinois
- Died: January 26, 1930 (aged 64) Portland, Oregon
- Party: Republican
- Spouse: Laura L. Zeigler

Levi Branson "Lee" Reeder (September 7, 1865 – January 26, 1930) was an attorney and Republican politician from Pendleton in the US state of Oregon. A native of Illinois, he served as Speaker of the Oregon House of Representatives from 1901–1903.

== Early life ==
Levi Reeder was born in Eureka, Woodford County, Illinois, to Daniel A. and Eliza Reeder (née Kelsay) on September 7, 1865. At the age of nine the family immigrated to Oregon, settling in Eastern Oregon. Reeder attended school in Athena and Weston before enrolling in college at Christian College (now Western Oregon University) in Monmouth. He graduated with a Bachelor of Science degree in 1887, and then earned a B.S.D. degree at the institution. On July 3, 1890, he married Laura L. Zeigler. After a year of course work and the University of Michigan, Reeder then earned a Bachelor of Laws degree from the school in 1891. He was admitted to the bar in Washington on August 1, 1891.

== Career ==
After passing the bar, Reeder entered private legal practice in Stevens County, Washington, remaining there until 1895. From 1893 to 1895 he served as a prosecuting attorney in the county. In 1895, he returned to Oregon where he passed the bar and began practicing in Pendleton until 1904. In 1898, Reeder was elected as a Republican to the Oregon House of Representatives from Umatilla County. He was re-elected in 1900, and served as the Speaker of the Oregon House during the 1901 legislative session. In 1904, Reeder relocated to Portland.

Reeder advocated for opening a shipping channel on the Columbia River from Pendleton to the Pacific Ocean. He died in Portland on January 26, 1930.
