= Oliver P. Coshow =

American judge

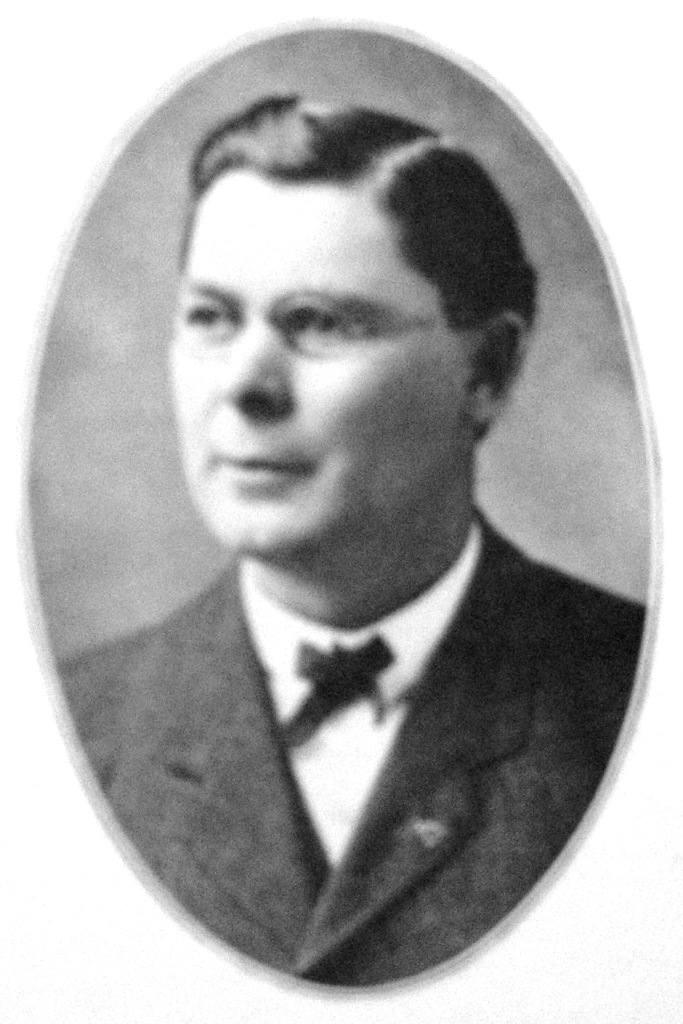
- Coshow circa 1910

23rd Chief Justice of the Oregon Supreme Court
- In office 1929–1931
- Preceded by: John L. Rand
- Succeeded by: Henry J. Bean

53rd Justice of the Oregon Supreme Court
- In office 1924–1931
- Preceded by: Lawrence T. Harris
- Succeeded by: James U. Campbell

Member of the Oregon State Senate
- In office 1905-1907

Personal details
- Born: August 14, 1863 Brownsville, Oregon
- Died: December 18, 1937 (aged 74)
- Spouse: Elizabeth Kay

Oliver Perry Coshow (August 14, 1863 – December 18, 1937) was an American attorney and politician in Oregon. He was the 23rd Chief Justice of the Oregon Supreme Court, serving on Oregon's highest court from 1924 to 1931. The Oregon native earlier had served in the Oregon Legislative Assembly.

== Early life ==
Oliver Coshow was born on August 14, 1863, in Brownsville, Oregon to Oliver, Sr. and Sarah Cochran. His parents immigrated from Indiana in 1851. After receiving his primary education in the local schools he attended the University of Oregon in Eugene where he graduated in 1885. After graduation he worked in the retail filed in Roseburg, Oregon and Brownsville before studying law in Albany, Oregon.

== Legal career ==
After passing the state bar in 1890, Coshow began practicing law in Albany for two years before moving to McMinnville, Oregon, where he practiced from 1892 to 1897. He then moved back to Roseburg where he was in private practice from 1897 to 1924. During this time he was elected as a Democrat to the state senate representing Douglas County, serving from 1905 through the 1907 legislature.

On January 15, 1924, Oliver Coshow was appointed by Oregon Governor Walter M. Pierce to replace justice Lawrence T. Harris on the Oregon Supreme Court after Harris resigned his position. Coshow then won a full six-year term in 1924 and his term ended without re-election. While on the court he served as chief justice from 1929 to 1931.

== Family ==
On December 25, 1886, Coshow married Elizabeth Kay of Salem. and they had four daughters together.
