= Schwabe, Williamson & Wyatt =

- Headquarters: Portland, Oregon
- No. of attorneys: 175
- Major practice areas: · Business and Corporate · Employment · Labor and Benefits · Environmental Regulation and Litigation · Indian Law · Intellectual Property · Litigation and Dispute Resolution · Privacy and Data Security · Real Estate · Tax
- Key people: Graciela Gomez Cowger, CEO
- Date founded: 1892
- Founder: Ralph W. Wilber
- Website: Schwabe, Williamson & Wyatt

Schwabe, Williamson & Wyatt ("Schwabe") is an American law firm with over 176 attorneys in eight cities on the West Coast. The firm is led by Graciela Gomez Cowger, CEO.

== History ==
The firm was founded in 1892 by Ralph Wilber and Schuyler C. Spencer, the latter handled the estate of railroad promoter Thomas Egenton Hogg. In 1947, the firm was known as Mautz, Souther, Spaulding, Denecke & Kinsey when Arno H. Denecke joined the firm. Namesake John L. Schwabe joined the firm about 1952, with later congressman Wendell Wyatt joining the firm. In 2012, the firm was sued for malpractice relating to a sale involving Golden Temple Inc., with damages claimed of $230 million. The firm made Graciela Gomez Cowger its first CEO in 2017. Horenstein Law Group merged into the firm in 2022.

== Details ==
Based in Portland, Oregon, Schwabe, Williamson & Wyatt is the seventh largest law firm in the Pacific Northwest. The firm is the second largest in Oregon with 176 attorneys, with the headquarters in the PacWest Center in Downtown Portland. As of 2018, it is also the second largest in the Portland metropolitan area with approximately 108 attorneys and 160 staff members.

The law firm has an industry focus in key sectors, including healthcare, technology, ports and maritime, among others. It has offices in Washington state in Seattle and Vancouver, in Oregon in Portland, Bend, Salem, and Eugene, as well as in Mountain View, California, and Anchorage, Alaska.

== Notable people ==
- Arno H. Denecke, former justice on the Oregon Supreme Court
- Jack Faust (attorney), attorney and television personality
- W. Michael Gillette, former justice on the Oregon Supreme Court
- David Howitt, attorney
- Ron Saxton, attorney and Republican politician in Oregon
- Wendell Wyatt, attorney and Congressman
