= Bela S. Huntington =

American politician (1858–1934)

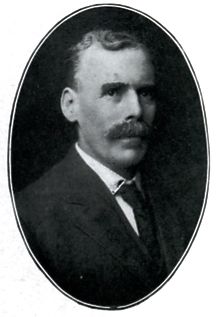

Member of the Oregon House of Representatives from the 47th district
- In office 1897–1898

Personal details
- Born: February 5, 1858 Rockford, Illinois
- Died: October 10, 1934 (aged 76)
- Party: Republican
- Spouse(s): Helen May Wilson; Maude S. Hendryx
- Children: Wilson Bela Huntington; Irving Curtis Huntington
- Education: University of Michigan
- Occupation: attorney

Bela Shaw Huntington (February 5, 1858 – October 10, 1934) was an attorney and politician from the U.S. state of Oregon. A native of Illinois, he was educated in Vermont and later moved to Oregon where he was an attorney in The Dalles. Huntington was a Republican and served in the Oregon House of Representatives.

== Early life ==
Bela Huntington was born in Rockford, Illinois, on February 5, 1858, the son of Charles A. and Lucretia Atwood (née Waterman) Huntington. He lived at St. Johnsbury, Vermont, from 1864 to 1867, and then Olympia, Washington, from 1867 to 1875. He received his early education at the St. Johnsbury Academy from 1875 until 1878. Huntington attended the University of Vermont from 1878 to 1882 and earned a bachelor's degree. From 1882 to 1883 he attended the University of Michigan Law School, and was admitted to the bar in Michigan in 1883. He then moved to Oregon that year and entered private legal practice. Huntington earned a master's degree from Vermont in 1885. On February 2, 1887, he married Helen May Wilson, and they had two children, Wilson Bela Huntington Irving Curtis Huntington.

== Legal career ==
He entered into partnership with F. P. Mays under the firm name of Mays & Huntington between 1886 and 1890. Later, until 1909 he practiced with H. S. Wilson in The Dalles. In September 1909, he moved to Portland, Oregon. He was the president of the McKinley Club between 1892 and 1894, and he was chairman of the Republicans' county committee. He was the Republican nominee for the Oregon House of Representatives for Wasco and Gilliam counties and was elected to a single two-year term in 1897. He represented District 47, but the House failed to organize that year, and Huntington did not return for the 1898 special session. He never served again in the Oregon Legislature.

== Later life and death ==
Huntington's wife Helen died on September 30, 1923, and he remarried on October 23, 1928, to Maude S. Hendryx. Bela Shaw Huntington died on October 10, 1934, at the age of 76.
