= E. V. Carter =

American politician

Speaker of the Oregon House of Representatives
- In office 1898–1901
- Preceded by: Charles B. Moores
- Succeeded by: Levi Branson Reeder

Personal details
- Born: Ernest Victor Carter; October 13, 1860 Elkader, Iowa, U.S.
- Died: January 3, 1933 (aged 72) Ashland, Oregon, U.S.
- Party: Republican
- Profession: banker

Ernest Victor Carter (October 13, 1860 – January 3, 1933) was an American politician who served in the Oregon House of Representatives. He was chosen as Speaker of that body from 1898 to 1901. He was the son of Henry B. Carter, a businessman and banker from Iowa and former member of the Iowa State Senate and namesake of the Carter House in Ashland, Oregon which is listed on the National Register of Historic Places.
