= Oregon Chai =

American beverage company

Oregon Chai is an American beverage company based in Portland, Oregon. The company provides a line of chai beverage products, including a concentrate designed to make a hot, tea-based beverage prepared with steamed milk, vanilla, a sweetener (usually sugar or honey), and other spices.

== Company ==
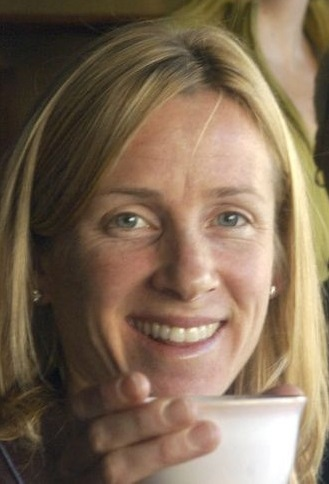
Heather Hewitt with chai

The company was co-founded in 1994 by Heather Howitt, Tedde McMillen, Carla Powell, Brian Ross and Lori Spencer, selling to local cafés. Sales in 1996 rose by 469%, and by 2000 sales were over $15 million, including export abroad to countries including Saudi Arabia.

The company was purchased in 2004 by Kerry Group, a giant Irish food conglomerate. Its offices were moved to Waukesha, Wisconsin, in 2005.
