= George H. Burnett =

American judge

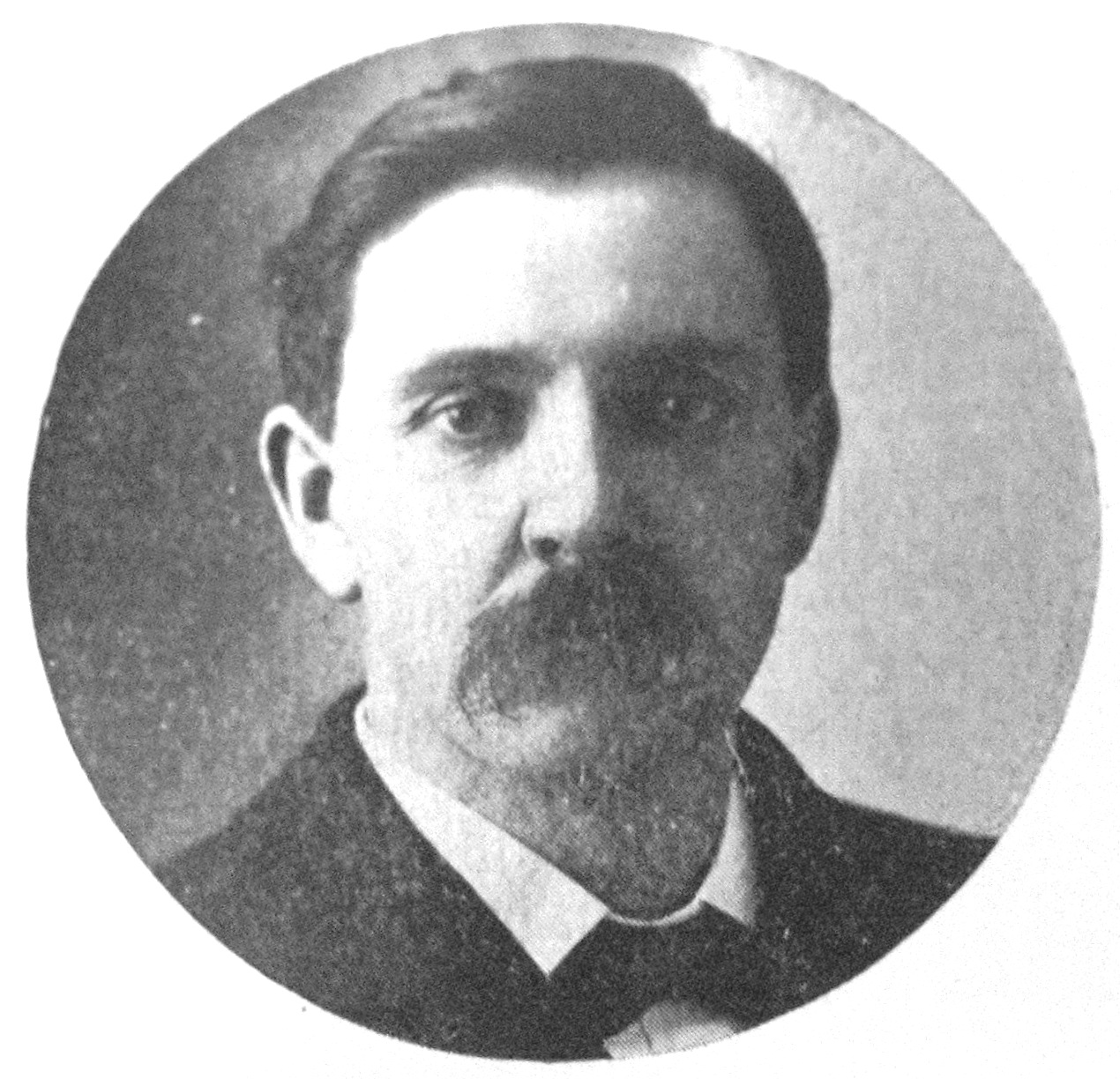
- Burnett in 1903

21st Chief Justice of the Oregon Supreme Court
- In office 1927
- Preceded by: Thomas A. McBride
- Succeeded by: John L. Rand
- In office 1921–1923
- Preceded by: Thomas A. McBride
- Succeeded by: Thomas A. McBride

41st Justice of the Oregon Supreme Court
- In office 1911–1927
- Preceded by: Woodson T. Slater
- Succeeded by: George Rossman

Personal details
- Born: May 9, 1853 Yamhill County, Oregon, U.S.
- Died: September 10, 1927 (aged 74) Salem, Oregon, U.S.
- Spouse(s): Marian Belt (d. 1924), Frances Wise

George Henry Burnett (May 9, 1853 – September 10, 1927) was an American attorney and judge in the state of Oregon. He was the 21st chief justice of the Oregon Supreme Court serving twice as chief first in 1921 to 1923, and then in 1927 when he died in office. Overall he served on Oregon’s highest court from 1911 until 1927.

== Early life ==
George Burnett was born in Yamhill County, Oregon on May 9, 1853, as the son of George W. and Sidney Younger. His parents had immigrated to Oregon over the Oregon Trail in 1846. George junior attended public schools in Yamhill County before starting his college education at McMinnville College where he attended until 1871. He then enrolled at Christian College in Monmouth, Oregon where he graduated with a bachelor's degree of arts in June 1873. Burnett then moved to Salem, Oregon and began learning the law in 1873 from Rufus Mallory and J. J. Shaw at their law practice. In December 1875 he was admitted to the Oregon bar.

== Legal career ==
Then in June 1876 Burnett was elected as district attorney for Oregon's third judicial district, serving until 1878. From that year until 1886 he partnered with Shaw before opening his own practice where he worked from 1886 until 1892. In 1892, he was elected to the circuit court for the third district of Oregon where he stayed until 1910. During this time he was also a professor of medical jurisprudence at the Willamette University College of Medicine, and a law professor at Willamette's law school.

In 1910, George Burnett was elected to the Oregon Supreme Court to a new position when the court was expanded from three to five justices. He re-elected in 1916 and 1922. He served as chief justice of the state's high court from 1921 to 1923, and again in 1927 until his death on September 10, 1927. His nephew Harry H. Belt served with him on the court starting in 1925, whom George had taught the law to.

== Family ==
George married Marian Belt in 1879. She died in 1924, and he remarried in 1925 to Frances Wise.
