= Percy R. Kelly =

American judge

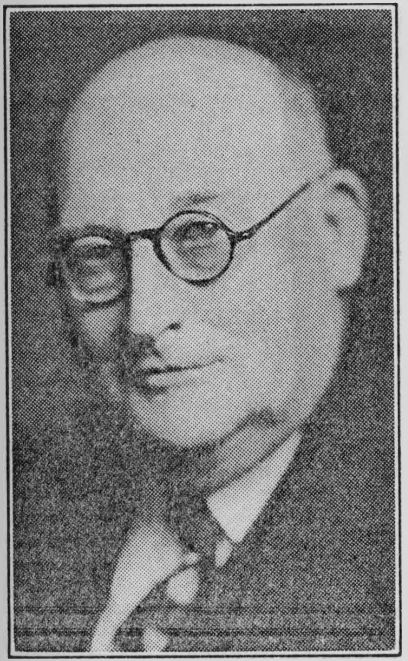
- Photo from the 1930 general election Oregon Voter's Guide

26th Chief Justice of the Oregon Supreme Court
- In office 1941–1943
- Preceded by: John L. Rand
- Succeeded by: John O. Bailey

57th Justice of the Oregon Supreme Court
- In office 1930–1949
- Preceded by: Thomas A. McBride
- Succeeded by: E. M. Page

Personal details
- Born: July 13, 1870 Arlington, Iowa
- Died: June 14, 1949 (aged 78)
- Spouse: Margaret Dawson Gillette

Percy R. Kelly (July 13, 1870 – June 14, 1949) was an American attorney and jurist in the state of Oregon. He was the 26th chief justice of the Oregon Supreme Court, serving on Oregon’s highest court from 1930 to 1949. Born in Iowa, Kelly was an attorney in Oregon and member of both chambers of the Oregon Legislative Assembly, as well as a trial court judge prior to joining the state supreme court.

== Early life ==
Percy Kelly was born on July 13, 1870, in Arlington, Iowa, to C.C. Kelly and the former Mary Whipple. After receiving his primary education in the local school of Iowa, California, and Oregon he attended Albany College in Albany, Oregon, where he graduated in 1887. After graduation he then read law under future Oregon Supreme Court justice Charles E. Wolverton and joined the bar in 1892.

== Legal career ==
After passing the bar, Kelly began practicing law in Albany. Beginning in 1894 he was a deputy district attorney, serving until 1900. Then in 1898 he was elected as a Republican to the state house representing Linn County, for a special session. Beginning with following legislature he served in the state senate for two sessions. After this he served as Albany’s city attorney in 1909 and then became a state circuit court judge serving from 1911 until 1930.

On September 24, 1930, Kelly was appointed by Oregon Governor A. W. Norblad to replace justice Thomas A. McBride on the Oregon Supreme Court after McBride died in office. Percy then won a full six-year term in 1930’s election, and re-election in 1936, 1942, and finally in 1948. While on the court he served as chief justice from 1941 to 1943, and then died in office on June 14, 1949.

== Family ==
Percy Kelly married in 1910 to Margaret Dawson Gillette.
