= Jack Faust (attorney) =

American lawyer

John R. "Jack" Faust
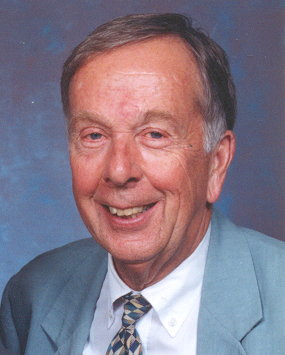
- Born: June 16, 1932 (age 94); Portland, Oregon
- Education: University of Oregon
- Occupations: Attorney, television personality
- Political party: Republican
- Spouse(s): Alice Faust (1956–present)
- Children: 3 children

John R. "Jack" Faust (born June 16, 1932) is a retired Portland, Oregon, attorney, television personality and political activist.

== Early life ==
=== Education ===
Faust graduated from Jefferson High School in Portland, Oregon in 1949, the University of Oregon in 1953, and graduated first in his class at the University of Oregon Law School in 1958. At law school he was Editor-in-chief of the law review and received the Order of the Coif and the Phi Delta Phi Award for Outstanding Graduate Pacific Northwest.

== Military service ==
Served in the U.S. Army from 1953 to 1955 as a Special Agent in the 441st Counterintelligence Corps detachment, Far East Command.

== Career ==
=== Attorney ===
A well-known Oregon lawyer, he practiced with Schwabe, Williamson & Wyatt of Portland and retired 2007. His practice consisted of corporate, appellate and general law. Faust represented public utilities, insurance companies, local baseball teams, public officials, public figures, pro bono clients, and numerous others. He served as president of the Multnomah County Bar Association, and vice-president of the Oregon State Bar. Faust was selected by his peers for listing in Best Lawyers in America, and Best Lawyers in Portland. He is featured as the team's lawyer in the 2014 prize-winning "Battered Bastards of Baseball," a Netflix documentary on the short but colorful life of the Portland Mavericks baseball team. Faust was president of the Multnomah Bar Association from 1974 to 1975.

=== Town Hall ===
For 13 years, Faust moderated Town Hall, a weekly public affairs television program on ABC affiliate KATU. The program featured discussions, often contentious, between public officials, experts and plain citizens on topics that ranged from serious (child abuse) to light (alien abductions). It drew high ratings and received numerous honors including national awards from United Press International, the San Francisco State Broadcaster, and the Iris Award for Outstanding Local Public Affairs Program in the Nation from the National Association of Television Program Executives.

=== Business ===
Jack Faust's business activities include serving on the boards of Pacific Northwest Bell, Equitable Savings & Loan and Western Savings Bank.

=== Civic involvement ===
His civic involvement includes time spent as a member of the United States Advisory Committee on Trade Negotiations, the United States Bus De-regulation Commission, the Oregon Land Conservation and Development Commission (vice chairman), the Oregon Commission on Higher Education In Portland, the Oregon Transportation Study Committee, the Multnomah County Charter review Committee (chairman), the Metropolitan Coliseum-Stadium Task Force, and the Oregon Trail Commission Coordinating Council.

Faust also served as chairman of the Board of Lewis & Clark College, and as a member of the boards of Portland Opera, Campfire Girls, SEI, Arlington Club (president). He served as master of ceremonies or speaker at numerous civic banquets and charitable fundraisers, where he Introduced Presidents Ford, Reagan, Bush Sr., Vice President Nelson Rockefeller, U.S. senators, Oregon governors from Tom McCall to Ted Kulongoski, and other public figures. He served as a director of Oregonians for Higher Education Excellence, a committee that successfully advocated for the 2013 Oregon legislation giving the state's seven public universities self-governance.

== Politics ==
Faust was Campaign Chairman for Senator Bob Packwood from 1974 to 1992, and active in the campaigns of Oregon Governors Victor Atiyeh and Tom McCall, Oregon Secretary of State Norma Paulus, Oregon Attorney General Lee Johnson, and others.

== Awards ==
He was named Portland's First Citizen, recognized as Multnomah County Medical Society Layman of the Year, received the Distinguished Service Award of the Anti-Defamation League, and the Salvation Army Community Pride Award, an Honorary Doctor of Humanities Degree from Lewis & Clark College, the Drug Awareness Council Person of the Year Award, the Oregon Toastmasters Communicator of the Year, and also named as one of 100 Outstanding Graduates of Jefferson High from 1909 to 2009.
