= Kenneth J. O'Connell =

American judge

36th Chief Justice of the Oregon Supreme Court
- In office 1970–1976
- Preceded by: William C. Perry
- Succeeded by: Arno H. Denecke

71st Justice of the Oregon Supreme Court
- In office 1958–1977
- Appointed by: Robert D. Holmes
- Preceded by: James T. Brand
- Succeeded by: Berkeley Lent

Personal details
- Born: December 8, 1909 Bayfield, Wisconsin
- Died: February 18, 2000 (aged 90) Oregon
- Spouse: Esther Foster O'Connell

Kenneth John O'Connell (December 8, 1909 – February 18, 2000) was an American educator and jurist in the state of Oregon. He served as the 36th Chief Justice of the Oregon Supreme Court, serving in that position from 1970 to 1976. A native of Wisconsin, he also served as a longtime professor at the University of Oregon’s law school.

== Early life ==
Kenneth O'Connell was born on December 8, 1909, in Bayfield, Wisconsin. He attended the University of Wisconsin Law School, where he earned two law degrees, one in 1933 and another in 1934.

== Legal career ==
After graduating from law school O'Connell took a job at the University of Oregon School of Law in 1935 as a professor. He was appointed to the position by Dean Wayne Morse and taught a variety of subjects as the school had few professors in the early years. Later he served on commissions in the 1950s and 1960s to revise Oregon's laws and constitution. He had earlier campaigned for law reforms in Oregon and was selected to head the committee to revise Oregon's statutes in 1949. In 1953, O'Connell received the Award of Merit from the Oregon State Bar.

== Judicial career ==
O'Connell's career on the Oregon Supreme Court began in 1958, when Oregon Governor Robert D. Holmes appointed him to the bench to replace James T. Brand after Brand resigned. His appointment came July 1, 1958, and was then elected to a full six-year term later that year. Justice O'Connell won re-election in both 1964 and 1974. While on the court he was given the Distinguished Service Award from the University of Oregon in 1967. He then was selected by his fellow justices to serve as chief justice from 1970 to 1976. O'Connell did not seek re-election in 1976 and then retired from the bench at the end of his term in 1977.

== Family and later life ==
In 1964 Kenneth J. O'Connell married Esther Foster O'Connell. Kenneth had two sons, Tom and Dan, from a previous marriage to Evelyn O'Connell. O’Connell was known to doodle while listening to cases at the supreme court, and used a chalkboard to map out his legal decisions while in chambers. The University of Oregon awarded him their Law Meritorious Service Award in 1985. He was also given the Distinguished Service Award from the American Civil Liberties Union of Oregon. Kenneth O'Connell died in Salem, Oregon, on February 18, 2000, at the age of 90. The University of Oregon holds an annual symposium named in his honor.
