= John McCourt =

American judge

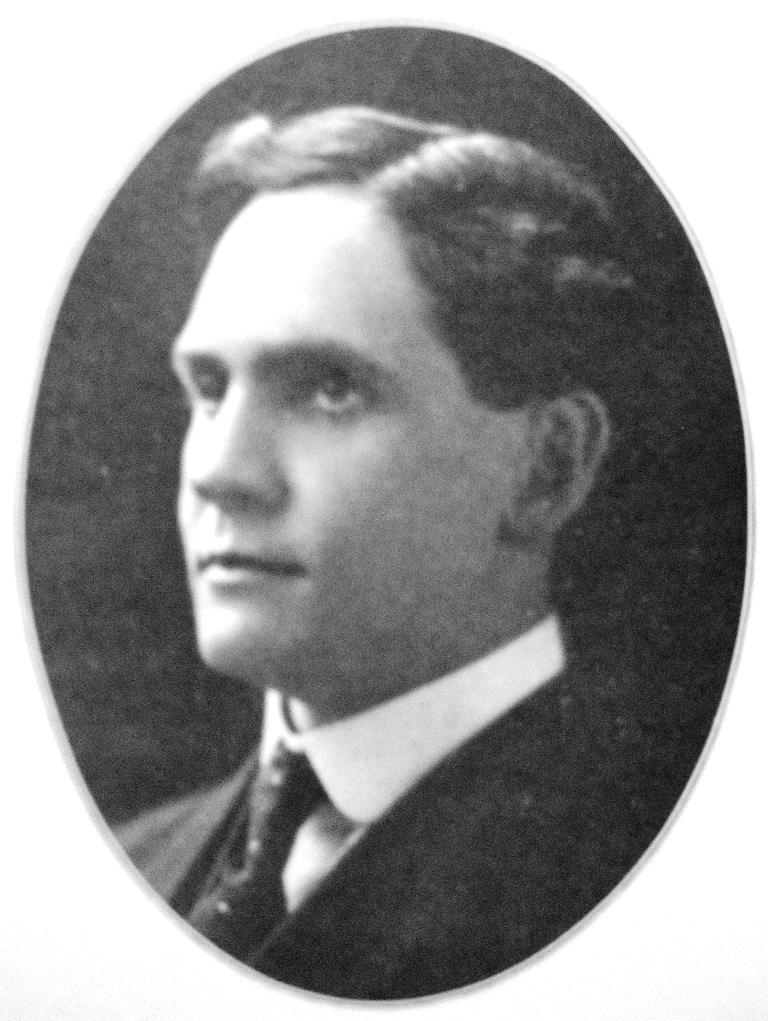
- McCourt circa 1910

51st Justice of the Oregon Supreme Court
- In office 1921–1924
- Appointed by: Ben W. Olcott
- Preceded by: Charles A. Johns
- Succeeded by: Martin L. Pipes

Personal details
- Born: February 26, 1874 Canada
- Died: September 12, 1924 (aged 50) Salem, Oregon
- Spouse: Vera Boothby

John McCourt (February 26, 1874 – September 12, 1924) was an American attorney and jurist in the state of Oregon. He served as the 51st justice of the Oregon Supreme Court. Prior to joining the court, McCourt had worked as United States District Attorney for the District of Oregon. A native of Canada, he was also a state court judge and member of the Oregon House of Representatives.

== Early life ==
John McCourt was born on February 26, 1874, in Listowel, Ontario, Canada. His parents, James McCourt and Emma Farnscomb, and the rest of the family moved to California when John was young. There he received his primary education before he moved to Oregon in 1890. In Oregon he attended Willamette University in the literary department. He then switched to the law school where he graduated in 1896 and began practicing law in Salem, Oregon. He passed the bar in June 1896.

== Legal career ==
In 1898, McCourt was elected and served as a Republican from Marion County, Oregon, in the Oregon House of Representatives during a special session. He returned the following year for the regular legislative assembly. McCourt then moved to Eastern Oregon in 1900 where he practiced law in Pendleton until 1908. On March 17, 1908, he was appointed as United States Attorney for the District of Oregon and served in Portland, Oregon until 1913 when he entered private practice. In November 1918 he was appointed as circuit judge for Multnomah County, Oregon.

On October 8, 1921, Oregon Governor Ben W. Olcott appointed him to the state supreme court to replace Charles A. Johns. McCourt then won election to a full six-year term in 1922, but died in office on September 12, 1924. He died in Salem of septic poisoning from an infection of the teeth and is buried at the Salem Pioneer Cemetery.

== Family ==
His father was born in Scotland and his mother in Canada. John McCourt married on June 28, 1898, to Vera Boothby. The couple had two boys together. McCourt is buried in Salem’s Pioneer Cemetery.
