= James U. Campbell =

American judge

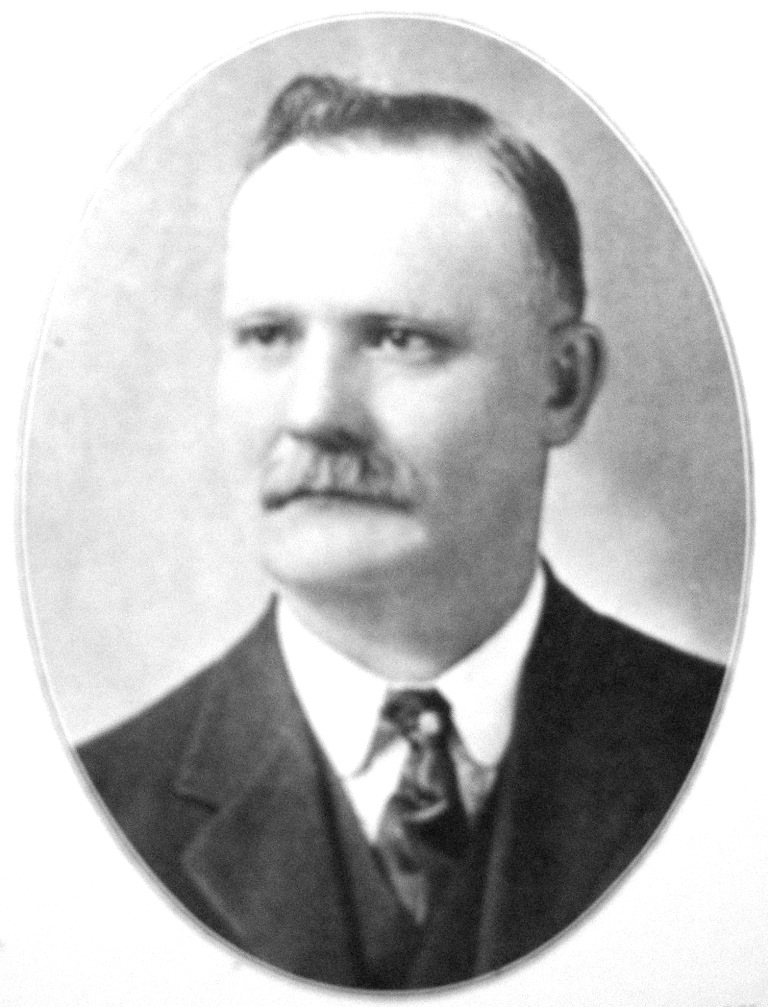
- Campbell circa 1910

25th Chief Justice of the Oregon Supreme Court
- In office 1935–1937
- Preceded by: John L. Rand
- Succeeded by: Henry J. Bean

58th Justice of the Oregon Supreme Court
- In office 1930–1937
- Preceded by: Oliver P. Coshow
- Succeeded by: Hall S. Lusk

Personal details
- Born: August 29, 1866 Prince Edward Island, Canada
- Died: July 16, 1937 (aged 70)
- Spouse: Anna C. Pauling

James Ulysses Campbell (August 29, 1866 – July 16, 1937) was an American judge and politician in Oregon. He was the 25th Chief Justice of the Oregon Supreme Court, serving on Oregon's highest court from 1930 to 1937. He was a native of Prince Edward Island in Canada, was a district attorney, and served in the Oregon House of Representatives.

== Early life ==
James Campbell was born August 29, 1866, on Prince Edward Island. This son of John Campbell and Mary McDougall was then educated at Prince of Wales College, graduating in 1883. Then in 1888 he immigrated to Oregon in the United States where he was admitted to practice law in Oregon City in 1893. When the Spanish–American War broke out in 1898, Campbell fought in the Philippines. While in the Philippines he was promoted twice, from sergeant to second lieutenant and from that rank to first lieutenant. Campbell returned to the United States in 1899.

== Legal career ==
After returning to Oregon once the war was over, he served as deputy district attorney from 1902 to 1906. Then in 1906 he was elected as a Republican to the state House of Representatives representing Clackamas and Multnomah counties. He served again during the 1909 session. Also in 1909 Campbell was appointed as a circuit court judge for the 5th District, and served until 1911.

In 1930 Campbell was elected to the Oregon Supreme Court to replace Oliver P. Coshow whose term had ended. While on the court he was chosen as chief justice by his fellow justices, and served from 1935 to 1937. In 1936 he won re-election to a second six-year term, but only served a short portion of the term when he died in office on July 16, 1937. He is interred at Oswego Pioneer Cemetery in Lake Oswego, Oregon.

== Family ==
Campbell was married in 1901 to Anna C. Pauling, and they had one daughter.
