= George Rossman =

American judge

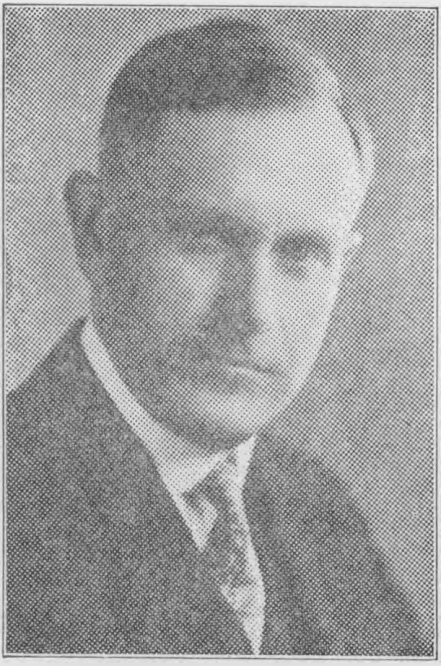
- As depicted in 1928 voter's guide

29th Chief Justice of the Oregon Supreme Court
- In office 1947–1949
- Preceded by: Harry H. Belt
- Succeeded by: Hall S. Lusk

59th Justice of the Oregon Supreme Court
- In office 1927–1965
- Preceded by: George H. Burnett
- Succeeded by: Ralph M. Holman

Personal details
- Born: March 8, 1885 Chicago, Illinois
- Died: March 11, 1967 (aged 82) Salem, Oregon
- Spouse: Loretta Showers

George Rossman (March 8, 1885 – March 11, 1967) was an American lawyer and judge. He was the 29th Chief Justice of the Oregon Supreme Court in the United States. The Illinois native served on Oregon’s highest court for the longest time of any judge in the court's history, from 1927 to 1965. Previously he had worked as a judge for the city of Portland, Oregon and for Multnomah County, Oregon.

== Early life ==
Rossman was born on March 8, 1885, in Chicago, Illinois, to George T. Rossman and Mary Rossman. The family then moved to Tacoma, Washington in 1887 where the younger George received his education and later worked in the mercantile trade. During this time he took correspondence courses from Whitworth College, graduating in 1907 with an A.B. degree in architecture. However, he never became an architect and moved back to Chicago where he earned an LL.B. from the University of Chicago in 1910.

== Oregon ==
In 1910, Rossman moved to Portland, Oregon and began private practice, which he continued until 1917. During this time he married Loretta Showers (d. 1959) in June 1914 in Portland, with whom he had one son, George S. Rossman. Then in 1917 he left private practice and became a city judge until 1922, followed by time as a county circuit court judge from 1922 until 1927.

On September 13, 1927, George Rossman was appointed by Oregon Governor I. L. Patterson to replace justice George H. Burnett on the Oregon Supreme Court after Burnett died in office. Rossman then won a full six-year term on the bench in 1928 followed by re-elections in 1934, 1940, 1946, 1952, and 1958. While serving on the court he helped to found the Capital Card Club in Salem in 1938.

He served as chief justice from 1947 to 1949 before retiring from the bench at the end of his term in 1965. George Rossman is the longest serving justice in the history of the Oregon Supreme Court. During this time Rossman served on an advisory committee for the American Law Institute to help draft A Model Code of Pre-Arraignment Procedure. In 1960, Advocacy and the King’s English was published by The American Society of Legal Writers, which he edited. In 1961, he was awarded the Distinguished Service Award as a faculty member at the University of Oregon.

== Later years ==
Rossman was a trustee at Pacific University, and after leaving the court was a lecturer. George Rossman died on March 11, 1967, in Salem at the age of 82 years.
