= E. M. Page =

American judge

Everil M. Page
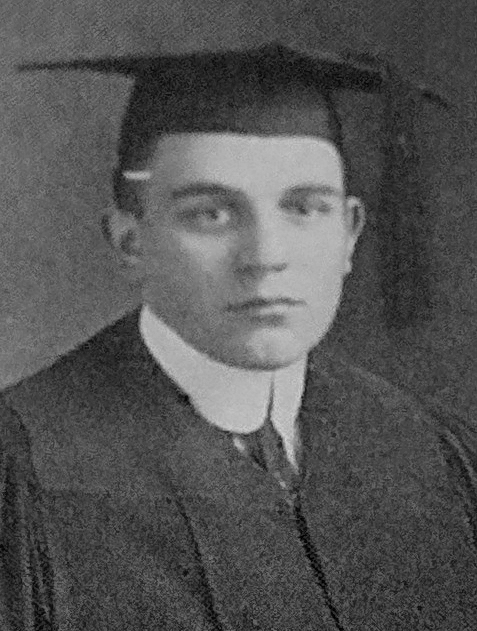
- 1913 graduation picture

63rd Justice of the Oregon Supreme Court
- In office 1949–1950
- Appointed by: Douglas McKay
- Preceded by: Percy R. Kelly
- Succeeded by: Earl C. Latourette

Personal details
- Born: April 28, 1893 Salem, Oregon
- Died: March 15, 1959 (aged 65)

Everil Max "E.M." Page (April 28, 1893 – March 15, 1959) was an American lawyer and judge in the state of Oregon. He was appointed as the 63rd justice of the Oregon Supreme Court, serving for less than a year between 1949 and 1950.

== Early life ==
Page was born in Marion County, Oregon, on April 28, 1893, near Salem, Oregon. He received his high school education at Salem High School, and in 1913 he graduated from Willamette University College of Law. In 1914 he passed the bar examination.

== Judicial career ==
In 1941, after the state legislature created a new judicial district, E.M. Page was appointed to the new court as circuit judge for Marion County, Oregon. Then, on July 8, 1949, Oregon Governor Douglas McKay appointed Page to replace Percy R. Kelly on the Oregon Supreme Court. Due to "ill health", Page resigned from Oregon’s high court less than a year later on January 18, 1950, and McKay replaced him with Earl C. Latourette.

== Later years ==
Everil Max Page died on March 15, 1959, at the age of 65.
