= William R. King (judge) =

American judge (1864–1934)

William Rufus King
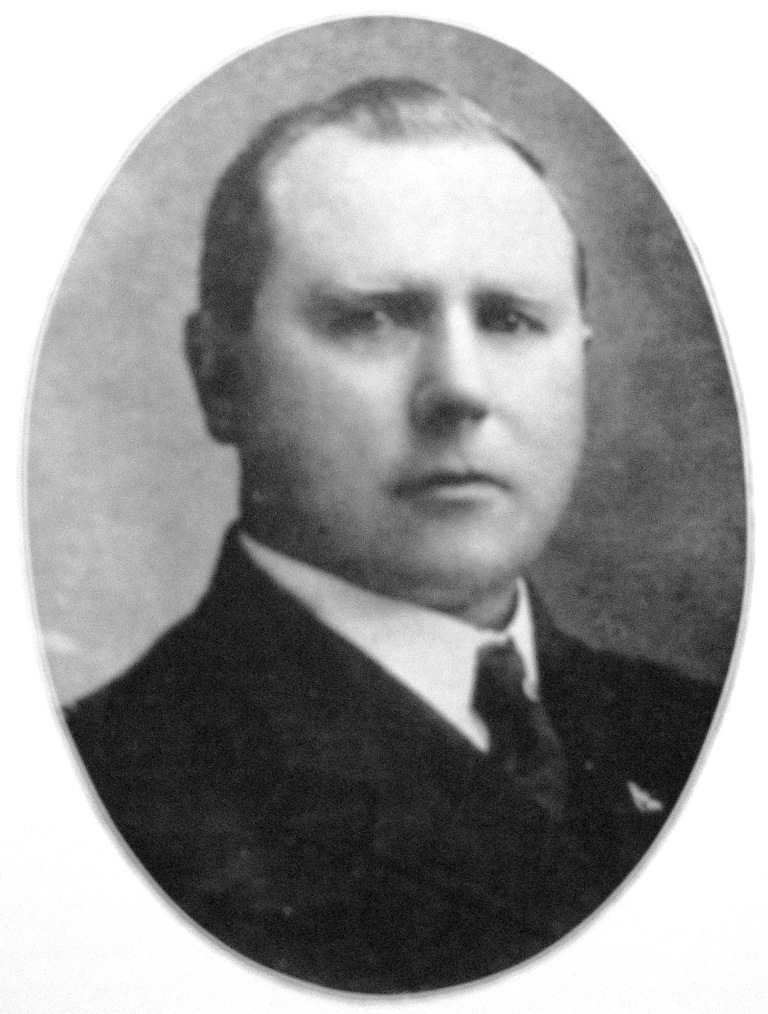
- King circa 1910

37th Justice of the Oregon Supreme Court
- In office 1909–1911
- Preceded by: new position
- Succeeded by: Henry J. Bean

Personal details
- Born: October 3, 1864 Walla Walla, Washington
- Died: June 2, 1934 (aged 69) Washington, DC
- Spouse: L. Myrtle King

William R. King (October 3, 1864 – June 2, 1934) was an American politician and judge in the state of Oregon. He was the 37th associate justice of the Oregon Supreme Court. A native of Washington, he also served in Oregon's legislature and promoted the initiative and referendum legislation system.

== Early life ==
William King was born near Walla Walla, Washington Territory on October 3, 1864, to David Rufus King and Elizabeth King (née Estes). Ten years later in 1874 William and his parents moved to Malheur County, Oregon, where he received his basic education. King then attended Oregon Agricultural College from 1882 until 1885 before moving on to Indiana's Central Normal College in Danville to study law.

In Danville, he married L. Myrtle King on December 6, 1892. King studied there from 1889 to 1891 and earn an LL.B. degree from the school and passed the Indiana bar in July 1891. After graduation he returned to Oregon and was admitted to the bar in January 1893. King practiced law in the Eastern Oregon communities of Ontario, Vale, and Baker.

== Political career ==
In 1892, King was elected to the Oregon House of Representatives as a Democrat representing Malheur County. He was then elected in 1894 to the state senate as a Democrat Populist. While in the legislature he was a proponent of the initiative and referendum that Oregon would later adopt. In 1898, he ran for Governor of Oregon and lost to T. T. Geer in the general election.

King was appointed as the Commissioner of the Oregon Supreme Court on February 23, 1907. On February 12, 1909, Oregon Governor George Earle Chamberlain appointed King to the state supreme court when the court expanded from three to five justices. He left the state's high court at the end of the term on January 1, 1911.

== Later life ==
After serving on the bench, King moved to Washington, DC, where he served as chief counsel while working for the United States Bureau of Reclamation. He married and had one daughter, Myrtle Marion King, and one son, Eldon R. King, an attorney. He also lived in Honolulu, Hawaii and Los Angeles, California. William R. King died in Washington, DC, in his hotel room on June 2, 1934. He had been a member of the Masons, the Woodmen of the World, the B.P.O.E., and the Knights of Pythias.

== See also ==
- National Irrigation Congress
