= John L. Rand =

American politician and jurist (1861–1942)

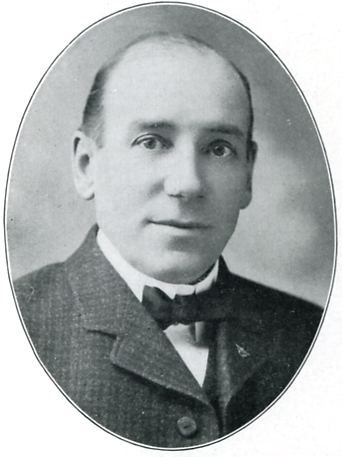
- Rand circa 1910

22nd Chief Justice of the Oregon Supreme Court
- In office 1927–29, 1933–1935 – 1939–1941
- Preceded by: George H. Burnett; Henry J. Bean
- Succeeded by: Oliver P. Coshow; James U. Campbell; Percy R. Kelly

52nd Justice of the Oregon Supreme Court
- In office 1921–1942
- Appointed by: Ben W. Olcott
- Preceded by: Henry L. Benson
- Succeeded by: Arthur D. Hay

Personal details
- Born: October 28, 1861 Portsmouth, New Hampshire
- Died: November 19, 1942 (aged 81)
- Spouse: Edith G. Packwood

John Langdon Rand (October 28, 1861 – November 19, 1942) was an American politician and jurist in the state of Oregon. He served as the 22nd Chief Justice of the Oregon Supreme Court. Overall he was on Oregon’s highest court from 1921 to 1942 serving as chief justice three times. A native of New Hampshire, he served in the Oregon State Senate prior to his judicial career.

== Early life ==
John Rand was born October 28, 1861, in Portsmouth, New Hampshire, to John Sullivan Rand and the former Elvira Wallis Odiorne. John junior was educated in Portsmouth and attended Smith Preparatory School there before enrolling at Dartmouth College. Rand graduated from Dartmouth in 1883 and moved to Walla Walla, Washington where he was a professor at Whitman College until 1885. That year he was accepted in Washington's, then still a territory, bar.

== Legal career ==
In 1886, he moved to Baker City, Oregon, and was accepted into the Oregon State Bar and began serving as that city's attorney until 1888. From 1888 to 1890, he served as the county’s district attorney. Then in 1902, he was elected to a four-year term as a Republican to the Oregon State Senate representing Baker, Harney, and Malheur counties. After his stint in the Senate, Rand returned to private law practice.

On October 18, 1921, John Rand was appointed by Oregon Governor Ben W. Olcott to replace justice Henry L. Benson on the Oregon Supreme Court after Benson died in office. He won a full six-year term in the 1922 elections, and was re-elected in 1928, 1934, and 1940. While on the bench of the state supreme court he served as chief justice from 1927 to 1929, 1933 to 1935, and 1939 to 1941 before dying in office on November 19, 1942.

Rand was involved in a prolonged legal and political controversy in the late 1920s. The controversy began with a complex legal battle over the estate of E. Henry Wemme, a wealthy immigrant to Oregon. One attorney in the case, former state senator George W. Joseph, accused opposing counsel Thomas Mannix of engaging in a mining deal with Justice Rand, while the case was being heard. Ultimately both Joseph and Mannix were disbarred, prompting Joseph to successfully seek the Republican nomination for Governor of Oregon.

== Family ==
On July 23, 1895, Rand married Edith G. Packwood, and they had two sons. Edith was the daughter of William H. Packwood who served at the Oregon Constitutional Convention in 1857.

== See also ==
- Odiorne Point State Park
