= Henry J. Bean =

American judge

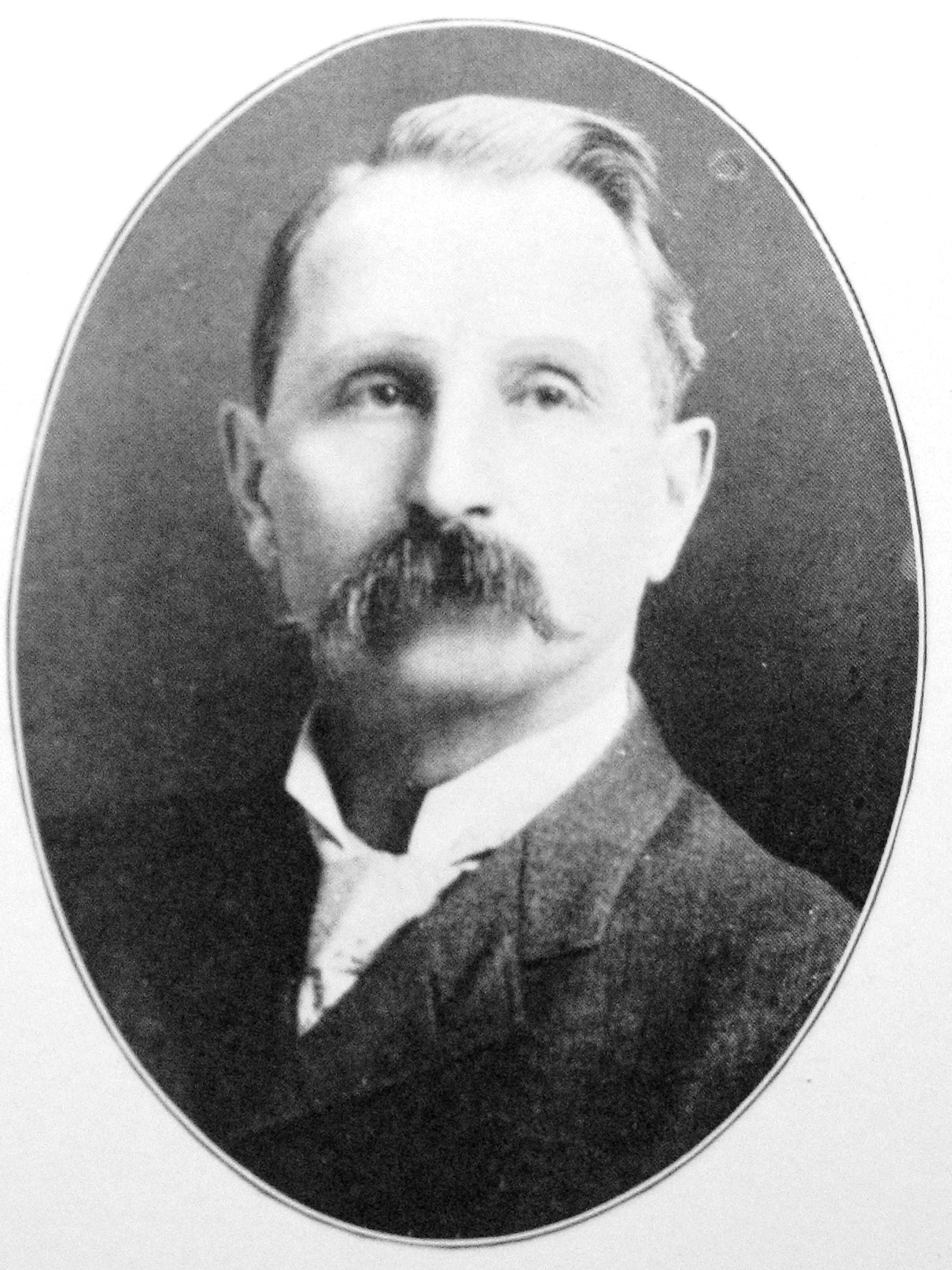
- Bean circa 1910

24th Chief Justice of the Oregon Supreme Court
- In office 1931-1933 – 1937-1939
- Preceded by: Oliver P. Coshow, James U. Campbell
- Succeeded by: John L. Rand

40th Justice of the Oregon Supreme Court
- In office 1911–1941
- Preceded by: William R. King
- Succeeded by: James T. Brand

Personal details
- Born: November 13, 1853 Bethel, Maine
- Died: May 8, 1941 (aged 87) Oregon
- Spouse: Mattie Magahey

Henry J. Bean (November 13, 1853 – May 8, 1941) was an American politician and judge in Oregon. He was the 24th Chief Justice of the Oregon Supreme Court. He served in that role twice during the 1930s. At his death on the bench, he was the longest-serving justice in the state’s history. A native of Maine, he also served in the Oregon House of Representatives.

== Early life ==
Henry Bean was born in Bethel, Maine, on November 13, 1853, to Elizabeth E. Bean (née Swift) and Timothy Bean.

There he attended Gould, Hebron, and North Yarmouth Academies for his primary education. Bean attended Gould Academy from 1874 to 1878 before spending six years as a teacher. Later he studied law under Maine Supreme Court justice Enoch Foster and was admitted to the bar in 1881.

He then moved to Oregon where he set up a law practice in Pendleton, Oregon, in 1882. In private practice, Bean formed a partnership with James A. Fee from 1885 to 1886. In that Eastern Oregon town, he served as the city attorney in 1883 and then as city recorder from 1885 to 1886. Bean then served a term in the Oregon State House in 1889. He represented Umatilla County in the lower chamber as a Republican. Bean married Mattie Magahey in Pendleton in 1896. They had two sons together.

== Judicial career ==
After serving as district attorney from 1896 to 1900, Henry Bean then served as a county judge for Umatilla County from 1904 to 1906. Following that he was selected to be a circuit court judge from 1906 to 1910.

In November 1910, Bean was elected to the Oregon Supreme Court where he would serve until his death. He won re-election in 1914, 1920, 1926, 1932, and 1938. His thirty years on the bench made him the longest-serving justice on the court until co-worker George Rossman earned that distinction.

Bean served as chief justice twice during his tenure. First from 1931 to 1933 and then from 1937 to 1939. He died in office on May 8, 1941, and was replaced by James T. Brand.
