= Charles E. Wolverton =

American judge

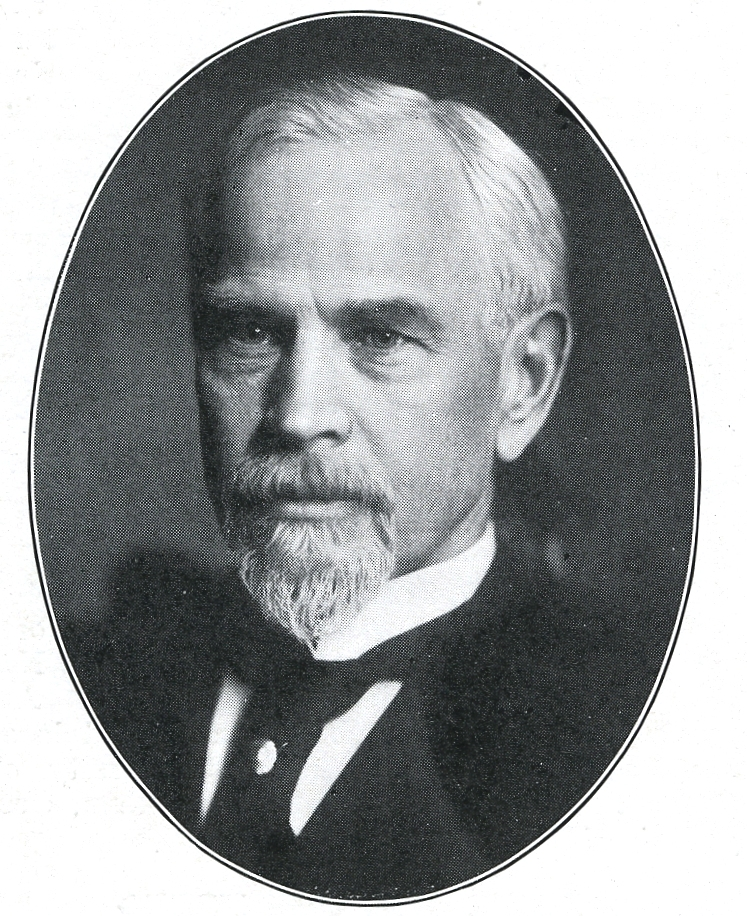
- Wolverton c. 1910

Judge of the United States District Court for the District of Oregon
- In office November 20, 1905 – September 21, 1926
- Appointed by: Theodore Roosevelt
- Preceded by: Charles B. Bellinger
- Succeeded by: John Hugh McNary

18th Chief Justice of the Oregon Supreme Court
- In office 1905
- Preceded by: Frank A. Moore
- Succeeded by: Robert S. Bean
- In office 1898–1900
- Preceded by: Frank A. Moore
- Succeeded by: Robert S. Bean

Personal details
- Born: Charles Edwin Wolverton; May 16, 1851 Des Moines County, Iowa
- Died: September 21, 1926 (aged 75) Gearhart, Oregon
- Education: Christian College (B.S., A.B.); University of Kentucky College of Law (LL.B.)

Charles Edwin Wolverton (May 16, 1851 – September 21, 1926) was an American state and federal judge in the state of Oregon. He was the 18th Chief Justice on the Oregon Supreme Court. He served as the chief twice during his eleven years on Oregon's highest court, followed by 21 years as a United States district judge of the United States District Court for the District of Oregon.

== Early life ==
Charles Wolverton was born on May 16, 1851, in Des Moines County, Iowa, to John Wolverton and his wife the former Mary Jane Nealy. In 1853, the family immigrated to the Oregon Territory. There Charles received an education at Christian College in Monmouth, Oregon, earning a Bachelor of Science degree in 1871. The following year he earned an Artium Baccalaureus degree from the same school. Wolverton then returned east and earned a Bachelor of Laws from the University of Kentucky College of Law in 1874.

== Legal career ==
Following law school, Charles returned to Oregon where he began private practice in Albany, Oregon from 1874 until 1894. During this time he was the attorney for the Linn County School Board from 1878 to 1881. Also while in private practice Wolverton married Clara Ellen Price in 1878, a marriage from which there would be no children.

== State judicial service ==
In 1894, Wolverton was elected to the Oregon Supreme Court to replace William Paine Lord. He won re-election for a second six-year term in 1900. During his time on the court he served as chief justice twice from 1898 to 1900 and then again in 1905 until he resigned on December 4, 1905, to accept a federal judicial post. Thomas G. Hailey was appointed by Oregon Governor George Earle Chamberlain to finish Wolverton's term. While on the court he received an honorary law degree from Willamette University College of Law in 1900.

== Federal judicial service ==
Wolverton received a recess appointment from President Theodore Roosevelt on November 20, 1905, to a seat on the United States District Court for the District of Oregon vacated by Judge Charles B. Bellinger. He was nominated to the same position by President Roosevelt on December 5, 1905. He was confirmed by the United States Senate on January 10, 1906, and received his commission the same day. His service terminated on September 21, 1926, due to his death in Gearhart, Oregon.

=== Fellow judge ===
After each stint as chief justice on the Oregon court Wolverton was followed by Robert S. Bean. Bean would then join Wolverton on the federal court in 1909 when Congress added an additional judgeship to the Oregon district.

== See also ==
- Sketch of Wolverton

== Sources ==
Legal offices
Preceded by Charles B. Bellinger	Judge of the United States District Court for the District of Oregon; 1905–1926	Succeeded by John Hugh McNary
