= John O. Bailey =

American judge and politician (1880–1959)

27th Chief Justice of the Oregon Supreme Court
- In office 1943–1945
- Preceded by: Percy R. Kelly
- Succeeded by: Harry H. Belt

59th Justice of the Oregon Supreme Court
- In office 1933–1950
- Preceded by: George M. Brown
- Succeeded by: Walter L. Tooze

Personal details
- Born: September 26, 1880 Grinnell, Iowa, U.S.
- Died: February 16, 1959 (aged 78) Portland, Oregon, U.S.
- Spouse: Verna Alice Chase Bailey
- Education: Harvard University; Harvard Law School

John Ora Bailey (September 26, 1880 – February 16, 1959) was an American judge and politician in the state of Oregon. He was the 27th Chief Justice of the Oregon Supreme Court, serving on Oregon’s highest court from 1933 to 1950. Bailey also served in the Oregon House of Representatives and the Oregon State Senate. A native of Iowa and Harvard graduate, he began his public service as an assistant attorney general.

== Early life ==
John Baily was born on September 26, 1880, in Grinnell, Iowa. There he received his education in the local schools before attending college at Harvard University. After graduation in 1906 he then attended and graduated from Harvard Law School. Next Bailey moved west to Spokane, Washington, where he practiced law from 1907 until 1910 when he moved to Portland, Oregon.

== Oregon ==
In 1911, Bailey married the former Alice Chase, and the two would have four children. In Portland he continued practicing law through 1915 with the firm Platt and Platt. Beginning that year he was a deputy attorney general, serving until 1920. In that role he handled a variety of land fraud cases and helped to draft legislation that helped the state of Oregon better protect its state-owned land holdings. From 1920 to 1933 he returned to private practice at the firm Perkins and Bailey.

Also during this time he served in the state house from 1925 to 1929 as a Republican from Multnomah County. Beginning with 1929 legislature he served in the state senate for two sessions. Bailey served on the Portland Public Schools's board from 1927 to 1930, including as its chair in 1930. While in the legislature he wrote the bill that became the state's law on textbooks.

In 1932, Bailey was elected to replace justice George M. Brown on the Oregon Supreme Court when Brown’s term ended in 1933. John Bailey won additional six-year terms in 1938 and 1944 before resigning on November 15, 1950. Bailey served as chief justice during World War II from 1943 to 1945. He wrote the opinions on cases involving the 10-hour work day for factory workers, the constitutionality of the worker's compensation program, and several cases involving interstate commerce, among others.

== Later years and family ==
Bailey's children were two sons, Robert & Jason and two daughters, Mrs. Francis(Fran)White and Mrs.(Barbara) Hedges. John Ora Bailey died in Portland on February 16, 1959, at the age of 78 years.
