= Lesil McGuire =

American politician

Lesil L. McGuire
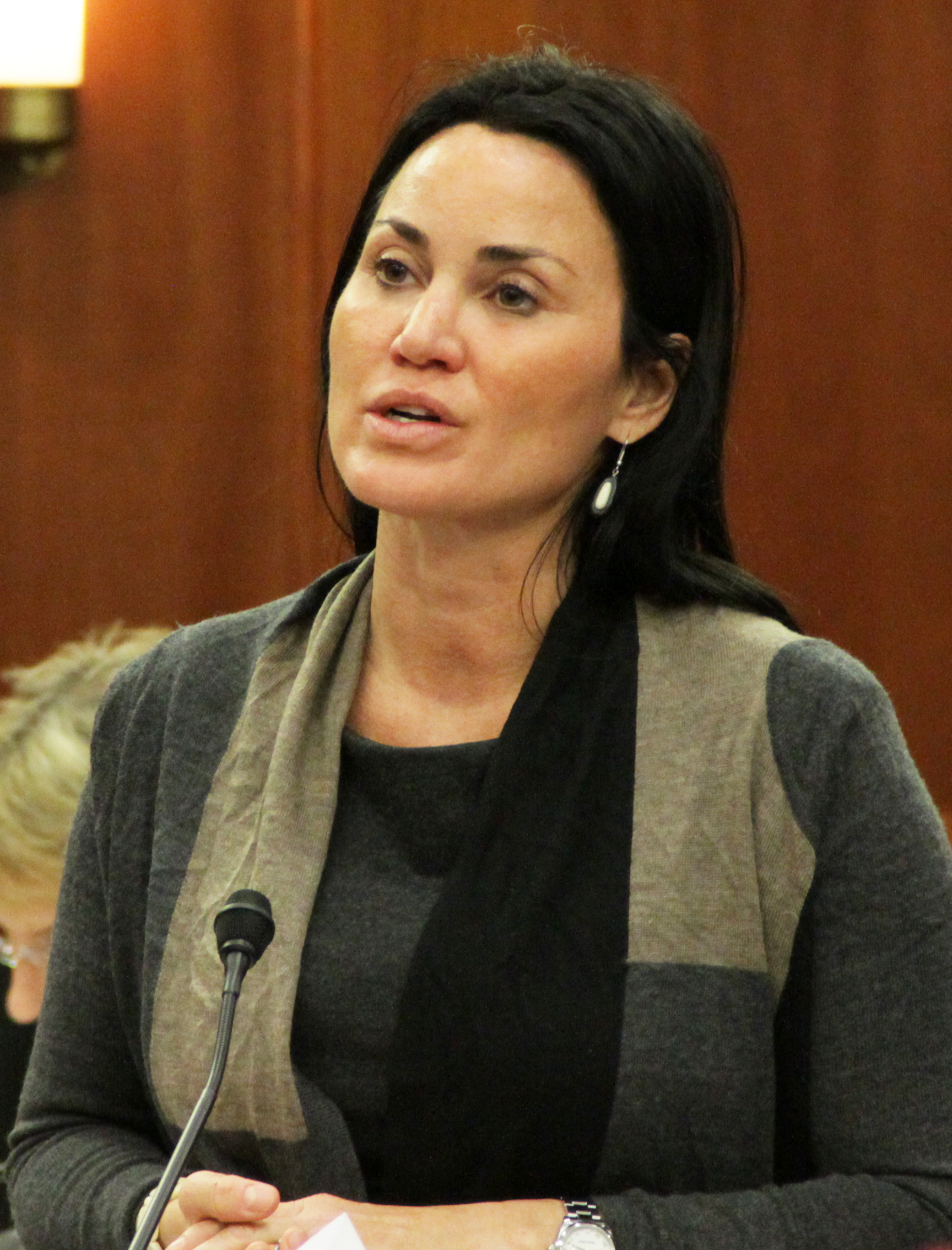
- McGuire in 2014

Member of the Alaska State Senate
- In office January 15, 2007 – January 23, 2017
- Preceded by: Ben Stevens
- Succeeded by: Natasha von Imhof
- Constituency: N district (2007–2013); K district (2013–2017)

Member of the Alaska House of Representatives
- In office January 20, 2003 – January 16, 2007
- Preceded by: John Cowdery
- Succeeded by: Craig Johnson
- Constituency: 17th district (2001–2003); 28th district (2003–2007)

Personal details
- Born: Lesil Lynn McGuire; January 22, 1971 (age 55) Portland, Oregon, U.S.
- Party: Republican
- Education: Willamette University
- Profession: Politician, Attorney

Lesil Lynn McGuire (born January 22, 1971) is an American politician in the state of Alaska. She served as a Republican member of the Alaska Senate from 2007 until 2017, after her tenure as a member of the Alaska House of Representatives from 2000 through 2006. She served Senate District N until redistricting in 2012 placed her in District K for 2013.

== Early years ==
McGuire was born in Portland, Oregon, on January 22, 1971, before her family moved to Alaska in 1973. She attended Willamette University in Salem, Oregon, beginning in 1989, where she majored in both political science and speech. She also served two years as an intern and press aide for Senator Ted Stevens of Alaska before graduating in 1993 with a Bachelor of Arts degree. After college she attended law school at Willamette University College of Law, graduating with a Juris Doctor in 1998. In law school she worked for Willamette Law Review, the school's legal journal. After graduation, she returned to Alaska and clerked briefly for Birch Horton Bittner & Cherot before taking a position as an aide to the Alaska State House Judiciary Committee. She is a German Marshall Fellow and a Henry Toll Fellow.

== Personal life ==
She has one son, Grayson McGuire Anderson.

== Political career ==
In 2000, at the age of 29, she won election to the Alaska House of Representatives to replace John Cowdery, who was elected to the Alaska State Senate. She served in the House as a moderate Republican until 2006 when she was elected to the Alaska State Senate, continuing to serve as a moderate Republican. She was the youngest member of the Alaska State Senate at the time. She was also the first woman president of PNWER where she established the Arctic Caucus, in addition to her duties with the state. She was also active with CSG, otherwise known as the Council of State Governments, having served as the past chair of the Western Region. She has been a leader in energy and Arctic policy as well as women's rights.

During the 2012 state election, McGuire joined the new Senate Majority Caucus and was appointed as Senate Rules Committee chair. The new Majority Caucus that was formed ousted the existing Bipartisan Coalition (of which McGuire was a part of) with oil tax reform being one of its main objectives. The caucus produced a law, signed by the governor, that brought the Alaska oil tax regime into a more competitive structure, as the previous tax system was among the highest in the world.

She has been a leader in overall state energy policy helping craft a bi-partisan energy bill that was signed into law in 2012. This law, among other things, created an Emerging Energy Technology Fund, a Renewable Energy Grant Fund and has paved the way to expanding energy sources and technologies across the state. Alaska is a global leader in hybrid wind technology and deployment in extreme environments.

McGuire announced her decision to run for Alaska's Lieutenant Governor in Alaska gubernatorial election, 2014. She was the first candidate to declare for lieutenant governor and highlighted her statewide experience. She did not run in the primary, however, and the nomination was uncontested, going to outgoing Anchorage Borough Mayor Dan Sullivan. Sullivan, paired with incumbent Governor Sean Parnell, lost in the general election.

Beginning in 2013, she served as the co-chair of the Alaska Arctic Policy Commission. The commission was made up of 10 legislators (from the Senate and the House) and 16 subject matter experts. Over the course of two years they traveled across the state talking and listening to locals and elders from a broad range of communities and perspectives. The work culminated in a Final Report and Implementation Plan to the Alaska State Legislature in 2015. Deriving from that work, McGuire helped craft the first Arctic Policy for the state of Alaska. That same year McGuire was leader in getting Alaska's Arctic Policy, the first of its kind from a sub-national jurisdiction, established into law.

In 2013 she established the first Women's Summit in Alaska. The summit brings together a broad range of women leaders and speakers to convene on such topics as the gender pay gap, housing and homelessness, sexual assault and domestic violence. Now in its 4th year, the summit works in conjunction with the University of Alaska Anchorage and has raised over $70,000 for scholarships.

On September 28, 2015, McGuire announced that she would not run for reelection to the state senate.

== 2026 Alaska gubernatorial election ==
On May 29, 2026, McGuire filled a letter of intent for Alaska's 2026 governor's race.

Honorary titles
Preceded by Gretchen Guess	Youngest member of the Alaska Senate; 2007–2017	Succeeded by David Wilson
