= David Schuman =

American judge and attorney (1944–2019)

Hon. David Schuman

Judge of the Oregon Court of Appeals
- In office 2001–2014
- Preceded by: Paul De Muniz
- Succeeded by: Chris Garrett

Personal details
- Born: May 8, 1944 Glencoe, Illinois
- Died: October 8, 2019 Eugene, Oregon
- Spouse: Sharon Schuman

David Schuman (May 8, 1944 – October 8, 2019) was an American attorney, who served as a judge of the Oregon Court of Appeals from 2001 to 2014.

== Early life and education ==
Born in the Chicago suburb of Glencoe, Illinois, Schuman came in second in the North American speed skating finals in the 220 yard competition at the age of 17. He graduated from New Trier High School in 1962, and received a Bachelor of Arts degree in psychology from Stanford University in 1966. He entered the University of California, Hastings College of the Law but dropped out after six weeks, instead enrolling in San Francisco State University, where he received a Master of Arts degree in 1968.

== Academic and judicial career ==
After leaving San Francisco State, he taught English at Santa Clara University. He left Santa Clara after two years to return to his native Illinois and earned a Ph.D. in English literature from the University of Chicago in 1974. He returned to California to teach literature at Deep Springs College but left teaching in 1981 to attend law school, receiving a J.D. from the University of Oregon School of Law in 1984.

After leaving the University of Oregon School of Law, Schuman clerked for Oregon Supreme Court Justice Hans A. Linde from 1984 to 1985. He then became an Assistant Attorney General in the Appellate Division of the Oregon Department of Justice from 1985 to 1987. He left the Justice Department in 1987 to teach law at the University of Oregon School of Law and was the school's Associate Dean for Academic Affairs from 1994 to 1996. He left the University of Oregon School of Law in 1997 when he was appointed as Oregon's Deputy Attorney General under Hardy Myers.

In 2001, he again left the Justice Department to return to teaching at the University of Oregon School of Law, where he was promoted to full professor. He left the school again later that year, after having been appointed to the Oregon Court of Appeals by governor John Kitzhaber. Schuman was elected to a full six-year term in 2002 and again in 2008.

Schuman retired from the Court of Appeals in February 2014, and returned to teaching at the UO's School of Law in 2015.

== Awards and honors ==
- David Frohnmayer Award for Public Service, 2014

== Death and legacy ==
Schuman died on October 8, 2019, due to injuries sustained in an October 5 bicycle crash in Eugene, Oregon.

In 2021, a memorial bench for Schuman was installed at the Mohawk General Store in Mohawk, Oregon.

Schuman's wife of 51 years, Sharon, compiled his writings in A Voice for Justice: Writings of David Schuman.

Legal offices
| Preceded by Paul De Muniz | Judge of the Oregon Court of Appeals; March 19, 2001–January 31, 2014 | Succeeded by Chris Garrett |
