= Thomas A. Balmer =

American judge (born 1952)

Tom Balmer
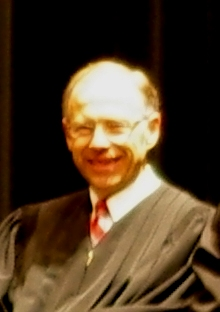

Chief Justice of the Oregon Supreme Court
- In office May 1, 2012 – June 30, 2018
- Preceded by: Paul De Muniz
- Succeeded by: Martha Lee Walters

Justice of the Oregon Supreme Court
- In office September 2001 – December 31, 2022
- Appointed by: John Kitzhaber
- Preceded by: Ted Kulongoski
- Succeeded by: Stephen Bushong

Personal details
- Born: January 31, 1952 (age 73); Longview, Washington, U.S.
- Education: Oberlin College (BA); University of Chicago (JD)

Thomas Ancil Balmer (born January 31, 1952) is a former justice and chief justice of the Oregon Supreme Court. A native of Washington, he was appointed to the court in 2001 as a justice, later serving as chief justice from 2012 to 2018. He retired on December 31, 2022.

== Early life ==
Balmer was born on January 31, 1952, in Longview, Washington. He graduated from the now-closed Jackson High School in Portland, Oregon.

Balmer graduated from Oberlin College in Oberlin, Ohio in 1974, earning a Bachelor of Arts degree with High Honors. Balmer graduated from the University of Chicago Law School in 1977.

== Legal career ==
Balmer began his legal career with the Boston law firm of Choate, Hall & Stewart in 1977. He served in the Antitrust Division of the U.S. Department of Justice from 1979 to 1980. He returned to private practice, joining the Washington, D.C. law firm of Wald, Harkrader & Ross in 1980. Returning to Oregon in 1982, Balmer worked at Lindsay, Hart, Neil & Weigler, becoming a partner in 1986. Balmer taught at Lewis & Clark Law School from 1983 to 1984, and again from 1990 to 1992 as an adjunct professor. He also was an adjunct professor of antitrust law at Willamette University College of Law in 2018–19. From 1986 to 1987 he was the chairperson of the Oregon State Bar antitrust law section, and in 1992 to 1993 he was chairperson of the Multnomah County Legal Aid Service’s Board of Directors.

Later he served as a deputy attorney general for the state of Oregon from 1993 to 1997. While there he worked for the Oregon Attorney General, Ted Kulongoski. Balmer is a former partner of Ater Wynne LLP, focusing on antitrust law, government regulations, and commercial litigation. In 1997, he became a member of the board of directors for Classroom Law Project, and from 2000 to 2001, he served as an adjunct professor of political science at Lewis & Clark College, 2000–2001.

On September 20, 2001 Balmer was appointed to the Oregon Supreme Court. Governor John Kitzhaber appointed Balmer to replace Ted Kulongoski after Kulongoski resigned to campaign for governor. (Kulongoski later won the election to replace Kitzhaber.) Balmer was then elected to a full six-year term in 2002 and re-elected to new terms in 2008, 2014, and 2020.

In January 2012 it was announced that Balmer's fellow justices had selected him to become the new chief justice of the court, from May 1, 2012, replacing Paul De Muniz. Martha Lee Walters succeeded Balmer as chief justice on July 1, 2018, although Balmer has continued to serve as a justice.

In October 2022, Balmer announced his retirement from the Supreme Court at the end of the year.

=== Select publications ===
- "Recombinant DNA: Legal Responses to a New Biohazard." Environmental Law, vol. 7, no. 2, 1977, pp. 293–313.
- Co-author of Antitrust Review of Proposed Administrative Actions, 61 B.U. L. Rev. 90, (1981).
- Co-author of Conflicts Between State Law and the Sherman Act, 44 U. Pitt. L. Rev. 1 (1982).
- "Of Energy, Antitrust, and Institutional Competence: A Note on Alabama Power Co. v. Nuclear Regulatory Commission.” Environmental Law, vol. 14, no. 2, 1984, pp. 257–76.
- "Holmes on Law as a Business and a Profession.” Journal of Legal Education, vol. 42, no. 4, 1992, pp. 591–93.
- " 'Present Appreciation and Future Advantage:' A Note on the Influence of Hobbes on Holmes." American Journal of Legal History, vol. 47, no. 4, 2005, pp. 412–34.
- "Does Oregon's Constitution Need a Due Process Clause?" Thought on Due Process and Other Limitations on State Action, from State Constitutional Law Symposium in Honor of Justice Robert F. Utter, organized by Hugh D. Spitzer, 91 Wash. L. Rev. Online 157-76 (2016).

Legal offices
Preceded by Ted Kulongoski	Justice of the Oregon Supreme Court; 2001–2022	Succeeded by Stephen Bushong
Preceded by Paul De Muniz	Chief Justice of the Oregon Supreme Court; 2012–2018	Succeeded by Martha Lee Walters
