= Oregon Civic Justice Center =

Building on the Willamette University campus in Salem, Oregon, U.S.

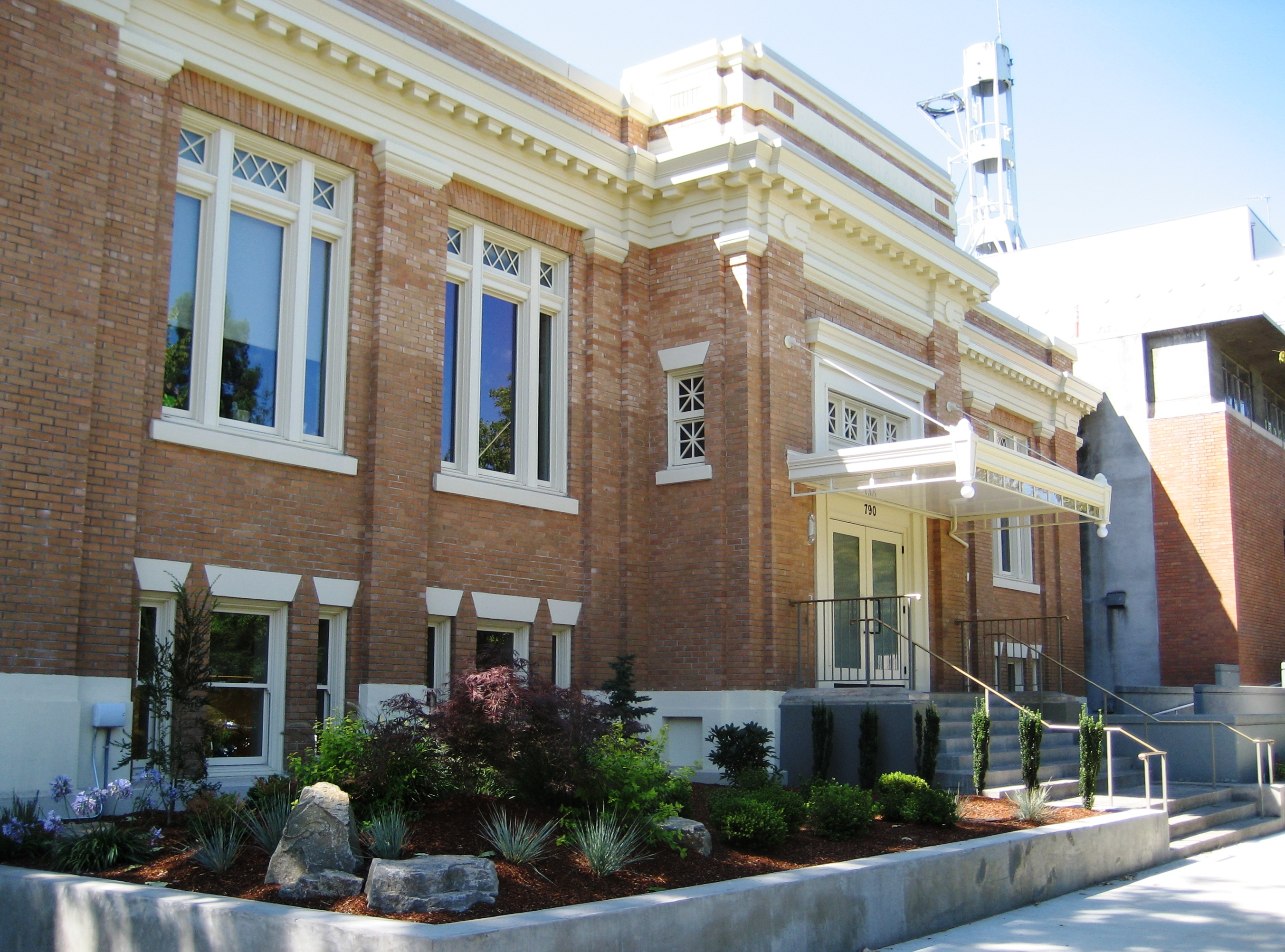
- Exterior in 2008

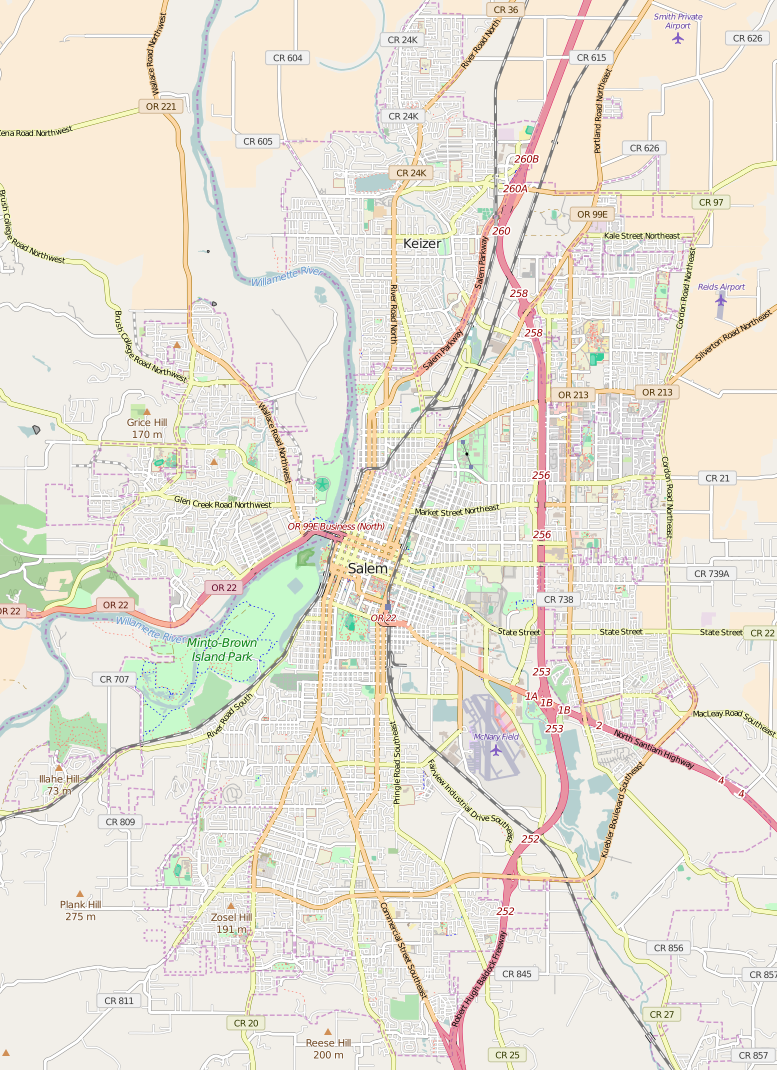
- Location within Salem OR Location within Oregon
- Former names: Carnegie Building

General information
- Architectural style: Beaux Arts
- Location: Salem, Oregon, USA
- Coordinates: 44.938155°N 123.032820°W
- Current tenants: Willamette University College of Law
- Inaugurated: September 12, 1912
- Cost: $30,000
- Owner: Willamette University

Technical details
- Floor count: 3

The Oregon Civic Justice Center is a three-story former library building on the campus of Willamette University in downtown Salem, Oregon, United States. Built in 1912 as a Carnegie library for the city of Salem, the building now houses several programs of Willamette University College of Law. Prior to the law school's moving into the facility in 2008, the building was used by the adjacent Young Women's Christian Association (YWCA) from 1971 to 2006.

Willamette purchased the old library in 2003 and later selected the College of Law as the program at the school to gain use of the building. The university began renovations in 2007 to restore part of the original layout and modernize the facility to accommodate the needs of modern education. After the brick-faced, Beaux Arts style structure was remodeled, community oriented programs from the law school relocated to the renamed Oregon Civic Justice Center. This center houses programs such as a legal clinic and the school's law review journal.

== History ==
On October 12, 1901, the Salem Woman's Club was organized with the wife of Oregon Governor Theodore Thurston Geer serving as president of the organization. Two years later the group started the Salem Public Library at Geer's home, and then later located at Chemeketa and High streets in downtown Salem in the then city hall, with the library's collection totaling 50 books at that time. The library group hired a librarian, Miss F. Phillips, for a salary of $20 per month to run the library. In 1907, the group explored options to build a stand-alone library building using funds provided by Andrew Carnegie, who was providing funds for building libraries around the world.

In May 1909, the Woman's Club purchased an option to buy the property on the southwest corner of Winter and State streets for $5500, which was located across State from Willson Park (a city park at that time). This group then raised the funds to purchase the land for $12,000, and Salem applied for a grant from the Carnegie foundation. The city was allotted $14,000 by the foundation to build a library, but the Women's Club which owned the existing library and land had not been involved in the process. The organization was able to get the money rescinded, and in November 1910, worked with the city to increase their maintenance fund for the library. Carnegie then raised the grant to $27,500 at the lobbying of Lulu Bush (daughter-in-law to Asahel Bush) and the Woman's Club deeded the lot and the other library assets to the city of Salem.

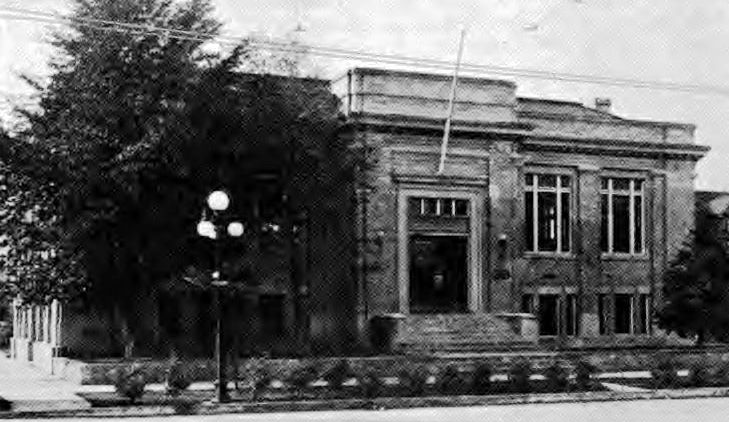
The library in 1920

On September 12, 1912, the new library opened on the property near Willamette University and the Oregon State Capitol, though construction on the structure was not completed, and much of the furniture had not been installed in the building. The completed structure included hardwood floors, crown molding, windows that were two stories tall, and a fireplace. The library cost $30,000 to build, and within a year of operating had expanded to serve nearly 7,700 patrons with a collection of nearly 10,500 books. On January 4, 1920, a small fire damaged the furnace room and about 50 books at the library.

In 1914, the YWCA of Salem was organized by the same Salem Women's Club. Located in downtown on Cottage Street Northeast, the YWCA moved in 1954 to the lot adjoining the library. By the 1960s, the small library had a collection in excess of 100,000 volumes, but needed a larger facility. A public campaign to build a new library began in 1968, with the library to be part of a larger government center that included a city hall and fire station. In 1971, the YWCA purchased the adjacent Carnegie library building for $150,000, and on July 6, 1972, the Salem Public Library vacated the Carnegie building and moved to Salem's new Civic Center located west of the old library. Located next to the YWCA's existing home, the old library was turned into the organization's youth center. The building was remodeled from 1990 to 1991.

=== Legal center ===
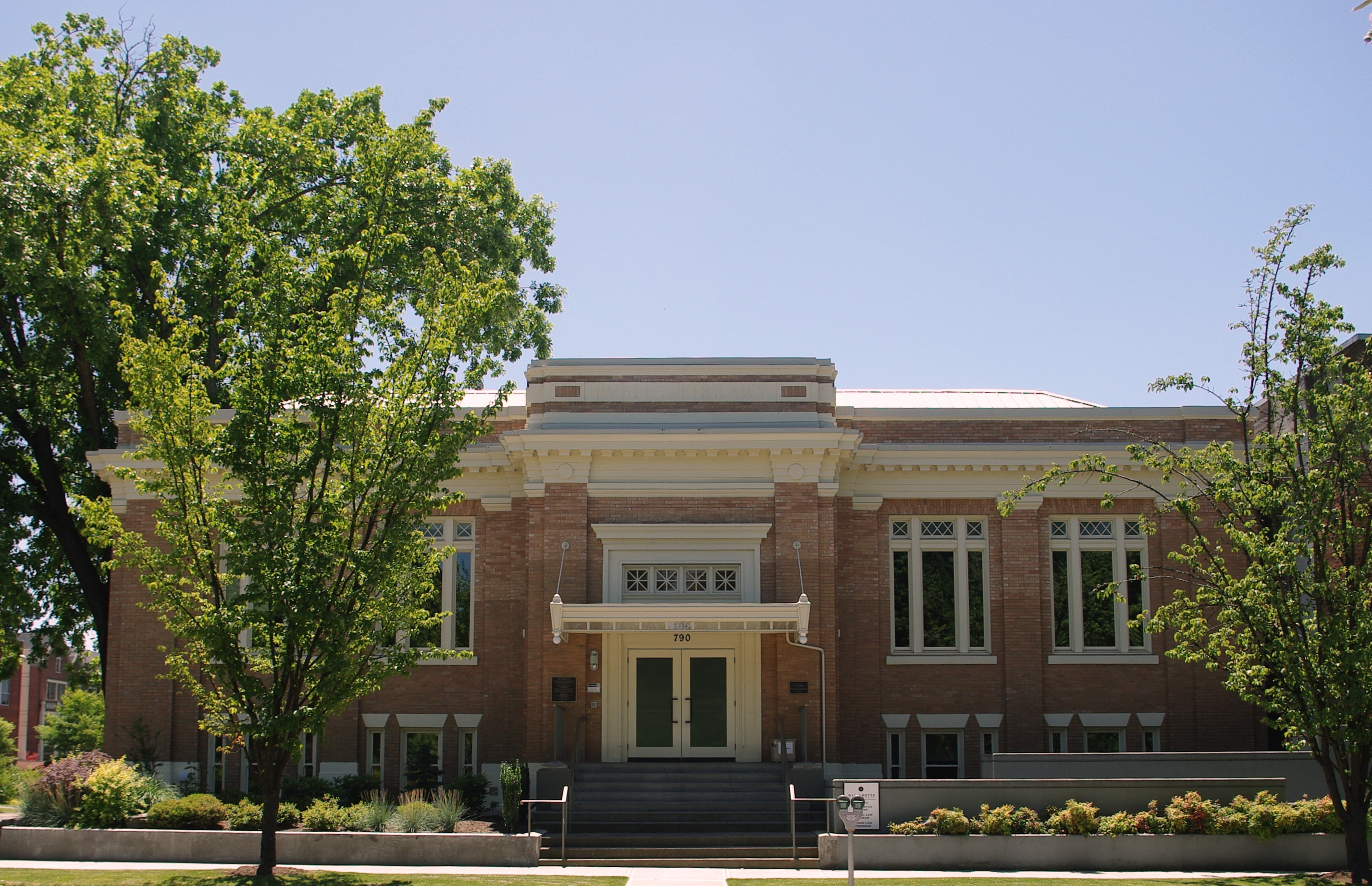
Front entrance

In 2003, Willamette University purchased the old building from the YWCA. The $1.35 million purchase included the main YWCA building adjacent to the former library for a total of 54,000 square feet (5,000 m^{2}), with the YWCA continuing their operations in the building for three years after the sale. After that group left the building in 2006, Willamette spent $4.6 million ($2 million more than originally planned) to remodel the old library building over a year's time and convert it into the Oregon Civic Justice Center as part of the College of Law. The remodeling project began in the summer of 2007 and included removing a swimming pool structure that had been added to the south of the building, while also adding a new entrance to the former library on the same side as where the pool was located. Renovations also removed a mezzanine that the YWCA had added to the upper portion of the main floor. Other renovations included new heating, cooling, and ventilation systems, upgrades for technology, all while retaining the historical look and feel of the original 1912 building.

On September 12, 2008, the building was re-dedicated exactly 96 years after the original dedication in a ceremony featuring sitting Associate Justice of the U.S. Supreme Court Ruth Bader Ginsburg. The ceremony was part of the College of Law's 125th anniversary festivities and featured Oregon dignitaries such as Oregon Supreme Court Chief Justice and Willamette alum Paul De Muniz. Willamette President M. Lee Pelton, who also attended the ceremony, selected the law school as the new tenants after other departments and programs at the school submitted proposals for the use of the old library.

== Amenities ==
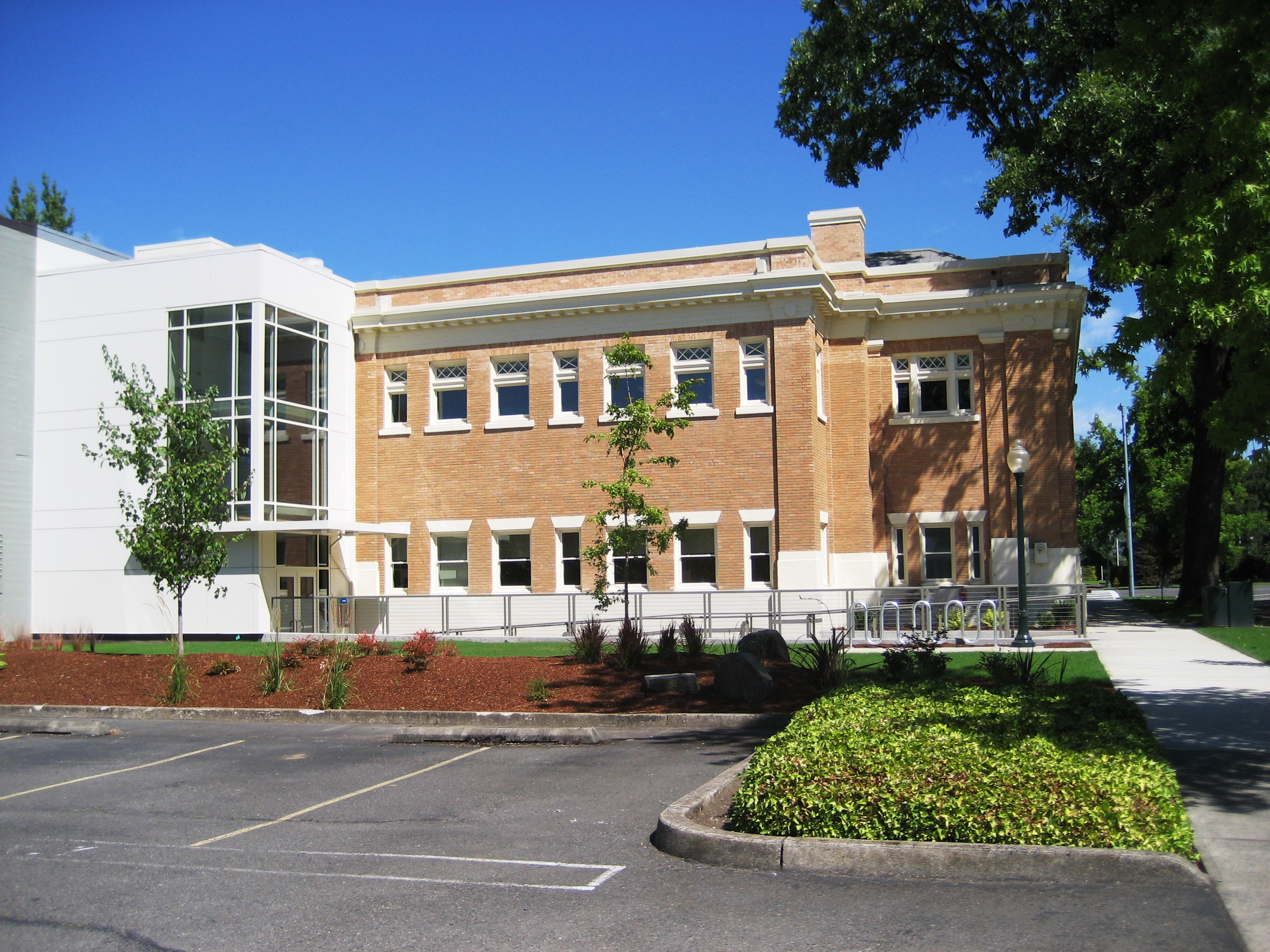
Back of the building after 2008 renovations

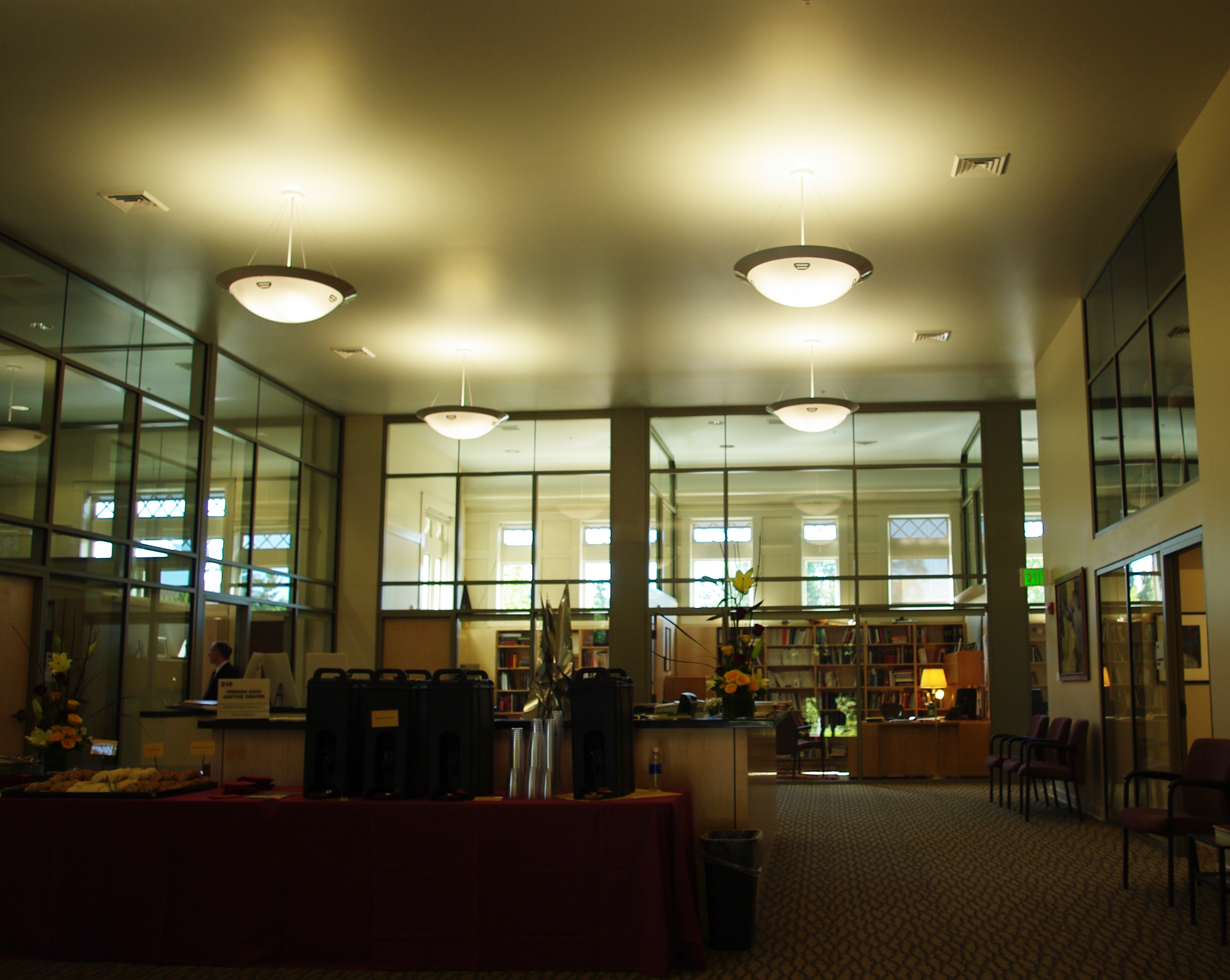
Inside the building during re-opening in September 2008

The Beaux Arts style brick structure includes a portico on the State Street entrance on the north side. The façade includes an inscription, "PUBLIC LIBRARY", in Roman type over the entryway, which is sheltered by a rigid metal awning on this north front. The roof of the square-shaped structure is constructed of both metal and tile. Stone is used for architectural accents of lintels and cornices on the exterior. The building remains connected to the neighboring former offices of the YWCA, which is a Pietro Belluschi designed building also owned by Willamette University.

Inside, the main room is a conference room on the main floor that includes a large projection system that can be used for remote feeds, such as from the state capitol across the street. A painting by John Fery is displayed over the fireplace, which the fireplace was part of the original structure in the conference room. The remainder of the interior of the building has a modern look with glass-enclosed offices surrounding an open common area. Artwork owned by the university's Hallie Ford Museum of Art is displayed in this area. The main floor of the three-story building is the second floor, which rests atop the look-out basement. A small meeting room is located above a small portion of the main floor.

== Programs ==
The center is utilized to connect the College of Law and Willamette as a whole to the larger Salem community. In this capacity, the center houses several law school programs with community outreach aspects. These include the Oregon Law Commission, the Center for Democracy, the Center for Religion and Law, the Center for Dispute Resolution, Willamette's Clinical Law Program, the Center for Law and Government, and the school's law journal, the Willamette Law Review. Each of these programs were chosen to be housed in the center due to having community outreach programs, with the goal of the center being to create a community atmosphere between students, faculty, and the community at large.
