= Santiago Ventura =

Santiago Ventura may refer to:

- Santiago Ventura Bertomeu (born 1980), professional tennis player from Spain
- Santiago Ventura Morales, Mexican national who had US murder conviction overturned
