= Craig Johnson (Alaska politician) =

American politician (1953–2026)

Member of the Alaska House of Representatives
- In office January 17, 2023 – January 21, 2025
- Preceded by: David Eastman
- Succeeded by: Chuck Kopp
- Constituency: 10th district (2023–2025)
- In office January 17, 2007 – January 2017
- Preceded by: Lesil McGuire
- Succeeded by: Chuck Kopp
- Constituency: 28th district (2007–2012); 21st district (2012–2014); 24th district (2014–2017)

Personal details
- Born: November 22, 1953 Kermit, Texas, U.S.
- Died: February 26, 2026 (aged 72)
- Party: Republican
- Spouse: Nancy

Craig W. Johnson (November 22, 1953 – February 26, 2026) was an American politician who served as a member of the Alaska House of Representatives. He originally served from 2007 to 2017 and from 2023 to 2025.

== Career ==
Johnson was elected to the House in 2006 and assumed office in 2007, representing the 28th district. He later represented the 21st and 24th district. He left office in 2017, and was succeeded by Chuck Kopp.

He was co-chair of the Resources Committee, Chair of the Cook Island Salmon Task Force, Vice-Chair of the Transportation Committee, and was a member of the State Affairs Committee, and the Fisheries Special Committee. He also served on the Administration, Corrections, Fish & Game and the Natural Resources Finance Subcommittees, for the 26th Legislature. Johnson previously served as a press secretary for the Alaska State House Majority Caucus.

== Personal life and death ==
Johnson graduated from Miami High School in Miami, Oklahoma. He attended Northeastern Oklahoma A&M College from 1973 to 1975, and Oklahoma State University from 1975 to 1977. Johnson had a wife, Nancy, and two children, Erin and Jenifer. He died on February 26, 2026, at the age of 72.

== Electoral history ==
=== 2024 ===
==== Primary ====
2024 Nonpartisan primary
Party	Candidate	Votes	%
Republican	Chuck Kopp	1,449	60.5
Republican	Craig Johnson (incumbent)	947	39.5
Total votes		2,396	100.0

==== General ====
2024 Alaska House of Representatives election, District 10
Party	Candidate	Votes	%
Republican	Chuck Kopp	4,669	61.6
Republican	Craig Johnson (incumbent)	2,811	37.1
Write-in		101	1.3
Total votes		7,581	100.0
Republican hold			
