= Stephen Bushong =

American judge (born 1958)

Justice of the Oregon Supreme Court
- Incumbent
- Assumed office January 1, 2023
- Appointed by: Kate Brown
- Preceded by: Thomas A. Balmer

Personal details
- Born: Stephen Kent Bushong; October 11, 1958 (age 66)
- Education: University of Michigan (BA, JD)

Stephen Kent Bushong (born October 11, 1958) is an American lawyer who has served as a justice of the Oregon Supreme Court since 2023.

== Education ==
Bushong received a Bachelor of Arts from the University of Michigan in 1980 and a Juris Doctor from the University of Michigan Law School in 1984.

== Career ==
From 1984 to 1985 he was a law clerk for Magistrate Judge Marc L. Goldman of the United States District Court for the Eastern District of Michigan. From 1985 to 1993, he was an associate with Miller, Nash, Wiener, Hager & Carlsen in Portland, Oregon. From 1993 to 1994, Bushong was a solo practitioner. From 1994 to 2008 he served as the Oregon Department of Justice; from 1994 to 1998 he was an assistant attorney general for the Trial Division, Special Litigation Unit, from 1998 to 2005 he was the attorney-in-charge, Special Litigation Unit and from 2005 to 2008 he was chief trial counsel. From February 2008 to 2022, Bushong served as a judge of the Multnomah County Circuit Court.

=== Oregon Supreme Court ===
On December 28, 2022, Governor Kate Brown appointed Bushong to serve as a justice of the Oregon Supreme Court to fill the vacancy left by the retirement of Justice Thomas A. Balmer. He was sworn into office by Chief Justice Meagan Flynn on January 1, 2023.

== Electoral history ==
2008 Judge of the Oregon Circuit Court, 4th District, Position 21
Party	Candidate	Votes	%
Nonpartisan	Stephen K Bushong	177,452	97.9
Write-in		3,879	2.1
Total votes		181,331	100%

2024 Judge of the Oregon Supreme Court, Position 1
Party	Candidate	Votes	%
Nonpartisan	Stephen K Bushong	1,221,817	97.9
Write-in		26,077	2.1
Total votes		1,247,894	100%

Legal offices
Preceded by Thomas A. Balmer	Justice of the Oregon Supreme Court; 2023–present	Incumbent
