= Richard Unis =

American judge

89th Justice of the Oregon Supreme Court
- In office 1990–1996
- Appointed by: Neil Goldschmidt
- Preceded by: Hans A. Linde
- Succeeded by: Ted Kulongoski

Personal details
- Born: June 11, 1928 Portland, Oregon
- Died: February 10, 2016 (aged 87) Gresham, Oregon
- Spouse: Gloria Lenore Schuster

Richard L. Unis (June 11, 1928 – February 10, 2016) was an American attorney in the state of Oregon. He was the 89th justice of the Oregon Supreme Court. Previously he was a judge for the city of Portland, a judge at the county level, and a state circuit court judge.

== Early life ==
Richard Unis was born and raised in Portland, Oregon, attending Franklin High School. After high school he attended and graduated from the University of Oregon on a basketball scholarship. On March 23, 1952, he married Gloria Lenore Schuster in Portland. In 1953, Unis graduated from the University of Oregon School of Law in Eugene, Oregon. After law school he began working at the city attorney's office in Portland.

== Judicial career ==
In 1968 Unis began serving as a municipal court judge for Portland, remaining at that position until 1971. That year the court was merged with the county district court where Unis would serve until 1976. Beginning in 1969 he began teaching at the Northwestern College of Law, while also teaching at the National Judicial College in Reno, Nevada. In January 1977 Richard Unis was appointed to the state circuit court.

On February 1, 1990, Unis was appointed to the Oregon Supreme Court by Governor Neil Goldschmidt to replace the retiring Hans A. Linde. Unis then won a full six-year term later in 1990, but resigned on June 30, 1996 before completing that term. He retired from the Supreme Court in order to take a position overseeing the settlement of a class action lawsuit against Louisiana-Pacific for problems with their siding material. Unis was appointed by United States District Judge Robert E. Jones.

== Later life and family ==
Unis was awarded the Herbert Harley Award in October 1999 for his "outstanding efforts and contributions that substantially change and improve the administration of justice in their states." This national award is presented by the American Judicature Society. In October 2003, Unis helped finalize the settlement in the Louisiana-Pacific siding lawsuits as a special master appointed by the court.

Unis died on February 10, 2016, at Legacy Mount Hood Medical Center in Gresham, Oregon, at the age of 87. He had lived in Clackamas County along the Sandy River for more than thirty years at his death.
