= Santiago Ventura Morales =

- Born: 1968 (age 57–58); Mexico
- Occupations: Migrant farm worker social worker

Santiago Ventura Morales (born 1968) is a Mexican social worker in the state of Oregon. Born in Mexico, he was falsely convicted of murder in Oregon in 1986. The conviction drew national attention when some jurors worked to overturn the conviction, and he was released from prison in 1991. He later graduated from the University of Portland.

== Early life ==
Santiago Ventura Morales was born in 1968 and grew up in San Miguel Cuevas in the Mexican state of Oaxaca where he completed school through the sixth grade. At the age of 14 in 1982, Morales left his hometown in Mexico along with five cousins. An indigenous Mexican of Mixtec heritage, he moved to the United States to work as a migrant farm worker.

== Murder conviction ==
In 1986, Morales was accused of murdering a 19-year-old migrant farm worker in an Oregon strawberry field after a fight. Ramiro Lopez Fidel was found dead on July 14, 1986, from a stabbing in Sandy, Oregon. Morales was arrested and put on trial in September. He was convicted on October 2, 1986, and sentenced to ten-years to life in prison after a trial in which he was provided a Spanish interpreter, despite the fact that as a Mixtec, Spanish was not his native language. He maintained his innocence and several jurors later had second thoughts about the conviction and began advocating that he be released from prison. Morales repeatedly appealed after the conviction, but these appeals were denied, with future Oregon Supreme Court justice Virginia Linder opposing the appeals for the state of Oregon. However, the lack of an appropriate interpreter and other deficiencies in his trial led to his conviction being overturned when it was shown that a different person was responsible for the murder.

While in prison he learned English and hoped to become a lawyer. The reinvestigation drew intense media attention locally and nationally. Paul De Muniz, who became Oregon Supreme Court Chief Justice in 2001 and retired in 2013, was Morales’ primary defense attorney on the successful appeal. On January 9, 1991, Santiago Ventura Morales was released from prison, and all charges were dropped in May. Oregon governor Neil Goldschmidt had offered a conditional pardon for Morales after the conviction was overturned in case Oregon Attorney General Dave Frohnmayer appealed the decision that overturned the conviction. In 1995, the state of Oregon passed a law that requires testing and certification of court interpreters as a result of the Morales case.

== Aftermath ==
After his release, but while waiting for the charges to be dropped, he enrolled at Portland State University in Portland, Oregon. Morales briefly returned to Mexico before moving back to Portland, where he accepted a scholarship to the University of Portland. While imprisoned he had earned his GED and taken some college level classes, which along with the injustice led to the school offering him a full-ride scholarship to the Catholic university. He graduated in May 1996 from the school with a bachelor's degree in social work and a minor in political science. The legal injustice to Morales led the Oregon Supreme Court to adopt changes in the way language issues are dealt with to avoid future problems. Morales would work in Oregon briefly before returning to Mexico. He later worked for the California Rural Legal Assistance in Fresno, California, before returning to Oregon to work at the Oregon Law Center.
