= Samuel T. Richardson =

American lawyer

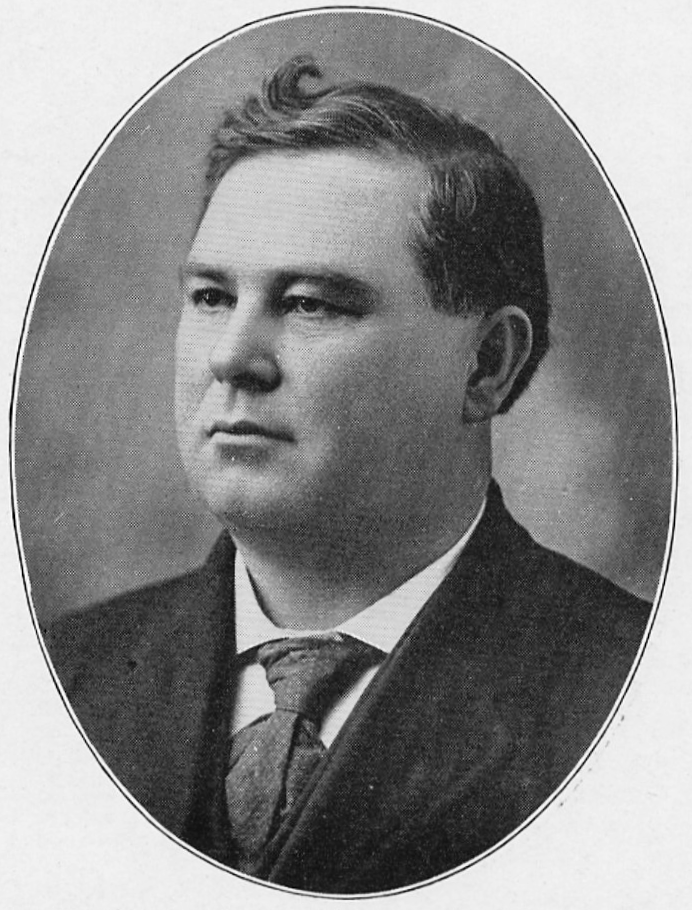
- Richardson circa 1910

3rd Dean of Willamette Law School
- In office 1891–1902
- Preceded by: George G. Bingham
- Succeeded by: John W. Reynolds

Personal details
- Born: July 8, 1857 Linn County, Oregon Territory
- Died: September 6, 1921 (aged 64) Portland, Oregon
- Spouse: Sarah I. Barnes
- Education: Willamette University College of Law
- Profession: professor of law attorney

Samuel Thurston Richardson (July 8, 1857 – September 6, 1921) was an American attorney and educator in the state of Oregon. A native of the state, he was the third dean of the Willamette University College of Law, his alma mater. He also founded the Oregon Law School (not the University of Oregon School of Law) that existed from 1902 until 1922.

== Early life ==
Samuel Richardson was born on July 8, 1857, to Lewis Clarke and Eliza Ann (née Whitely) Richardson. Born on a farm near the community of Scio in the Willamette Valley, he was educated at the local public schools of Scio. Richardson enrolled at Willamette University in Salem, Oregon, in 1873 and graduated with a bachelor of arts degree in 1892. On November 19, 1879, he married Sarah I. Barnes, and they had a three sons and one daughter. While still in school, he was admitted to the Oregon bar in October 1884.

From 1882 to 1884 he was the county clerk for Crook County in Central Oregon. While in the county seat of Prineville, he served as justice of the peace for that town. After earning his undergraduate degree he then continued at Willamette's law school and earned a bachelor of laws degree two years after his bachelor's degree. In 1889, he was hired by the Oregon Secretary of State to examine the title for land the state was preparing to buy for a reform school, and also had worked as a special investigator for the legislature. In 1895, he received a master of arts degree from the university, followed by a doctorate of laws from the law school in 1898.

== Legal career ==
Richardson joined the faculty at the Willamette University College of Law in 1887. In 1891, he became the third dean of the law school, succeeding George G. Bingham. As dean, he continued to teach constitutional law and real property law and admitted the first women to the school that was founded in 1883. Richardson was given a lifetime certificate to allow him to teach in the state in 1898 by the Oregon State Board of Education. He left Willamette's law school in 1902 and was succeeded by John W. Reynolds.

In 1902, he founded the Oregon Law School in Salem, later adding a branch in Portland. Serving as dean of the new law school, he also was the editor of the school's journal, the Oregon Law School Journal that began in 1902 as well. By 1908 the school had grown to two teachers and 27 students, and by 1910 to 47 students. While still operating the law school he also was in private legal practice, including with the Portland firm of Richardson, Dimick & Morehead starting in 1906.

== Later years ==
A Republican, he was also a member of the Independent Order of Odd Fellows and the Knights of Pythias. He served as the chairman of a state commission that studied judicial reform in 1911. This commission made several recommendations to the State Assembly, including expanding the Oregon Supreme Court from five to seven justices. The state did add two more seats to the court, and in 1914 Richardson ran for one of the new positions as a Republican, losing in the primary. He continued practicing law with clients such as the Wentworth Lumber Company into the 1920s. Samuel Thurston Richardson died on September 6, 1921, of a stroke at the age of 64 in Portland, and was buried in Salem. After his death, the Oregon Law School closed.

Academic offices
Preceded by George G. Bingham	Dean of Willamette University College of Law; 1891–1902	Succeeded by John W. Reynolds
