= Wallace P. Carson Jr. =

American judge (born 1934)

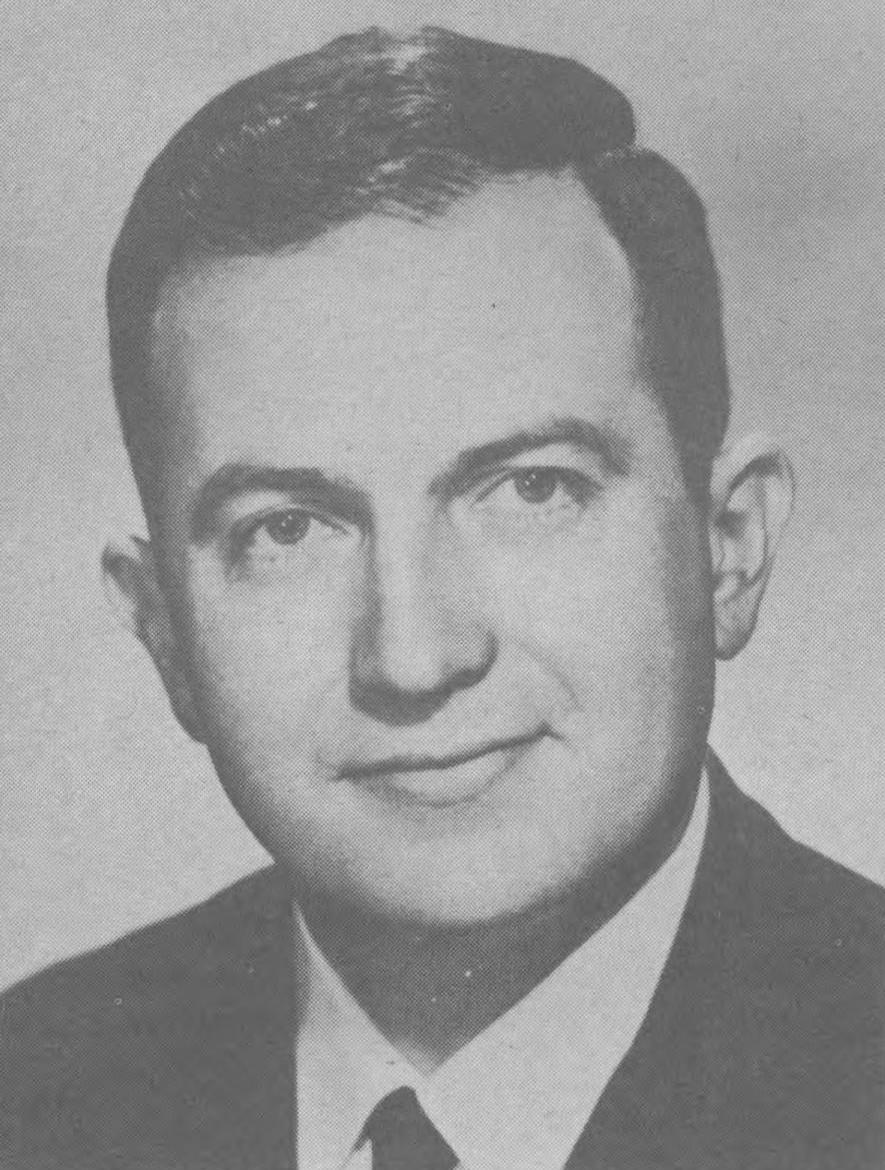

40th Chief Justice of the Oregon Supreme Court
- In office 1991–2005
- Preceded by: Edwin J. Peterson
- Succeeded by: Paul De Muniz

84th Justice of the Oregon Supreme Court
- In office 1982–2006
- Appointed by: Victor G. Atiyeh
- Preceded by: Arno H. Denecke
- Succeeded by: Virginia Linder

Personal details
- Born: June 10, 1934 (age 92) Salem, Oregon

Wallace Preston Carson Jr. (born June 10, 1934) is an American attorney and politician from Oregon. He has spent time in both of Oregon's legislative branches and served on the Oregon Supreme Court for 24 years. Carson's fourteen-year tenure as chief justice was longer than that of any of his predecessors.

== Early life ==
Wallace P. Carson Jr. was born June 10, 1934; he was raised in Salem, where his grandfather had started a law firm in 1889. He graduated from Salem High School (now North Salem High School) in 1952. Wallace graduated from Stanford University in Palo Alto, California with a Bachelor of Arts in 1956 where he was a brother of Phi Delta Theta. At Stanford he was in the Reserve Officer Training Corps (ROTC), which led to a commission in the United States Air Force. Carson Jr. then enrolled in Willamette University's law school, graduating with his Juris Doctor in 1962.

After graduation, he spent three years on active duty in the Air Force. Overall Carson Jr. was in the armed forces for 34 years, many with the Air Force Reserve and Oregon Air National Guard. While serving in the military he rose to the rank of brigadier general while serving as a Judge Advocate General's Corps (JAG) officer, ground control intercept officer, and jet pilot. This service took him to places such as Korea and Taiwan. Wallace P. Carson Jr. was in private legal practice from 1962 to 1977.

== Political career ==
While still serving in the military and working in private practice, Wallace Carson was invited by Oregon Republican politician Bob Packwood to run for a seat in the Oregon House of Representatives in 1966. There he served two terms, including one as majority leader. Then he was elected in 1970 to the Oregon State Senate, and re-elected in 1974. He served as minority floor leader during his second term.

=== Judicial service ===
Carson began his career in the judicial branch of government following his years in the legislature with an appointment to the Marion County Circuit Court by Governor Robert W. Straub in 1977. Governor Vic Atiyeh appointed him to replace Justice Denecke on the Oregon Supreme Court in July 1982, he was elected to a full six-year term in November of that year, and he was re-elected in 1988, 1994, and 2000. He was chairman of the Oregon Appellate Judges Association from 1989 to 1991.

Carson's fellow justices chose him to serve as chief justice from 1991 to 2005. He was the longest serving Chief Justice in Oregon's history, and about 94% of the decisions issued by the court under his tenure were unanimous decisions. While on the court he served as chairperson of the Commission on Appellate Court Performance Standards for the National Center for State Courts. Carson did not seek re-election in 2006. Virginia Linder was elected to the position he vacated.

== Personal life ==
Carson has served on the Board of Trustees of Willamette University since 1970. He is currently a senior judge for the state, subject to temporary assignment as a judge on any court in the Oregon Judicial Department. He has been married to his wife, the former Gloria Stalk, for over 50 years. She was a year behind him in high school, and they met at a local pool, where he was swimming and she had been playing tennis.
