= John W. Reynolds (Oregon attorney) =

American lawyer

- Reynolds in 1903

4th Dean of Willamette Law School
- In office 1903–1908
- Preceded by: Samuel T. Richardson
- Succeeded by: Charles L. McNary

Personal details
- Born: 27 January 1875 Salem, Oregon, U.S.
- Died: 5 April 1942 (aged 67) Portland, Oregon, U.S.
- Spouse: Nettie Beckner
- Education: Willamette University; University of Michigan Law School
- Profession: professor of law attorney

John W. Reynolds (27 January 1875 – 5 April 1942) was an American attorney and educator in the U.S. state of Oregon. A native of the state, he was the fourth dean of the Willamette University College of Law, the law school of his alma mater.

== Early life ==
John Reynolds was born in Salem, Oregon, to John and Sallie A. (née Truesdell) Reynolds on 27 January 1875. His father was a physician originally from Ohio. The younger Reynolds earned his education at the public schools in Salem before enrolling at Willamette University, also in Salem. He graduated with a Bachelor of Arts degree from the university in 1895, and then earned a masters of arts degree from Willamette in 1897. Reynolds continued his education at the University of Michigan where he earned a bachelor of laws degree from their law school in 1899. On May 6, 1908, he married Nettie Beckner.

== Legal career ==
Reynolds was admitted to the Oregon bar in June 1897 in Salem. He started practicing law in Salem in September 1899 after law school, and continued there in private practice until June 1907. While still in private practice he became the dean of the Willamette University College of Law in June 1903. He succeeded Samuel T. Richardson as the dean and also served on the board of trustees of the larger institution.

During his tenure the university's administration questioned whether the law school should continue to exist, as only four students earned degrees in a four-year period. Reynolds was the fourth dean of the school, and served until 1908 when Charles L. McNary became the new dean. In June 1907, he left Willamette and moved to Portland to continue practicing, and continued in practice there until his death. Reynolds left the Willamette University Board of Trustees in June 1908. Starting in June 1909 he was in a partnership with A. F. Flegel with the law firm name of Flegel & Reynolds. He was a member of the Republican Party, but did not hold public office.

== Later years ==
Reynolds was a partner in the firm Reynolds, Flegel, and Smith in the 1940s. He was a member of the board of trustees for the Centenary-Wilbur Methodist Church in Portland as well as a member of the Sons of the American Revolution. John Reynolds died of pneumonia in Portland on Easter Sunday, 5 April 1942, at the age of 67, and was entombed at Riverview Cemetery in Portland.

Academic offices
| Preceded by Samuel T. Richardson | Dean of Willamette University College of Law; 1903–1908 | Succeeded by Charles L. McNary |
