= Lynn Nakamoto =

American judge (born 1960)

Justice of the Oregon Supreme Court
- In office January 4, 2016 – December 31, 2021
- Appointed by: Kate Brown
- Preceded by: Virginia Linder
- Succeeded by: Roger DeHoog

Judge of the Oregon Court of Appeals
- In office January 3, 2011 – January 4, 2016
- Appointed by: Ted Kulongoski
- Preceded by: Jack Landau
- Succeeded by: Roger DeHoog

Personal details
- Born: May 24, 1960 (age 66) Los Angeles, California, U.S.
- Children: 1
- Education: Wellesley College (BA); New York University (JD)

Lynn R. Nakamoto (born May 24, 1960) is an American judge who is a former justice of the Oregon Supreme Court. She was appointed to the court by Governor Kate Brown, and previously served on the Oregon Court of Appeals from 2011 to 2016.

== Early life and education ==
Nakamoto was born in Los Angeles and grew up in Orange County, California. Nakamoto, who is the first member of her family to graduate college, received a Bachelor of Arts in philosophy with honors from Wellesley College in 1982. She then earned her Juris Doctor degree in 1985 at New York University School of Law.

== Career ==
From 1985 to 1987, she worked at Bronx Legal Services in New York City before moving to Oregon in 1987, when she became a staff attorney and acting director of Marion-Polk Legal Aid Service. In 1989, she joined Markowitz, Herbold, Glade & Mehlhaf, a Portland law firm focusing on business litigation, eventually becoming its managing shareholder. She worked there until her appointment to the bench in 2011.

She served as vice chair of the Oregon Board of Bar Examiners in 2001 and chair of the Oregon State Bar's affirmative action committee in 2006.

The Oregon Asian Pacific American Bar Association (OAPABA) presents an award called the Lynn Nakamoto Award at its annual gala dinner.

== Judicial service ==
In 1989, Nakamoto had served as a summer clerk for United States District Judge Helen J. Frye.

In 2011, Governor Ted Kulongoski appointed Nakamoto to the Oregon Court of Appeals, to fill the seat created by Jack Landau's appointment to the Oregon Supreme Court. She was elected unopposed to a six-year term at the 2012 election.

In 2015, Governor Kate Brown named Nakamoto to the Oregon Supreme Court, to fill the vacancy created by Virginia Linder's retirement. Nakamoto is of Japanese descent, and her appointment made her the first Asian American to serve on the supreme court. Nakamoto retired from the court on December 31, 2021.

== Personal life ==
Nakamoto was a founding member of the Oregon Minority Lawyers Association and sat on the board of the Q Center, an LGBT community center in North Portland.

Nakamoto is a lesbian. In 2021, she was one of twelve openly LGBT state supreme court justices serving in the United States at that time. Nakamoto and her partner have a daughter named Eleanor adopted from Vietnam.

== See also ==
- List of Asian American jurists
- List of LGBT jurists in the United States
- List of LGBT people from Portland, Oregon
- List of LGBT state supreme court justices in the United States

Legal offices
Preceded by Virginia Linder	Justice of the Oregon Supreme Court; 2016–2021	Succeeded by Roger DeHoog
