= Roger DeHoog =

American judge (born 1965)

Justice of the Oregon Supreme Court
- Incumbent
- Assumed office January 19, 2022
- Appointed by: Kate Brown
- Preceded by: Lynn Nakamoto

Personal details
- Born: 1965 or 1966 (age 60–61)
- Education: Dartmouth College (BA); University of Oregon (JD)

Roger DeHoog (born 1965) is an American lawyer and judge from Oregon who is a justice of the Oregon Supreme Court. He served as a judge of the Oregon Court of Appeals from 2016 to 2022.

== Education ==
DeHoog received his Bachelor of Arts from Dartmouth College and his Juris Doctor from the University of Oregon School of Law.

== Legal career ==
DeHoog served as a public defender in Deschutes County, Oregon, from 1993 to 2000. He was in private practice in Bend from 2000 to 2007. From 2007 to 2016, he served in the special litigation unit of the Oregon Department of Justice.

== Judicial career ==
From 2012 to 2015, DeHoog served as a judge of the Deschutes County Circuit Court. He was then appointed to the Oregon Court of Appeals in 2015.

=== Appointment to Oregon Supreme Court ===
On January 19, 2022, governor Kate Brown appointed DeHoog to be a justice of the Oregon Supreme Court to fill the vacancy left by the retirement of Justice Lynn Nakamoto. He is the second Asian Pacific American to be appointed to the supreme court.

== See also ==
- List of Asian American jurists

Legal offices
Preceded by Lynn Nakamoto	Justice of the Oregon Supreme Court; 2022–present	Incumbent
