= George G. Bingham =

American lawyer

2nd Dean of Willamette Law School
- In office 1888–1891
- Preceded by: William Marion Ramsey
- Succeeded by: Samuel T. Richardson

Judge of the Oregon Circuit Court
- In office 1917–1924

Personal details
- Born: November 25, 1855 West Salem, Wisconsin
- Died: October 4, 1924 (aged 68) Portland, Oregon
- Spouse: Willie E. Harris
- Education: University of Michigan Law School
- Profession: professor of law attorney

George Greenwood Bingham (November 25, 1855 – October 4, 1924) was an American judge and legal educator in the state of Oregon. A native of Wisconsin, he migrated to Oregon with his family in his teens, though he returned to the Midwest for his legal education. Bingham served as the second dean at the Willamette University College of Law and was also a judge for Multnomah County after previously serving as a district attorney for Salem and the state. His former home in Salem, the Dr. Luke A. Port House, is listed on the National Register of Historic Places.

== Early life ==
George Bingham was born in West Salem, Wisconsin, on November 25, 1855, to William Henry Bingham and Maria Bingham (née Kentner) as the first of four children. The family moved to neighboring Barre by 1860 and to Carrollton, Missouri, by 1870. In 1872, the family moved to Oregon and settled in Yamhill County. After receiving his education in the public schools of Yamhill County, he attended what became Linfield College in McMinnville. Bingham attended the University of Michigan Law School in Ann Arbor where he graduated with a bachelor of laws degree in 1880.

== Legal career ==
In 1880, he returned to Oregon and passed the bar, setting up legal practice in Lafayette back in Yamhill County with James McCain. After a year he moved to the county’s seat, McMinnville, and practiced law there until 1885. In 1883, he formed a legal partnership with William Marion Ramsey, which lasted until 1887. He was elected as the county coroner in 1884.

Bingham moved to Salem in 1885, following Ramsey. Ramsey was named the first Dean of Willamette University College of Law, which Bingham became the second in 1888, serving until 1891. Bingham then continued to teach at the school for thirty years. He was the chief of Salem’s fire department in 1889. In 1890, he formed a new partnership with P. H. D’Arcy, lasting until 1894. Bingham also worked as the city attorney for Salem.

Also in 1890, he was elected to serve as the district attorney for Oregon’s Third Judicial District. He had previously been the district attorney for the city. In January 1908, he was considered the top candidate to be appointed as the United States Attorney for Oregon, as he was the favorite of three out of the four members of Oregon's Congressional delegation. However, President Theodore Roosevelt had made it clear to the delegation that he would not appoint anyone with any connections to the defendants in the Oregon land fraud scandal or ties to corporations. Bingham had been the attorney for the Southern Pacific railroad in Salem, and thus was dropped for consideration the next month, with Thomas J. Cleeton appointed to the position.

A Republican, he was elected to serve as a judge on the Circuit Court for Marion and Linn counties on November 7, 1916, and began service in 1917. While on the court in 1921, he ruled with judge Percy R. Kelly that Oregon’s compulsory sterilization law was unconstitutional. In 1922, he gained national attention while presiding over the Richard Brumfield murder trial in Roseburg. He also suffered a stroke and temporary paralysis prior to the start of that trial. Also that year he was re-elected to a second term on the court. In 1924, he temporarily moved to Portland where he served on the Multnomah County Circuit Court to assist that court. He was known as an expert on corporation law and immigration law.

== Later years and family ==
On November 6, 1882, Bingham married Willie E. Harris in McMinnville, and they had one daughter. In 1895, Bingham purchased Deepwood Estate on Mission Street, now listed on the National Register of Historic Places. The Queen Anne style home is part of the Deepwood Estate next to Bush's Pasture Park. Bingham added gardens and an orchard to the estate.

Bingham was a member of both the Masonic Order and the Benevolent and Protective Order of Elks. He also served as president of the Bank of Woodburn. On September 25, 1924, he suffered a stroke while in court in Portland and was hospitalized at the Portland Medical Hospital. George Greenwood Bingham died on October 4, 1924, at the age of 68 at the hospital of a heart attack. The family sold the Port home after both George and Willie died in 1924.

Academic offices
Preceded by William Marion Ramsey	Dean of Willamette University College of Law; 1888–1891	Succeeded by Samuel T. Richardson
