= Paul De Muniz =

American judge (born 1947)

Paul J. De Muniz
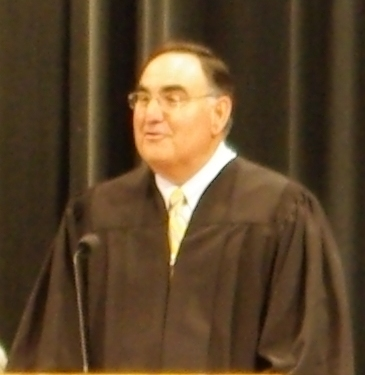
- Paul De Muniz in 2009

41st Chief Justice of the Oregon Supreme Court
- In office 2006–2012
- Preceded by: Wallace P. Carson, Jr.
- Succeeded by: Thomas A. Balmer

95th Justice of the Oregon Supreme Court
- In office 2001–2013
- Preceded by: George Van Hoomissen
- Succeeded by: David V. Brewer

Judge on the Oregon Court of Appeals
- In office 1990–2000
- Appointed by: Neil Goldschmidt
- Preceded by: Susan P. Graber
- Succeeded by: David Schuman

Personal details
- Born: June 8, 1947 (age 79) Glendale, California
- Spouse: Mary De Muniz

Military service
- Allegiance: United States
- Branch/service: United States Air Force
- Years of service: 1965-1968
- Battles/wars: Vietnam War

Paul J. De Muniz (born June 8, 1947) is a retired American judge in the state of Oregon. He is the first Hispanic Chief Justice in the history of the Oregon Supreme Court. He was elected to the court in 2000, and elected as chief justice in 2006. He won re-election in May 2006 for another six-year term on the state's highest court. De Muniz previously served on the Oregon Court of Appeals for ten years.

== Early life ==
Born on June 8, 1947, in Glendale, California, De Muniz's family lived there until Paul turned six when the family relocated to Portland, Oregon. In Portland, he attended Harvey Scott Elementary in the Roseway Neighborhood and graduated from Madison High School in Northeast Portland. After graduating from high school in 1965 De Muniz served time in the Air Force, including time in Vietnam during the war. De Muniz enrolled at Portland State University, graduating with a Bachelor of Science in 1972. He completed his education in 1975 after graduating from Willamette University College of Law in Salem with a JD. At Willamette he was an associate editor of the school's law review publication.

== Legal career ==
After law school, De Muniz began a public legal career as a state deputy public defender and later as a special prosecutor for Douglas County, Oregon. He also was in private practice in Salem at the firm of Garrett, Seideman, Hemann, Robertson & De Muniz. While in private practice, De Muniz was the primary attorney responsible for working to overturn the conviction of Santiago Ventura Morales’ murder conviction. Morales, a migrant farm worker from Mexico, was convicted in 1986 of killing a fellow farm worker. He was only given a Spanish interpreter to assist in the language barrier, however his primary language was Mixtec. On appeal it was shown that Morales was not the killer and he was released in a national watched incident. After release Morales was given a scholarship to the University of Portland and graduated with a degree in social work.

In 1990, De Muniz was appointed to Oregon Court of Appeals by Oregon's governor, and then won election to a full six-year term on the court in November of that year. He served on the Court of Appeals from 1990 to 2000, when in 2000 he was elected to the Oregon Supreme Court to fill an open seat on the court vacated when George Van Hoomissen retired. De Muniz' term began in 2001 when he became the state's first Latino Supreme Court justice, and in 2006 he was elected chief justice. Upon joining the court, he became the first Latino member in the court's history. In November 2005, he was unanimously elected by his fellow court members to a six-year term as chief justice to replace Wallace P. Carson, Jr. who vacated the top position on the court. De Muniz announced in October 2011 that he would not run for re-election in 2012 and would leave at the end of his term in January 2013.

== Consulting work ==
De Muniz registered as an insurance industry lobbyist five months after his retirement from the bench. In November 2014, he was hired by a group of Chicago-area academics who had won a contract to monitor settlement of the United States v. City of Portland case. After considerable public criticism De Muniz resigned the position in April 2015.

== Other ==
Paul De Muniz is an adjunct professor of law at Willamette University College of Law where he was mentor of the year in 1997. He previously taught at the National Judicial College in Reno, Nevada. He is married to Mary and has three children; Carrie, Peter and Michael. De Muniz has chaired the Sakhalin/Oregon Rule of Law partnership and served on the Judicial Fitness and Disability Commission, the Oregon State Bar's Board of Bar Examiners, the Supreme Court Access to Justice for All Committee, and the Oregon Criminal Justice Council.

== Works authored ==
- A Practical Guide to Oregon Criminal Procedure and Practice, Templeton Press, 2005.
- "Eroding the Public's Confidence in Judicial Impartiality: First Amendment Federal Jurisprudence and Special Interest Financing of Judicial Campaigns", 67 Albany Law Review 763, 2004.
- "Politicizing State Judicial Elections: A Threat to Judicial Independence", 38 Willamette Law Review 367, 2002.

== See also ==
- List of Hispanic and Latino American jurists
