= Willamette University College of Law =

Private law school in Salem, Oregon, US

Willamette University School of Law
- Motto: Non nobis solum nati sumus
- Parent school: Willamette University
- Established: 1883; 143 years ago
- School type: Private
- Parent endowment: US$285 million
- Dean: Jeffrey Dobbins
- Location: Salem, Oregon, United States; 44°56′13″N 123°02′01″W
- Enrollment: 332 (2022)
- Faculty: 55 (2022)
- USNWR ranking: 168th (tie) (2026)
- Bar pass rate: 72% (2022)
- Website: willamette.edu/academics/law/
- ABA profile: Willamette University College of Law Profile

The Willamette University School of Law (previously known as the Willamette University College of Law) is the law school of Willamette University. Located in Salem, Oregon, United States, and founded in 1883, Willamette is the oldest law school in the Pacific Northwest. It has approximately 29 full-time law professors and enrolls about 332 students, with 120 of those enrolled in their first year of law school. The campus is located across the street from the Oregon State Capitol and the Oregon Supreme Court Building; the College is located in the Truman Wesley Collins Legal Center.

It offers both full-time and part-time enrollment for the Doctor of Jurisprudence (J.D.) degree, joint-degree programs, a Master's of Legal Studies (MLS) program, and a Master of Laws (LL.M.) program. The joint-degree programs allow students to earn both a J.D. and a Master of Business Administration (M.B.A.) concurrently in a four-year program, or complete a bachelor's degree and J.D. in six years. Willamette Law's oldest legal journal is the Willamette Law Review, which started in 1960 and is housed in the Oregon Civic Justice Center. According to Willamette's 2022 ABA-required disclosures, 84.69% of the Class of 2022 obtained full-time, long-term, JD-required or JD-preferred employment nine months after graduation.

== History ==
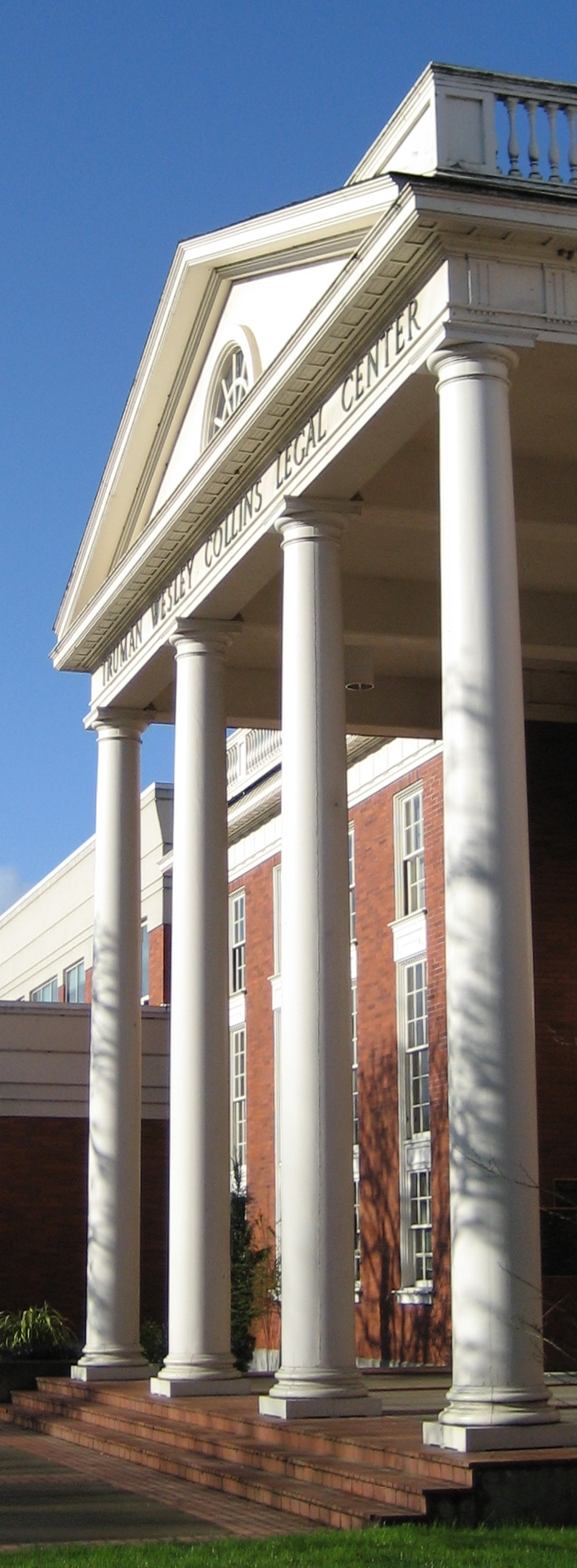
Main entrance to Truman Wesley Collins Legal Center

=== Founding and early years ===
In July 1866, Willamette University's trustees formed a committee to explore the possibility of a legal department. At that time, legal education was traditionally taught as an apprenticeship in which those wishing to be lawyers would study under an existing attorney for several years before being allowed to pass the bar. Although the school did not begin a legal department in 1866, Willamette did confer a Doctor of Laws degree on Matthew P. Deady, who later helped establish the University of Oregon School of Law, Oregon's second law school.

The College of Law was founded in 1883, and it is the oldest law school in the Pacific Northwest. In April 1884, the Board of Trustees officially approved the new legal department; tuition for the two-year course was $50 per year. William Marion Ramsey served as the school's first dean. He was dean from 1883 until 1888 and led a faculty of three. The three professors were George H. Burnett, who taught contracts, commercial law, and torts; J. T. Gregg, who taught evidence and common law; and William H. Holmes, who was the instructor for admiralty and criminal law.

The school's first entering class had three students, with Charles A. Packenham as the first graduate in 1886. In addition to being the oldest law school in Oregon and the Pacific Northwest, Willamette College of Law was the 75th law school founded in the United States, and is the second oldest in the Western U.S., behind Hastings College of Law in California. From its founding until 1923, the law school was located in Waller Hall.

During the early years of the law school, enrollment fluctuated from as many as 17 graduates in 1898 to as few as zero graduates in 1903 and 1905. Dean Ramsey resigned in 1888 and was replaced by George G. Bingham, who served until 1891 when replaced by his pupil Samuel T. Richardson. Women were allowed to enroll beginning in 1892; in 1898, the first women, Olive S. England and Gabrielle Clark, graduated. The third female graduate, in 1899, was Anna Carson, who was part of the Carson legal family of Salem that includes Wallace P. Carson (1923 graduate) a state legislator and Wallace P. Carson, Jr. (1962 graduate) a state legislator and longtime chief justice of the Oregon Supreme Court.

=== 20th century stability and ABA accreditation ===
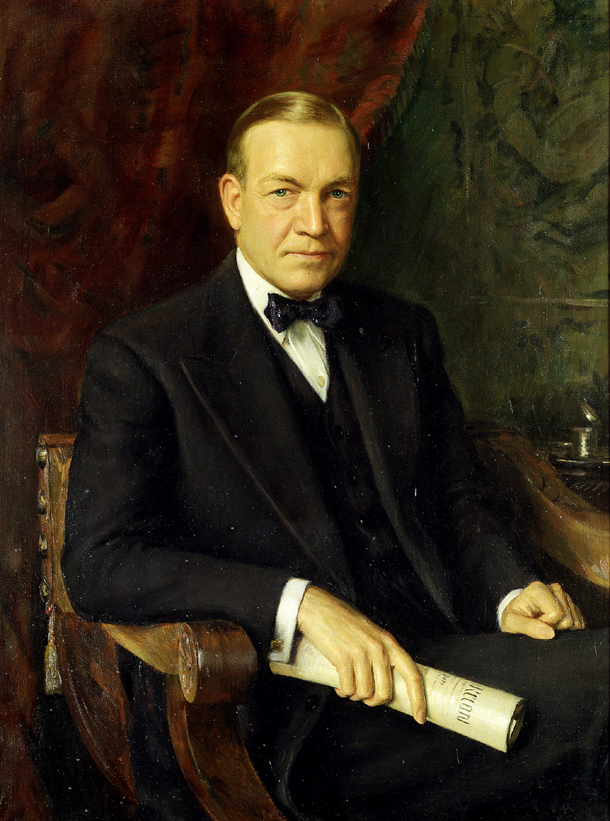
Charles L. McNary, dean from 1908 to 1913.

In 1902, Dean Richardson left the school and was replaced by John W. Reynolds who served until 1907. In 1908, Charles L. McNary was appointed dean, serving until 1913, when Willamette selected future Oregon Attorney General Isaac Homer Van Winkle. Van Winkle was an alumnus of both Willamette and the law school, serving as dean until 1927.

From 1923 until 1938, the school was located in Eaton Hall. Roy R. Hewitt was dean from 1927 to 1932, followed by Roy Lockenour, who served until 1939. Willamette Law was first accredited by the American Bar Association in 1938, and in 1946, it became a member of the Association of American Law Schools. In 1938, the school moved to Gatke Hall, a former United States Post Office. The law school was housed there until 1967.

=== Mid-century growth and Lady Justice ===
During this time, deans of the law school included George M. McLeod (1940–1942), Ray L. Smith (1942–1946), and Seward P. Reese (1946–1968). During World War II, enrollment declined to only five graduates between 1943 and 1945, and classes were moved to the undergraduate library as the United States Navy used Gatke Hall. In 1946, enrollment rebounded with a total of 92 students, the largest student body of the law school up to that date.

After 1952, Willamette Law received a large Lady Justice statue when the Marion County Courthouse was demolished to make way for a new one. In 1959, the school founded its first law review, the Willamette Law Review. Enrollment continued to increase reaching a class size of 185 by the mid-1960s; because of this increase, the College of Law Foundation was created by the university's trustees in 1959 to explore the construction of a new facility. Willamette transitioned from awarding the bachelor of laws degree to the now-standard U.S. law school Juris Doctor beginning in 1965.

=== Collins Legal Center and Civic Justice Center ===
In 1967, a new $1.1 million facility, the Truman Wesley Collins Legal Center, opened in September. The College of Law moved across campus to the Collins Legal Center along with Lady Justice, the 12-foot (3.7 m)-tall, 300-pound (140 kg) statue formerly located on the roof of the Marion County Courthouse. James L. Malone served as dean from 1967–1968, succeeded by Arthur B. Custy who became dean and served until 1971. During Custy's deanship the admissions standards changed at Willamette to require a bachelor's degree and taking the Law School Admission Test. Later deans of the school included Larry K. Harvey (1971–1977) and Leroy Tornquist (1979–1987). In 1984, the law school established the Center for Dispute Resolution, an alternative dispute resolution program.

=== 21st century ===
In 2008, the school opened the Oregon Civic Justice Center to house programs including the Center for Dispute Resolution, the Clinical Law Program, Center for Law and Government, and the Willamette Law Review. Willamette admitted part-time students for the first time for fall 2012, and since then, has added joint degree 3+3 Programs with Willamette College, Portland State University, Western Oregon University, and the University of Alaska Anchorage. With the 3+3 Program, students spend three years working on their bachelor's degree at those institutions, finishing their fourth year electives as a first year student at Willamette Law.

=== Leadership ===
Deans of the school in recent years include David R. Kenagy (1994–1996 interim), Robert M. Ackerman (1996–1999), Symeon Symeonides (1999 to 2011), Curtis Bridgeman (2013-2020), and Brian Gallini (2020-2024). In 2025, Jeffrey Dobbins was named as the school's 23rd Dean, after serving as Interim Dean beginning in the Fall of 2024.

== Academics ==
=== Admissions ===
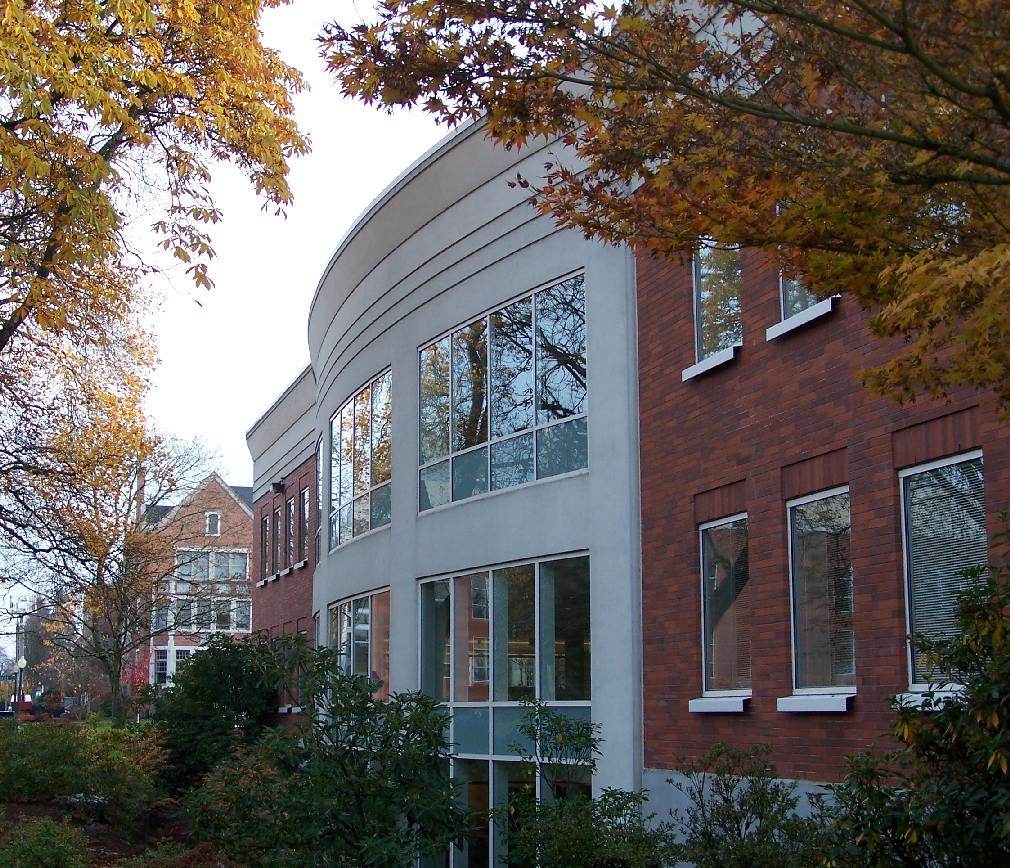
Exterior of the J. W. Long Law Library, 2006

The School of Law offers full-time and part-time enrollment for its JD program, with no application deadline for the JD program. In 2016, the school accepted 74% of all applicants who applied to the school. Enrolled students from that entering class had Law School Admission Test (LSAT) scores in the range of 148 to 155 (25th–75th percentile) and a median score of 151. In 2007 and 2010, U.S. News & World Report ranked the school in their Third Tier, while in 2008, the school was ranked sixth by The Princeton Review in the "Most Welcoming of Older Students" category. As of 2017, Willamette was ranked as the 142nd best law school by U.S. News & World Report.

=== Programs ===
The JD program has both a traditional three-year, full-time curriculum or a part-time day program that can take a maximum of six years. Students' initial enrollment can only begin with the fall term each year. Through a partnership between the School of Law and Willamette's Atkinson Graduate School of Management, a joint degree program is offered to students interested in earning both a JD and an MBA concurrently. The program allows students to earn both degrees in four years instead of five years if completed separately. The business portion of the program is accredited through the Association to Advance Collegiate Schools of Business and the National Association of Schools of Public Affairs and Administration, while the law portion, along with the entire law school, is accredited by the American Bar Association.

The school also offers five 3+3 Programs to allow students to earn both an undergraduate degree and law degree in a total of six years. Through partnerships with Willamette College, Portland State University, Western Oregon University, and the University of Alaska Anchorage, students can earn a bachelor's degree and a law degree in six years, amounting to a decrease of one year from the standard seven years combined to earn both a bachelor and law degree. Both JD and joint degree students can enroll in the certificate programs, studying abroad, and working at the Clinical Law Program, and taking classes from the Center for Dispute Resolution.

The Center for Dispute Resolution, founded in 1983, offers coursework in the areas of arbitration, negotiation and mediation. In 2006, the Dispute Resolution program was ranked 7th by U.S. News & World Report.

A Clinical Law Program gives law students hands-on, professional experience in law offices and courtrooms across the country. The program consists of three advanced legal clinics, including Immigration Law, Trusts and Estates Law, and Criminal Defense Law.

Students have the opportunity to participate in study abroad programs in Germany and Ecuador. The Ecuador program began in 1995, and in 2002, Germany was added.

=== LLM ===
The LLM (Master of Laws) in Transnational Law educates law students on international law topics such as international business transactions, comparative law, and private international law. Another LLM program covers Dispute Resolution. Both LLM tracks allow students to enroll in classes at the Atkinson Graduate School of Management. LLM students can attend either full-time or part-time, but they must complete the 26-credit-hour program within two academic years.

=== MLS ===
The College also offers a Master of Legal Studies (MLS) program. This one-year program is designed for professionals whose job involves working within a legal or regulatory framework. MLS students work with a law school advisor to develop a set of courses to meet their specific career needs or goals. The MLS is not intended to prepare students for the JD program or to sit for the bar examination.

=== Certificate programs ===
The law school offers six certificate programs for students in both the JD program and the joint degree program: Advocacy and Dispute Resolution, Business Law, Environmental Law Justice and Sustainability, Health Law, International Law, and Law and Government. The business law, law and government, and international and comparative law certificate programs were introduced to the curriculum in 2002. These programs allow students to specialize in those areas of study and earn a certificate demonstrating that specialization.

== Law journals ==
Law Reviews published by the School of Law include:

- The Willamette Environmental Law Journal is an online-only journal which began publication in summer 2012 and is published twice per year.
- The Willamette Journal of International Law and Dispute Resolution began publication in 1992 with a focus on dispute resolution and the law on the international level.
- The Willamette Journal of Social Justice and Equity is the first social justice law-oriented journal in Oregon. The Journal of Social Justice was organized in 2016 with plans to begin publication in winter 2017. The first issue was released in January 2018.
- Willamette Law Review is the flagship law review at the School of Law. Publication began in 1959 with four issues published each year. By 2020, the journal had switched to publishing three issues each year, discontinuing the summer issue. This student-run general interest law review also sponsors an annual symposium at the law school.
- The Willamette Sports Law Journal was the first journal on sports law in the Pacific Northwest. This student-edited journal was published from 2004 through Spring of 2016 after which it disbanded as a student organization.

Willamette University School of Law also produces the Willamette Lawyer and Willamette Law Online. The Willamette Lawyer is the school's alumni magazine, published once annually in the fall. Willamette Law Online is a subscription service produced primarily by students that provides case summaries free to legal professionals in the Pacific Northwest.

== Facilities ==
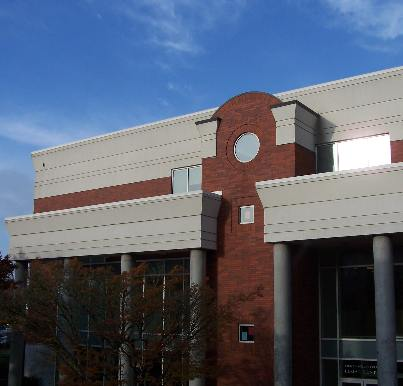
Collins Legal Center

Willamette's School of Law is primarily housed in the Truman Wesley Collins Legal Center (Collins Legal Center).

=== Oregon Civic Justice Center ===
Opened in 2008, the Oregon Civic Justice Center is one block north of the Collins Legal Center. Built within Salem's 1912 Carnegie library building, the school remodeled the structure at a cost of $4 million. The building is home to the Willamette Law Review; Willamette's Center for Democracy, Religion and Law; the Center for Dispute Resolution; the law school's Clinical Program; and the Center for Law and Government. These programs were chosen due to their community outreach programs, as the school plans to create a community atmosphere between students, faculty, and the general community.

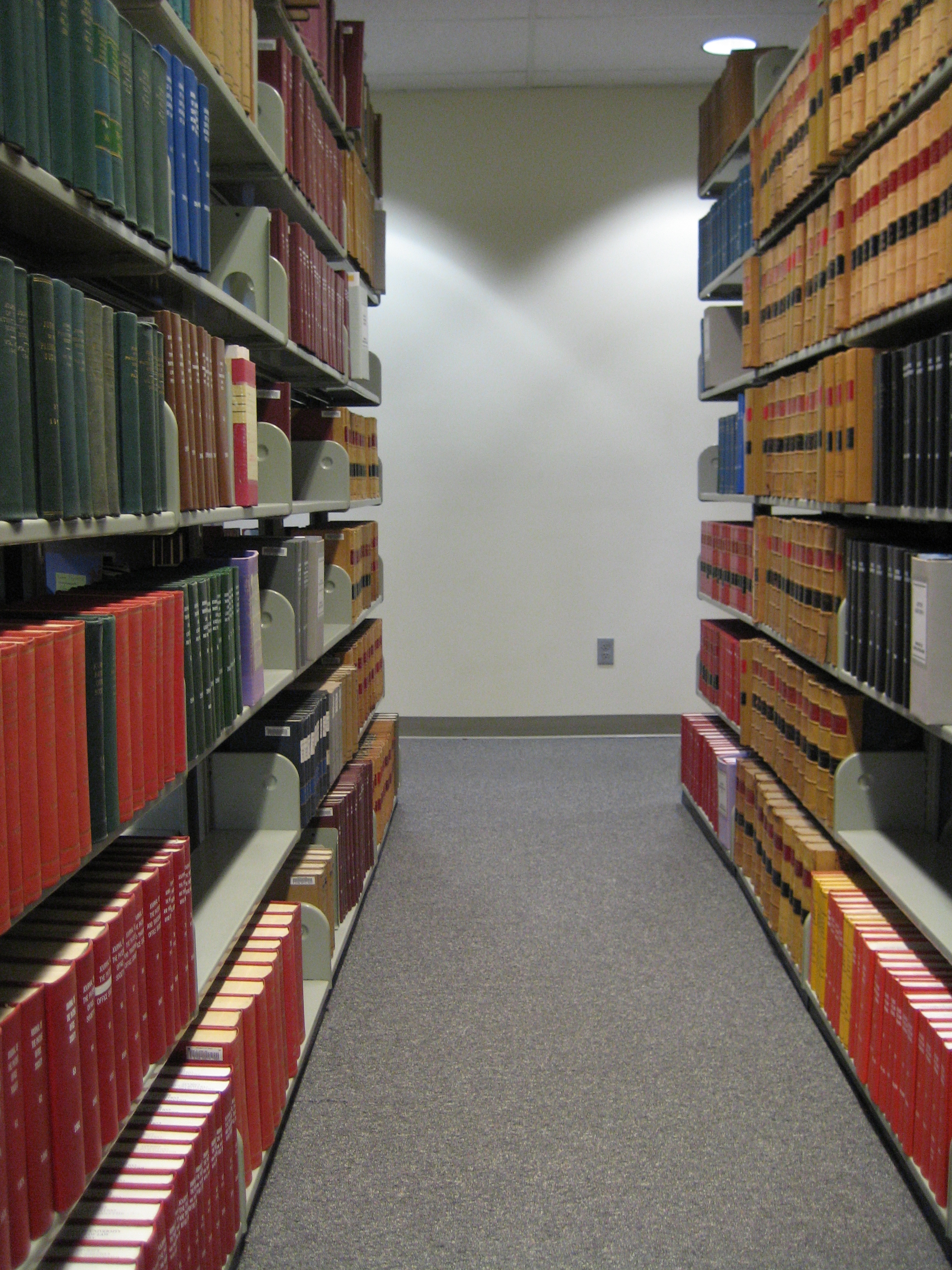
Inside the J. W. Long Law Library

=== Library ===
The J. W. Long Law Library has 296,000 volumes and microform equivalents, which include both state and federal primary law sources, as well as treatises, periodicals and other secondary legal sources. The three-story structure is attached to the Collins Legal Center and contains study rooms, video rooms, conference rooms, and computer labs, and it is staffed by reference librarians. Additionally, it has special collections in tax law, public international law, and labor law, and it is a Selective Federal Government Documents Depository. Members of the public may access the library when the library is staffed by librarians. Law students also have access to Willamette University's Mark O. Hatfield Library, the Oregon Supreme Court Law Library, the Oregon State Library, and the Oregon State Archives.

== Employment ==
A According to Willamette's 2022 ABA-required disclosures, 84.69% of the Class of 2022 obtained full-time, long-term, JD-required or JD-preferred employment nine months after graduation. Willamette's Law School Transparency under-employment score is 14.3%, indicating the percentage of the Class of 2022 unemployed, pursuing an additional degree, or working in a non-professional, short-term, or part-time job nine months after graduation.

== Costs ==
The total cost of attendance (indicating the cost of tuition, fees, health insurance, and living expenses) at Willamette for the 2023-24 academic year is $79,910. The Law School Transparency estimated debt-financed cost of attendance for three years is $246,301.

== Distinguished faculty ==
- Paul De Muniz – Former Chief Justice of the Oregon Supreme Court
- Susan M. Leeson – Former Justice of the Oregon Supreme Court
- Hans A. Linde – Former Chief Justice of the Oregon Supreme Court
- Charles L. McNary – Former United States Senator
- Edwin J. Peterson – Former Chief Justice of the Oregon Supreme Court

== Distinguished alumni ==
- Bruce Botelho – former mayor of Juneau, Alaska
- Jay Bowerman – former Governor of Oregon
- Wallace P. Carson, Jr. – former Chief Justice of the Oregon Supreme Court
- Kevin Clarkson – former Alaska Attorney General
- Willis C. Hawley – former member of the United States House of Representatives
- Fern Hobbs – former secretary to Governor Oswald West
- Jay Inslee – former Governor of the State of Washington
- Joshua Kindred – U.S. district judge, United States District Court for the District of Alaska
- Virginia Linder – former Associate Justice of the Oregon Supreme Court
- Conde McCullough – bridge engineer
- Lesil McGuire – former member of the Alaska Senate
- Bob Mionske – trial attorney, author, Olympian
- John Mizuno – Vice Speaker of the Hawaii House of Representatives
- Paul De Muniz – former Chief Justice of the Oregon Supreme Court
- Lisa Murkowski – current United States Senator
- Norma Paulus – former Oregon Secretary of State
- Leonardo Rapadas – former attorney general of Guam
- Stephen Yamashiro – Mayor of Hawaii County 1992–2000
