= Hans A. Linde =

American jurist (1924–2020)

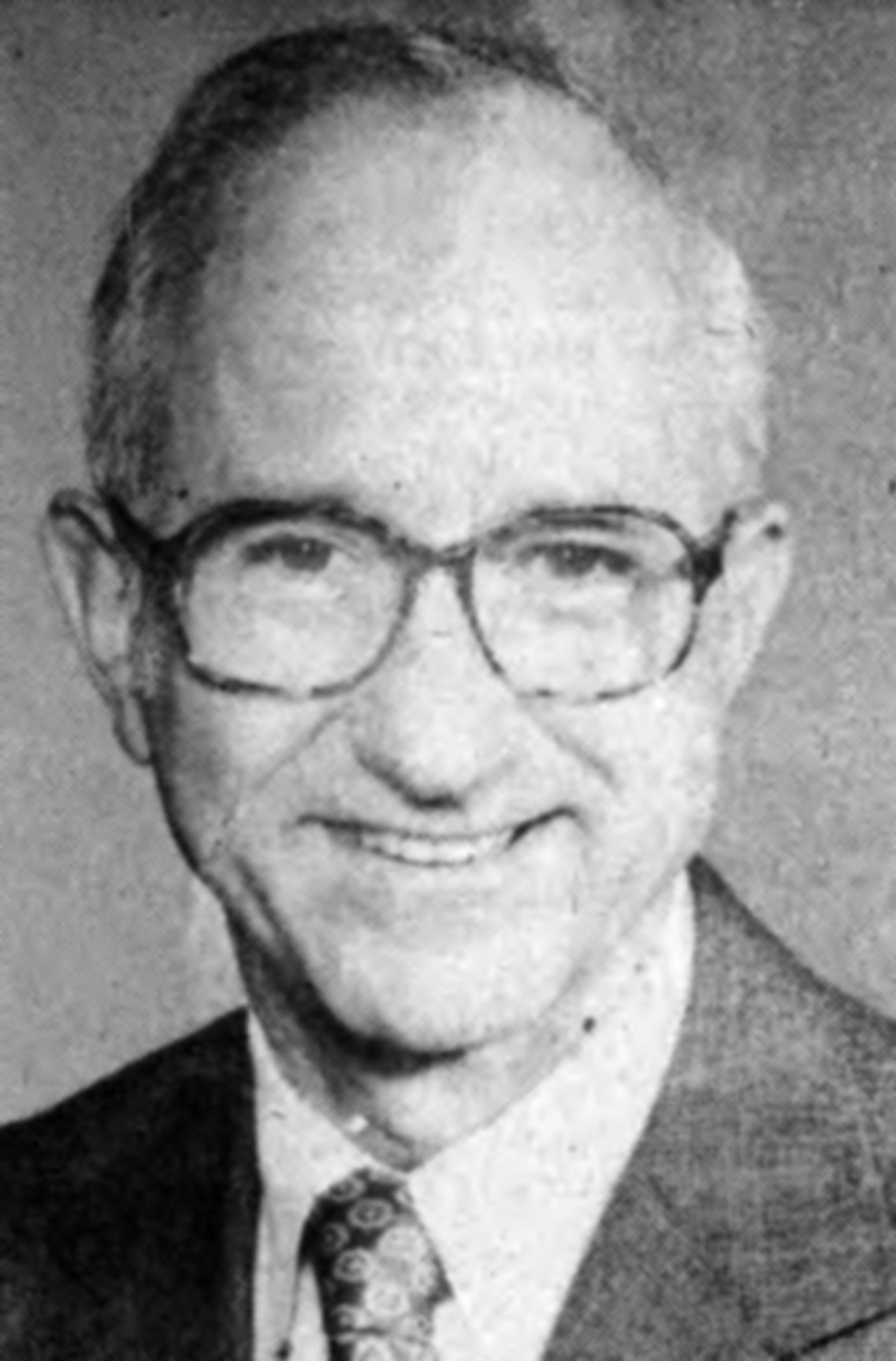

79th Justice of the Oregon Supreme Court
- In office 1977–1990
- Appointed by: Robert W. Straub
- Preceded by: William M. McAllister
- Succeeded by: Richard Unis

Personal details
- Born: April 15, 1924 Berlin, Germany
- Died: August 31, 2020 (aged 96) Portland, Oregon, U.S.
- Education: Reed College (BA); University of California, Berkeley (LLB)

Hans Arthur Linde (April 15, 1924 – August 31, 2020) was a German-born American legal scholar who served as a justice of the Oregon Supreme Court from 1977 to 1990.

Born in Berlin, Germany, Justice Linde relocated with his family to Denmark in 1933, and then immigrated to Portland, Oregon, in 1939. After serving in the United States Army during World War II, he received a B.A. from Reed College in 1947 and a J.D. at UC Berkeley School of Law in 1950. Linde served as law clerk to U.S. Supreme Court Justice William O. Douglas (1950–51), as attorney in the Office of the Legal Adviser to the United States Department of State (1951–53), and as legislative assistant to Oregon Sen. Richard L. Neuberger (1955–58). Linde was associate professor and professor of law at the University of Oregon School of Law in 1954 and 1959–76 and was a visiting professor at University of California, Berkeley, University of California, Los Angeles, Stanford University, New York University, and University of Texas at Austin, and a Fulbright lecturer in Freiburg and Hamburg, as well as at Willamette University College of Law in Salem. He served on the Oregon Supreme Court from 1977 to 1990.

In 1991, Linde served as the Wayne Morse Chair of Law and Politics, established in honor of the late former Senator, at the University of Oregon.

== Life and career ==
Linde was born on April 15, 1924, in Berlin, Germany, to Bruno Cohn Linde, attorney and arbitrator, and Luise Linde (née Rosenheim). The Linde family was Jewish. Linde married Helen Tucker on August 13, 1945. They are the parents of Lisa (1955) and David Linde (1960).

Hans Linde attended school in Berlin, Germany and Copenhagen, Denmark until his family moved to Portland, Oregon, in 1939. He attended Lincoln High School in Portland, and earned a B.A. from Reed College in 1947, after army service in World War II, and a J.D. from UC Berkeley School of Law in 1950. He was a member of Phi Beta Kappa, Order of the Coif and served as the editor-in-chief of the California Law Review (1949–1950) (see Notes, 36 Cal. L. Rev. 628 (1948) & 37 Cal. L. Rev. 129 (1949)). He was admitted to practice law in Oregon in 1950.

Linde was a clerk for Supreme Court Justice William O. Douglas (1950–51), during which time the Court handed down Dennis v. United States and Feiner v. New York. He then worked as an attorney in the Office of the Legal Adviser to the Department of State and Adviser to the United States Delegation to the United Nations General Assembly (1951–53). Afterwards he was a Legislative Assistant to U.S. Senator Richard L. Neuberger (1955–58). Linde was associate professor and professor of law at the University of Oregon in 1954 and 1959–76, and has been a visiting professor in the law schools at U.C.L.A., Stanford, New York University, University of Texas, and a Fulbright lecturer in Freiburg and Hamburg, as well as at Willamette University. His publications include a coursebook in Legislative and Administrative Processes and more than 100 articles, lectures, and reviews.

Justice Linde served on the Oregon Supreme Court from 1977 to 1990. He was appointed by Governor Robert W. Straub to a term beginning January 3, 1977, and was elected in 1978 and re-elected in 1984. He retired from the court on January 31, 1990, and taught at Arizona State University Law School post-retirement.

He was a member of Oregon's Commission on Constitutional Revision in 1961–63, and also served on the Oregon Law Commission until 2009. He was an emeritus member of the Council of the American Law Institute and a fellow of the American Academy of Arts and Sciences. A compilation of his writings from 1947 to 1992 is set out in 70 Oregon Law Review xv-xix (1991).

In 2017, Justice Linde was named Legal Citizen of the Year by the Classroom Law Project.

Linde died in Portland, Oregon, on August 31, 2020, at the age of 96. See also Ronald Collins, Jennifer Friesen & Rex Armstrong, "No better champion of the law," The Register Guard (Sept. 28, 2020) (3 former Linde law clerks)

== Selected Judicial Opinions ==
- Brown v. Multnomah County Dist. Court, 280 Or. 95, 570 P.2d 52 (1977) (fair trial)
- City of La Grande/Astoria v. Public Employees Retirement Board, 281 Or. 137, 576 P.2d 1204, aff'd on rehearing, 284 Or. 173, 586 P.2d 765 (1978) (home rule)
- City of Portland v. Tidyman, 306 Or. 174, 759 P.2d 242 (1988) (zoning & free expression)
- Anderson v. Fisher Broadcasting, 300 Or. 452, 712 .2d 803 (1986) (invasion of privacy & press freedom)
- Cooper v. Eugene School Dist., No. 4J, 301 Or. 358, 723 P.2d 298 (1986) (rts. of public employees, religious freedom)
- DeFazio v. WPPSS, 296 Or. 550, 679 P.2d 1316 (1984)
- Fazzolari v. Portland School District No. 1J, 303 Or. 1, 734 P.2d 1326 (1987) (torts: negligence)
- Hall v. May Department Store Co., 292 Or. 131, 637 P.2d 1255 (1982) (torts: intentional affliction of emotional distress)
- Humphers v. First Interstate Bank, 298 Or. 706, 696 P.2d 527 (1985) (privacy)
- Kabil Development Corporation v. Mignot, 279 Or. 151, 566 P.2d 505 (1977) (contracts)
- Koos v. Roth, 293 Or. 670, 652 P.2d 1255 (1982) (torts: strict liability)
- Lipscomb v. State, 305 Or. 472, 753 P.2d 939 (1988) (veto power & the referendum)
- Marbet v. PGE, 277 Or. 447, 561 P.2d 154 (1977)
- McCall v. Legislative Assembly, 291 Or. 663, 634 P.2d 223 (1981) (legislative reapportionment)
- Megdal v. Oregon State Board of Dental Examiners, 288 Or. 293, 605 P.2d 273 (1980) (admin. law)
- Nearing v. Weaver, 295 Or. 702, 670 P.2d 137 (1983) (torts)
- Ross v. Springfield School Dist.No. 19, 300 Or. 507, 716 P.2d 724 (1986) (rts. of public employees)
- State v. Clark, 291 Or. 231, 630 P.2d 810 (1981) (criminal justice & equality of treatment)
- State v. Freeland, 295 Or. 367, 667 P.2d 509 (1983) (grand juries & equality of treatment)
- State v. Greene, 285 Or. 337, 347, 591 P.2d 1362, 1367 (1979) (concurring) (criminal procedure)
- State v. Lowry, 295 Or. 337, 667 P.2d 996 (1983) (search & seizure)
- State v. Robertson, 293 Or. 402, 649 P.2d 569 (1982) (coercion laws & free speech))
- State v. Smith, 301 Or. 681, 702, 725 P.2d 894, 907 (1986) (dissenting) (self-incrimination)
- State v. Tourtillott, 289 Or. 845, 869, 618 P.2d 423, 435 (1980) (dissenting) (auto checkpoints)
- State of Oregon v. Wagner II, 309 Or. 5, 20, 786 P.2d 93, 101 (1990) (dissenting) (popular initiative & death penalty)
- Sterling v. Cupp, 290 Or. 611, 625 P.2d 123 (1981) (treatment of prisoners)

== Selected Scholarly Publications, etc. ==
H. Linde & G. Bunn, Legislative & Administrative Processes (Foundation, 1976) (2nd ed., 1982)

Brodie & Linde, "State Court Review of Administrative Action: Prescribing the Scope of Review," 1977 Arizona State Law Journal 537

Linde, "Constitutional Law: 1959 Oregon Survey," 39 Oregon Law Review 138 (1960)

Linde, "A Republic if You Can keep It," 16 Hastings Constitutional Law Quarterly 295 (1989)

Linde, "Replacing a President: Rx for a 21st Century Watergate," 43 George Washington Law Review 384 (1975)

Linde, "Campus Law: Berkeley Viewed From Eugene," 54 California Law Review 40 (1966)

Linde, "Are State Constitutions Common Law?," 34 Arizona Law Review 215 (1992)

Linde, "The State and the Federal Courts in Governance: Vive la Difference!," 46 William & Mary Law Review 1273 (2005)

Linde, "Who Is Responsible for Republican Government?," 65 University of Colorado Law Review 709 (1994).

Linde, "Constitutional Rights in the Public Sector: Justice Douglas on Freedom in the Welfare State," 39 Washington Law Review 4 and 40 Washington Law Review 10 (1965) (pts 1 & 2)

Linde, "Clear and Present Danger Reexamined: Dissonance in the Brandenburg Concerto," 22 Stanford Law Review 1163 (1970)

Linde, "Comment on Powell v. McCormack," 17 UCLA Law Review 174 (1969)

Linde, "The Press and Rights," New York Times, April 27, 1979

Linde, "Courts and Censorship," 66 Minnesota Law Review 171 (1981)

Linde, "Does the 'New Federalism' Have a Future?," 4 Emerging Issues in State Constitutional Law 251 (1991)

Linde, "Commentary -- Douglas as Internationalist," in "He Shall Not Pass This Way Again": The Legacy of Justice William O. Douglas, Stephen L. Wasby, editor (University of Pittsburgh Press, 1990) pp. 305–311

Linde, "Due Process of Lawmaking," 55 Nebraska Law Review 197 (1976) (Oliver Wendell Holmes Jr., Devise Lectures for 1975)

Linde, Book Review, 81 Harvard Law Review 922 (1968) (review of Diplomats, Scientists, and Politicians by Harold Jacobson and Eric Stein)

Linde, "E Pluribus -- Constitutional Theory & State Courts," 18 Georgia Law Review 165 (1984) (Sibley Lecture)

Linde, "Fair Trials & Press Freedom -- Two Rights Against the State," 13 Willamette Law Review 211 (1977)

Linde, "First Things First: Rediscovering the States' Bills of Rights," 9 University of Baltimore Law Review 379 (1980) (first annual Judge Irving A. Levine lecture) (available at ScholarWorks @ UB School of Law)

Linde, "Hercules in a Populist Age," 103 Harvard Law Review 2067 (1990) (book review)

Linde, "Judges, Critics, and the Realist Tradition," 82 Yale Law Journal 227 (1972)

Linde, "Remarks of Justice Hans A. Linde: Lane County Bar Association, Eugene, April 23, 1984," in 70 Oregon Law Review 747, at 799-802 (1991) (Appendix D) (1984 re-election campaign remarks)

Linde, "State, Sovereignty, and International Law -- A Study of Three German Legal Theories," 1947 Senior Thesis, Reed College (available at Reed College Library)

Linde, "Without 'Due Process' -- Unconstitutional Law in Oregon," 49 Oregon Law Review 125 (1970)

Linde, "When Initiative Lawmaking is not 'Republican Government': The Campaign Against Homosexuality," 72 Oregon Law Review 19 (1993)

Linde, "Alternative approaches to the international organization of disarmament" (contributor, Rand Report)

Linde, two chapters in R.J. Barnet and R.A. Falk, editors, Security in Disarmament (1965)

Linde, "Structures and Terms of Consent: Delegation, Discretion, Separation of Powers, Representation, Participation, Accountability?," 20 Cardozo Law Review 823 (1999)

Linde, "What Is a Constitution, What is Not, and Why Does it Matter?," 87 Oregon Law Review 717 (2008)

Linde, "The Inadequacy of Impeachment," in Donald L. Robinson, editor, Reforming American Government (1985), pp. 209–214

Linde & David B. Frohnmayer, "Prescription for the Citizen Legislature: Cutting the Gordian Knot," 56 Oregon Law Review 3 (1977)

David B. Frohnmayer & Hans A. Linde, "State Court Responsibility for Maintaining 'Republican Government': An Amicus Curiae Brief," 39 Willamette Law Review 1487 (2003) (brief of Linde and Frohnmayer as Amici Curiae in Support of the Petition for Certiorari, cert. denied, Sawyer v. Or. ex rel. Huddleston, 118 S. Ct. 557 (1997))

== Appellate briefs authored by Linde ==
Brief for Petitioner, Holmes v. Appling, 237 Or. 546, 392 P.2d 636 (1964)

Amicus Curiae Brief for Oregon Environmental Council, American Can Company v. Oregon Liquor Control Commission, 15 Or. App. 618, 517 P.2d 691 (1973)

Amicus Curiae Brief for Oregon Newspapers Association, Deras v. Myers, 272 Or. 47, 535 P.2d 541 (1975)

== See also ==
- List of law clerks for the fourth seat of the Supreme Court of the United States
