= Virginia Linder =

American judge (born 1953)

Justice of the Oregon Supreme Court
- In office January 2, 2007 – January 4, 2016
- Preceded by: Wallace P. Carson Jr.
- Succeeded by: Lynn Nakamoto

Judge of the Oregon Court of Appeals
- In office September 1997 – January 2007
- Appointed by: John Kitzhaber
- Preceded by: William Richardson
- Succeeded by: Timothy Sercombe

Personal details
- Born: April 20, 1953 (age 73) Cañon City, Colorado, U.S.
- Spouse: Colleen Sealock
- Education: Southern Oregon University (BA); Willamette University (JD)

Virginia Lynn Linder (born April 20, 1953) is an American judge from Oregon who served as the 99th justice of the Oregon Supreme Court from January 2007 until January 2016. She served on the Oregon Court of Appeals from 1997 until her election to the state's Supreme Court in the 2006, an electoral campaign in which she defeated former Labor Commissioner and Republican gubernatorial candidate Jack Roberts.

== Early life ==
Virginia Linder was born in Colorado, the daughter of two teachers, but grew up mostly in Carmichael, California. Linder earned her first degree in political science from Southern Oregon State College in Ashland, Oregon in 1975. She then spent two years working on the East Coast in order to save money for law school before returning to Oregon in 1977 to study law at Willamette University College of Law in Salem. She graduated from Willamette in 1980 with a Juris Doctor. While in school she worked at the Oregon Department of Justice during both her second and third years of law school, clerking in the Appellate Division of the Attorney General's Office.

== Legal career ==
She began her career as an Assistant Attorney General in the Appellate Division of the Oregon Department of Justice, starting in 1980. Then in 1984 Linder was appointed as assistant solicitor general of Oregon. In 1986, at the age of 33, she was appointed Oregon Solicitor General, being the first woman to hold that position and serving in that office for longer than anyone else in state history. During her time as Solicitor General, she represented the state of Oregon in front of the United States Supreme Court, winning Oregon v. ACF in 1994.

== Judicial career ==
In 1997, she was appointed to the Court of Appeals by Governor John Kitzhaber, and was re-elected in 1998 and 2004. Her campaign for a seat on the Oregon Supreme Court began in 2005 when Chief Justice Wallace Carson, Jr. announced that he would retire from the court in 2006. She faced Roberts and Pendleton attorney Gene Hallman in the May primary, winning 39% of the vote to Roberts' 42%. Because no candidate won a majority of the votes, Linder and Roberts advanced to the November runoff. In that runoff, Linder defeated Roberts by 52% to 48%. Linder's campaign committee raised just over $350,000 for her campaign but was outspent by more than two-to-one by the Roberts committee, which raised over $710,000. Since 1998 she has been a professor at Willamette's law school.

Linder was the first woman elected to the Oregon Supreme Court; all previous female justices had been appointed to fill vacancies. She was also the first ever openly lesbian member of a state supreme court anywhere in the nation and the first openly LGBTQ person elected as a non-incumbent to a state supreme court. When in office, she served as one of eight openly LGBT supreme court justices in the United States, alongside fellow Oregonian Rives Kistler, Colorado Supreme Court justice Monica Marquez, Hawaii Supreme Court justice Sabrina McKenna, Massachusetts Supreme Judicial Court justice Barbara Lenk, Connecticut Supreme Court justice Andrew J. McDonald, Vermont Supreme Court justice Beth Robinson, and Washington Supreme Court justice Mary Yu. Her 2006 election campaign was supported by the Gay & Lesbian Victory Fund.

== See also ==
- List of LGBT jurists in the United States
- List of LGBT state supreme court justices in the United States

Legal offices
Preceded by Wallace P. Carson Jr.	Justice of the Oregon Supreme Court; 2007–2016	Succeeded by Lynn Nakamoto
