= Willamette Law Review =

- Discipline: Law review
- Language: English
- Edited by: Angela Tam

Publication details
- Former name(s): Willamette Law Journal (1959–1978)
- History: 1959 to present
- Publisher: Willamette University College of Law (United States)
- Frequency: Triannually

Standard abbreviations
- Bluebook: Willamette L. Rev.
- ISO 4: Willamette Law Rev.

Indexing
- ISSN: 0191-9822

Links
- Journal homepage

The Willamette Law Review is a law review academic journal published by Willamette University College of Law in Salem, Oregon, United States. Founded in 1959 as a successor to an earlier publication, the triannual publication is housed in the Oregon Civic Justice Center. The journal is edited by students of the law school with oversight by the college's faculty. As of 2022, the Willamette Law Review has published a total of 58 volumes.

== History ==
Willamette University's law school established a publication called the Legal Handbooks in 1949. In 1959, the school founded their law review journal, replacing the Legal Handbooks. The school's faculty had decided to start the journal and selected the first editorial staff. Ronald B. Lansing served as the first editor in chief of what started as a twice-yearly publication. The first issue focused on employer liability.

At the beginning of its existence, the Oregon State Bar helped pay for the publication, with copies sent to all members of the Oregon Bar. The journal was first located in the law school building at what is now Gatke Hall, and moved in 1967 to the new Truman Wesley Collins Legal Center when the law school relocated to its new home. In the early years of the journal, student authors were required to meet certain academic standards. First year students and those in the lower two-thirds of their second and third year class could not submit articles for publication.

Originally titled as the Willamette Law Journal for its first 14 volumes, the name was changed to the Willamette Law Review in 1978. By Spring 1981, the yearly subscription cost for the journal had risen to US$12.50. That issue included articles on the use of televisions in courtrooms and piercing the corporate veil among other topics. In October 2006, the journal sponsored a symposium on former Oregon Supreme Court justice and distinguished scholar in residence at Willamette, Hans A. Linde.

In September 2008, Willamette Law Review moved into the new Oregon Civic Justice Center, located in the former Salem Carnegie Library, along with several other law school programs. The building was rededicated in a ceremony with Supreme Court justice Ruth Bader Ginsburg as the guest of honor.

== Editions ==
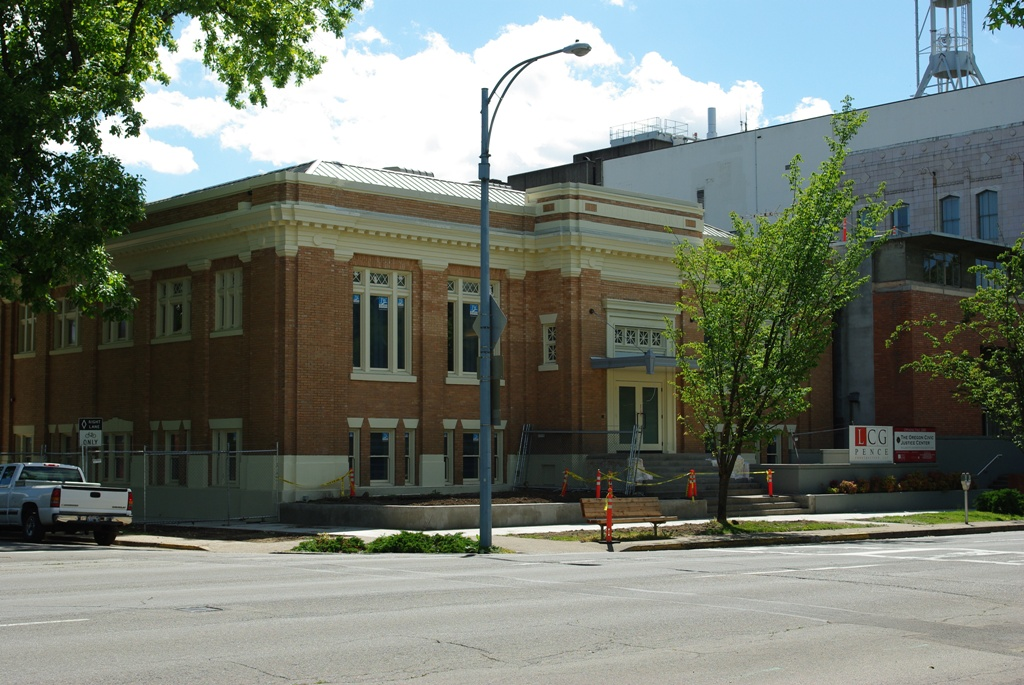
Oregon Civic Justice Center where the Willamette Law Review is housed

Early volumes of the publication focused on a single legal issue. Although the periodical is focused on legal issues in general, every other year one edition is focused on purely Oregon legal items. One of these topics was the Oregon Uniform Trust Code when it became law in 2006. According to a draft list published by the Albany Law Review, the Willamette Law Review ranks in their tier five (journals in that tier rank 196 to 260 out of 540 total law reviews) of assessment of law journals based on the journal's article selection process.

The Willamette Law Review also sponsors symposiums on various legal topics each year, and then publishes the resulting articles. Topics have included international law (2008), and sports law (2006) in recent years. The journal has been cited in a variety of publications including The Washington Quarterly, The Oregonian, and The Birmingham News to name several.
