= List of Oregon affinity bar associations =

This is a list of affinity, specialized, and local bar associations in the state of Oregon. Unlike the Oregon State Bar Association, membership in these associations is voluntary.

== Affinity bar associations ==
- Lane County Women Lawyers
- Northwest Indian Bar Association (NIBA)
- Oregon Attorneys with Disability Association (OADA)
- Oregon Asian Pacific American Bar Association (OAPABA)
- Oregon Chinese Lawyers Association (OCLA)
- Oregon Chapter of the Federal Bar Association (Oregon FBA)
- Oregon Filipino American Lawyers Association (OFALA)
- Oregon Hispanic Bar Association (OHBA)
- Oregon LGBTQ Bar Association (OGALLA)
- Oregon Minority Lawyers Association (OMLA)
- Oregon Muslim Bar Association (OMBA)
- Oregon Chapter of the National Bar Association (OC-NBA)
- Oregon Women Lawyers (OWLS)
- Portland National Lawyers Guild (Portland NLG)
- Puntland Women Lawyers Association (PUWLA)
- South Asian Bar Association - Oregon Chapter (SABA - Oregon)

== Specialty bar associations ==
- Oregon Association of Defense Counsel (OADC)
- Oregon Criminal Defense Lawyers Association (OCDLA)
- Oregon District Attorneys Association (ODAA)
- Oregon Chapter of the Federal Bar Association (Oregon FBA)
- Oregon Chapter of the American Immigration Lawyers Association (Oregon AILA)
- Oregon Trial Lawyers Association (OTLA)

== County bar associations ==
- Baker County Bar Association
- Benton-Linn County Bar Association
- Clackamas County Bar Association
- Clatsop County Bar Association
- Columbia County Bar Association
- Coos County Bar Association
- Crook-Jefferson Counties Bar Association
- Curry County Bar Association
- Deschutes County Bar Association
- Douglas County Bar Association
- Jackson County Bar Association
- Josephine County Bar Association
- Klamath County Bar Association
- Lake County Bar Association
- Lane County Bar Association
- Lincoln County Bar Association
- Linn-Benton Bar Association
- Marion County Bar Association
- Malheur County Bar Association
- Mid-Columbia County Bar Association
- Multnomah Bar Association
- Polk County Bar Association
- Tillamook County Bar Association
- Union County Bar Association
- Wallowa County Bar Association
- Wasco County Bar Association
- Washington County Bar Association
- Yamhill County Bar Association

== Judicial district bar associations ==
- Sixth Judicial District Bar Association (Umatilla and Morrow counties)
- Twenty-Fourth Judicial District Bar Association (Grant and Harney counties)
