= Edwin J. Peterson =

American judge (1930–2023)

- Peterson in 2016

39th Chief Justice of the Oregon Supreme Court
- In office 1983–1991
- Preceded by: Berkeley Lent
- Succeeded by: Wallace P. Carson, Jr.

80th Justice of the Oregon Supreme Court
- In office 1979–1993
- Appointed by: Victor Atiyeh
- Preceded by: Dean F. Bryson
- Succeeded by: Robert D. Durham

Personal details
- Born: March 30, 1930 Gilmanton, Wisconsin, U.S.
- Died: December 2, 2023 (aged 93) Salem, Oregon, U.S.
- Party: Republican
- Spouse(s): Barbara Lee (m. 1957, divorced) Anna M. Chadwick (m. 1971)
- Education: University of Oregon
- Occupation: Attorney

Edwin J. Peterson (March 30, 1930 – December 2, 2023) was an American jurist in the state of Oregon. He was the 39th Chief Justice of the Oregon Supreme Court, serving from 1983 to 1991, and was a Distinguished Jurist in Residence at Willamette University College of Law in Salem, Oregon.

== Education ==
Peterson was born on March 30, 1930, in Gilmanton, Wisconsin. In the process of moving with his family to Oregon, Peterson attended Roosevelt High School in Portland and was graduated from Eugene High School in Eugene. He received his undergraduate Bachelor of Science in music from the University of Oregon in 1951. While at school he planned to become a Congressman by the age of 35, and attended the Republican National Convention in 1952. He entered the United States Air Force the following year, attaining the rank of first lieutenant and serving until 1954. Peterson then returned to school and earned his Bachelor of Laws (LLB) degree in 1957 from Oregon's law school. He enjoyed the law, and dropped his ambitions for Congress.

== Legal career ==
Peterson practiced law in Portland, Oregon, for over 20 years with the firm Tooze, Kerr, Peterson, Marshall & Shenker. Following private practice, he joined the Oregon Supreme Court on May 15, 1979 after being appointed by Governor Vic Atiyeh. He then was re-elected in 1980, 1986, and 1992. In 1983 he was elected as Chief Justice of the court by his fellow justices, serving until 1991. Peterson was president of the Multnomah Bar Association from 1972 to 1973.

In 1989, Peterson was awarded the University of Oregon Law's Meritorious Service Award, and the following year was the recipient of the Oregon State Bar Association's Award of Merit. While on the court he focused on improving the efficiency of the courts and to integrate all the courts of the Oregon Judicial Department. As part of these efforts, the time to trial in Oregon dropped almost in half to about one year, and he helped create the rules for trial courts. He was awarded the American Judicature Society's Herbert Harley Award in September 1992 for his efforts to improve administration of the courts in Oregon. While on the court he led efforts to study and eliminate racial and ethnic biases in the courts. This included serving as the chairman of a task force on bias in the Oregon courts. Peterson resigned from the court effective December 31, 1993.

== Later years ==
After leaving the court he was given the University of Oregon's Distinguished Service Award, and the Oregon State Bar Association's President's Award for Affirmative Action in 1995. The University of Oregon's alumni association gave Peterson their Distinguished Alumni Award in 1996, and in 1998 he earned the National Inns of Court’s Lewis F. Powell Jr. Award for Professionalism and Ethics. Peterson has, in the past, been a member of the Salem Pops Orchestra, where he played the French horn.

Peterson died in Salem on December 2, 2023, at the age of 93.
