= Cedric Hayden =

Cedric Hayden may refer to:

- Cedric Lee Hayden (born 1934), Oregon state representative from 1985 to 1993
- Cedric Ross Hayden, Oregon state representative from 2015 to present
