= Chuck Bennett (disambiguation) =

Chuck Bennett may refer to:

- Chuck Bennett (1907–1973), American football player and coach
- Chuck Bennett (politician) (born 1948), American politician
- Chuck Bennett (singer), American singer
