= Anna Peterson =

Anna Peterson may refer to:

- Anna M. Peterson (born 1947), American politician
- Anna L. Peterson (born 1963), American scholar of religious studies
- Anna Peterson (cricketer) (born 1990), New Zealand cricketer

== See also ==
- Anna Petersen (1845–1910), Danish painter
- Ann-Sofi Pettersson (born 1932), Swedish gymnast
