= Women Lawyers Association =

Women Lawyers Association can refer to:

- Ethiopian Women Lawyers Association
- German Women Lawyers Association
- Pakistan Women Lawyers' Association
- Puntland Women Lawyers Association
- Women Lawyers Association (Malawi)

== See also ==
- Bangladesh National Women Lawyers' Association
- California Women Lawyers
- National Association of Women Lawyers in USA
