= Senator Bryson =

Senator Bryson may refer to:

- Dean F. Bryson (1910–1995), Oregon State Senate
- Jim Bryson (politician) (born 1961), Tennessee State Senate
