= Chris Hoy (politician) =

American politician

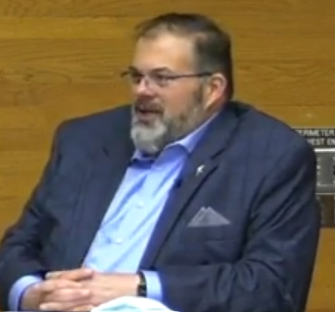
- Hoy in 2021

Mayor of Salem
- In office November 2, 2022 – January 13, 2025
- Preceded by: Chuck Bennett
- Succeeded by: Julie Hoy

Member of the Oregon House of Representatives from the 21st district
- In office December 8, 2021 – January 9, 2023
- Preceded by: Brian Clem
- Succeeded by: Kevin Mannix

Personal details
- Born: 1965 or 1966 (age 60–61)
- Party: Democratic
- Education: Willamette University (BA)

Chris Hoy (born 1965/1966) is an American politician and retired law enforcement officer who was the mayor of Salem, Oregon from 2022 to 2025, when he was succeeded by Julie Hoy (no relation). He also formerly served as a member of the Oregon House of Representatives from the 21st district. He was appointed to the House on December 8, 2021. In 2022, he won the election for mayor of Salem, and was set to take office in 2023. However, following the resignation of Chuck Bennett, the former mayor of Salem, Hoy took office on November 2, 2022, instead.

== Background ==
Hoy earned a Bachelor of Arts degree in political science and English from Willamette University. He served as an officer in the Clackamas County Sheriff's Office for 30 years. He was elected to the Salem, Oregon City Council in 2017.

Political offices
Preceded by Chuck Bennett	Mayor of Salem; 2022–2025	Succeeded by Julie Hoy
