= Dean F. Bryson =

American judge

Dean Frederick Bryson

77th Justice of the Oregon Supreme Court
- In office 1970–1979
- Appointed by: Tom McCall
- Preceded by: Gordon Sloan
- Succeeded by: Edwin J. Peterson

Member of the Oregon Senate
- In office 1953–1955

Member of the Oregon House of Representatives
- In office 1943–1945

Personal details
- Born: September 27, 1910 Portland, Oregon
- Died: April 15, 1995 (aged 84) Fresno, California
- Party: Republican
- Spouse: Marjorie Bryson

Dean Frederick Bryson (September 27, 1910 – April 15, 1995) was an American attorney in the state of Oregon, United States. He was the 77th justice of the Oregon Supreme Court. Previously he was a circuit court judge for Multnomah County, Oregon, a legislator in the Oregon House of Representatives, served in the Oregon Senate, and was president of the state bar association.

== Early life ==
Bryson was born in Portland, Oregon. He earned his law degree in 1934 from Northwestern College of Law in Portland and was admitted to the bar the same year.

He was later a member of the State Marine Board and National Labor Relations Board. In 1959, Bryson began serving on the Oregon State Bar Association’s Board of Governors, continuing through 1961. That year, he was also the organization’s president.

== Politics ==
Bryson was elected to the Oregon House of Representatives as a Republican and served from 1943 to 1945. From 1953 to 1955 he served in the Oregon State Senate. In 1961, Governor Mark Hatfield appointed him to the Multnomah County Circuit Court. There he served for nine years and was elected as the presiding judge of the court in 1968. As a judge on that court, he made news for issuing a restraining order to protect a Navy recruiter working at Portland State University from 36 students in 1970 during the Vietnam War.

On October 23, 1970, Bryson was appointed to the Oregon Supreme Court by Oregon Governor Tom McCall to replace Gordon Sloan who had resigned. Earlier in the year, Bryson defeated Sloan in his re-election bid. Bryson won re-election to a second six-year term in 1976; however, he resigned before the end of that term on April 1, 1979.

== Later life and family ==
Bryson was married to Marjorie Bryson for 56 years. The couple had three daughters named Joy, Gayl and Lynne.
