= Randall B. Kester =

American judge

- Kester in 2006

69th Justice of the Oregon Supreme Court
- In office 1957–1958
- Appointed by: Elmo Smith
- Preceded by: Walter L. Tooze
- Succeeded by: Gordon Sloan

Personal details
- Born: October 20, 1916 Ontario, Oregon, US
- Died: May 31, 2012 (aged 95) Portland, Oregon, US
- Spouse(s): Rachael W. Kester (?-2012; his death)
- Education: Willamette University, Columbia Law School

Randall Blair Kester (October 20, 1916 – May 31, 2012) was an American attorney and judge in the state of Oregon. He was the 69th justice of the Oregon Supreme Court, serving from 1957 to 1958. He later taught at what became the Lewis & Clark Law School and was in private practice in Portland, Oregon, decades after leaving the bench.

== Early life ==
Kester was born on October 20, 1916, in Vale, Oregon, and grew up in Ontario, Oregon. As a child he worked at the county library in Ontario, Oregon where he earned 50¢ per week to haul books to and from the post office that had been delivered by the Oregon State Library. During high school he worked for the local newspaper, the Ontario Argus.

Later while in college at Willamette University in Salem, Oregon he worked for the state library when it was located at the Oregon Supreme Court Building. In 1935, the Oregon State Capitol burned down and many of the books of the state library were damaged by water as they were stored in the basement of the Supreme Court Building which was connected by tunnels to the Capitol Building. Kester's job was to try and dry out and salvage as many books as he could. In 1937 as president of the senior class he helped break ground on a new library for Willamette. After graduating in 1937 Kester then attended law school in New York City at Columbia Law School, graduating in 1940.

== Legal career ==
After graduation from Columbia, Kester moved to Portland, Oregon and joined the law firm of Maguire, Shields and Morrison where the primary client was the Union Pacific Railroad. During World War II he volunteered with the Mount Hood Ski Patrol and is credited with keeping that organization going during the war when many of the regular patrollers were off fighting in the war.

Kester was president of the Multnomah Bar Association from 1956 to early 1957.

On January 3, 1957, he was appointed by Oregon Governor Elmo Smith to the Oregon Supreme Court to replace Walter L. Tooze who had died in office. Kester served on the court until March 1, 1958, when he resigned from the bench. He resigned in order to become the general solicitor for Union Pacific's legal department in the Pacific Northwest.

While working for UP in 1972 he filed briefs in support of the lower court's decision in the Supreme Court of the United States case Port of Portland v. United States in a decision regarding interstate commerce. Then in 1980 Kester retired from Union Pacific and went back to his old firm. From 1986 to 1987 he was president of the City Club of Portland.

== Later years and death ==
As of January 2006 at the age of 89 he was believed to be the oldest lawyer in Oregon still practicing law. At that time he was a senior partner for Cosgrave Vergeer Kester in Portland. Randall Kester died on May 31, 2012, at the age of 95 from natural causes in his home of Portland, Oregon.

== Works authored ==
- "The War Industries Board, 1917–1918; A Study in Industrial Mobilization". The American Political Science Review, Vol. 34, No. 4. (Aug. 1940).
- The First duty: a history of the U.S. District Court for Oregon. Portland, Or: U.S. District Court of Oregon Historical Society, (1993), contributor.
