= Walter L. Tooze =

American judge (1887–1956)

Walter L. Tooze Jr.
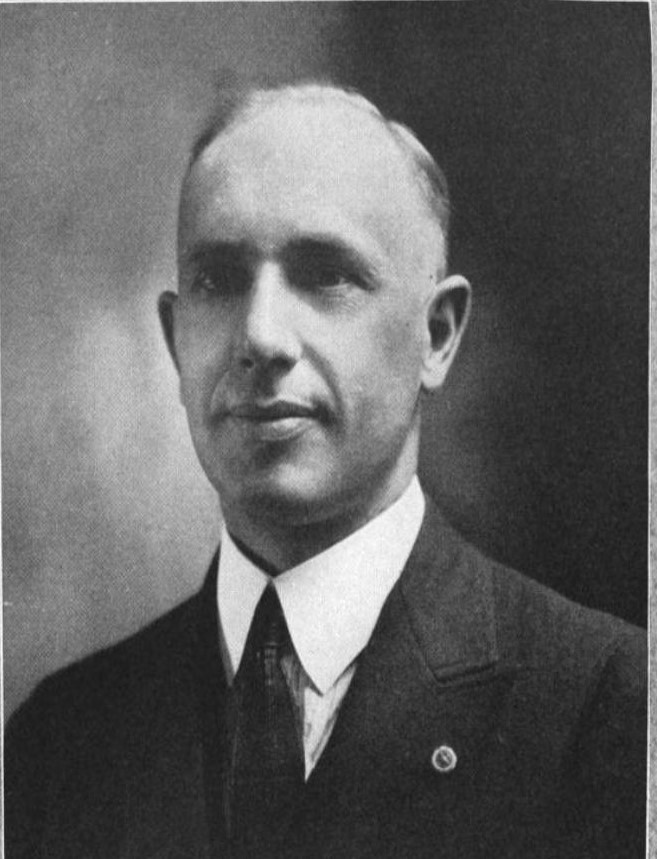

66th Justice of the Oregon Supreme Court
- In office 1950–1956
- Appointed by: Douglas McKay
- Preceded by: John O. Bailey
- Succeeded by: Randall B. Kester

Personal details
- Born: February 24, 1887 Butteville, Oregon, US
- Died: December 21, 1956 (aged 69)
- Spouse(s): Ruth Belden Smith; Caroline V. Glaizer; Helen Jane Laurell
- Education: University of Michigan
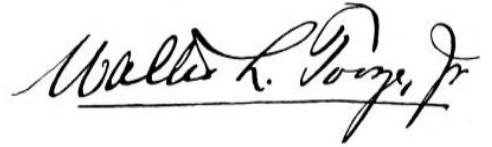
- Signature

Walter Lincoln Tooze, Jr. (February 24, 1887 – December 21, 1956) was an American attorney and politician in Oregon. He served as the 66th justice of the Oregon Supreme Court and as a state district court judge. Born in Oregon, he was veteran of World War I and unsuccessful candidate for the United States Congress.

== Early life ==
Tooze was born February 24, 1887, in Butteville, Oregon, on French Prairie in the Willamette Valley. The son of Walter and Sadie Barnes Tooze, he attended a variety of schools including one in Woodburn, Oregon, along with Bishop Scott Academy and Mt. Angel Academy. Tooze then went to the University of Michigan where he graduated in 1908 with a degree in law.

== Legal career ==
Tooze then returned to Oregon and began a law practice in Dallas in 1908. He remained there until 1917, before practicing in McMinnville with William T. Vinton from 1919 to 1929. Official journals of the Oregon Senate and House indicate that, beginning in 1917, Walter L. Tooze, Sr., served as the reading clerk in the Oregon State Senate, and remained in that position until 1923. This was the father of Walter L. Tooze, Jr., the subject of this article, who later became a judge. During World War I Tooze was a captain in the U.S. Army's 91st Division.

In 1929 he moved his practice to Portland where he was then appointed as a temporary judge in 1941 for Oregon's Fourth Judicial District. The following year he won election to that same position. Previously, in 1938 he was a candidate in the Republican primary for Oregon's third congressional district, and in 1940 was a delegate to the Republican National Convention.

Then on November 16, 1950, Walter Tooze was appointed by Oregon Governor Douglas McKay to replace justice John O. Bailey on the Oregon Supreme Court after Bailey resigned his post. Tooze then won a full six-year term that same year and won re-election in 1956. He then died in office on December 21, 1956, shortly after winning re-election.

=== Opinions authored ===
- Landgraver vs. Emanuel Lutheran Charity Board, 203 Or. 489, 280 P.2d 301 (1955) (tort liability immunity for charities)

== Family ==
Tooze was married three times. He had three children with his first wife Ruth Belden Smith and three children with his second wife Caroline V. Glazier. He married his third wife Helen Jane Laurell in 1944.
