= Gordon Sloan =

American judge

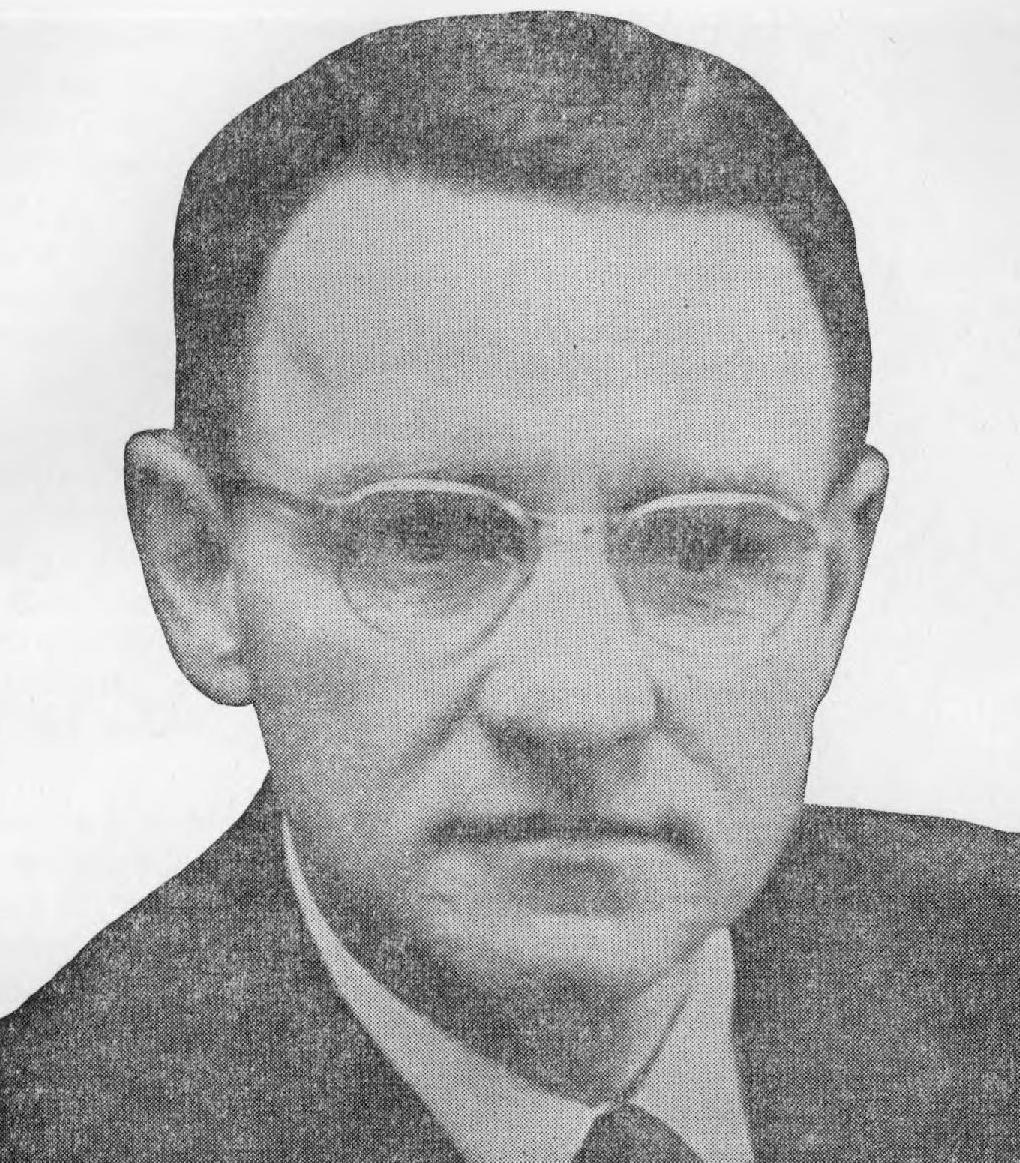

70th Justice of the Oregon Supreme Court
- In office 1958–1970
- Appointed by: Robert D. Holmes
- Preceded by: Randall B. Kester
- Succeeded by: Dean F. Bryson

Personal details
- Born: April 9, 1911 Hoxie, Kansas, U.S.
- Died: August 23, 2006 (aged 95) Wilsonville, Oregon, U.S.
- Spouse: Geneve Tipton

Gordon Wright Sloan (April 9, 1911 – August 23, 2006) was an American attorney and judge. He was the 70th justice of the Oregon Supreme Court in the United States. He previously served on the International Tuna Commission, and later the Kansas native was Oregon’s first senior judge.

== Early life ==
Gordon Sloan was born to Edward R. Sloan and Julie Wright Sloan in Hoxie, Kansas, on April 9, 1911. His father was a judge for the Kansas Supreme Court who graduated from Washburn University School of Law five years before Gordon’s birth. Soon after Gordon’s birth, the family relocated to Holton, Kansas, where Gordon attended the local public schools. After graduating from high school in Holton in 1929 he went on to the University of Kansas where he graduated in 1933 as president of his senior class. Gordon then went on to law school at Washburn where his brother Eldon graduated in 1933. Gordon graduated in 1935.

== Legal career ==
After law school Gordon Sloan began working as an assistant district attorney in the city of Topeka, Kansas, until 1938. That year he married Geneve Tipton and they moved to Oregon, settling in Astoria along the Oregon Coast. On March 1, 1958, Sloan was appointed to the Oregon Supreme Court to replace Randall B. Kester by Oregon Governor Robert D. Holmes after Kester resigned from the court. Gordon then won election to a full six-year term later in 1958. In 1964 he won re-election after running unopposed. Sloan resigned from the court on October 1, 1970. Earlier in the year Dean F. Bryson defeated Sloan in his re-election bid.

After retiring from the bench, Gordon Sloan was appointed as the first senior judge in the state of Oregon’s history. He was also appointed to the International Tuna Commission by United States President Harry Truman.

== Family ==
Gordon and his wife Geneve had two children together, Bill and Sally. In addition to his brother, Gordon had a sister named Clarice. Gordon Sloan died on August 23, 2006, at the age of 95 in Wilsonville, Oregon.
