= Anna M. Peterson =

American politician (born 1947)

Mayor of Salem
- In office January 11, 2011 – December 31, 2016
- Preceded by: Janet Taylor
- Succeeded by: Chuck Bennett

Personal details
- Born: Anna M. Chadwick; May 30, 1947 (age 79) Corvallis, Oregon, U.S.
- Party: Republican
- Spouse: Edwin J. Peterson
- Children: 3
- Education: University of Oregon
- Website: Mayor's Website

Anna M. Peterson (née Chadwick; born May 30, 1947) is an American politician who served as Mayor of Salem, the state capital of Oregon, from 2011 until 2016. She was married to Edwin J. Peterson, who was Chief Justice of the Oregon Supreme Court from 1983 until 1991. A Republican, and the third woman to hold the non-partisan office, Peterson became mayor on January 11, 2011, when she succeeded Janet Taylor.

== Early life and education ==
Anna M. Peterson was born on May 30, 1947, to Harry and Eve Chadwick. Harry met Eve in England during World War II. Peterson, the second of two children, was born in Corvallis, Oregon, where her parents had moved after her father returned from serving in the war, so that he could attend college. The family moved to Portland, Oregon, where her father became a firefighter for Portland Fire and Rescue. Her parents divorced when she was 5, and her mother remarried to a man who worked in a lumber mill. Despite her mother working several jobs, the family faced extreme poverty. She graduated from Roosevelt High School and married soon after. The marriage, which produced one child, ended in divorce. In 1971, Peterson married attorney Edwin J. Peterson, who had two children from a previous marriage. Peterson started college at Portland State University at age 28, while also working as a homemaker. It was at this time that Peterson became involved in Multnomah County politics as a young Republican. The Petersons moved to Salem after Edwin was appointed to the Oregon Supreme Court in 1979. Peterson commuted from Salem to the University of Oregon (UO) in Eugene and received her Bachelor of Science degree in journalism from the UO in 1984.

== Career ==
=== Early career ===
From 1984 to 1987, Peterson was the director of development and alumni relations for the University of Oregon School of Law in Eugene. From 1987 to 1990, she was the development and marketing director of the Garten Foundation (today Garten Services, Inc.), which aids people with developmental disabilities and long-term mental illness. From 1990 to 1992, she owned a marketing and public relations firm, Successful Results with Anna Peterson. She managed the printing division of the Oregon agriculture weekly Capital Press from 1992 to 1997. In 2002, Peterson served as campaign manager for Janet Taylor's successful bid for mayor of Salem. Peterson and Taylor became friends while they served on the SEDCOR board of directors. Taylor asked for Peterson's help with her mayoral campaign after she learned that Peterson had run all four of her husband's successful statewide campaigns for election to the Oregon Supreme Court.

Peterson served on the board of directors of SEDCOR (the Strategic Economic Development Corporation), and held a position as the first female director for Commercial Bank (now West Coast Bank). She co-founded and was for three years the chair of No Meth–Not in My Neighborhood, served for four years on the Oregon Criminal Justice Commission, and chaired the Governor's Meth Task Force. She was also on Salem's Community Policing Advisory Committee, the Oregon Medical Association Amphetamine Task Force, and the Marion County Guido Caldarazzo Meth Task Force. More recently, she has served on the Marion County Public Safety Coordinating Council and the Mid-Willamette Valley Council of Governments Executive Council. Peterson has led arts and civic organizations, including the Salem Rotary Club, the Oregon Symphony Association in Salem, the Elsinore Theatre, the Salem Public Library Foundation, and is a founding director of the Oregon Artists Series Foundation to bring art to public spaces in Salem. Anna Peterson has twice received Salem's highest volunteer recognition, the Willard C. Marshall Award, and was named Salem Area Chamber of Commerce First Citizen in 2003.

=== Mayor of Salem ===
Peterson announced her candidacy for mayor of Salem, Oregon in October 2009. She was elected mayor of Salem in 2010 after defeating city councilor Chuck Bennett, and was reelected in 2012 and 2014. She ran unopposed in both reelections. Before her first term as mayor, she had never held elected office. Peterson's first run for mayor was endorsed by the Salem Business Journal and the Statesman Journal.

She was succeeded by Chuck Bennett at the beginning of 2017.

=== Political influences ===
Peterson has stated that her political influences include former Governor Tom McCall, Attorneys General Dave Frohnmayer and Hardy Myers, and judge Betty Roberts.

=== Other appointments ===
As of 2015, Peterson was serving on the Oregon State Fair Council, which was established by Governor John Kitzhaber in 2014 to transition the Oregon State Fair and Exposition Center from a state agency to a public corporation.
