= Multnomah Bar Association =

- Abbreviation: MBA
- Formation: February 28, 1906; 120 years ago
- Founded at: Portland, Oregon
- Type: Nonprofit 501(c)(6) mutual benefit with members
- Registration no.: Oregon 094412-13
- Purpose: Improvement of legal profession and justice system
- Location: Portland, Oregon, US
- Region served: Multnomah County, Oregon
- Members: about 4,600 (2022)
- Main organ: Multnomah Lawyer
- Affiliations: Multnomah Bar Foundation
- Revenue: $793,869 (2020)
- Expenses: $812,942
- Staff: Four (4) (2022)
- Award: American Bar Association Award of Merit (1960)
- Website: https://mbabar.org/

The Multnomah Bar Association (MBA) is a voluntary bar association located in Portland, Oregon. The organization is also sometimes referred to as the Multnomah County Bar Association. Although named after Multnomah County membership in the association is open to all lawyers in the State of Oregon. The present MBA was founded in 1906. There was an earlier group of attorneys, also called the Multnomah Bar Association, which appears to have dissolved some time in the early 1900s.

The Multnomah Bar Association now provides numerous services for both attorneys and members of the community involved in the justice system or needing legal assistance. Most of the association's work is done pro bono by volunteer attorneys.

== Services to justice system ==
Most of the work of the association is done through volunteers on its committees.

The CLE committee plans, conducts, and evaluates numerous continuing legal education events for lawyers, by developing topics and recruiting speakers. The Court Liaison Committee works with the judiciary and court administrator regarding rules or procedural changes and assists the court in educating MBA members about court issues. The committee surveys MBA members court issues, and writes articles for publication in the association's newsletter about court topics and backgrounds of local judges and referees.

The Equity, Diversity & Inclusion Committee works toward diversity, inclusion and equality in the MBA and Multnomah County legal community and for mutual support between the MBA and diverse bar organizations. The committee administers the LSAT scholarship program and MBA Diversity Award Nomination & Selection Process. The Judicial Screening Committee confidentially reviews applications of pro tem and judicial appointment candidates and reports its recommendations as called for in the MBA's board-approved process. The committee's goal is to assist the governor in appointing highly qualified lawyers to be judges on the Multnomah County Circuit Court.

MBA makes available pro bono projects through which volunteer lawyers can provide services to the community. These include the Senior Law Project (SLP), which includes monthly legal clinics in senior centers in Multnomah County. Volunteer lawyers also provide free 30-minute phone consultations on any civil legal issue to seniors 60 or older. MBA also has programs for volunteer lawyers to assist seniors with guardianship, protection orders, and similar civil matters.

MBA also maintains pro bono programs for other areas of legal assistance, including consumer, family, immigration, and juvenile law, and protection from abuse.

== Multnomah Bar Foundation ==
The association is linked to the Multnomah Bar Foundation (MBF), which provides support services to persons involved in the justice system. MBF was founded in 2005 and is a 501(c)(3) nonprofit organization. MBF funds three programs: CourtConnect, CourtSupport, and Multnomah CourtCare.

Multnomah CourtCare makes available free, drop-in childcare for families with business at the Multnomah County Central Courthouse. CourtSupport provides the Multnomah Central Courthouse with a bilingual employee at the information desk to serve to the public by answering questions about the court, helping people with needed services or accommodations at the courthouse, and generally making improving the public's courthouse experience. CourtConnect arranges for lawyers and judges to visit community groups and present information about the court system and the rule of law.

== History ==
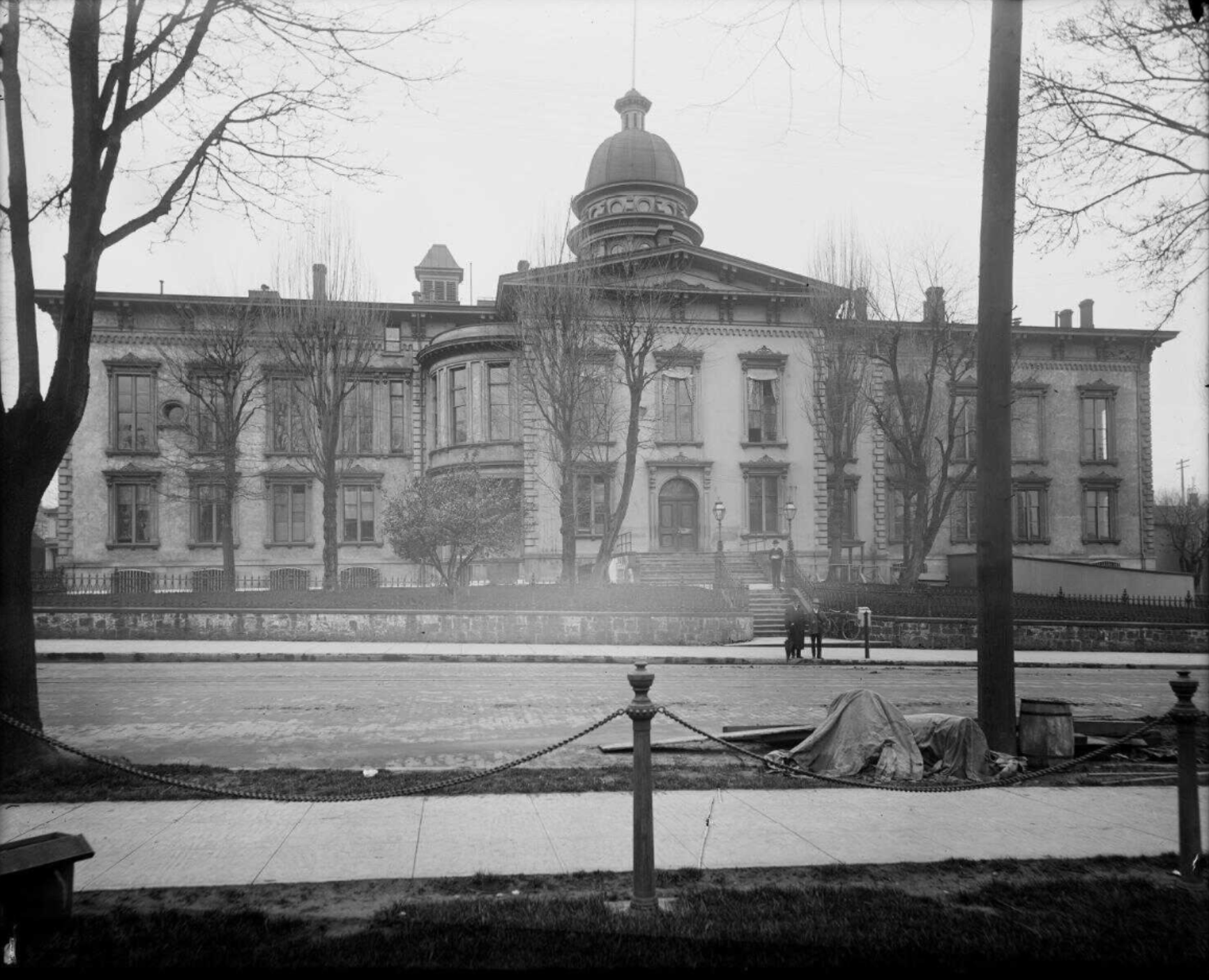
Multnomah County Courthouse circa 1900, looking northwest across Fourth Avenue

Although formally organized in 1906, there are multiple earlier references to an association by the same name. The earlier association may have been established around 1899, or earlier. The Multnomah Bar Association is mentioned in 1891 in an obituary for pioneer Oregon lawyer Ferdinand O. McCown. In 1892, the first Multnomah Bar Association raised $500 to pay to have a portrait painted of Circuit Court Judge Eramus D. Shattuck, who served on the court from 1886 to 1898. He had also been Chief Justice of the Oregon Supreme Court from 1866 to 1867.

The first association was reported to have become involved in politics and consequently dissolved before 1906. The first association may have had some attorney disciplinary role in 1904, as a judge is reported to have rebuked an attorney for a disrespectful brief, and stated that he had considered referring the matter to the Multnomah County Bar Association.

=== Formation of the current association ===
Attorneys met at the Abington building in Portland on Saturday evening, February 3, 1906, to plan the creation of the Multnomah Bar Association. Even though most local lawyers belonged to the state bar association, Multnomah County was then the only county in Oregon that did not have a local bar association, and it was felt that one needed to be re-established. Two rules of the new organization were to be that it would endorse no political candidates and members of every political party would be entitled to admission.

On the evening of February 10, 1906, about 150 lawyers met in Portland at the Chamber of Commerce building and "took definite steps towards the organization of the Multnomah County Bar Association", by appointing temporary officers and scheduling a formal meeting to elect permanent officers. The purposes of the association were to promote the ethics of the profession and to foster higher standards among its members. The association had monthly meetings at the county courthouse and held an annual banquet.

The first officers chosen were: S.C. Spencer, president; Ralph B. Fisher, secretary; Waldemar M. Seton, treasurer, and L.E. Crouch, A.T. Lewis, and J.H. Woodward, vice-presidents. Three chancellors, Circuit Court Judge Robert G. Morrow, J.H. Woodward, and George F. Brice, were appointed to act as a trial court to hear charges against attorneys. Ralph R. Duniway was elected prosecutor. Fifty local lawyers signed the charter roll, and many others joined in the following week.

=== Early qualifications for admission ===
At the bar association's meeting on the evening of May 26, 1906, there was an "animated discussion" about the new association's plans for a grievance committee and whether it should refer complaints to the state bar association for action through its own grievance committee. The vote was that "all reputable persons of good moral character who have been admitted to the bar by the Supreme Court [of Oregon] are eligible for membership." "Riff-raff lawyers and pettifoggers are to be excluded."

=== Membership changes ===
As of February, 1907, 169 lawyers were members of the association. As of May 1909, Ella Crim Lynch was the only woman member of the Multnomah Bar Association. By February 1912, there were 302 members of the association. By February 1920, there were 450 lawyers who were members of the association, constituting the majority of the lawyers practicing in Multnomah County.

=== Panic of 1907 ===
Following the October financial crisis known as the Panic of 1907, the bar association voted to suspend attachment proceedings for 90 days except in emergencies.

=== Retaliatory murder of bar prosecutor ===
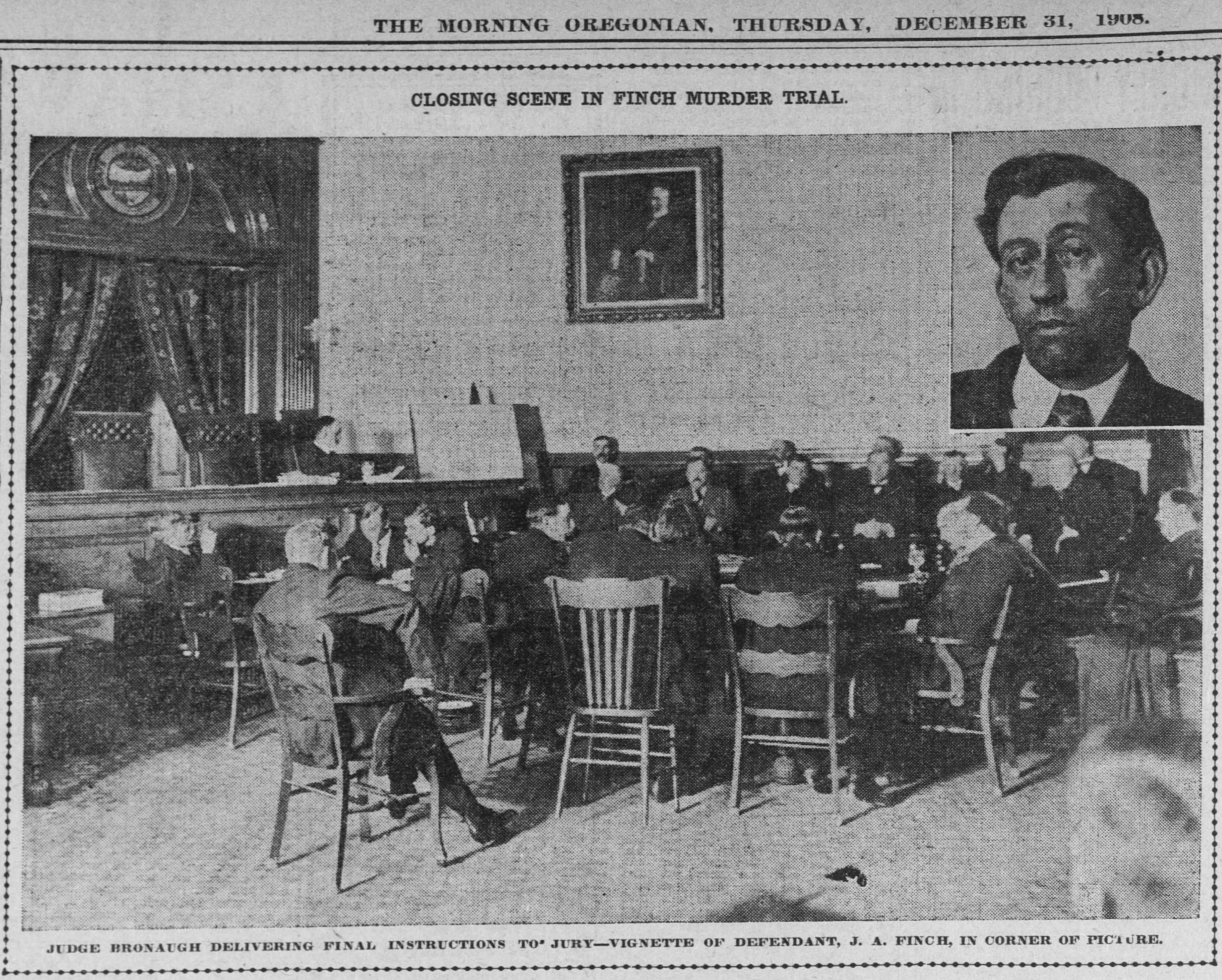
Finch murder trial. Judge Earl C. Bronaugh, Jr. is giving final instructions to the jury.

The case against Finch came before the Justice court on December 2, 1908, for a preliminary hearing. Finch was represented by attorneys C.F. Lord and C.H. Piggott. The state of Oregon was represented by District Attorney George J. Cameron and his chief deputy John J. Fitzgerald.

On Saturday, December 12, 1908, the circuit court ordered Finch to be prepared to go to trial the next Friday, December 18. Finch asked for one more week to decide how he would plead, but this request was denied by circuit court presiding judge Calvin U. Gantenbein. When Finch declined to enter a plea, judge Calvin U. Gantenbein entered a plea of "not guilty" for him, and scheduled the trial to begin the next Friday. The speed of Finch's trial, less than a month after the murder, was said to have set a new record in speedy trials.

On the afternoon of Wednesday, December 30, 1908, Finch was found guilty of first degree murder by the jury after deliberations that lasted only 30 minutes. The jury was composed entirely of men. The trial judge was Earl C. Bronaugh, Jr.

=== Portland vice scandal ===
In 1914, prominent lawyer and MBA member Edward Stonewall Jackson McAllister was convicted of sodomy in what became known as the Portland vice scandal. According to the charge, this occurred in McAllister's law office. McAllister's conviction was reversed on appeal on the grounds of the trial judge giving improper instructions to the jury. Despite this, McAllister's law practice was ruined, and on January 27, 1914, the Multnomah Bar Association terminated his membership with no dissenting vote. In June 2000, MBA reviewed McAllister's case and voted to posthumously restore him to its membership.

=== Steamboat excursion ===
The bar association sponsored social events for its members. In August 1915, the bar association chartered the stern-wheel steamboat Joseph Kellogg for an excursion to run from Portland to the Waverly Country Club.

=== Involvement in Espionage Act case ===
In 1922, the Multnomah County Bar Association became involved in the case of a lawyer, Joseph Woerndle, who had been prosecuted under the Espionage Act and against whom, unsuccessfully, the government had filed de-naturalization proceedings.

Judge Bean found for Woerndle in the denaturalization proceedings, and his ruling was upheld by the U.S. Ninth Circuit Court of Appeals. The Multnomah Bar Association also initiated disbarment proceedings in the Oregon Supreme Court against lawyer Joseph Woerndle. The complaint against Woerndle alleged he had committed perjury, in that he had made a false affidavit in securing a passport for himself, which he was said to have given to one Hans W. Boehn, an alleged German spy, to assist Boehn in returning to Germany from the United States.

== Involvement in legislation ==
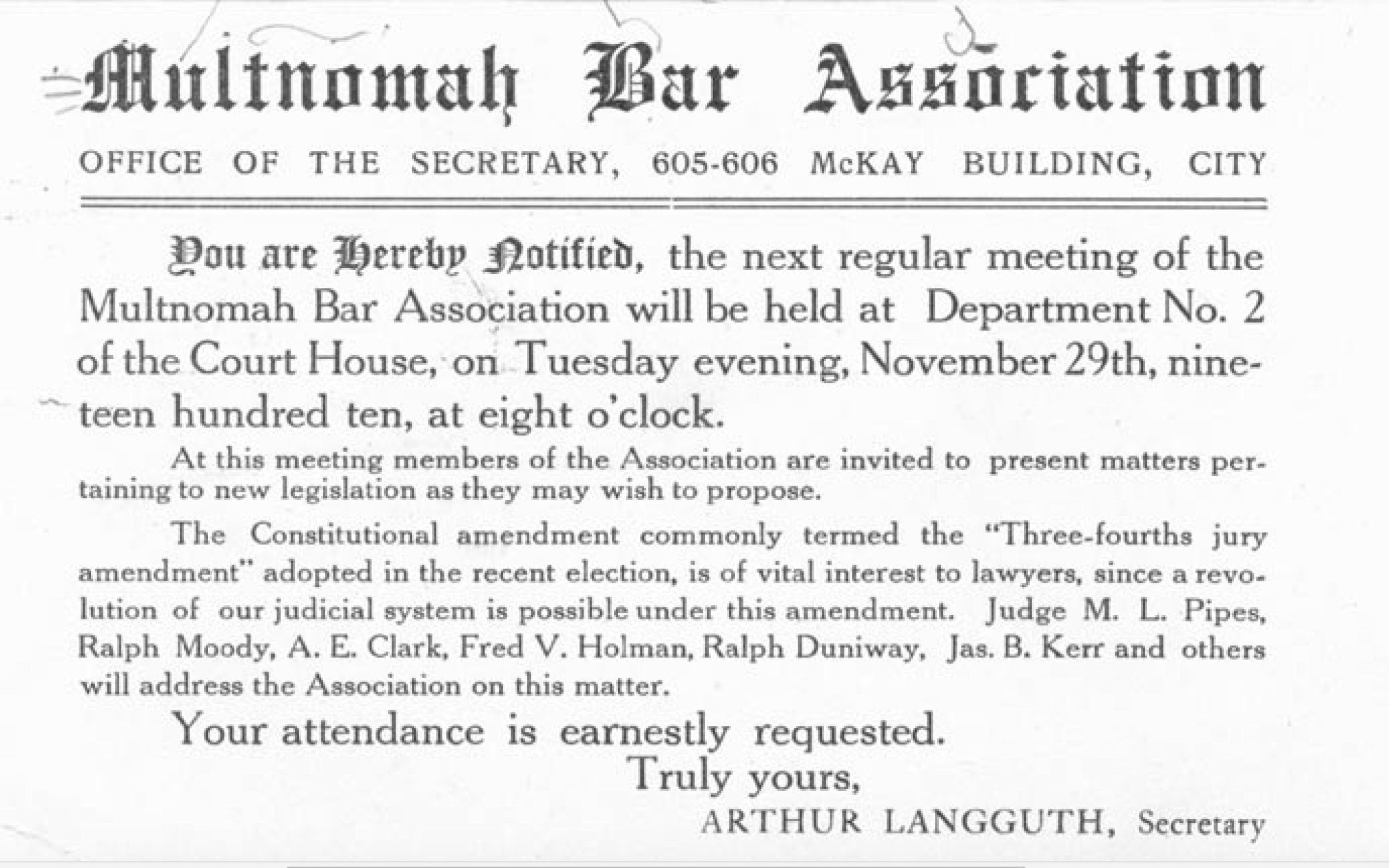
Invitation to attend the November 27, 1910 meeting of the Multnomah Bar Association to discuss the impact of recent legal changes that would allow non-unanimous verdicts in civil cases

In 1920, the Multnomah Bar association had the practice of sending a representative to each session of the Oregon Legislature to assist in putting through measures to facilitate procedures in court.

Over the years, MBA recommended, criticized, or involved itself in a large number of legislative and politicals. Some the proposals, such as the telegram to the Oregon congressional delegation advocating construction of a naval base at Astoria, Oregon, had little or nothing to do with the practice of law or the justice system.

=== Initiative and referendum ===
In March, 1911, there was a contested election for the president of the bar association. Lawyer Harrison Allen, who was on the staff of the Oregon Electric Railway Company, was standing for election as president, but received only a plurality of the votes due to opposition on grounds that Allen might too readily serve corporate interests. The opposition was led by W.M. Davis, who emphasized the need to "protect initiative, referendum, and "many other features of the 'Oregon Plan.'" Allen eventually was elected.

=== Reinstatement of capital punishment ===
Capital punishment in Oregon had been abolished by a referendum in 1914. At a meeting around late 1919, the bar association went on record as endorsing the reinstatement of capital punishment for first degree murder in Oregon.

=== Repeal of Prohibition ===
In March 1930, the Multnomah Bar Association conducted a secret poll of the approximately 800 lawyers in the county as to whether Prohibition should be repealed. Of the 250 lawyers who responded to the poll, wets (opposed to Prohibition) considerably outnumbered the "drys" (favoring Prohibition). Of the respondents 134 favored government dispensation of alcoholic beverages while only 49 voted no.

=== Non-partisan judiciary ===
From 1859 to 1931, judicial elections in Oregon were partisan, with each political party nominating its own candidate tor the judgeship.

The Multnomah Bar Association had long favored a non-partisan judiciary, going so far as drafting bills and causing them to be introduced in the Oregon State Legislature. These bills always went down to defeat, which one editorial writer ascribed to lawyers in the legislature who wanted to be legislatures themselves, and governors seeking to reward political backers with judgeships.

Non-partisanship existed only to the extent that some governors, such as Albin Norblad would appoint members of the opposing political party as judges.

The election of lawyer Julius Meier, an independent, to the governorship in 1930, gave hope to the prospect of non-partisan judges. Not long after he was elected, Meier gave a speech to the Multnomah Bar Association, urging adoption of the form and asking the bar association to send a draft of the enabling legislation. In 1931, the legislature passed a bill which made all judicial positions non-partisan.

=== Against court packing ===
In early 1937, President Franklin D. Roosevelt, frustrated with the Supreme Court's judicial attacks upon the New Deal, proposed the Judicial Procedures Reform Act, which if fully enacted would have given him the authority to appoint up to six additional justices to the Supreme Court. This became known as the "Court-packing plan" or the "court-packing scheme." At a meeting of the Multnomah County Bar Association on February 16, 1937, the association voted 87 to 17 in opposition to the court packing plan, and to convey the results of the vote to Oregon's congressional delegation.

=== Criticism of lawyer dishonesty ===
On April 9, 1914, the Morning Oregonian newspaper complained that "since the assassination of Ralph Fisher by the maniacal Jim Finch the lawyers have evidently lost interest in checking the rapacity of the male harpies and blood-suckers who disgrace the profession." On April 12, J.F. Boothe, president of the Multnomah Bar Association, responded to the "Crooked Lawyers editorial, Boothe stated in his response that "many things have been done by the Multnomah Bar Association with respect to disciplining its members which are not given out for prosecution. This association, within the past year, taken proceedings which have resulted in the discipline of some unprofessional members, and proceedings are pending against others."

Boothe further stated that MBA had "been in existence for a period of eight years and is doing everything in its power to maintain a high standard of professional conduct and ethics." "There is no duty the Bar Association so clearly owes the as a searching inquiry into the professional conduct of attorneys."

=== Constitution Day observances ===
In the United States, Constitution Day falls on September 17 every year, to mark the date of the signatures on the constitution by the delegates at the Constitutional Convention in 1787 in Philadelphia, Pennsylvania.

In 1929, the Multnomah Bar Association commemorated Constitution day using a poem written by Edna Garfield entitled "U.S. Constitution", and sent to her a letter of appreciation concerning the poem.

== 1959 innovations ==
In 1959 and 1960, the Multnomah Bar Association had 925 members and was serving a population of 600,000 persons. In those years, the association began several innovative programs. To encourage public interest in law and lawyers, MBA a radio program broadcast on KEX (AM) called "You and the Law." Prominent lawyers such as Arno Denecke narrated episodes with titles such as the "Case of the Slipping Rug”, "The Case of the After Hour's Ordinance”, and "The Case of the Binding Oral Promise.” The broadcasts also spread word of the availability of two other MBA programs, specifically the Legal Aid the Lawyer Referral services.

To improve the public perceptions of lawyers. the association established a speaker's bureau of 50 lawyers who were available to speak before civic and fraternal organizations. Topics included for example "Fifth Amendment: Crooks Cloak or Freeman's Safeguard?" and "Advocate - Cicero to Darrow to Your Lawyer".

The association also began a successful low-cost and convenient Continuing Legal Education program to improve the skills of practicing lawyers, and it took over from the Oregon State Bar, responsibili for the Multnomah County Legal Aid Bureau.

For this work, the American Bar Association voted at its 1960 annual meeting to honor MBA with its Award of Merit.

== Law library ==
The Multnomah Law Library was established in 1890 at the request of the court due to lack of legal reference materials. Lawyers raised over $10,000 to establish the library. The court appointed the grand jury bailiff to manage the library in addition to his other duties. The library was housed in the courthouse. The district attorney, and all state and federal courts had free use of the library. Otherwise, only lawyers who paid the $100 par value for a share, and an annual membership fee, were entitled to use the library.

Library shares were treated as other assets, and lawyers would sell them when they retired, along with their furniture and office equipment.

By the year 1900, the library had more than 10,000 books. In the early 1900s, lawyers were known to travel long distances to consult a good law library for their cases.

=== Early financial problems ===
After the first few years, the library could no longer sell shares because old members were dying or retiring, and their shares came on the market below par. (In 1907, three shares of Multnomah law library stock, which were held by an insolvent bank, were valued at $172 by the bank's receiver.).

By 1907 the library's funding could not keep up with expenses, not just for new materials, but also for rebinding books and a salary for a librarian when the bailfiff could not keep up with the work.

In an effort raise funds, the library opened up membership to persons who were not shareholders. The annual membership fee was $12 but special assessments for expenses raised the cost from $12 to $15 or $18. These dues, considered heavy at the time, caused membership to decline to just 75 lawyers.

In 1907, the Oregon State Legislature passed a law which required plaintiffs filing legal actions in circuit court to pay a surcharge of $1 in addition to the regular $10 filing fee, to support the law library association. For defendants, the surcharge was fifty cents in addition to the $5 first appearance fee.

=== Funding criticism ===
On August 7, 1913, Circuit Court Judge Henry E. McGinn, who was reported to have had an unusual juridical style, declared the surcharge law unconstitutional, saying it was unjust and a "burning shame that clients should have to pay for educating their lawyers."

Despite Judge McGinn's ruling, the fees continued to be collected, and in 1916, this attracted criticism in the Oregon Daily Journal.

Calculating that the law library had received $39,932 in surcharge fees, the Journal stated "it makes no difference how much is involved in the litigation, the library gets its toll whenever a complaint or answer is filed, and as a result of this system the lawyers of this city have built up at the expense of the litigants a library as wide in its scope as any law libraries in the west, excepting the state law libraries.

Two weeks later, the Journal published a letter in response, written by lawyer A.L. Veazie who was on the library board. Veazie explained the need for the library, and the benefits for the judicial system. He defended the surcharges as reasonable, noting that cases of less than $200 could be presented in minor courts with no library surcharge.

The Journal then brought a test case in the circuit court, alleging the surcharge was unconstitutional. The lawsuit was defeated when the defendants filed a demurrer which was sustained by Circuit Court Judge Davis.

=== Personnel ===
Lawyer John F. Logan was the first librarian. He had one assistant. In 1904, Logan resigned and was replaced by his assistant, Robert W. Galloway, who was also a lawyer. Fred R. Salway, born in 1876, began working for the law library in 1908 and continued until March 1, 1963, being succeed by Jacque Jurkins.

=== Later years to present ===
In 1954, the MBA board of directors announced a board resolution to take over the law library. Lawyer in MBA believed the library was not meeting their needs, and were concerned about possible mismanagement. In the following ten years, MBA was able to remove the old library board, and make the library a true non-profit organization.

== Legal aid service ==
=== Early services ===
In November 1912, the Associated Charities of Portland organized a legal aid department for which three local attorneys, Issac D. Hunt, Kingman Brewster, and Charles Delahunt Mahaffie, Sr., provided legal services pro bono. In the next twelve months the legal aid department handled 130 matters, including loan shark troubles, non-support, wage collection, and property rights. Mahaffie, a Rhodes Scholar, and later, from 1930 to 1955, a commissioner of the Interstate Commerce Commission was hired in 1913 to work full time for the Legal Aid Department.

=== Legal aid ===
In 1936, the Multnomah Bar Association, together with the Legal Aid Committee of the Oregon State Bar, set up a legal aid service to help people who could not afford lawyers, which was especially difficult during the Great Depression. The new legal aid service hired five staff attorneys, whose salaries were paid by the Works Progress Administration. Initially contributions from bar members paid for the expenses of the office, but in 1938 several local charities began paying those expenses.

During the Second World War, MBA volunteer lawyers provided free legal advice for members of the armed forces.

In 1960 the Multnomah Bar Association took over from the Oregon State Bar Association responsibility for the Multnomah County Legal Aid Bureau. In 1966 the legal aid service began receiving funds from the federal Office of Economic Opportunity.

As of 1970, the Multnomah Bar Association had established a Legal Aid Service, which had an office in the Senator Building, in Portland, Oregon. Charles J. Merten was the director of the service in November 1970.

Lawyers for the legal aid service won important cases including, in 1972, State v. Collman, which established the right of persons placed in mental commitment hearings to have counsel appointed by the court to act on their behalf. Lawyers for the service were also active in persuading the Oregon Legislature to enact the Residential Landlord Tenant Act in 1973, and, in 1977, the Family Abuse Prevention Act.

=== Later work ===
By 1976 the Legal Aid Service employed 25 attorneys. In that year, the service opened 6,700 new cases, of which approximately 2,500 were for advice only. In addition, over 2,000 people received free legal advice over a welfare "hot line."

In 1978, future US Senator Ron Wyden, who at that time was the Legal Services Developer for the elderly at Oregon Legal Services, proposed a partnership of MBA and several service agencies to provide low-income elderly citizens with legal services through a volunteer lawyer project. Fifty lawyers signed up as volunteers. The project is still in operation as of 2022.

== Lawyer referral service ==
In May 1956, the Multnomah Bar Association was working on setting up a lawyer referral service, which would be the first one in Oregon. The administrative details were still being worked out, but when finished, it would operate similar in principle to the more than 80 lawyer referral services then active in the United States. A standing MBA committee was to operate the program and screen lawyers volunteering for service on the panel.

== Minimum fee schedules ==
=== Early adoption ===
On the evening of March 31, 1906, the Multnomah Bar Association met at the department 1 of the Multnomah County Circuit Court, where besides the admission of 73 new members, the principal business was the appointment of a committee to report on a list of minimum fees to be charged by attorneys in Multnomah County. Oregon State Senator Dan J. Malarky, later to become president of the Oregon State Senate, was appointed as chairman of the minimum fee committee. A few weeks later, Senator Malarky announced that a full schedule of fees had been agreed on and would be submitted to the association for ratification at its meeting on the evening of April 28, 1906, at the circuit court.

This was the first attempt ever made to regulate the charges of attorneys in the city of Portland. By this time, almost all the attorneys in Multnomah County were members of the association and there was expected a large attendance at the meeting and "some warm debates" about the proposals. The schedule ultimately was adopted at the meeting and a month later was reported to "very satisfactory."

=== National minimum fees ===
In September 1917, the Commercial Law League of America established national minimum legal fees for legal services in commercial matters and began a campaign to induce bar associations around the United States to agree to follow the CLLA fee schedule. By January 10, 1918, a large number of bar associations, including the Multnomah County Bar Association, had agreed to charge commercial clients no less than the CLLA minimum fee schedule. According to CLLA, "what we are asking the attorneys of the country is that they refuse to do business on a scale of fees below that recommended by the League."

=== Fee minimums increased ===
In August 1918 the MBA's minimum fee schedule was increased following the recommendations of an MBA committee, again headed by Senator Malarky. Minimum fees were set for most areas of law, including among others criminal cases, domestic relations, probate, and bankruptcy. For example, minimum fees for misdemeanor criminal defense were raised from $25 to $50, and for felonies, from $50 to $100. Lawyers were permitted to charge higher fees, and often did.

=== Abandonment ===
In 1975, the Supreme Court of the United States ruled that bar association minimum fee schedules were not exempt from the Sherman Antitrust Act. As a result minimum fee schedules were abandoned nationwide.

== Previous role in disbarments ==
Before 1935, when disbarment proceedings were taken over by the newly formed Oregon State Bar Association, MBA played a major role in disbarment proceedings.

=== Procedure ===
As a voluntary association, MBA could terminate the membership of an attorney, but it had no legal power to directly bring a disbarment action against a lawyer. That could only be done by a proceeding in the Oregon Supreme Court.

Under the rules of the Multnomah Bar Association, complaints against lawyers were investigated by a grievance committee, which was supervised by three lawyers who were called "chancellors". If the chancellors and the grievance committee, found reasonable grounds to believe an attorney guilty of conduct meriting disbarment, they would initiate a disbarment proceeding against that attorney.

Disbarment proceedings were initiated by filing an accusation, formally called a relation, with the Oregon Supreme Court.

During the year 1915 the association's grievance committee held hearings in about 50 cases Most complaints were determined to be unfounded, although the committee's work did result in the disbarment of four lawyers.

In the first five months of 1922, the grievance committee of the Multnomah County Bar association, of which lawyer Hugh Montgomery was chairman, held 17 hearings, and had investigated more than 50 cases. Five attorneys had resigned rather than face public charges, and were reported to have been "endeavoring to make good losses to avoid criminal prosecution."

=== Typical cases ===
There are many reports of disbarment proceedings initiated by the Multnomah County Bar Association. For example, in June 1914, the MBA prosecutor sought information from the Multnomah County district attorney regarding three cases against who disbarment proceedings were either pending or were contemplated.

==== William I. Harrison (embezzlement) ====
In May 1922, lawyer William I. Harrison disappeared after the grievance committee of the Multnomah Bar Association began an investigation. Harrison was thought to have had obligations to clients totalling $2,500. Before his disappearance, Harrison sent resignation letters to the Multnomah and to the Oregon bar associations.

According to lawyer Bradley A. Ewers, chairman of the grievance committee, Harrison was accused of defrauding his clients in about ten different cases. Harrison's letter of resignation, sent the day he disappeared, asked that the bar association not give the letter to the press, and stated "shortly I will be able to reimburse all the claims."

At the time, presiding Multnomah County Circuit Court Judge Robert Tucker stated: "It is the fixed determination of the Multnomah Bar association to clean house. I can feel some sympathy for the poor beggar whose hunger and desperation forces him to steal, but a lawyer who takes advantage of the fiduciary relation existing between himself and a client, and the trust reposed in him, deserves scant consideration."

==== George Estes (embezzlement) ====
In July 1922, the Oregon Supreme Court was ready to break precedent by taking live testimony in disbarment proceedings initiated by the Multnomah Bar Association against Portland lawyer George Estes. Estes was disbarred on October 22, 1922 by order of the Oregon Supreme Court, for misappropriation of thousands of dollars of client funds. Similar charges, although involving less in client funds ($340), were also initiated by the bar association against lawyer Lon L. Parker.

==== Morris A. Goldstein (breach of loyalty) ====
The Multnomah Bar association initiated another disbarment proceeding in the early 1920s before the Oregon Supreme Court, this time against Portland lawyer Morris A. Goldstein. The court, pursuant to stipulation of the parties, appointed H.H. Belt, an Oregon Circuit Court judge in Dallas, Oregon, to act as the court's referee, to take and report the testimony, to make findings of fact and conclusions of law and to report the same to the supreme court.

Judge Belt found that Goldstein had manipulated a defendant's plea of guilty to reduce a loss, at his client's expense, to his non-lawyer business partner, one Long, who was a bail bondsman, from forfeiture of a bail bond, that Long had issued on an absconded co-defendant.

The Oregon Supreme Court, in an opinion by Chief Justice John L. Rand, agreed with Judge Belt, and Goldstein was disbarred by order dated December 27, 1923. Just over one year later, Goldstein sought reinstatement as a lawyer, on the claim that he had testimony that would refute the charges against him.

==== L.H. Tarpley (embezzlement) ====
The Multnomah County Bar Association initiated disbarment proceedings as late as 1927, when upon the relation of the association, the Oregon Supreme Court disbarred L.H. Tarpley for embezzlement of client funds and other financial misconduct.

==== J.G. Arnold (embezzlement and fraud) ====
In 1933, the Multnomah Bar Association initiated disbarment proceedings against lawyer J.G. Arnold, on charges of misappropriation of client funds. The Oregon Supreme Court assigned the matter to Judge Earl C. Latourette. Judge Latourette recommended a two-year suspension, with the case being heard at the supreme court on January 3, 1934.

Arnold was eventually disbarred for having forged an endorsement on a client's check payable to court reporter for a transcript for an appeal, and keeping the money for himself. With no transcript, the appeal failed. Arnold also defrauded vulnerable clients with false promises of investing their money, and stole funds he had collected for another client on a promissory note.

==== Frank A. McMenamin (fraud upon client) ====
In 1934, the Oregon Supreme Court, on the relation of the chancellors of the Multnomah Bar Association, entered an order of disbarment against lawyer Frank A. McMenamin, on charges of obtaining money by fraud and deceit. The case had been referred to Polk County circuit court Arlie G. Walker to take testimony and make recommendations. Walker had found that McMenamin obtained $5,000 from an elderly client for real estate investments based on false pretenses.

== Notable MBA presidents ==
- Lotus Lee Langley, MBA President 1916–17, later Multnomah County District Attorney, 1931–1935
- Robert Tucker, MBA President 1922–1924, Multnomah County Circuit Court Judge.
- Randall B. Kester, MBA President 1956–57, later associate Justice of the Oregon Supreme Court 1957–58.
- Clifford B. Olsen, MBA President 1969-7Jacqueline Alarcón, Multnomah County Circuit Court judge in Multnomah County,1969–1989.
- Edwin J. Peterson, MBA president 1972–73, later Chief Justice of the Oregon Supreme Court.
- John R. "Jack" Faust, prominent attorney, MBA president 1974–75.
- Garr M. King, MBA president 1975–76, later U.S. District Court Judge for the District of Oregon.
- Thomas H. Tongue, III, MBA president 1976–1977, Associate Justice of the Oregon Supreme Court, 1969–1982.
- Jacqueline Alarcón, MBA president 2022–2023, Multnomah County Circuit Court judge, appointed July 1, 2022.

== See also ==
- Oregon State Bar Association
