= Cedric Lee Hayden =

American politician

Member of the Oregon House of Representatives from the 43rd district
- In office 2001–2003
- Preceded by: Jim Welsh
- Succeeded by: Deborah Kafoury

Member of the Oregon House of Representatives from the 28th district
- In office 1993–1997
- Preceded by: Fred Parkinson
- Succeeded by: Roger Beyer

Member of the Oregon House of Representatives from the 38th district
- In office 1985–1993
- Preceded by: Chuck Bennett
- Succeeded by: Patti Milne

Personal details
- Born: August 4, 1934 (age 92) Eugene, Oregon
- Party: Republican
- Education: University of Oregon; Washington University in St. Louis; Loma Linda University
- Profession: Dentist, Christmas tree farmer

Cedric Lee Hayden (born August 4, 1934) is an American politician who was a member of the Oregon House of Representatives. His son, Cedric Ross Hayden, currently serves in the Oregon House of Representatives.

Born in Eugene, Oregon, Hayden was a dentist and attended the University of Oregon, Washington University School of Dental Medicine (DDS), and Loma Linda University (MPH).
