= Chuck Bennett (politician) =

American politician (born 1948)

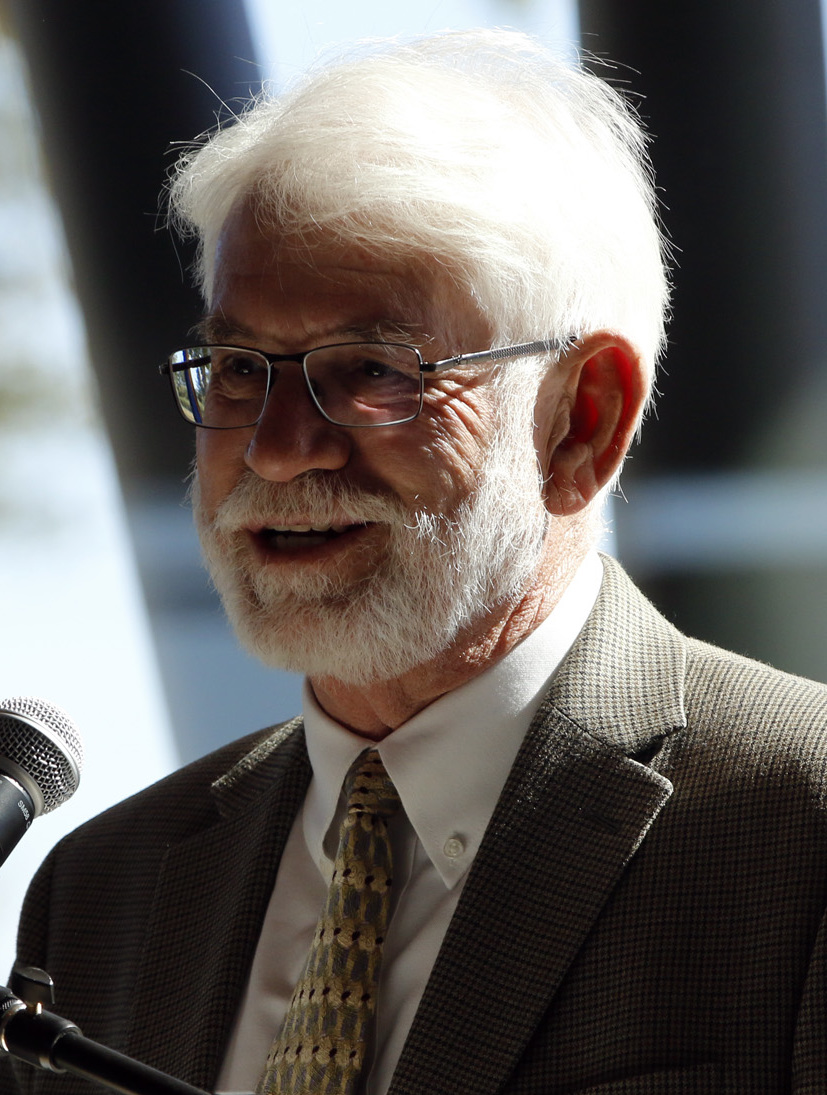

Mayor of Salem
- In office January 1, 2017 – November 2, 2022
- Preceded by: Anna M. Peterson
- Succeeded by: Chris Hoy

Member of the Oregon House of Representatives from the 38th district
- In office January 10, 1983 – January 12, 1985
- Preceded by: Max Rijken
- Succeeded by: Cedric Lee Hayden

Personal details
- Born: 1948 (age 77–78)
- Party: Democratic
- Spouse: Cherie Bennett
- Children: 1
- Education: Willamette University (BA)
- Chuck Bennett's voice Bennett opens a monthly video where he talks about Salem; Recorded August 3, 2020

Chuck Bennett (born 1948) is an American politician who formerly served as mayor of Salem, Oregon, and is a former state representative.

== Biography ==
Bennett graduated from Willamette University in 1970 and became a journalist. He was later elected to the Oregon House of Representatives in 1982 (after an unsuccessful 1978 run), and to the Salem city council from Ward 1 in 2006. He unsuccessfully ran for mayor in 2010, losing to Anna M. Peterson. Bennett once again ran for mayor in 2016 and won. On October 18, 2022, Bennett announced his resignation as mayor, which took effect on November 2, 2022. Chris Hoy, who won the election for mayor and was set to take office in 2023, instead took office immediately following Bennett’s leave from office, on November 2, 2022.

== Personal life ==
Bennett and his wife Cherie have 1 child.

Political offices
Preceded by Anna M. Peterson	Mayor of Salem; 2017–2022	Succeeded by Chris Hoy
