= Puntland Women Lawyers Association =

Somali organization promoting women's access to legal representation

Puntland Women Lawyers Association (PUWLA) is a Somali organization that had visible impact on communities in the Puntland region in the aspect of legal services and access to justice for women, which changed the status quo. Through PUWLA, Puntland women seek legal aid for cases of abuse, neglect, rape, and other crimes. It is often said that Somali culture stigmatizes women who go to court to file a complaint about a male perpetrator, be it her husband, brother, cousin, or even a stranger, despite the fact that it is a right in Islamic law and the Somali constitution. In this culture, the woman is supposed to go through her clan membership, which requires following a hierarchy by first going to her male relative or traditional elder, who in turn would reach out to the traditional elder of the male perpetrator. But this changed with PUWLA free services because women are seeking the protection of the law.

The movement started when female graduates from the Faculty of Law of one of the local universities decided to combine their human energy to provide services to the community using their legal skills and as a result they established an initiative to provide free legal services to the community. The organization has two offices in Puntland, one office in Garowe, the capital city of Puntland, and another in Bossaso, the commercial hub. The services they provide include legal counseling, mediation, and appointing lawyers that represent women in criminal cases. PUWLA works with many actors including Puntland Police, the Attorney General's office, Ministry of Justice, and both military and civil courts in the region. PUWLA currently has 25 members that perform different duties within the organization, including lawyers, paralegals, GBV case workers, human rights officers, and advocates and lobbyists that work closely with the Ministry of Justice to influence policy making. Some of the cases they undertake include rape cases, Gender-based violence (GBV) cases, and other crimes against women.
