= Oregon State Bar =

Bar Association

Coordinates: 45.404476°N 122.751145°W

Agency overview
- Formed: 1935
- Jurisdiction: Oregon
- Headquarters: Tigard, Oregon, USA
- Employees: 95
- Annual budget: $14 million
- Parent agency: Oregon Judicial Department
- Website: www.osbar.org

The Oregon State Bar (OSB) is a public corporation and instrumentality of the Oregon Judicial Department in the U.S. state of Oregon. Founded in 1890 as the private Oregon Bar Association, it became a public entity in 1935 that regulates the legal profession. The public corporation is part of the Oregon Judicial Department.

Lawyers are required to join the OSB in order to practice law in Oregon, unless an exception applies.

OSB is charged with administering lawyer admissions and discipline, pursuant to rules proposed by bar association and approved by the Oregon Supreme Court. It also administers the Legal Services Program which funds legal aid in Oregon and provides accountability by maintaining standards and guidelines for legal aid providers.

OSB is governed by a 19 person Board of Governors — 15 of the board's members are lawyers, and four are public members.

== Summary ==
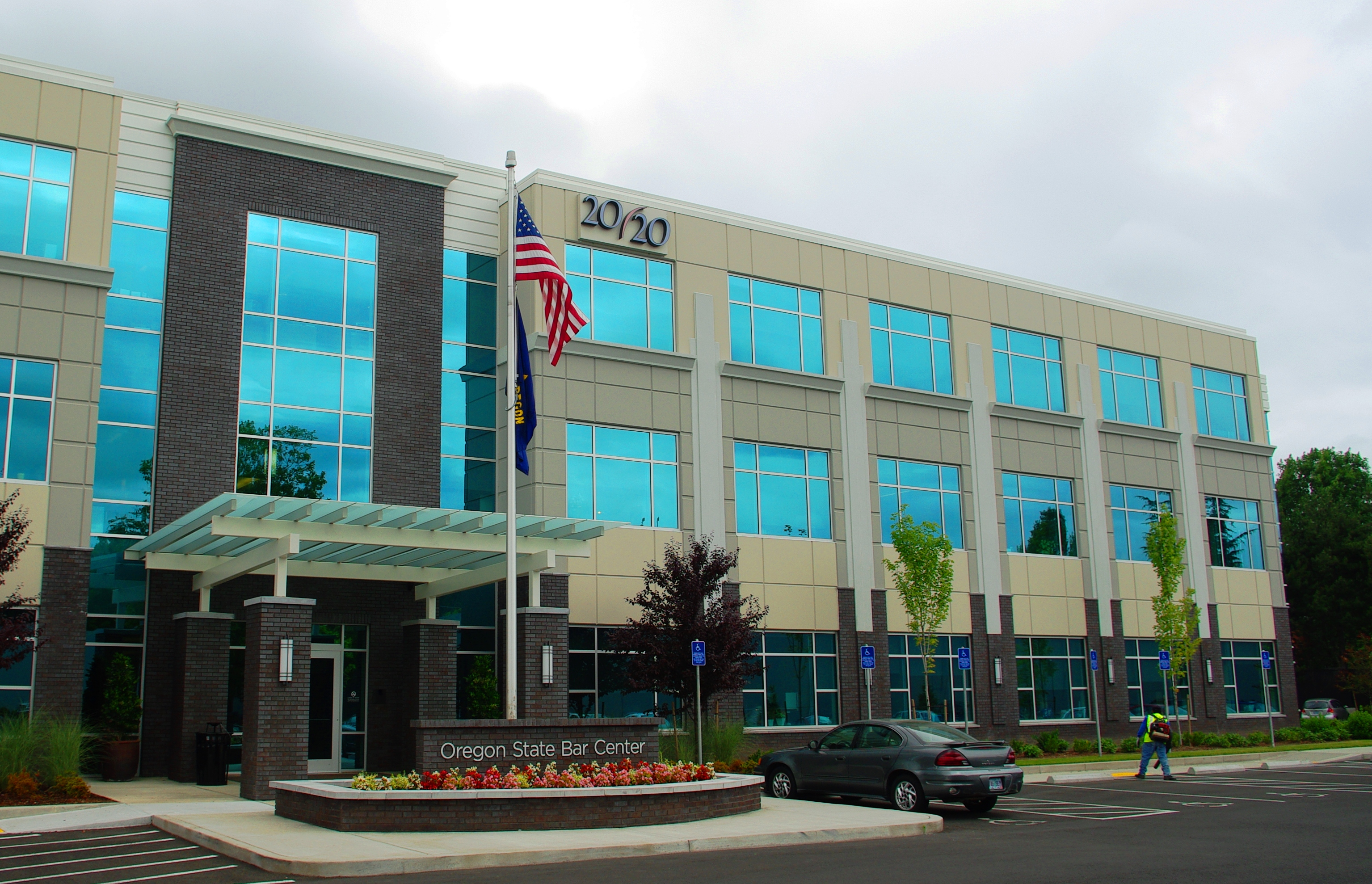
Offices in Tigard

Oregon has an "integrated bar": all attorneys in Oregon are required to join the Oregon State Bar if they desire to practice law in Oregon.

Membership fees and program fees from the 16,000 active members, together with revenue from bar programs, fund the entire budget of the agency. OSB has approximately 100 employees and is overseen by a Board of Governors. This 19 person board group along with the 200-member House of Delegates and the Oregon Supreme Court provide governance for the agency's activities.

OSB also administers a board on attorney discipline and the Board of Bar Examiners. Additionally, the bar makes recommendations for filing mid-term judicial vacancies in the courts of the Oregon Judicial Department. These recommendations are given to the Governor of Oregon who makes the final appointment decision.

Most lawyers in private practice are also required to participate in the Oregon Professional Liability Fund, a self-funded insurance program. As of 2006, the program premium was $3,000 per year for $300,000 in coverage. Oregon was the first state to adopt the mandatory insurance scheme for attorneys.

OSB administers several programs to facilitate finding legal representation. The bar's Lawyer Referral Service has around 600 attorneys statewide that practice every area of law. The service receives around 75,000 calls per year and makes approximately 50,000 referrals. The Modest Means Program offers reduced fee representation in family law, criminal law, and landlord/tenant cases.

The Problem Solvers Program offers a free 30-minute consultation to teens aged 13–17. The Military Assistance Panel offers two hours of pro bono work to active duty military members. The Lawyer-to-Lawyer Program connects lawyers with more experienced attorneys who are willing to give guidance over the phone at no cost.

== Name ==
The Oregon Bar Association (OBA) was a voluntary association from 1890 to 1935. During its existence, OBA was also commonly referred to as the "Oregon State Bar Association" even though that was not its formal name.

The "Oregon State Bar" (OSB) is a public corporation established in 1935 by the Oregon Legislature to replace OBA. In popular usage, the term "Oregon Bar Association" has been often used to describe OSB.

== History ==
The Oregon Bar Association was organized on November 8, 1890. One vice-president was selected from each of the seven judicial districts of Oregon. The original bar association was not created by a statute and was not incorporated. Membership was voluntary, although as of July 1, 1927, any lawyer who became a member of a local bar association was automatically deemed to be a member of the Oregon Bar association.

The first president of the Oregon Bar Association was Cyrus A. Dolph, a prominent lawyer who had begun practice in Portland, Oregon in 1866. The bar association's first annual meeting was held on October 17, 1891, in Portland. The constitution and by-laws of the association provided for committees on (1) jurisdiction and statutory reform, (2) judicial administration and remedial proceedings, (3) legal education and admission to the bar, (4) grievances as to alleged misconduct by lawyers, and (5) admission and membership. There was also an executive committee elected by the association, with other members appointed the association's president.

By 1900, the work of the first three committees was found to have overlapped on occasion, and the legislative affairs committee had endorsed too many bills, thereby losing some of the association's credibility with the legislature, which had its own institutional problems in the 1890s The grievance committee investigated allegations of misconduct by the public, and if they were found to be well-founded, would bring proceedings against the lawyer in the Supreme Court of Oregon It was reported in 1900 that "many complaints are brought on misunderstanding, mostly occurring out of ill-formed arrangements between so-called lawyers who solicit bad collections and their clients."

=== Early disciplinary proceedings ===
As of October 19, 1895, the Oregon Bar Association was working towards the disbarment of eight attorneys, on grounds of false undertakings in attachment and admiralty proceedings, gross drunkenness and misbehavior in court, uttering false certificates for admission of Chinese immigrants, false statements to a notary public, falsifying documents purporting to show payment a debt to an estate, defamation and extortion, embezzlement, larceny, and misappropriation of funds held in trust held for clients.

One of the attorneys, U.S. Grant Marquam, who was charged with misappropriation of client funds, was the son of millionaire and prominent politician Philip A. Marquam. Four of the eight lawyers had been convicted of crimes forming the basis for the disbarment proceedings, and one of those four was already in the state penitentiary.

=== Advertising restrictions ===
In 1892, a lawyer ran an advertisement in several daily newspapers which stated: "Divorces a specialty; reliable advice, prompt, attention and moderate fee; no fee until after divorce. Apply Attorney, room 3 at 280½ Washington street, comer Fourth, City." The Grievance Committee found that the advertisement was neither illegal nor grounds for disbarment, but criticized it as being unprofessional. During a discussion of the advertisement, grievance committee member L.B. Cox objected to the attorney's not listing his name and further promising no fee until the divorce was concluded, and argued that these factors were grounds for disbarment. A motion was then passed to refer the matter back to the Grievance Committee with instructions to bring it to the attention of the supreme court.

In 1908 the American Bar Association (ABA) approved 32 "Canons of Professional Ethics." In 1935, those Canons were adopted, in part, by the Oregon Supreme Court and the then-recently organized Oregon State Bar Association. ABA Ethics Canon 27 stated that it was unprofessional conduct for a lawyer to solicit business by advertising.

Many years later, broad bar association restrictions on lawyer advertising were stricken down in Bates v. State Bar of Arizona as violations of the First Amendment guarantee of freedom of speech. Even after Bates, bar associations were still free to regulate advertising that was "false, deceptive, or misleading." Under OSB rules in effect in 2022, the text 1892 advertisement would likely subject the lawyer to discipline, as it is required that the advertisement include the lawyer's name. Current bar rules further forbid a lawyer from charging "any fee in a domestic relations matter, the payment or amount of which is contingent upon the securing of a divorce."

=== Murder of bar prosecuting counsel ===
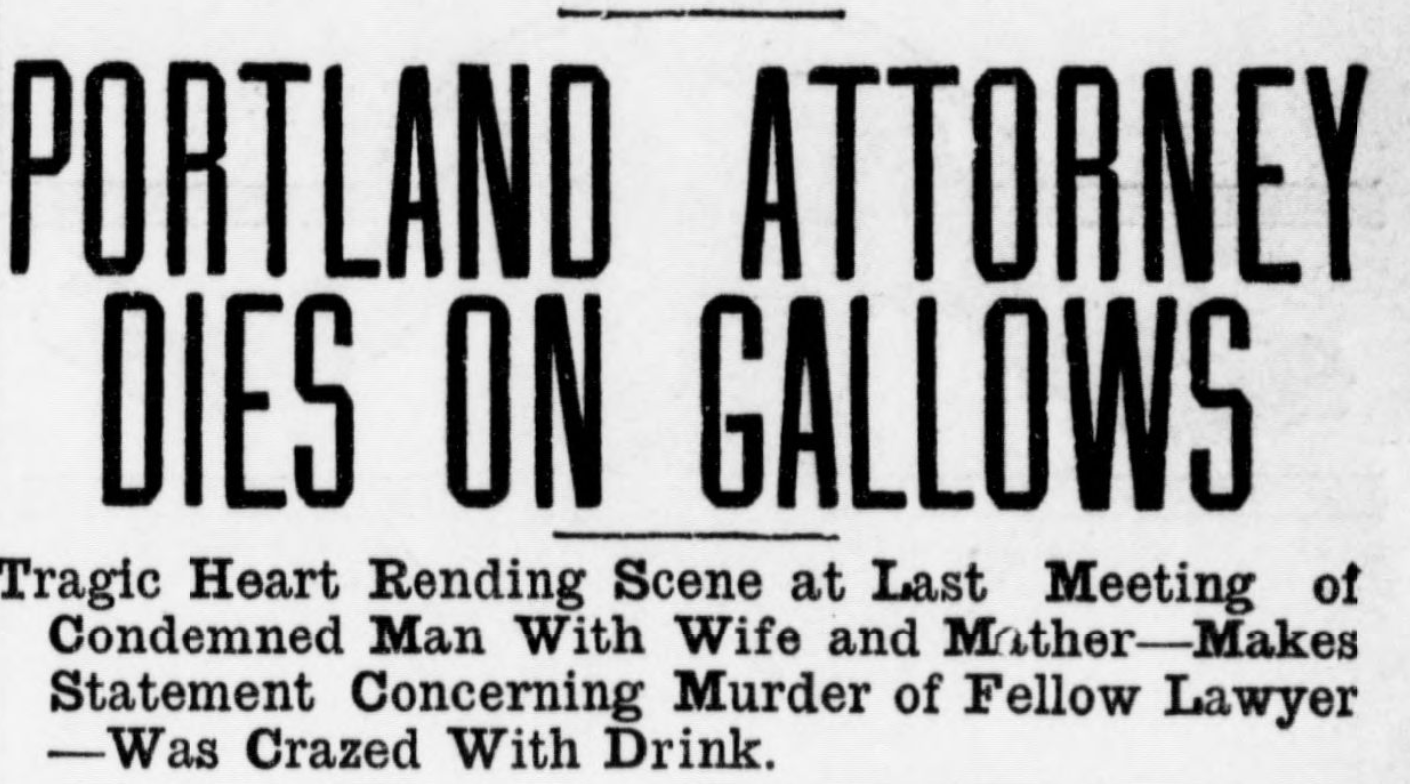
Newspaper headline reporting execution of James A. Finch for the murder of bar association prosecuting attorney Ralph B.Fisher.

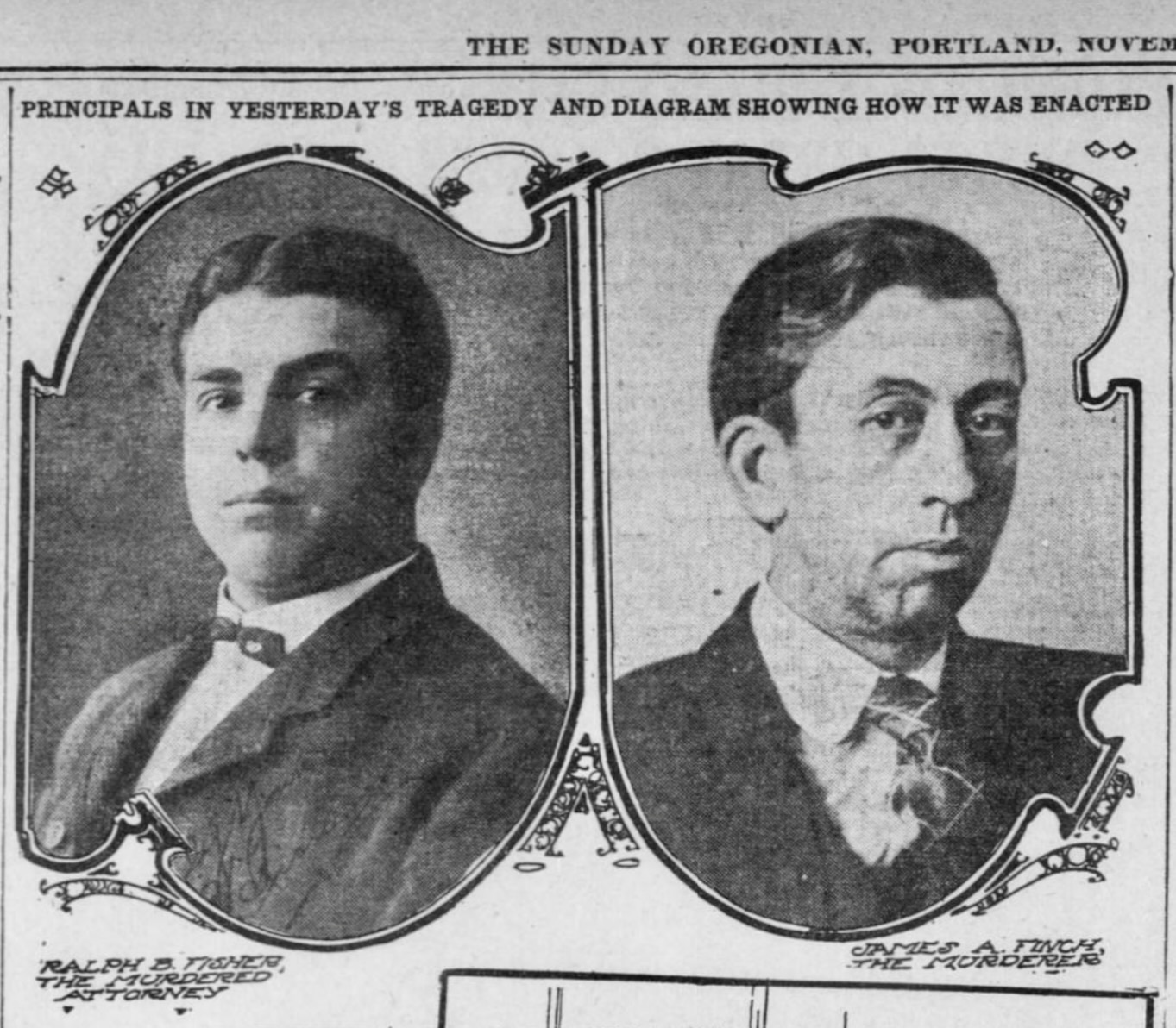
Ralph B. Fisher, attorney (left), victim of murder by James A Finch, attorney (right)

On the afternoon of Saturday, November 28, 1908, attorney Ralph B. Fisher, who had been the prosecutor for the grievance committee of the Oregon State Bar Association was shot and killed in his Portland office in the Mohawk Building by former attorney James Anderson Finch.

Finch had been disbarred for having appeared in court in an intoxicated condition and forging the name and notarial seal of his law partner to an affidavit. Fisher had presented the disbarment case against Finch to the Oregon Supreme Court.

Wire stories reported Fisher had refused to help Finch be reinstated into the bar. The evidence though was that Fisher, even though the bar's prosecutor in a clear case against Finch, had aided him by urging the Supreme Court to find him capable of reform and not impose full disbarment, but rather a suspension only, a recommendation which the court followed.

The Oregon Daily Journal broadly portrayed Finch as mediocre lawyer and a drunk, with revenge as his motive. The Sunday Oregonian provided details such as the nature of the disbarment proceedings for Finch.

Finch was subsequently convicted of murder and sentenced to death. Governor Frank W. Benson refused to commute the sentence, even though the petition was taken to him personally by Finch's wife, to whom he had been married less than a year. Finch was executed by hanging at Salem on November 12, 1909, in a scene reported luridly in the newspapers.

=== Qualifications to practice ===
At the bar association's annual convention in 1903, lawyer A.F. Flegel proposed the adoption of measures proposed by the committee on legal education and admission to the bar to raise the standard of general and legal education in the legal profession in the state. Lawyer R.R. Duniway objected to any change which would make it more difficult for applicants to practice, saying that he could not have practiced if the requirements proposed by the committee had been in effect when he was admitted to the bar. Duniway's remarks that "there is no use in trying to shut out some man who don't know very much, but who would make a rattling good lawyer" were reported to have excited "much amusement", but even so the motion was adopted.

In 1913, the Oregon Supreme Court created a five-member Board of Bar Examiners, appointed by the Oregon Bar Association for three year terms, to determine the qualifications of applicants to the bar, and make recommendations to the supreme court as to whether they should be admitted. Before then, candidates for admission had been examined by the court itself, or by its designees.

In November 1915 the board of examiners of the bar association proposed new educational requirements for admission to practice. According to a newspaper article published in November 1915, there were hundreds of lawyers in Oregon unable cope with the difficult legal conditions of the time, who had passed the bar examination "when that barricade was more or less a joke.". The same article continued to state that "[i]t was customary to pass every applicant for a certificate to practice law in this state, and no matter how little the applicant knew of law, he had a reasonable assurance that he would get that certificate."

Under the 1915 proposal, candidates for admission to the bar would be required to have at least a high school education or its equivalent, and would have to show that they had studied law for three years. It was not until 1941 that graduation from an approved law school became a requirement for admission.

=== Involvement in Espionage Act prosecution ===
Henry Albers was a well-known German-American businessman and a principal in the Albers Brothers milling business, which was then a well-established Oregon firm. On October 21, 1918, Albers was arrested in Portland, Oregon and charged with violation of the Espionage Act of 1917. Affidavits of a deputy U.S. marshall, and others, alleged that on October 8, 1918, while on passenger train running from Grants Pass to Roseburg, Oregon, Albers had said "he was a German and proud of it, and that his brothers were also pro-German."

Albers was also accused of saying "the United States could never lick the Kaiser in a thousand years" and, further, that he had abused Secretary of the Treasury McAdoo. Albers, who had been born in Germany in 1866, and who had become a naturalized citizen in 1900, was under the influence of liquor at the time. After a jury trial in early February 1919 in Portland, Albers was found guilty. On March 17, 1919, Albers was sentenced to three years of penal servitude at the U.S. penitentiary on McNeil Island and to pay a $10,000 fine. Albers filed an appeal. and was at liberty while it was pending.

In February, the Ninth Circuit Court of Appeals denied Albers' appeal. In June, 1920, the Albers case was accepted by the United States Supreme Court on a petition for a writ of certiorari.

In April 1921, when the case was called for oral argument, Solicitor General of the United States William L. Frierson conceded there had been an error in the Albers case, and moved to vacate the conviction. The error appears to have been the admission of evidence of alleged pro-German statements by Albers before war had been declared.

The Oregon Bar Association then attempted to intervene in the case as a non-party. The bar association sent a telegram to Oregon's U.S. Senator Charles L. McNary which requested that the senator go before the Supreme Court and move for a stay of the order reversing the conviction of Albers. The bar protested the action of the Department of Justice in confessing error in the case, which had resulted in the case being remanded to the U.S. district court in Oregon.

The telegram further asked that the bar association be given the privilege of appearing in the case at a hearing on the merits. McNary, acting as lawyer for the bar association, presented a formal petition to the Supreme Court. The court, in a one-sentence opinion, denied the bar association's effort to intervene in the case.

Albers died of a stroke on July 27, 1921 at his home in Milwaukie, Oregon, before any remanded proceedings could occur in U.S. district court.

=== The Oregon Law Review ===
The Oregon Law Review began publication in 1921, with the first editor being Prof. Thomas A. Larrimore. By 1933 it was a quarterly publication and the official organ of the Oregon Bar Association, with a mailing list of 1350 names. After the bar association was formally incorporated as a public agency in 1935, the Oregon Law Review was sent out to all members of the bar who paid the statutory fee.

=== Bar examination ===
As of July, 1925, the state board of bar examiners was conducting the bar examination.

In 1931 the bar examination was given on July 15. Of the one hundred and three (103) persons who took the examination, forty five (45) passed. Another source reported that the bar passage rate for the 1931 examination was "about 60 per cent." There were a number of applicants taking the examination for the second time. At that time, an applicant who did not pass on the second time could not take the examination again unless special permission were granted.

On May 5, 1933, the bar association voted in favor of a five-year academic course for admission to the legal profession.

=== Minimum fee schedules ===
Bar associations used to promulgate and enforce fee schedules as one of their more common activities.

The Oregon State Bar Association promulgated a minimum fee schedule before World War II. The schedule set fee guidelines for a variety of common legal services. "For example, the schedule suggested that lawyers charge $250 for preparing an uncontested divorce. Simple wills and adoptions with no controversy are set at $30 and $100 respectively."

OSB adopted its first statewide minimum fee schedule on September 29, 1938 after lengthy debate at the annual bar convention. Originally the proposal was to set minimum fees that would double in counties with more than 100,000 population, of which at that time there was only one, Multnomah County. The convention then voted to apply the Multnomah County schedule to the entire state.

==== Local schedules ====
Proposals to establish or raise minimum lawyer fees were made in Oregon by local bar associations. In 1907, the Umatilla County Bar Association was formed, and at the first organizational meeting, it established a detailed schedule of minimum fees. Each member of the new bar association pledged not to charge less than the minimum schedule of fees, and not to associate with any attorney who did so.

The Jackson County bar association was newly formed in the summer of 1919, with "the immediate business of the new organization would be to standardize and lift lawyers' fees so as to make them conform with the cost of living."

After adoption of the state-wide fee schedules in 1938, county bar associations were still free to adopt their own minimum fee schedules provided they were approved by the Board of Governors of the state bar. Marion County did so in December 1938. It "increased certain of the minimum fees from its depression-established schedule but in nearly all instances the new list remained below fees prescribed in the approved at the state bar convention [in Salem] last fall."

Marion County's minimum fees for an uncontested divorce were raised to $75, up $25, which restored the fee to its pre-depression minimum. Minimum fees were set lower than the state schedule, for such matters as office calls, examining abstracts, appealing cases to the Oregon Supreme Court and bankruptcy petitions. For example the county set a minimum fee of $2 for office calls seeking oral advice, with the state minimum fee at $5.

In January 1939, lawyers of Washington County similarly protested that the state fee schedule was too high and "discrediting to the profession." The lawyers passed a motion stating their own county's fee schedule conformed better to the conditions in Washington County.

==== Forced abandonment ====
The bar association's minimum fee schedule was still in effect in the early 1960s. By the early 1970s, these minimum fee schedules were being criticized as having the true purpose to provide "a minimum income level for lawyers above that which would prevail in a free market."

In 1974, the United States Department of Justice brought a legal action against the Oregon State Bar Association, alleging that by use of minimum fee schedules, the association was violating federal antitrust statutes.

The Oregon State Bar sought summary judgment in its favor, arguing that it was not liable under the "state action" and "learned profession" exemptions to the Sherman Antitrust Act. On November 19, 1974, the U.S. district court in Portland, Oregon ruled against the bar association, opening the association up to Sherman Act liability.

Within six weeks the bar association abandoned its minimum fee schedule. Not long after that the United States Supreme Court, in Goldfarb v. Virginia State Bar, reached the same result as did the district court in the Oregon case.

=== Former Communist Party members ===
Applicants for admission to the bar were and remain required to establish that they are persons of good moral character. In the 1950s and early 1960s, membership in the Communist Party was considered highly suspect, and in at least one state (Florida) was considered, at least in dicta, to be per se grounds for denial of admission. In 1957, the United States Supreme Court ruled in Konigsberg vs. State Bar and in Schware v. Board of Bar Examiners that previous membership in the Communist Party could not by itself suffice to prevent a bar applicant from proving that he was a person of good moral character.

In Oregon, Frank V. Patterson, passed the bar in 1953, but was denied admission because of his previous affiliation with the Communist Party, Aided by the American Civil Liberties Union, Patterson sought and was granted review in the United States Supreme Court, which reversed the Oregon Supreme Court, and ordered the Oregon court to review the matter in light of the then-recent Konigsberg and Schware decisions. On remand, the bar's decision to deny Patterson admission was upheld by the Oregon Supreme Court. Another applicant, Nick Chaivoe, who had allegedly been a Communist, had been denied admission to the bar in the early 1950s. (Chaivoe was eventually admitted to the bar in 1963.)

When Bernard Jolles applied for admission to the bar in 1963, the bar opposed his admission based on the fact that when seeking admission to his law school, Northwestern School of Law, that he had not disclosed that he had previously been a member of the Communist Party. Jolles was fully aware of the Patterson decision, and developed his legal strategy with that case in mind.

The Oregon Supreme Court, finding that Jolles had abandoned his allegiance to the Communist Party, admitted him to the bar association on a 4-2 vote, with then-recently appointed Justice Arno Denecke recusing himself. Jolles still could not practice in federal court, because, although normally a matter of course, his application for admission to the bar of the U.S. District Court for Oregon was delayed for two years. Jolles believed that District Court judge Gus J. Solomon was eventually instrumental in securing Jolles' admission. Twenty-five years later, in 1987, Jolles became president of the Oregon State Bar Association.

== Incorporation of the bar as a public agency ==
=== Early proposals ===
On January 3, 1933, it was reported that at a closed door meeting of the executive directors of the bar association, there had been a discussion of presenting to the legislature a proposal to incorporate the bar association and giving it disciplinary authority over its members. The measure was said to have had the objective of raising the standard of legal practice.

The bill was introduced in the Oregon House of Representatives on February 9, 1933 by the committee on the judiciary. Under the terms of the 1933 bill, all persons then entitled to practice law in the State of Oregon, including judges of the supreme, circuit, and the district courts, and, with their consent, the judges of the U.S. district court, would become members of the Oregon State Bar association.

The bill provided for a board of governors of three members for each of Oregon's three congressional districts. The bill would give the Board of Governors, the authority, by a two-thirds vote following a hearing, to make a recommendation to the Oregon Supreme Court for the disbarment of any member of the bar.

=== Establishment as a public corporation ===
A bill similar to the proposed 1933 legislation was introduced in the 1935 legislature on January 29 by the joint Senate and House judiciary committee. With the approval of the Oregon Supreme Court, the board of governors would have the power to appoint a committee to examine applicants and make recommendations to the supreme court for admission to practice law. Any inactive member, or persons suspended or disbarred, who were to practice law could be charged with a misdemeanor, and if convicted, could be subject to a fine of $500 or imprisonment for up to six months, or both.

On January 31, 1935, after nearly an hour of debate, the bill was passed by the Oregon senate by a vote of 21 to 9. According to a contemporary report, "objection to the measure centered on the contention that such legislation would hit at the 'little' lawyers and would not be workable in regard to the more prominent practitioners."

Senator William H. Strayer, of Baker contended that no lawyer should be compelled to join such an association. It was reported that as he voted, Strayer declared that "the skids are greased and I'm in a revival meeting. I vote no."

By February 20, 1935, the bill had been passed by the Oregon House of Representatives and signed by governor Charles H. Martin. The legislation took effect on June 12, 1935.

Every active lawyer was required to be a member of the newly incorporated Oregon State Bar Association. In 1935 the annual membership fee was $3.

=== Purpose of incorporation ===
In August 1935, Oscar Hayter, one of the most prominent attorneys in the state, and soon to be one of the first board of governors of the new association, gave a speech to the Salem Rotary Club in which he outlined some of the goals of the incorporated bar. Hayter, who had been deeply involved in setting up the integrated bar, stated: "Under the plan of the integrated bar, the profession hopes to build itself up so its members are above reproach in their dealings. We cannot make men angels overnight, but the new organization, with definite standards and officers, should be able to accomplish much."

=== Governing body and initial officers ===
The governing body of the incorporated bar association was a nine-member Board of Governors. Three governors came from each of the (then) three Congressional districts. Each district also had a three-member trial committee.

The first president of the Oregon State Bar was Portland attorney Robert F. Maguire. In addition to President Maguire, the first board of governors comprised attorneys Oscar Hayter, of Dallas, Circuit Court Judge James T. Brand, of Marshfield, Allan G. Carson, of Salem, H.H. DeArmond, of Bend, Colon R. Eberhard, of La Grande, A.A. Smith, of Baker, Arthur M. Geary, and Nicholas Jaureguy, both of Portland. Arthur H. Lewis was treasurer and F.M. Sercombe, also from Portland, was secretary.

=== Involvement of law instructors ===
University of Oregon law school dean, and later U.S. senator Wayne L. Morse was appointed in November 1935 to the committee on legal education and admission. In addition to practicing law, board member Jaurgegay taught, from 1922 to 1942, evidence, negotiable instruments, and trusts at Northwestern School of Law, in Portland, where he was said to have "set extremely high standards for himself and for his students."

== Opposition to Supreme Court expansion ==
On February 5, 1937, President Franklin D. Roosevelt, frustrated by New Deal legislation being struck down by the Supreme Court on what were perceived by critics of the court to be dubious constitutional grounds, announced he would support legislation which, if enacted would increase the number of justices on the court from nine to up to fifteen. The formal name of the legislation was the Judicial Procedures Reform Bill of 1937, and it came to be called the "court-packing plan."

After the announcement, an OSB committee sent out a poll to 2,200 members of the bar as to whether they supported or opposed the court-packing plan. On March 6, 1937, Frank P. Keenan, chairman of the committee, announced that 1,640 ballots had been returned, and these ran against the plan by a five to one ratio, specifically 266 votes for and 1,383 votes against.

== Code of ethics ==
As initially organized, the bar association did not have a formal code of legal ethics. In 1907, at its seventeenth annual meeting, at the Pioneer Courthouse, the association declined to adopt a code.

== Resignation from the bar ==
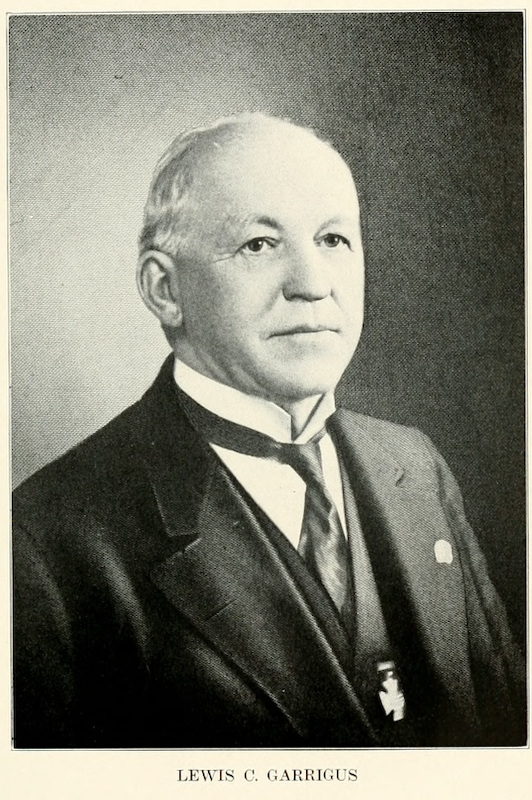
Lewis C. Garrigus, Portland lawyer who resigned in 1895 under threat of disbarment for embezzlement, and was readmitted to the bar ten years later.

=== Early procedure ===
Lawyers in the early years of the bar association could avoid disbarment by resignation, and this was done by two of the eight then facing charges, specifically Harold Pilkington and Lewis C. Garrigus.

Garrigus was able to have himself reinstated to the bar in 1905. Harold Pilkington was sentenced to prison for two years for embezzlement, but he may have been able to have himself reinstated in 1914 despite his previous resignation, as there is reported to have a man of the same name having been admitted to the bar in that year. Only a few years later, the Oregon Supreme Court ruled that an attorney's resignation would no longer be effective if disbarment were pending.

=== Form B resignation ===
A Form B resignation is the functional equivalent of being disbarred from a Bar association, and means that the submitting member of the bar resigned while facing disciplinary charges from the bar tribunal. Members of the Oregon State bar who enter a Form B Resignation are not eligible to be readmitted to the bar again.

=== Permanent disbarment ===
Until December 31, 1995, disbarred lawyers could apply for reinstatement five years after the effective date of their disbarment. As of January 1, 1996, disbarment is permanent. Oregon is one of the few states where disbarment is automatically permanent, the others being Indiana, Ohio, and New Jersey.

== Bar programs ==
=== Client Security Fund ===
==== Purpose and procedure ====
Like most other states, the Oregon State Bar Association has established a "Client Security Fund" which will reimburse clients, up to a certain amount, who are victims of their own lawyer's dishonesty. To be eligible for a CSF award, there must evidence of dishonesty in an established lawyer-client relationship or the lawyer must have acting in a fiduciary capacity related to the lawyer's practice of law. "Dishonesty" includes failing to refund fees where no work was done on the matter or where the work done was de minimis or of no value to the client.

==== Decision to create fund ====
In late September 1958, the bar association voted at its annual convention to adopt an indemnity plan to protect clients against losses of funds entrusted to a member of the profession. This was reported to have set "nation-wide legal history.". According to an editorial published in November 1963 in favor of the "client indemnification plan", the concept was relatively new, but had been catching on rapidly. The 1963 editorial stated that "the inauguration of the client indemnity fund would not be an admission, tacit or otherwise, that there are crooks active in the practice of law In the state. Nor would it be an accusation against other members of the bar. It would affirm their responsibility to the public. It would be an assurance that lawyers as a whole are so proud of their profession, so confident of their fellows, that they are willing to tax themselves to protect their clients against the occasional misdeeds of a few."

==== First effort fails in 1959 ====
In March 1959, a bill was introduced in the Oregon Legislature which would have set up a fund to reimburse the public when attorneys embezzled funds of their clients. The bill was recommended by the Oregon State Bar. The system would be funded by assessments on the members of the bar. On March 24, 1959, the bill was voted down in the Judiciary Committee of the Oregon House of Representatives. According to a report, "the committee felt it would be unfair to require honest attorneys to pay for the sins of dishonest lawyers and that the bill would have encouraged claims against the proposed fund.". According to an editorial from the time that was critical of the 1959 legislature, "the lawyers indemnity fund, a self-financed tax upon the lawyers of the state to pay losses from the occasional embezzling attorney, was killed by a committee of house lawyers."

==== Renewed initiatives ====
The controversial indemnity fund issue was taken up again at the bar convention in late September 1959. Bar president George L. Hibbard turned in a report to the bar that recommended adoption of the program. Although the indemnity fund proposal had previously been tabled by the House Judiciary Committee, President Hibbard recommended that the bar campaign to get the measure passed at the next legislative session. According to a press report of at the time, "those who don't like the idea have been pretty noisy in their condemnation of the plan.'Why should we honest lawyers have to dig down to protect clients against the unscruplous few who should be drummed out of the club?' is the substance of their argument.". The same report stated that "those who favor the plan say that such a fund would at stature to the high principles of the profession."

On Friday, November 15, 1963, the Oregon State Bar Association conducted a secret ballot mail poll of Oregon lawyers regarding the association's proposal to establish a "client security fund." The purpose of the fund would be to reimburse clients suffering loss through defalcation, embezzlement, conversion, or misappropriation of funds by their lawyers. About 2,533 ballots were mailed out on November 1, 1963 and 1,846 valid ballots were returned. Of those who returned ballots, 658 lawyers supported establishment of the fund, 109 declined to vote, stating they lacked sufficient information to decide, and 1,079 were opposed.

==== Successful establishment ====
In 1966, at the bar association's annual convention, following considerable debate, the bar adopted by a vote of 142 to 124, a plan to propose that the legislature authorize the bar to create a client security fund. The 1967 Oregon Legislature enacted enabling legislation. This was later codified as the Client Security Fund Act.

The Client Security Fund Act authorized the bar to adopt a plan by which clients who suffered financial losses because of dishonest conduct of bar members could be reimbursed. The funds would be raised primarily by a standard compulsory payment by all members of the bar. The act of the 1967 session (Oregon Laws 1967 Ch. 546) became effective on September 16, 1967.

Soon afterwards at the 1967 annual meeting, the bar approved a resolution establishing the fund. The bar's board of governors at their November 10–11, 1967, meeting adopted a motion providing for an annual membership assessment of $5 to support the fund. At its April 19–20, 1968 meeting the board passed a detailed resolution which set up a complete procedure for administering the program, which came to be called the "Client Security Fund" ("CSF").

In 1970, CSF was upheld by the Oregon Supreme Court against a challenge that it was unconstitutional on the grounds of equal protection and due process of law.

==== Claims history ====
For the first twenty-six years of the Client Security Fund's existence, the maximum claim payable was $25,000 (equivalent to $225,538 in September 2022). The maximum payment per claim was raised to $50,000 in 1993. In 2012 and in 2019, the Client Security Fund was exhausted by the malfeasance of two attorneys who embezzled large amounts of client moneys from their own trust accounts. One of these lawyers stole over $3.4 million from clients, which was the worst fraud by a lawyer in Oregon history. The money came from insurance settlements that were supposed to have been paid to the lawyer's clients. As of June 2022, the Client Security Fund had approved $1.3 million in payouts to lawyer's defrauded clients.

In response to the 2019 embezzlements, the bar association raised the maximum CSF payment per claim from $50,000 to $100,000, and also backed new legislation, enacted as SB 180, which, as an anti-embezzlement measure, would require insurers to notify clients directly when the insurer paid a settlement to a client's lawyer.

=== Professional Liability Fund ===
In 1977, the Oregon Legislature enacted legislation which gave the OSB Board of Governors authority to establish a professional liability fund for the purpose of insuring lawyers against malpractice lawsuits. The fund would be financed by an annual assessment on lawyers in private practice in Oregon.

Exercising its delegated authority, the Board passed a resolution, effective July 1, 1978, requiring all Oregon based attorneys to carry malpractice coverage with aggregate limits of not less than $100,000. The resolution further provided that the required malpractice coverage "for all active members in the private practice of law, with the exception of patent attorneys, shall be obtained through" the Fund.

In 1989, PLF survived a legal challenge on anti-trust grounds.

As of 2019, Oregon and Idaho are the only two states where lawyers are required to carry professional liability insurance. PLF's practice management attorneys and attorney counselors provide confidential services to all Oregon lawyers.

=== Interest on Lawyer Trust Accounts ===
The Oregon State Bar's IOLTA Program (Interest on Lawyer Trust Accounts) began on a voluntary basis in 1983. In 1988, the bar members voted to make the IOLTA program mandatory, and the Oregon Supreme Court approved the necessary rule changes, effective May 1, 1989. Interest on short term client deposits in lawyer trust accounts is paid by the financial institution to the Oregon Law Foundation, which uses the revenue "to fund organizations in Oregon that provide legal services to people of lesser means, promote diversity in the legal profession, and educate the public about the law."

=== Licensed paralegals ===
On July 19, 2022 the Oregon Supreme Court approved a proposal to license paralegals to provide some legal services that currently only lawyers may provide. Under the new rules, licensed paralegals will be allowed to provide limited legal services only in family law cases (divorces, custody, parenting time, etc.), and landlord/tenant cases.

=== Modest Means and legal aid ===
In October 1912, Associated Charities organized a legal aid committee to provide confidential volunteer legal advice to people in financial distress. Well-known Portland lawyer C. Henri Labbe was the vice-president. In 1945, the Oregon State Bar had a legal aid committee to provide legal services to veterans who could not afford them.

Oregon lawyers created the Modest Means Program to help moderate income Oregonians find affordable legal help. Eligibility for the program is based on the type of the legal matter, the applicant's income and assets, and the availability of participating attorneys. If OSB decides that a person is qualified for the program, then the participating lawyer will charge the person a reduced rate for legal work. The Modest Means Program only available at trial level courts involving four types of legal matters: family law, criminal defense, landlord-tenant, and foreclosure. Even at the reduced rates, many persons cannot afford legal services through the program.

== Public Records Law ==
In March 1936, the board of governors of the newly-incorporated bar association declined to release the names of three attorneys who had received bar reprimands for unethical conduct, as well as the names of two other attorneys who had been exonerated. Records, or at least some of them, did become public when the bar association sought an actual suspension of an attorney from practice by a filing in the Oregon Supreme Court.

In 1973, the Oregon Legislature passed the Oregon Public Records Law.

In June 1974, Russell Sadler, a reporter for the Salem Capital Journal sought disciplinary records related to lawyer and politician Jason Lee, who was standing as a candidate for a judgeship on the Oregon Court of Appeals. Oregon Attorney General Lee Johnson had recently ordered the bar association to produce records for another lawyer, also at the request of the Capital Journal, and the association had similarly refused. (The newspaper dropped that request when it learned the information from another source.)

James Welch, managing editor of the Capital Journal, stated that the newspaper's interest was based on the fact that Lee had narrowly defeated incumbent judge Jacob Tanzer in the primary election held on May 28, 1974, despite Tanzer's having had overwhelming support from members of the Oregon State Bar.

Lee had been reprimanded by the Oregon Supreme Court in 1965, and this was already on the public record. The newspaper wanted to see his disciplinary file to ascertain if there were other complaints on file regarding Lee.

Sadler brought legal action under the Oregon Public Records law to enforce his request, and in 1975, the Oregon Supreme Court ruled in his favor and required disclosure of the records. Oregon became the first state in the nation to provide complete access to all records, including grievances from clients.

== Challenge to the unified bar ==
Controversial articles and graphic design published in the Oregon State Bar Bulletin in April 2018

=== Supreme Court restriction on "non-germane" activities ===
OSB is an "integrated" or "unified" bar, meaning that all lawyers in the state are required to belong to the association. As of 2020, thirty-one states and the District of Columbia have unified bars.

In 1990, in the case of Keller v. State Bar of California, the Supreme Court held that a state could require lawyers to belong to an integrated bar association, but prohibited integrated bars from funding with mandatory dues "activities having political or ideological coloration which are not reasonably related to the advancement of [its regulatory] goals."

Lawyers have sued a number of unified bars alleging that under the 2018 Supreme Court decision in Janus v. AFSCME, it is unconstitutional to require an attorney join a bar association to practice law.

=== OSB publication of political material ===
OSB publishes a monthly magazine called the Oregon State Bar Bulletin which is printed using funds from membership dues and which is sent to all members of the Oregon State Bar.

In April 2018 two statements allegedly of a political nature were published in the bar bulletin. One, entitled "Statement on White Nationalism and Normalization of Violence", was signed by six officers of the Bar. The second was a joint supporting statement of seven Oregon affinity bar associations which specifically and repeated criticized President Donald Trump by name for having "catered to this white nationalist movement, allowing it to make up the base of his support and providing it a false sense of legitimacy."

The statements were published on facing pages. A green margin band enclosed both statements within a single print area, making the two statements appear to be joined. According to one report, it was the second statement that "really set off" conservative critics.

At the meeting of the Oregon State Bar's Board of Governors on April 20, 2018, the Bar's chief executive officer noted that the Board of Governors "did not formally adopt the statement by the specialty bar groups" but that "publishing the two statements together was 'ill-advised and confusing.'”

=== Legal action against OSB ===
In 2018, two lawsuits were brought against the Oregon State Bar, specifically Gruber v. OSB and Crowe v. OSB. In Crowe, the plaintiffs alleged that the statements in the Bar Bulletin were non-germane political advocacy, and for that reason, the requirement for mandatory membership in the bar association violated their rights to freedom of association under the First and Fourteenth Amendments to the constitution of the United States.

A lawyer for the plaintiffs stated that the lawsuit "says lawyers should still be licensed, but 'that's different from membership with the bar, which implies somebody speaks for you.'”

In 2019, both cases were dismissed by the U.S. District Court. Appeals were taken to the Ninth Circuit Court of Appeals, which gave its decision in 2021. The Ninth Circuit "affirm[ed] the district court as to Plaintiffs’ free speech claim and the adequacy of OSB’s procedural safeguards with respect to protecting Plaintiffs’ free speech rights," but found that "[p]laintiffs' freedom of association claim based on the April 2018 Bulletin statements is viable," and remanded the case to the trial court with instructions to consider the claim in the light of the Supreme Court's Janus decision. In February of 2023, the U.S. District Court for the District of Oregon again rejected plaintiffs' free association claims.

Both cases were again appealed to the United States Court of Appeals for the Ninth Circuit, which issued decisions on August 28, 2024. The Court of Appeals dismissed Crowe's case against the Oregon State Bar on the grounds that the Oregon State Bar is an "arm of the state" that is immune from being sued, however the court also found that OSB officers (who Crowe also sued) are not immune from suit. Regarding the claims against these officers, the court found

OSB engaged in nongermane conduct by adopting the Specialty Bars’ statement. . . . At least some of the Specialty Bars’ statement was not germane. The statement opened by describing the Specialty Bars’ “commitment to the vision of a justice system that operates without discrimination,” but much of its criticism of then-President Trump did not relate to the justice system at all . . . .

The court then found that "[t]he remedy for this violation need not be drastic," and that "if OSB does engage in nongermane activities, in situations in which those activities might be attributed to its members it could include a disclaimer that makes clear that it does not speak on behalf of all those members."

The Court of Appeals dismissed the claims against OSB in the Gruber case on the same immunity grounds as in the Crowe case, and dismissed the remainder of Gruber's claims (against OSB officers) in light of her resignation from OSB. Finally, the court upheld the district court's grant of summary judgment in favor of OSB officers with regard to Gruber's co-plaintiff's claims.

== See also ==
- List of Oregon judges
- List of first women lawyers and judges in Oregon
- List of first minority male lawyers and judges in Oregon
- List of Oregon affinity bar associations
- Multnomah Bar Association
